= List of endemic birds of the Galápagos Islands =

Map of the Galápagos Islands, showing the archipelago's topography

== Endemism and threats ==
The islands are home to several endemic genera.

== Endemic Bird Area ==
Birdlife International defines Endemic Bird Areas (EBAs) as places where the breeding ranges of two or more range-restricted species—those with breeding ranges of less than 50,000 km^{2} (19,000 sq mi)—overlap. In order to qualify, the whole of the breeding range of at least two range-restricted species must fall entirely within the EBA. The entire Galápagos Islands archipelago is considered to be an Endemic Bird Area. Ten Important Bird Areas, which are areas which meet a specific set of internationally agreed criteria, fall within the EBA's boundaries.

== List of endemic species ==
IUCN Red List categories
Conservation status
- EX: Extinct (1 species)
- EW: Extinct in the wild (0 species)
- CR: Critically endangered (2 species)
- EN: Endangered (3 species)
- VU: Vulnerable (12 species)
- NT: Near threatened (3 species)
- LC: Least concern (11 species)

Taxon. order (Note: This list uses the taxonomy proposed by the International Ornithologists' Union. Avian checklists and field guides typically list species in taxonomic order to show the evolutionary relationships between species; those which are more closely related are physically listed nearer each other.)	Common name	Picture	Scientific name	Distribution and habitat	IUCN status (Note: This column sorts by threat level, as outlined in the key above.)	Notes
1	Galápagos dove		Zenaida galapagoensis		NT^{IUCN}	
2	Galápagos crake		Laterallus spilonota	Highlands of the main islands (except Floreana)	VU^{IUCN}	Also known as Galápagos rail
3	Lava gull		Leucophaeus fuliginosus		VU^{IUCN}	
4	Galápagos penguin		Spheniscus mendiculus		EN^{IUCN}	
5	Flightless cormorant	Photo of a long-beaked black bird standing on a rocky shore and holding its stumpy wings outstretched	Nannopterum harrisi	Coastal areas on Fernandina and northern and western Isabela	VU^{IUCN}	
6	Lava heron	Photo of a gray and green bird with a black cap and long orange legs standing on rocks near a sandy beach	Butorides sundevalli	Rocky shores and marine lagoons on islands throughout	LC^{IUCN}	Considered by some authorities (including BirdLife International and the American Ornithological Society) to be a subspecies of the striated heron
7	Galápagos hawk	Photo of a large, dark brown bird with a strongly hooked beak and yellow legs and feet, perched on a dead snag	Buteo galapagoensis	All habitats throughout the islands, except on Genovesa, San Cristóbal, and Floreana	VU^{IUCN}	
8	Galápagos martin		Progne modesta		EN^{IUCN}	
9	Large-billed flycatcher		Myiarchus magnirostris		LC^{IUCN}	
10	Darwin's flycatcher		Pyrocephalus nanus		NT^{IUCN}	
11	San Cristóbal flycatcher		Pyrocephalus dubius		EX^{IUCN}	Extinct
12	Galapagos mockingbird		Mimus parvulus		LC^{IUCN}	
13	Floreana mockingbird		Mimus trifasciatus		EN^{IUCN}	Also known as Charles Island mockingbird
14	Hood mockingbird		Mimus macdonaldi		VU^{IUCN}	Also known as Española mockingbird
15	San Cristóbal mockingbird		Mimus melanotis		NT^{IUCN}	Also known as Chatham mockingbird
16	Large ground finch		Geospiza magnirostris		LC^{IUCN}	
17	Medium ground finch		Geospiza fortis		LC^{IUCN}	
18	Small ground finch		Geospiza fuliginosa		LC^{IUCN}	
19	Genovesa ground finch		Geospiza acutirostris		VU^{IUCN}	
20	Sharp-beaked ground finch		Geospiza difficilis		LC^{IUCN}	
21	Vampire ground finch		Geospiza septentrionalis		VU^{IUCN}	
22	Common cactus finch		Geospiza scandens		LC^{IUCN}	
23	Española cactus finch		Geospiza conirostris		VU^{IUCN}	
24	Genovesa cactus finch		Geospiza propinqua		VU^{IUCN}	
25	Vegetarian finch		Platyspiza crassirostris		LC^{IUCN}	
26	Large tree finch		Camarhynchus psittacula		VU^{IUCN}	
27	Medium tree finch		Camarhynchus pauper		CR^{IUCN}	
28	Small tree finch		Camarhynchus parvulus		LC^{IUCN}	
29	Woodpecker finch		Camarhynchus pallidus		VU^{IUCN}	
30	Mangrove finch		Camarhynchus heliobates		CR^{IUCN}	
31	Green warbler-finch		Certhidea olivacea		VU^{IUCN}	Sometimes considered conspecific with the grey warbler-finch
32	Grey warbler-finch		Certhidea fusca		LC^{IUCN}	

== Citations ==
=== References ===
- BirdLife International (2004). "Most Endemic Bird Areas are in the tropics and important for other biodiversity too". birdlife.org.
- BirdLife International (2017). "Green Warbler-finch: Certhidea olivacea". IUCN Red List of Threatened Species. 2017.
- BirdLife International (2021a). "Galápagos Islands". birdlife.org.
- BirdLife International (2021b). "Species factsheet: Galapagos Rail – Laterallus spilonota".
- Cornell Lab of Ornithology (16 November 2015). "What is taxonomic order and why is it used for the sequence of birds in my field guide?". All About Birds.
- Lepage, Denis (ed.). "Galapagos Heron: Butorides sundevalli". Avibase — The World Bird Database.
- Fitter, Julian; Fitter, Daniel & Hosking, David (2000). Wildlife of the Galápagos. Princeton, NJ: Princeton Pocket Guides. ISBN 978-0-691-10295-5.
- Gill, Frank; Donsker, David & Rasmussen, Pamela, eds. (2021). "IOC World Bird List". IOC.
- Santander, Tatiana; Freile, Juan F. & Loor-Vela, Sandra (2009). "Ecuador". In Devenish, C.; Díaz-Fernández, D. F.; Clay, R. P.; Davidson, I. & Yépez Zabala, I. (eds.). Important Bird Areas Americas - Priority sites for biodiversity conservation. Quito: BirdLife International. ISBN 978-9942-9959-0-2.
