= Daphne Major finches =

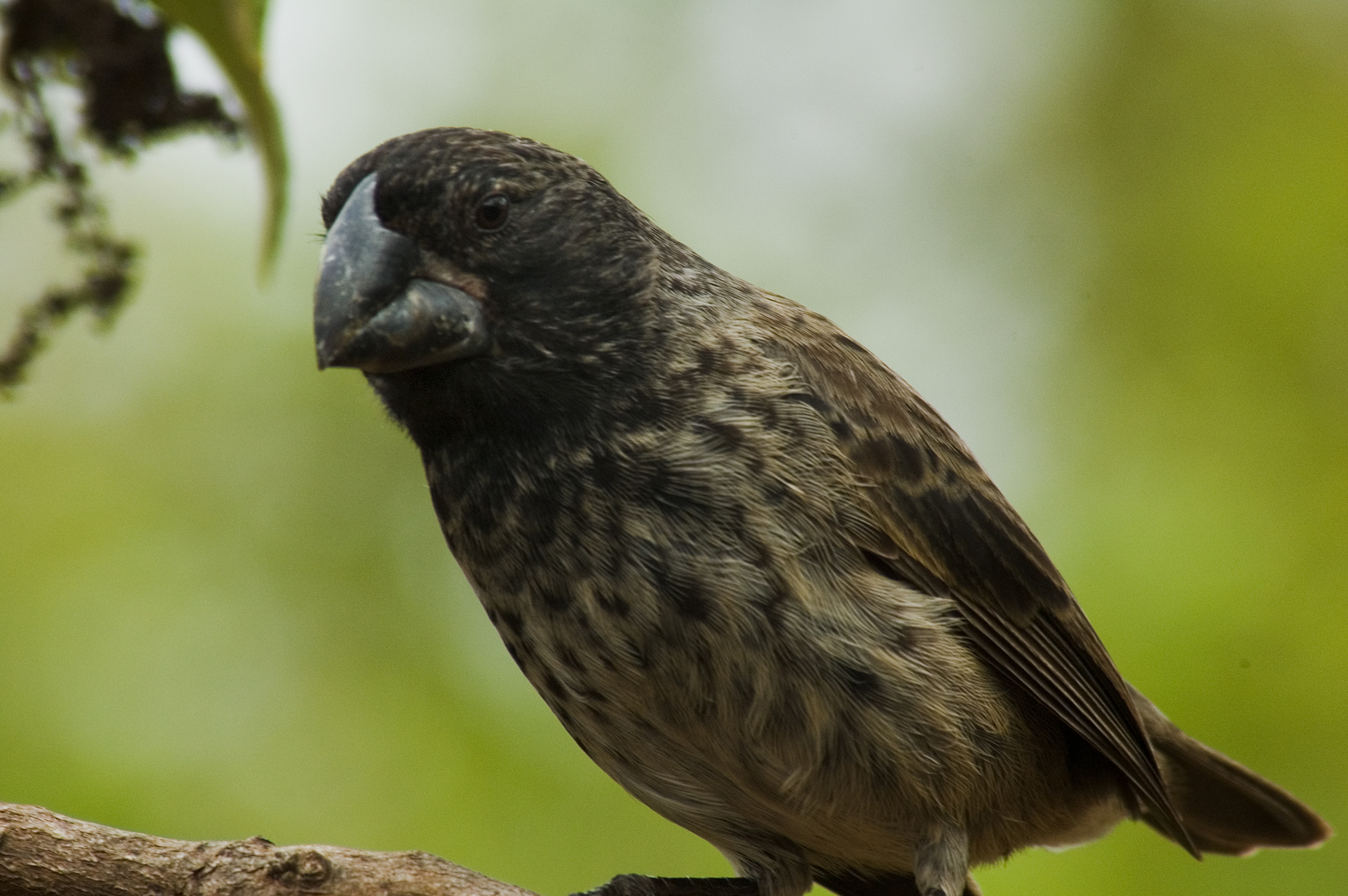
Large ground finch (Geospiza magnirostris)

The Daphne Major finches are a group of Darwin's finches that inhabit Daphne Major island of the Galápagos. The common cactus finch (Geospiza scandens) and the medium ground finch (G. fortis) are the main species; while the large ground finch (G. magnirostris) and the Española cactus finch (G. conirostris) are regular immigrants. Most extensively studied by Peter and Rosemary Grant of Princeton University since 1973, the birds are one of the sources of the understanding of bird behaviour, adaptation, and evolution.

Since the early 1980s, it has been observed that a population of finches on Daphne Major, named the Big Bird lineage, has started to develop into what will likely become a distinct species. These birds are currently still considered as hybrids of the Española cactus finch (G. conirostris) and the medium ground finch, but the breeding of the offspring exclusively among themselves gave rise to a new lineage which are reproductively isolated from the parent populations. This is a case of demonstrating homoploid hybrid speciation, and an example of human observed speciation.
