= Cactus finch =

Cactus finch may refer to the following birds:

- Common cactus finch, Geospiza scandens, small cactus finch.
- Española cactus finch, Geospiza conirostris.
- Genovesa cactus finch, Geospiza propinqua.
