= Big Bird (finch) =

Scientific classification
- Kingdom: Animalia
- Phylum: Chordata
- Class: Aves
- Order: Passeriformes
- Family: Thraupidae
- Genus: Geospiza
- Species: G. conirostris × G. fortis

Species of Darwin's finches

Big Bird, also known as the Big Bird lineage, is one of the species of Darwin's finches that is exclusively present on Daphne Major of the Galápagos Islands. It originated from a single male Española cactus finch (Geospiza conirostris) that immigrated to Daphne Major in 1981, which founded a hybrid lineage by breeding with a female medium ground finch (Geospiza fortis) and creating five offspring. It resembles the medium ground finch but is relatively larger, hence the name. The offspring tend to breed only with their own family members, thereby giving rise to reproductive isolation and undergoing speciation. Discovered by the research team of Peter and Rosemary Grant, the formation of Big Birds as a distinct species is considered as an instance of observed speciation and as a process of evolution by natural selection.

The original Big Bird bred with a female medium ground finch to create five bigger offspring (F_{1}). A drought from 2003 to 2005 wiped out all of the population except for a F_{3} brother-sister pair, which went on to mate with each other when the rain returned. All surviving Big Birds are the offspring of these two finches, coded 19228 and 19798 in the 2017 Science article. Their father was descended from a F_{1} hybrid male and a resident female medium ground finch. Their mother was descended from two F_{1} hybrids. As a result, all current Big Birds (the last generation as of 2017 being 3 F_{6} birds) have 3/8 pedigree from the immigrant Geospiza conirostris.
