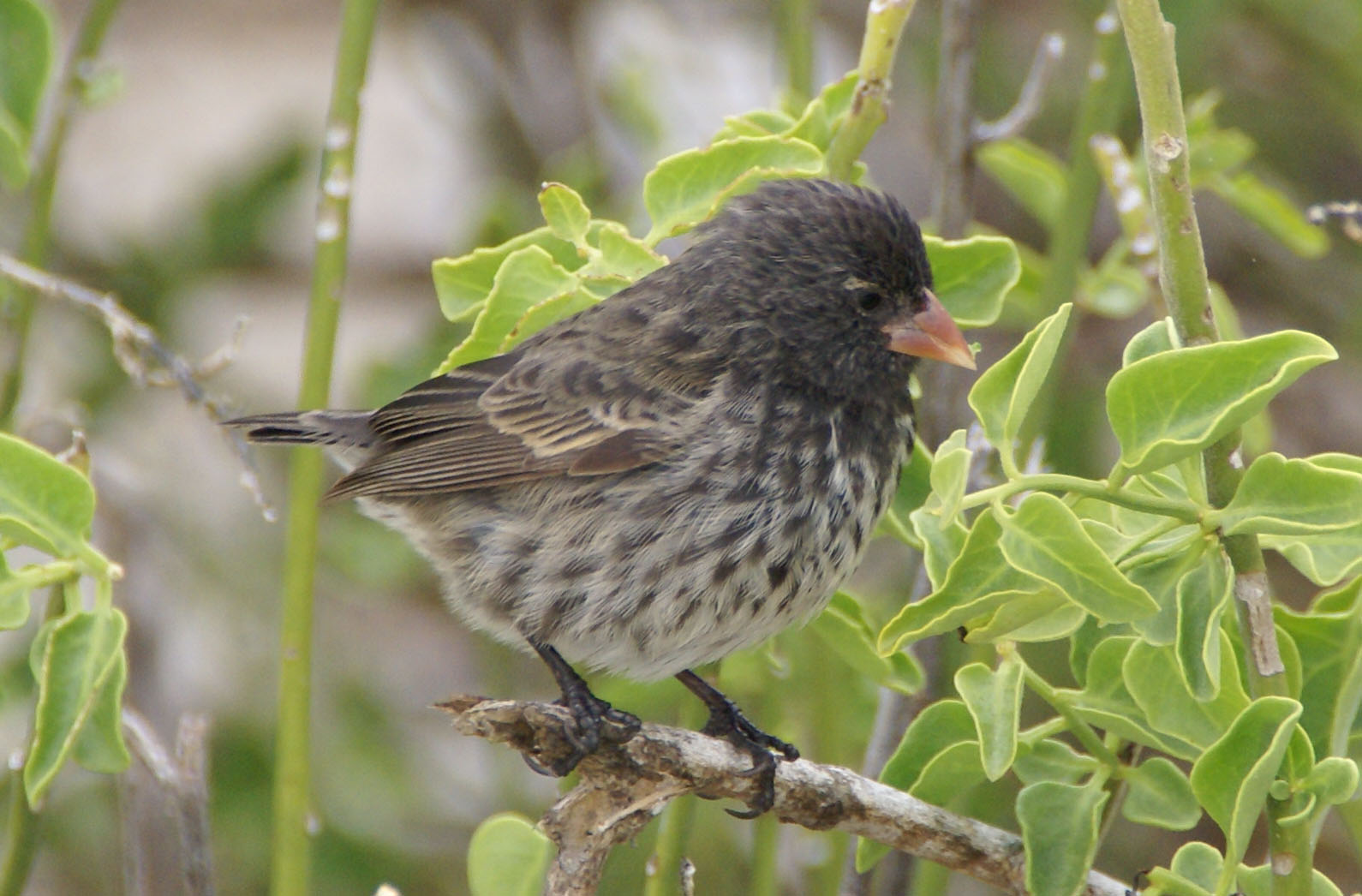
- Small ground finch (Geospiza fuliginosa)

Scientific classification
- Kingdom: Animalia
- Phylum: Chordata
- Class: Aves
- Order: Passeriformes
- Family: Thraupidae
- Genus: Geospiza; Gould, 1837

Type species
- Geospiza magnirostris Gould, 1837

= Geospiza =

Genus of birds

Geospiza is a genus of bird in the tanager family Thraupidae. All species in the genus are endemic to the Galápagos Islands. Together with related genera, they are collectively known as Darwin's finches. Although in the past, they were classified in the bunting and American sparrow family Emberizidae, more recent studies have shown they belong in the tanager family.

== Taxonomy and species list ==
The genus Geospiza was introduced in 1837 by the English ornithologist John Gould with the large ground finch as the type species. The genus name derives from the two Ancient Greek words γῆ (gê), meaning "earth", and σπίζα (spíza), a catch-all term for finch-like birds. The member of the genus form part of a group collectively known as Darwin's finches. Although traditionally placed with the buntings and New World sparrows in the family Emberizidae, molecular phylogenetic studies have shown that Darwin's finches are members of the subfamily Coerebinae within the tanager family Thraupidae.

The genus contains the following nine species.

Image	Scientific name	Common name	Distribution
	Geospiza fuliginosa	Small ground finch	Galápagos Islands
	Geospiza difficilis	Sharp-beaked ground finch	western/central Galápagos Islands
	Geospiza acutirostris	Genovesa ground finch	Genovesa Island
	Geospiza septentrionalis	Vampire ground finch	Darwin and Wolf Island
	Geospiza conirostris	Española cactus finch	Española Island
	Geospiza propinqua	Genovesa cactus finch	Genovesa Island
	Geospiza magnirostris	Large ground finch	Galápagos Islands
	Geospiza scandens	Common cactus finch	Galápagos Islands
	Geospiza fortis	Medium ground finch	Galápagos Islands

=== Hybrids ===
A purported hybrid species (informally nicknamed "Big Bird") endemic to Daphne Major and formed almost four decades prior by hybridization between a vagrant Geospiza conirostris and a Geospiza fortis was also reported in 2017, though it has yet to be formally described.
