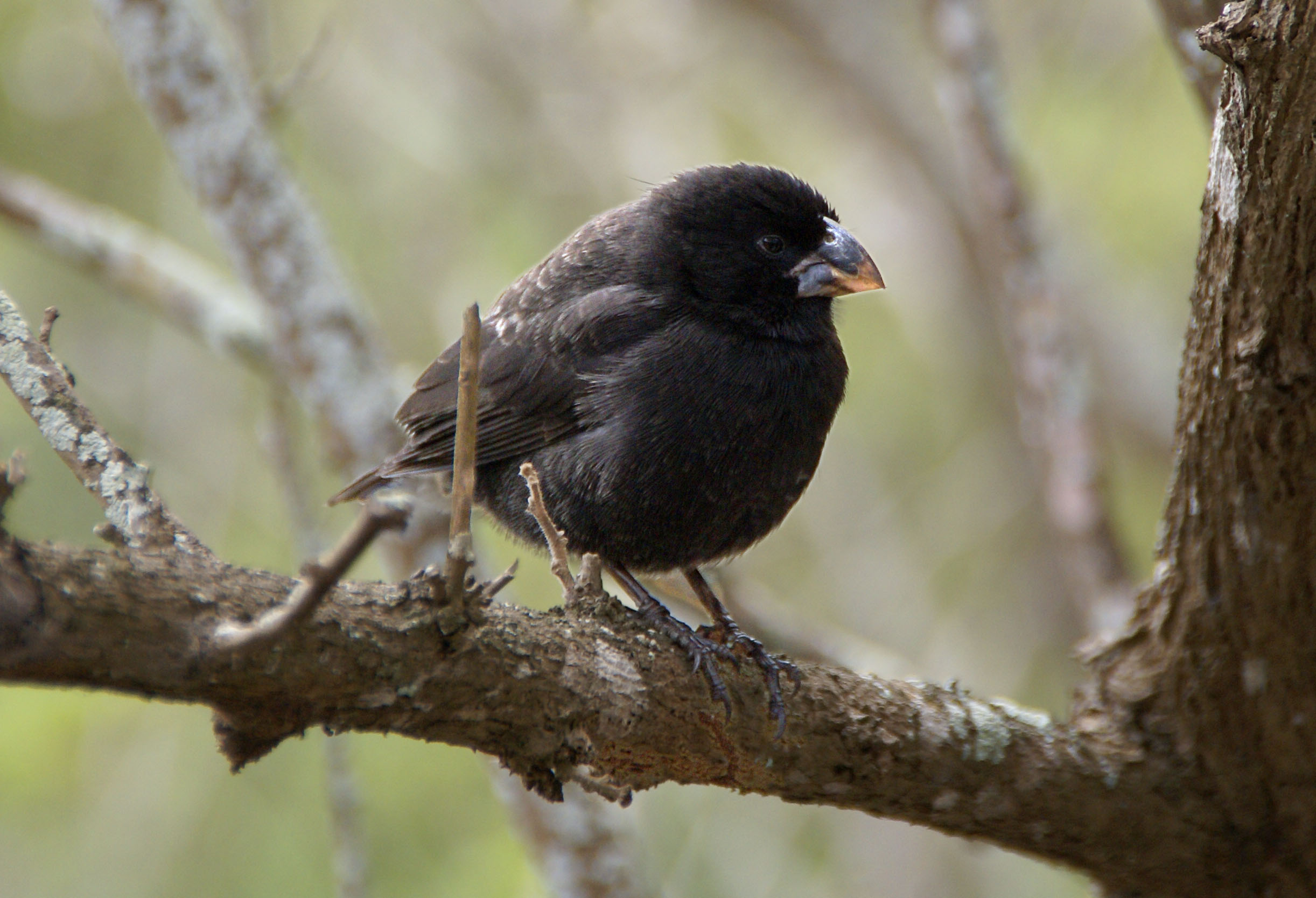
- Male
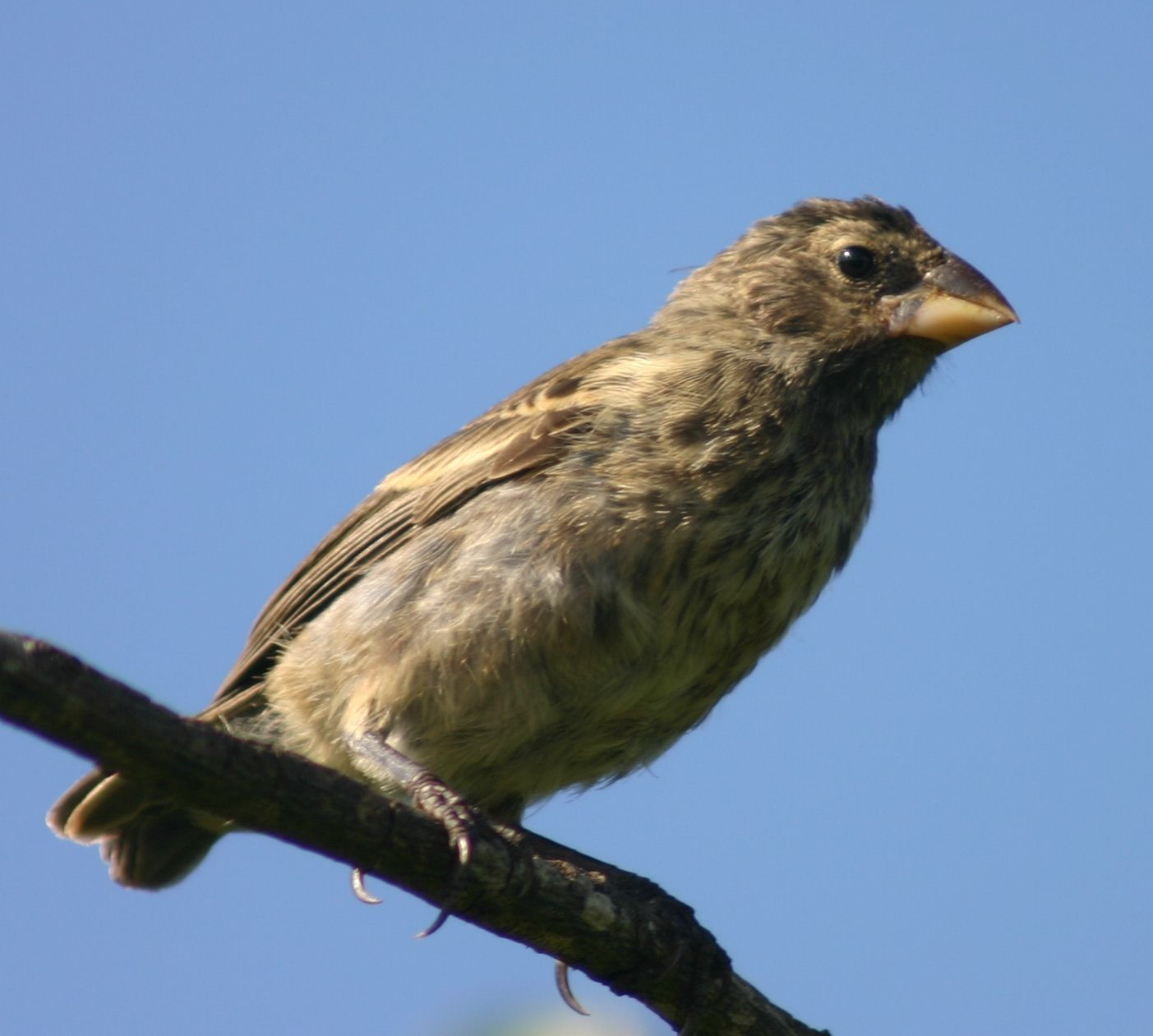
- Female

Conservation status
- Least Concern (IUCN 3.1)

Scientific classification
- Kingdom: Animalia
- Phylum: Chordata
- Class: Aves
- Order: Passeriformes
- Family: Thraupidae
- Genus: Geospiza
- Species: G. fortis

Binomial name
- Geospiza fortis Gould, 1837

= Medium ground finch =

Species of bird

The medium ground finch (Geospiza fortis) is a species of bird in the family Thraupidae. It is endemic to the Galápagos Islands. Its primary natural habitat is tropical shrubland. One of Darwin's finches, the species was the first which scientists have observed evolving in real-time.

Many studies and research have been conducted on medium ground finches: there are the most famous studies conducted by Charles Darwin and more recent studies conducted in relation to the changes revolving around the medium ground finches due to natural selection. Due to an increase in urbanization on the Galápagos Islands, droughts and climate change, character displacement, changes in the finch's habitat and range, inbreeding and nesting, parasites, and viruses, medium ground finches have gone through changes. Changes that have been observed are beak size, behavior in feeding, behavior in inbreeding, behaviors in nesting, antibody development and more. The changes in the Galápagos Islands are factors that affect the medium ground finches.

== Description ==
Like the other members of its genus, the medium ground finch is strongly sexually dimorphic; the female's plumage is brown and streaky, while the male's is solid black, with white tips to the undertail coverts. The bird measures 12.5 cm (4.9 in) in length—which falls between the lengths of the small and large ground finches. (Note: By convention, length is measured from the tip of the bill to the tip of the tail on a dead bird (or skin) laid on its back.) The bill of this species is quite variable in size, though the length of the upper mandible is always greater than the depth of the bill at its base. The wing shape, on average, seems to change with ecological shifts. Different selective pressures act on the wing shape of the finches, such as natural and sexual selection. The males have shorter, rounder wings, which help with maneuvering around a female during sexual displays.

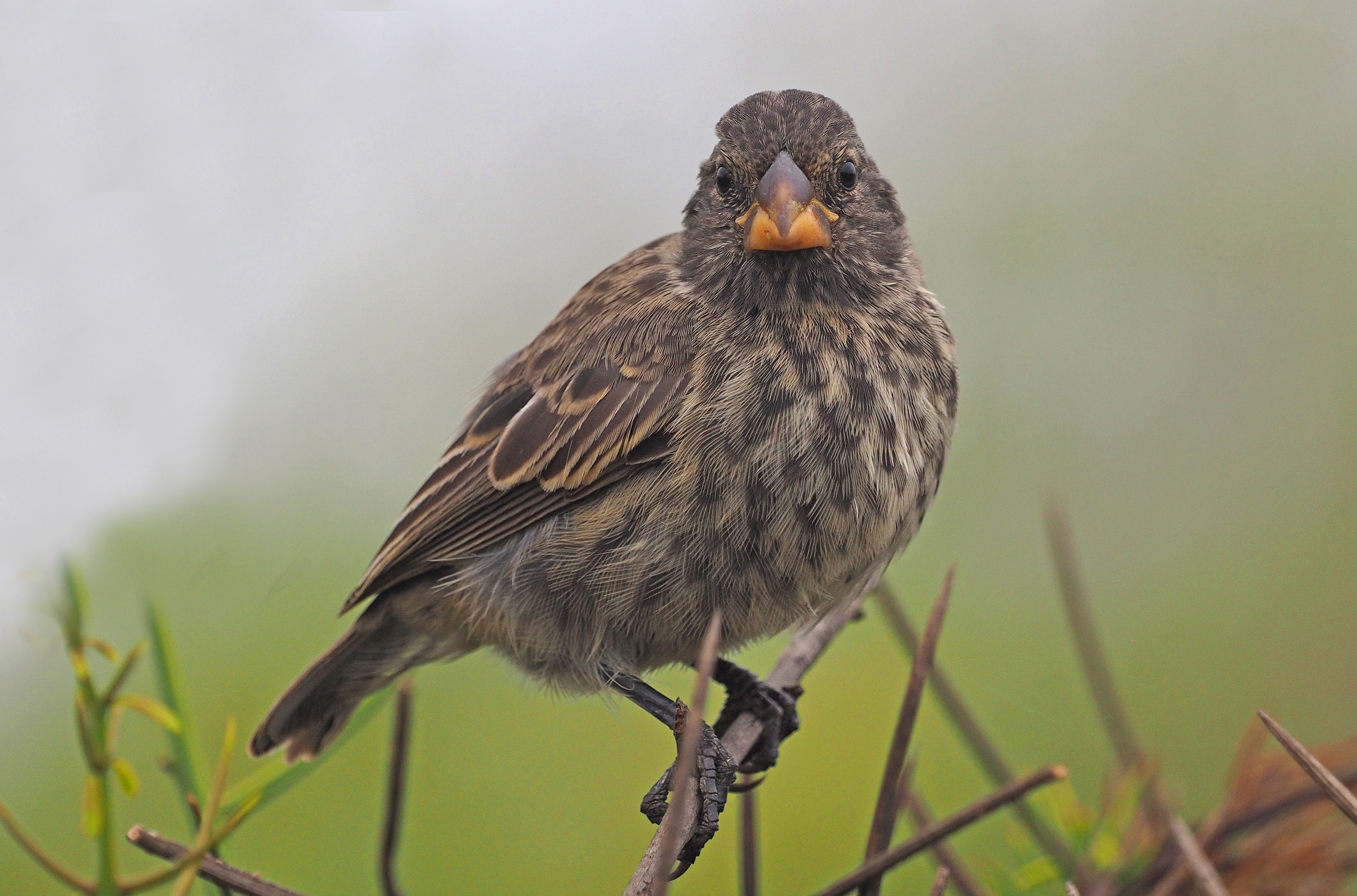
A medium ground finch

== Evolution ==
The Galápagos Islands are famous for plant and animal life; they are also famous due to the studies conducted by Charles Darwin, which led to the development of his theory of evolution by natural selection. The Galápagos Islands have now changed and has been an area of rapid urbanization. These changes have caused an impact to the life on the island. Since the 1990s, Galápagos tourism has increased by 9.4% per year and resident populations have increased by about 6.4% per year. Rural areas on the islands, which were privately owned, had wetlands suitable for agriculture. This agriculture brought about invasive plant species, which included guava, passion fruit, etc. The urban areas had more human activity like roads, shops, and pollution. This area brought invasive species to the island like fire ants, black rats, etc. With these changes in the environment, medium ground finches with short/stubby beaks adapted due to the seeds and food preferences.

Food is the main driver of beak size and shape in Darwin's finches. For medium ground finches to be able to survive in urban areas, they had to adapt to new environments. Studies have shown that medium ground finches' phenotypes have been more variable than of small ground finches on Santa Cruz Island, being consistent with previous findings that medium ground finches adapt more rapidly to local conditions than small ground finches. The speed of how medium ground finches have been able to change beaks' sizes and shape may be centered around epigenetics. A research team led by Ms. McNew on the Galápagos Islands has measured the physical traits of wild birds and the genetics and epigenetics of two Darwin's finch species living at El Garrapatero, a rural area. They then compared the findings to urban finches living near Puerto Ayora; the two sites were not far apart. Some of the earlier studies showed that only one female out of 300 medium ground finches that were marked and used in the research relocated between both sites. Later on, Ms. McNew then captured more than 1,000 small ground finch and medium ground finch specimens, taking blood samples from females, sperm from males, and physical characteristics from each finch. Researchers realized that there was a difference between urban and rural finches' feeding preferences. The finches living in urban areas preferred human foods while the rural living finches did not. They then discovered that medium ground finches from the urban living area were larger in beak size than those living in the rural area. As for the small ground finches living in urban areas, they did not have any morphological differences from the ones living in rural areas. After conducting research, Ms. McNew and her team looked for evidence through genetics and found no evidence that can prove these phenotypic changes occurred through mutations. But when looking at epigenetics, there was significant evidence. In the finches studied, epigenetic alterations between the populations were dramatic, but minimal genetic changes were observed. The evidence showed that in medium and small ground finches, most of the epigenetic mutations were related to beak size and shape.

Urbanization is not the only factor affecting medium ground finches; drought and character displacement can also act as a selective pressure that can drive evolution of medium ground finches. In 1977, a severe drought reduced the supply of seeds in the Galápagos. The finch on Daphne Major, which normally preferred small and soft seeds, was forced to turn to harder, larger seeds. This strong selective pressure favoring larger beaks, coupled with the high heritability of traits relating to beak size in finches, caused the medium ground finch population to experience evolution by natural selection, leading to an increase in average beak size in the subsequent generation. A second drought of 1984–1986 caused a similar change, made more apparent by having smaller birds with bigger beaks.

Evidence of evolution through character displacement has been found in a population of medium ground finches on the Galápagos island of Daphne Major. During a drought in 2004, overlap in the diets of the medium ground finch population and a recently settled population of large ground finches (Geospiza magnirostris, five founding birds in 1982) led to competition for a limited supply of seeds on which the medium ground finch population normally fed. Because the large ground finches were able to out-compete the medium ground finches for these seeds due to both a larger beak and body size, the medium ground finch population experienced a strong selective pressure against large beaks to avoid competition, ultimately leading to dramatic evolutionary change favoring smaller beaks in the subsequent generation.

=== Speciation ===
The Big Bird lineage occurred through hybrid speciation between Daphne Major G. fortis and an immigrant G. conirostris. The group underwent a severe bottleneck (down to two members) during the 2004 drought.

The study on "Big Bird" also has a whole-genome phylogeny of some Darwin's finches. Geospiza fortis is not monophyletic in the analyses: the minimum clade that would include all G. fortis also includes G. acutirostris, G. fuliginosa, G. magnirostris, and G. conirostris. The issue has been discussed in a broader context in Zink et al. (2019). See also Darwin's finches § Phylogeny.

== Habitat and range ==
Endemic to the Galápagos, the medium ground finch is found on ten islands: Baltra, Floreana, Isabela, Fernandina, Seymour, Pinzón, San Cristóbal, Santa Cruz, Santa Fé, and Santiago. They are found on most of the main islands including the surrounding islets. They are found in semi-arid biomes. Medium ground finches make dome shaped nests, mainly in Opuntia cacti. These nests are made by the males.

Medium ground finches have a better chance of survival in their habitat than small ground finches, due to their beak size. The beak size of medium ground finches can evolve in a relatively short period of time, depending on if it is a wet season or dry season. Survival and beak size of the birds are fueled by the environment. Weather conditions will favor one beak size over the other, causing birds of the unfavorable bill size to die off. The HMGA2 gene locus is responsible for the evolution of beak size and plays an important role in natural selection.

The range size of a medium ground finch varies. It relies on many factors, such as the part of year it is, age, and the sex of the bird. Females that are incubating are more likely to remain in her nesting territory. Finches are 3.7 times more likely to travel to the brooding area than any other location.

Urbanization in the Galápagos is slowly increasing which directly affects the nesting success of the finches. Nests in urban areas are built using artificial materials, such as plastic, fishing lines, paper, and human hair. These materials cause death of the birds by strangulation, ingestion, and/or entanglement. Urban areas provide more reproductive success, however medium ground finches suffer by the usage of human-related debris in their nests. 97% of the Galápagos Islands are protected national parks, however the increasing population causes more dense urban areas. The islands are easily affected by anthropogenic changes, and urban development has a large impact on the environment, ecology, and evolution of the native species. The environmental changes such as increasing light pollution and noise directly affect the finches. Urbanization causes disruptions in ecological interactions, influencing selection pressures which causes phenotypes to be selectively modified. Areas of increased urbanization seem to have a lesser density of medium ground finches, as the abundance of humans leads to an abundance of food.

== Behavior ==
=== General feeding and changes in feeding behaviors ===
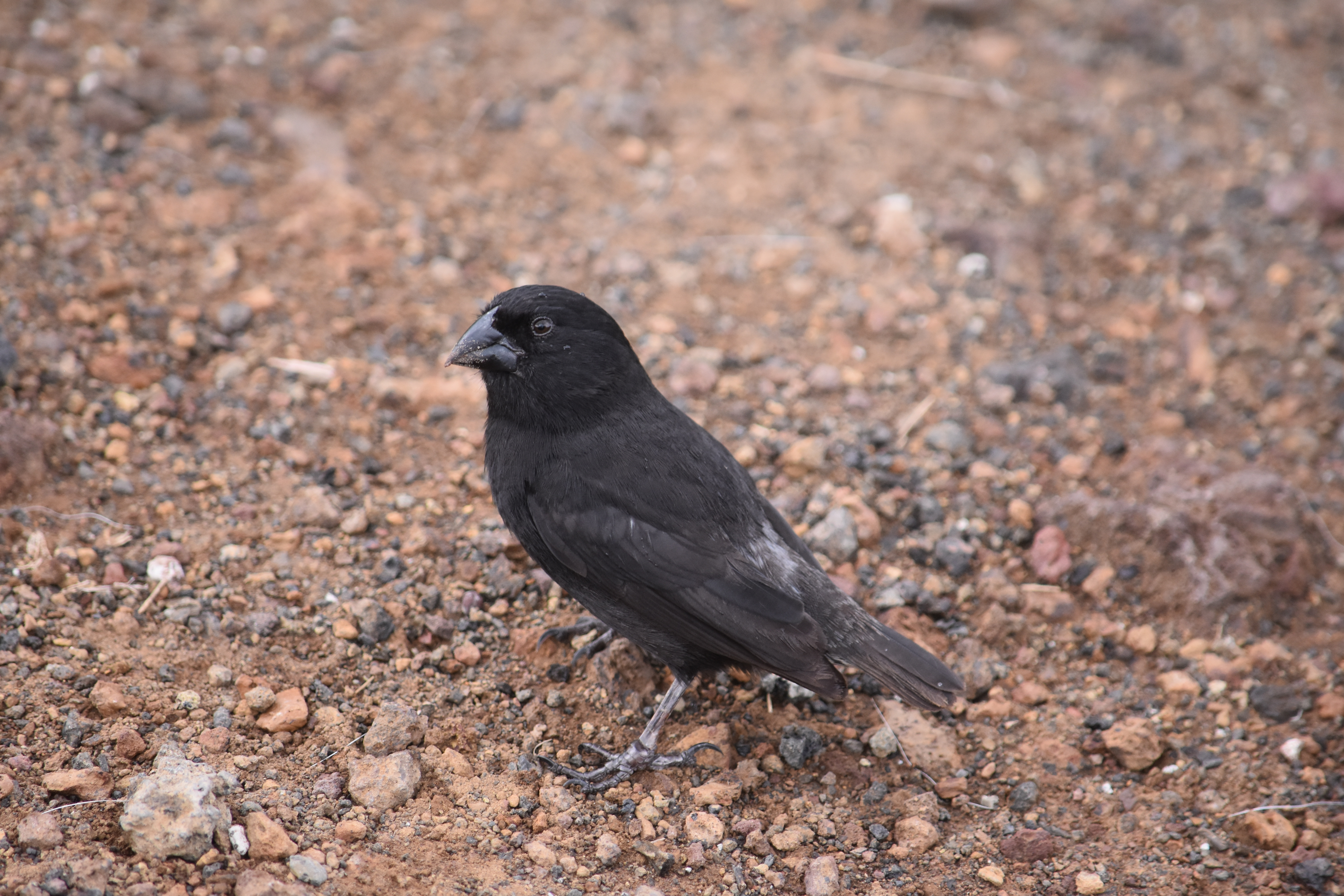
Male medium ground finch foraging on the ground on Floreana Island

The medium ground finch feeds primarily on seeds, although it is also known to eat flowers, buds, and young leaves, and the occasional insect. It forages either on the ground or in low vegetation. In urban areas, these birds exhibit a strong preference for human food items over their natural food sources. Scientists have found that due to urbanization, medium ground finches have access to a variety of food, such as human food. Food has been a selecting agent for the various beak sizes present on the Galápagos Islands; this shows natural selection at its finest, where those who are best adapted to their environment will most likely survive and reproduce.

Scientists have found that due to urbanization, medium ground finches are showing changes in the size and shape of their beaks. Scientists conducted an experiment to observe the change in behaviors for feeding preferences among these finches; they found that the food the finches ate depended on the location they were found. The scientists observed feeding behaviors in four different locations with various levels of urbanization and tourist levels. In areas of high urbanization with high tourism, finches preferred to eat human food, whereas those finches located in more rural areas ate foods present in the area. The scientists also observed that finches, when given the preference between eating mainly human food or natural foods, chose to eat human food. Urbanization has caused an influence on feeding behaviors and preferences among medium ground finches.

Changes in feeding preferences can influence survival and reproduction. Further research has been conducted to determine why medium ground finches may be preferring human food rather than natural food sources. Researchers found that birds can detect bitter, sugary, and salty foods; each provides the bird with information. The bitter foods tell the birds that certain foods may be toxic; sugary foods have high calorie gains, and salty foods have high contents of salt. In the study, beak wiping after eating human food indicated that the bird did not like the food that was just consumed; researchers found that medium ground finches in remote areas wiped their beaks when given any type of human foods, specifically oily type foods, while ground finches in more urbanized areas fed more on sweet foods and wiped their beaks less than those in rural areas. Finches in more urbanized areas have more access to human food; and therefore more calorie-rich sweet foods. Food availability can shift depending on wet and dry seasons; this may affect birds in rural areas more than those in urban areas who have abundant access to human food. The amount of food available and the type of food rural and urban medium ground finches prefer to eat can effect whether birds will be more likely to adapt to changes in their environment and survive and reproduce.

Medium ground finches eat the seeds of Tribulus cistoides, a low-lying flowering plant. Scientists tested whether urbanization would impact feeding behaviors on T. cistoides. Scientists found that there was a 1.25% increase on feeding on T. cistoides seeds in more urbanized towns rather than natural habitats. This suggests that medium ground finches located in towns or urbanized areas have a stronger preference for small mericarps than do those living in natural habitats. Scientists found that due to increased dispersal of the seeds of T. cistoides through birds and urbanization (such as seeds being dispersed by human activity), there are more mericarps available in towns; this may be why more medium ground finches are foraging seeds from small mericarps. Overall, due to urbanization, there has been an increase in interactions between medium ground finches and T. cistoides due to the increased seed dispersal.

=== Inbreeding and nesting behaviors ===
Inbreeding is said to affect medium ground finches; in years with low food availability, inbreeding increases, and this decreases reproductive success. In years with high food availability, inbreeding decreases and reproductive success increases. Finches in urban areas have more food availability than natural habitats due to human food, and due to this, reproductive success increases. This is how natural selection can occur: the birds' environment can influence the success of offspring and can possibly bring about evolution of finches in urban areas. Even though finches in urban areas have higher reproductive success, they still exhibit mortality due to human pollutants such as plastic being trapped in nests. Overall, birds in urban areas have better outcomes for nesting than those birds in the natural habitat due to food availability. Birds in urban areas can become more adapted through having better reproductive and nesting success; this can influence a higher survival rate in urban areas.

== Climate change ==
Due to climate change, El Niño and La Niña are expected to occur more frequently. The amount of rainfall in the Galápagos is directly correlated to the amount of food. During dry years many finches will die of starvation, with individuals capable of surviving in the harsh drought environment surviving. In a La Niña year, low precipitation results in the scarcity of food for finches, causing low reproductive success, while higher precipitation during El Niño years leads to an abundance of food, which can enhance breeding success, allowing finches to produce up to twice as many eggs. The favorable conditions of an El Niño year and the unfavorable conditions of a La Niña year influence the physical characteristics of the finches and their evolution.

Medium ground finches are dependent on food for survival, specifically seeds. If a change was to occur to the population it would be because of natural selection. In 1977, the drought caused a decrease in medium ground finches with smaller beak size living because of the rare small seeds available. It was the Grants that observed beak size had increased by 4% because only finches that knew how to eat larger seeds were able to survive and reproduce. In 1982, it rained heavily and there was an abundance of small seeds again. This led to a 2.5% decrease in beak size of medium ground finches, so it was easier and more efficient for the finches to eat the seeds. In this year large ground finches appeared. Then in 2004, there was a drought again, but the large ground finch species took over on the larger seeds that had become available, and it led to competition with medium ground finches with large beaks. The large ground finches had a better advantage and a lot of medium ground finches with large beaks died out and only the ones with smaller beaks were able to survive. With the climate changes occurring, medium ground finches would be able to survive because of their ability to adapt with droughts or heavy rain.

== Parasites ==
The medium ground finch has been under parasitism of the fly Philornis downsi as well as the avian pox virus (Poxvirus avium).

=== Philornis downsi ===
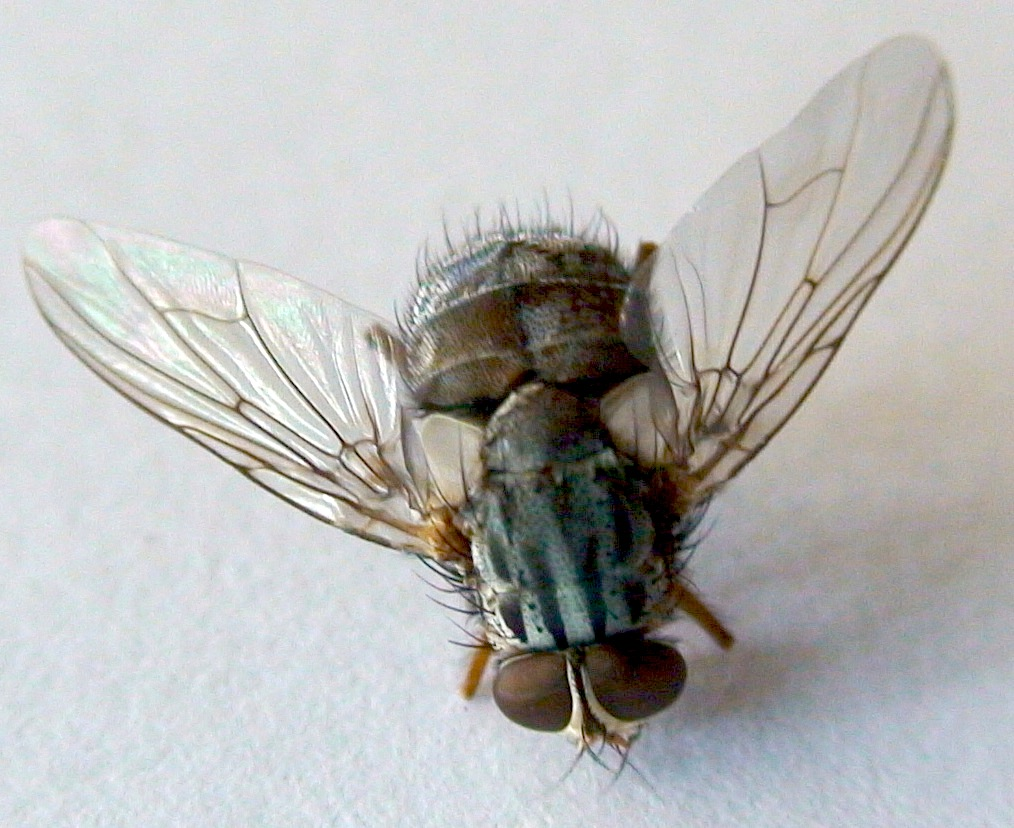
The fly Philornis downsi has had an influence on the population of medium ground finches. These flies have altered survival among some nestlings of medium ground finches. These flies contribute to natural selection as some medium ground finches develop the antibodies to survive.

The parasitic fly Philornis downsi was first documented in 1997; documentation of the parasite was found in the Galápagos finches. The adult flies lay eggs in the nests of birds. When those eggs hatch, larvae will feed off of the blood of the birds' offspring. The Philornis flies lay eggs in the nest including in the nestlings' nostrils. The larvae feed on living tissue and in worst cases can perforate the bill. The parasites will even feed off of the blood of the female adult. Even with the data presenting that larvae do attempt to feed on adult female mothers, the feeding on adult mothers may fail. The feeding on adult females or its attempt to provides the female with exposure to the Philornis downsi antigens. Females are said to develop higher amounts of Philornis antibodies; this does correlate as females are mostly tending to the nestlings in the nest. Scientists require to do more studies, however, they have thought of possible advantages of adult females' exposure to such antigens as it may cause an advantage for their nestlings where antibodies can be transferred to their offspring. This can provide the offspring with an advantage and increase their survival. The survival of nestling birds from the fly will vary; sometimes Philornis downsi will have little effect on nestlings and sometimes Philornis downsi will cause none of the nestlings in a nest to survive. Studies conducted on medium ground finches on the island of Santa Cruz found that these finches are at risk. Scientists believe that within the next century, extinction of the medium ground finches can occur on the island of Santa Cruz; the Philornis downsi is showing a negative effect on the medium ground finches of Santa Cruz. Using a new mathematical model, a 2015 study suggested the population of 270,000 birds on Santa Cruz may become extinct in 50 years. In the Galápagos Islands there has been no indication of bird extinctions, however, this may become a possibility as more people begin to inhabit and visit the area, introducing parasites. Possible solutions include the introduction of parasitic wasps which would lay eggs on the larva, or cotton wool treated with a pesticide which the adult birds would use when constructing the nest.

=== Avian pox virus ===
Avian pox virus is another factor that may affect the survival of medium ground finches. Avian pox virus is a virus that affects about 200 species of birds; of those 200, finches are especially affected. Avian pox can be spread through mosquitos. Mosquitos are the spreading factors, meaning once they have fed from an infected bird, they can transmit the virus to those who are not infected. Birds can also transmit the virus to one another through contact. The symptoms of birds being infected are wart-like growths that are present on feather-less areas on the bird, like their feet, legs, and beaks. Outbreaks of the virus have been historically rare. In 2008, there was an outbreak that showed to be present in 50% of the finches tested. The outbreaks of the virus can vary as there was an outbreak of the virus at Daphne Major between 1983 and 2008; studies showed that by 2008, half of the bird populations showed symptoms for the virus. In 2008 at El Garrapatero, out of 129 birds that were observed, zero showed symptoms of the virus. The difference in how the virus affected the birds in both regions shows how some birds were able to build the antibodies to survive and escape infection. These birds were more adapted to survive and reproduce in their environment. Finches have developed antibodies to fight specific invasive parasites. The finches with the highest amount of antibodies tend to have the highest fitness, and therefore produce more viable offspring. Those with antibodies are better adapted to possible exposures, and are therefore more likely to survive and reproduce; the offspring of those with antibodies will also be better adapted and allow the finch species to eventually have better success in their environment; this is natural selection at its core.
