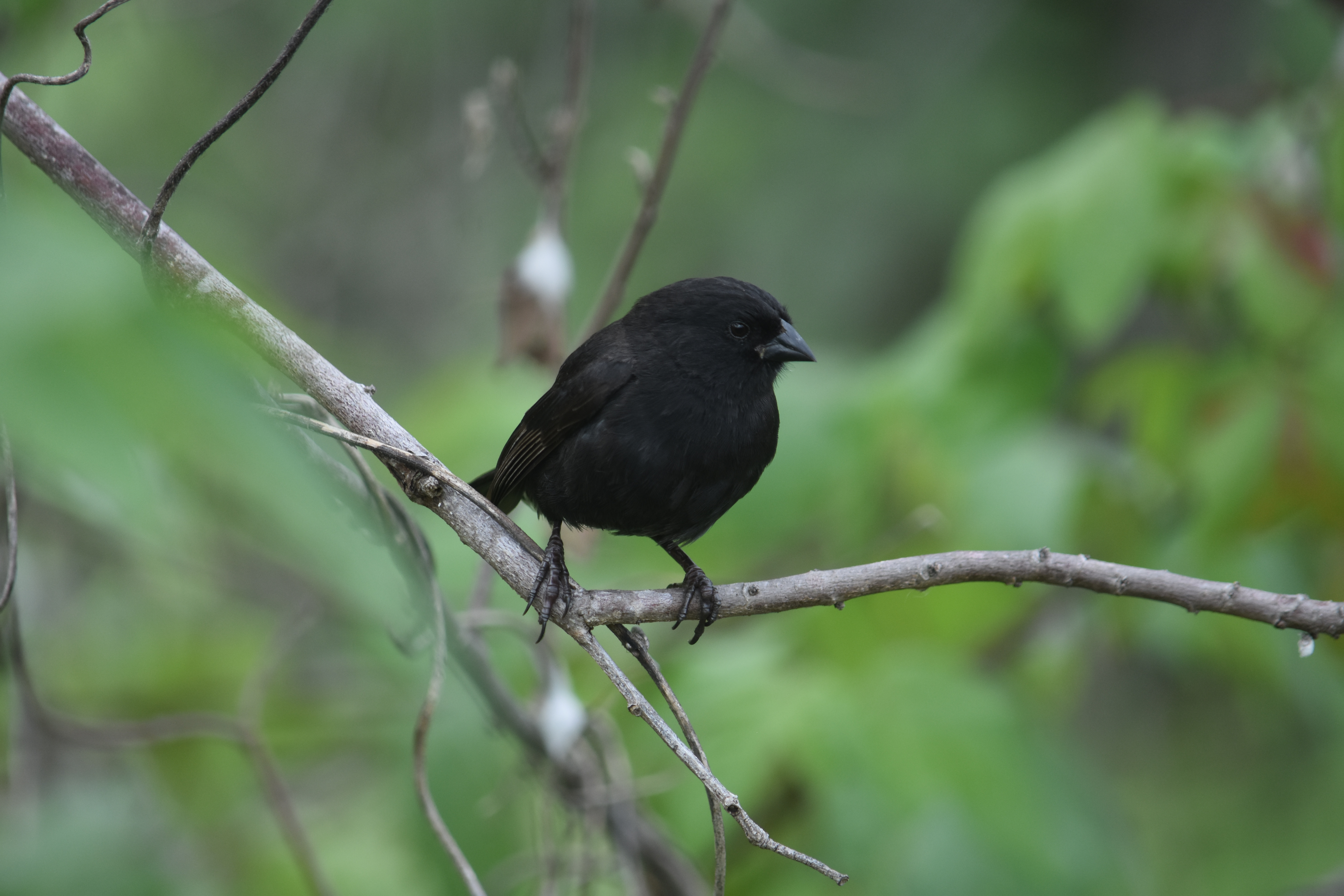
- male, Floreana Island
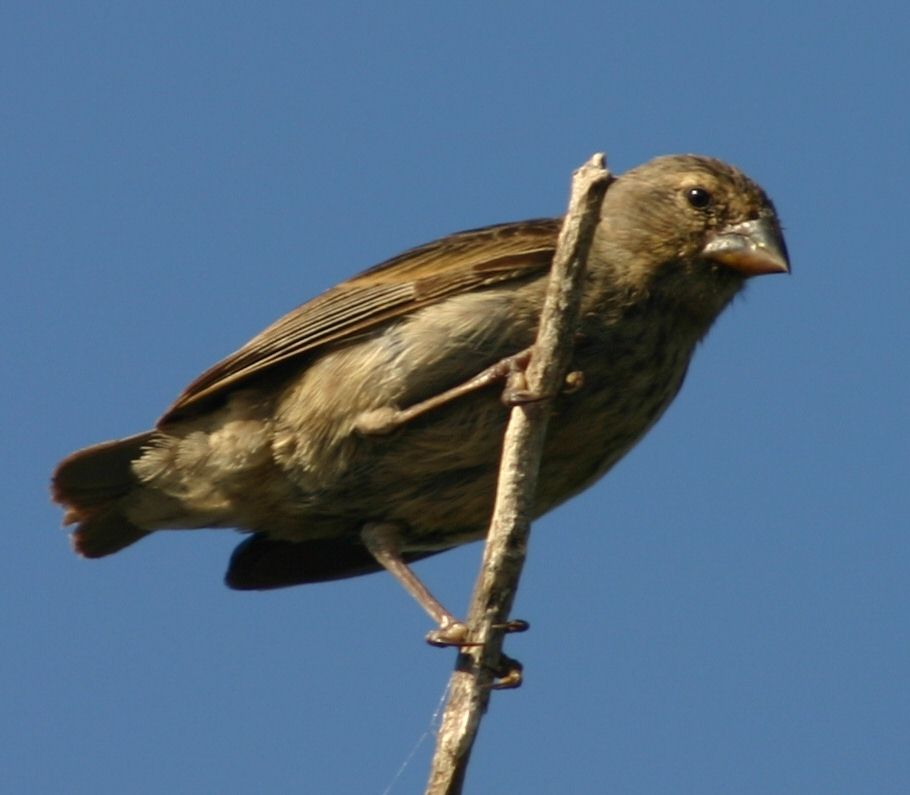
- female, Fernandino Island

Conservation status
- Least Concern (IUCN 3.1)

Scientific classification
- Kingdom: Animalia
- Phylum: Chordata
- Class: Aves
- Order: Passeriformes
- Family: Thraupidae
- Genus: Geospiza
- Species: G. fuliginosa

Binomial name
- Geospiza fuliginosa Gould, 1837

= Small ground finch =

Species of bird

The small ground finch (Geospiza fuliginosa) is a species of bird in the tanager family Thraupidae. Endemic to the Galápagos Islands, it is common and widespread in shrubland, woodland, and other habitats on most islands in the archipelago. It commonly feeds on small seeds and parasites from the skins of Galápagos land and marine iguanas and Galápagos tortoises.

== Taxonomy and systematics ==
The small ground finch is one of Darwin's finches, a group of closely related birds which evolved on the Galápagos Islands. The group is related to the Tiaris grassquits, which are found in South America and the Caribbean.

When Charles Darwin first collected the species in 1835, he thought it was a finch. John Gould, who officially described Darwin's specimens, agreed, placing it in the genus Fringilla with the Old World finches. By 1841, Gould had changed his mind, moving this and five other species into the new genus Geospiza — still a genus of finches, but distinct from those of the Old World. DNA research has now shown that all of Darwin's "finches" are actually tanagers.

The name Geospiza is a combination of the Greek words geo-, meaning "ground-", and spiza, meaning finch. The specific name fuliginosa is late Latin for "sooty".

It is known to hybridize (rarely) with the medium ground finch.

== Description ==
The small ground finch is the smallest of the ground finches, measuring 11 cm (4.3 in) in length. (Note: By convention, length is measured from the tip of the bill to the tip of the tail on a dead bird (or skin) laid on its back.) Its beak is short and pointed, with a slightly curved culmen. On average, its beak is smaller than that of the medium ground finch, but there is a significant overlap in size between the two, particularly on islands where only one of the two species exists. On islands where the two species compete directly, the difference between their beaks are greater. The male is black with white-tipped undertail coverts, while the female and young are brown with streaked underparts. There are observable phenotypic differences between finches that live in lowlands and ones that live in highlands, and this change is most likely attributed to adaptation. The finches seen in highlands have larger, more pointed beaks and smaller feet and claws compared to the lowland variety. These finches are on a cline (series of biocommunities on a continuous gradient), and individuals in the hybrid zone have intermediate traits. This is an example of parapatric speciation, where the elevation gradient of 560 meters causes differentiation in traits, but hybrids are well adapted in their "hybrid zone."

== Habitat and range ==
Like all but one of the other Darwin's finches, the small ground finch is endemic to the Galápagos Islands. Abundant and widespread, it is found on every island in the archipelago except for the Genovesa, Wolf and Darwin islands. It is most common in arid coastal and transition areas, though it moves into the highlands following the breeding season.

== Behavior ==
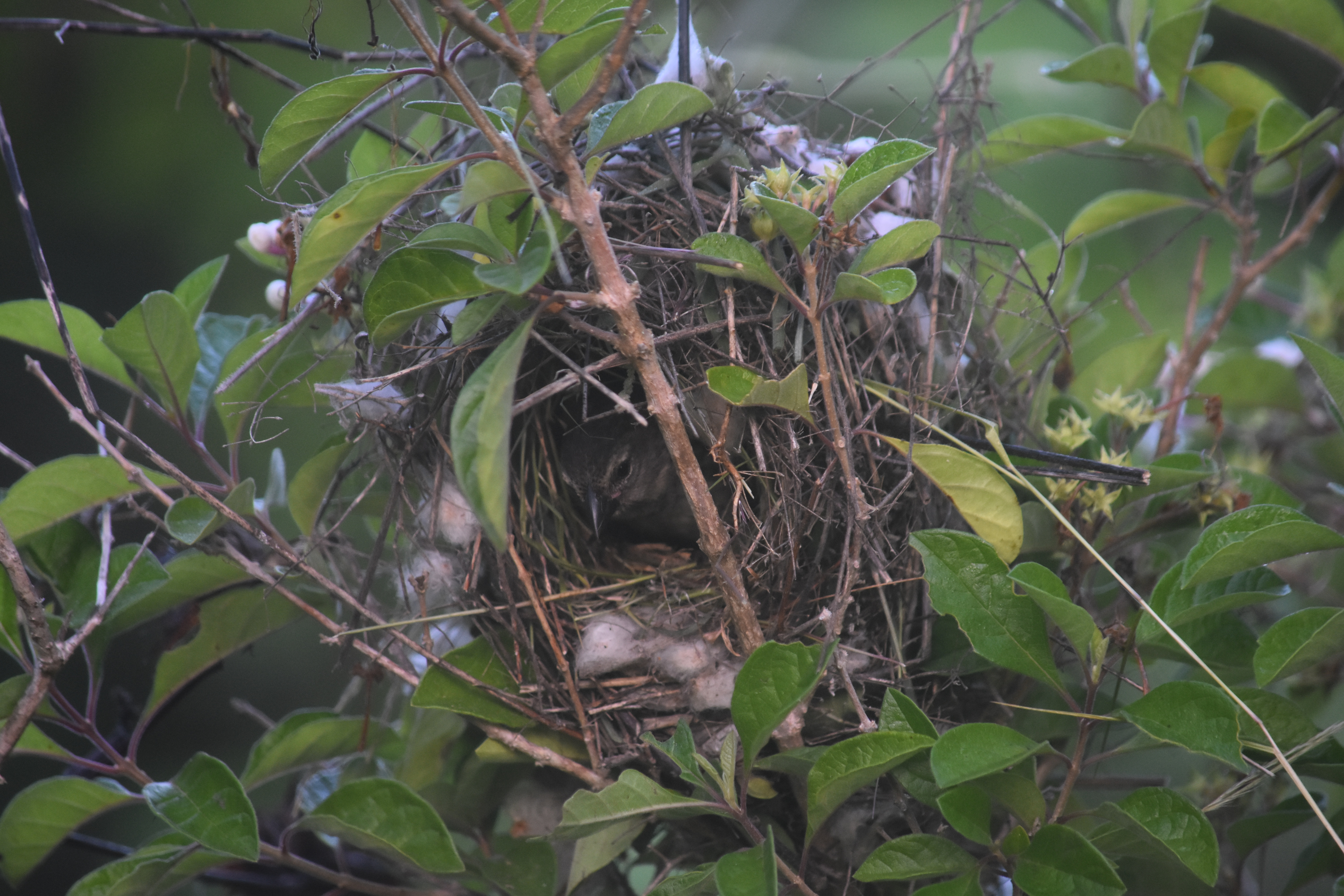
Female small ground finch inside her nest during nest-building, on Floreana Island

=== Feeding ===
Like the other Galápagos ground finches, the small ground finch is an omnivore with a preference for vegetable matter. It feeds primarily on the ground or in low vegetation, eating seeds, buds, flowers, leaves and the occasional insect. It forms symbiotic relationships with Galápagos tortoises and both marine and Galápagos land iguanas by gleaning parasites from their skins.

=== Voice ===
The small ground finch's song is rapid and weak and is transcribed as "twichooo-twichooo" or "teur-weee".

== Conservation and threats ==
Although the population size of the small ground finch has not been quantified, it is described as common across the Galápagos, and the International Union for Conservation of Nature lists it as a species of Least Concern. Its numbers seem to be stable, and neither its population size nor its range size appear to approach thresholds for concern. However, like all endemic wildlife on the Galápagos Islands, it is impacted by some human activities, including fires, overgrazing by domestic and feral animals, and the introduction of exotic species. It is found in ten of the Important Bird Areas established on the islands. The species suffers from high mortality rates from the parasitic fly, ranging from 16% to 95% over a four-year period (2002–2006).
