= Genovesa cactus finch =

Conservation status
- Vulnerable (IUCN 3.1)

Scientific classification
- Kingdom: Animalia
- Phylum: Chordata
- Class: Aves
- Order: Passeriformes
- Family: Thraupidae
- Genus: Geospiza
- Species: G. propinqua

Binomial name
- Geospiza propinqua Ridgway, 1894

Species of bird

The Genovesa cactus finch (Geospiza propinqua) is a species of bird in the tanager family Thraupidae. It is one of Darwin's finches, and is endemic to the Galápagos islands, Ecuador, where it is restricted to Genovesa Island.

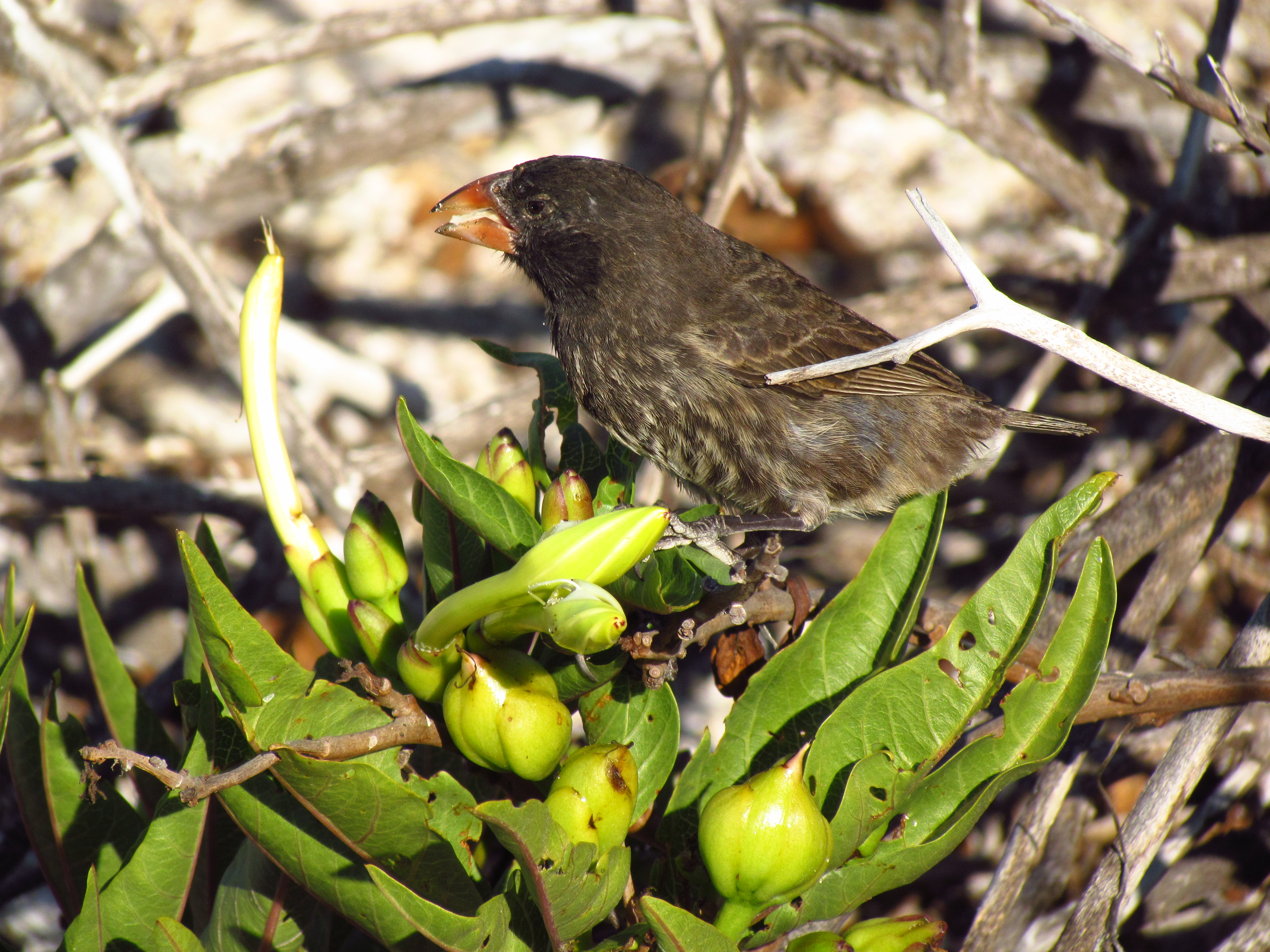
female bird

Its natural habitat is dry shrubland and it is commonly seen on the ground. Its main food source is the cactus Opuntia.

== Taxonomy ==
The large cactus finch is one of Darwin's finches, a group of closely related birds which evolved on the Galápagos Islands. The group is related to the Tiaris grassquits, which are found in South America and the Caribbean. An ancestral relative of those grassquits arrived on the Galápagos Islands some 2–3 million years ago, and the Española cactus finch is one of the species which evolved from that ancestor.

Some taxonomic authorities, including the International Ornithologists' Union, have split the species from the Española cactus finch. Others still consider them conspecific.
