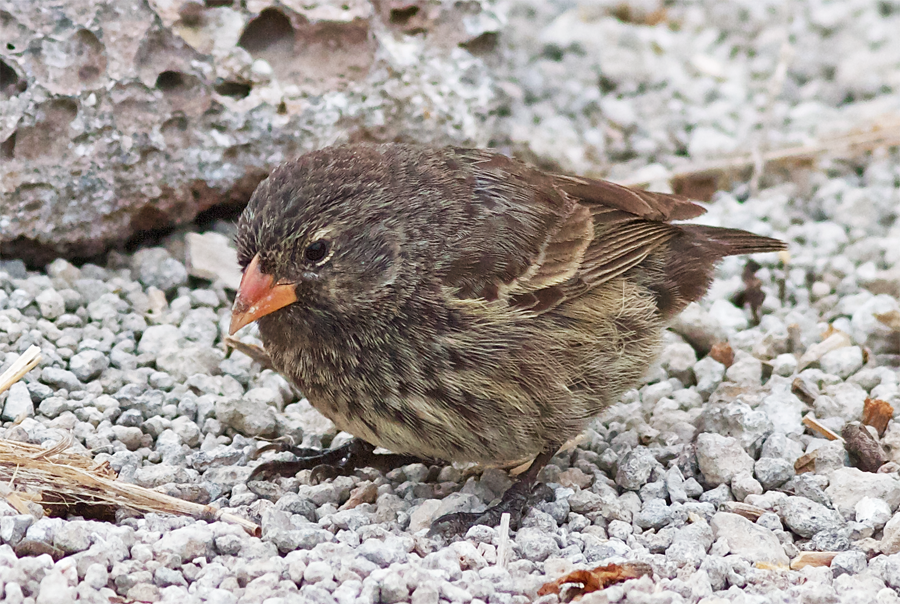
- Female on Floreana Island

Conservation status
- Least Concern (IUCN 3.1)

Scientific classification
- Kingdom: Animalia
- Phylum: Chordata
- Class: Aves
- Order: Passeriformes
- Family: Thraupidae
- Genus: Geospiza
- Species: G. difficilis

Binomial name
- Geospiza difficilis Sharpe, 1888

= Sharp-beaked ground finch =

Species of bird

The sharp-beaked ground finch (Geospiza difficilis) is a species of bird in the Darwin's finch group of the tanager family Thraupidae, and it is native to the Galápagos Islands. It has a mass of around 20 grams (0.71 oz) and the males have black plumage, while females have streaked grey plumage. This finch was described by Richard Bowdler Sharpe in 1888.

This relatively small, slender-billed finch is found on Fernandina, Santiago, Pinta, formerly Santa Cruz and Floreana. It breeds in the humid highlands and disperses afterwards. It is possible it still occurs on Isabela.

Both the vampire ground finch and the Genovesa ground finch were considered subspecies. The International Ornithologists' Union have split them based on strong genetic, morphological, and song evidence, while other taxonomic authorities still consider them conspecific.
