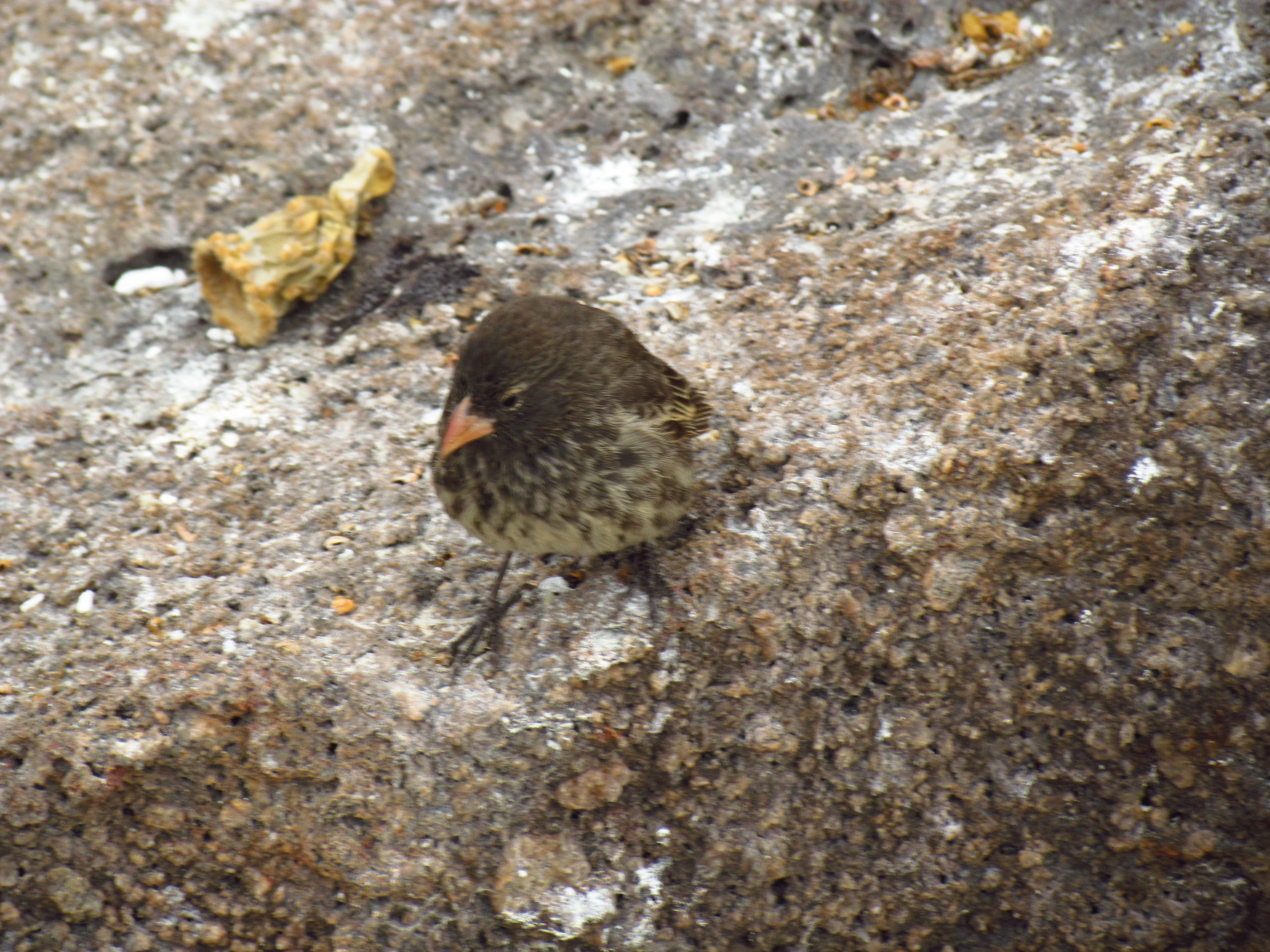

Conservation status
- Vulnerable (IUCN 3.1)

Scientific classification
- Kingdom: Animalia
- Phylum: Chordata
- Class: Aves
- Order: Passeriformes
- Family: Thraupidae
- Genus: Geospiza
- Species: G. acutirostris

Binomial name
- Geospiza acutirostris Ridgway, 1894

Synonyms
- Geospiza difficilis acutirostris

= Genovesa ground finch =

Species of bird

The Genovesa ground finch (Geospiza acutirostris) is a small bird native to the Galápagos Islands. It was considered a subspecies of the sharp-beaked ground finch (Geospiza difficilis) endemic to Genovesa Island. The International Ornithologists' Union has split the species. Other taxonomic authorities still consider it conspecific.

In the whole-genome phylogeny of Lamichhaney et al. (2017), G. acutirostris is shown to be very far from G. difficilis. In fact, G. difficilis does not fall in the same part of the tree as other Geospiza.
