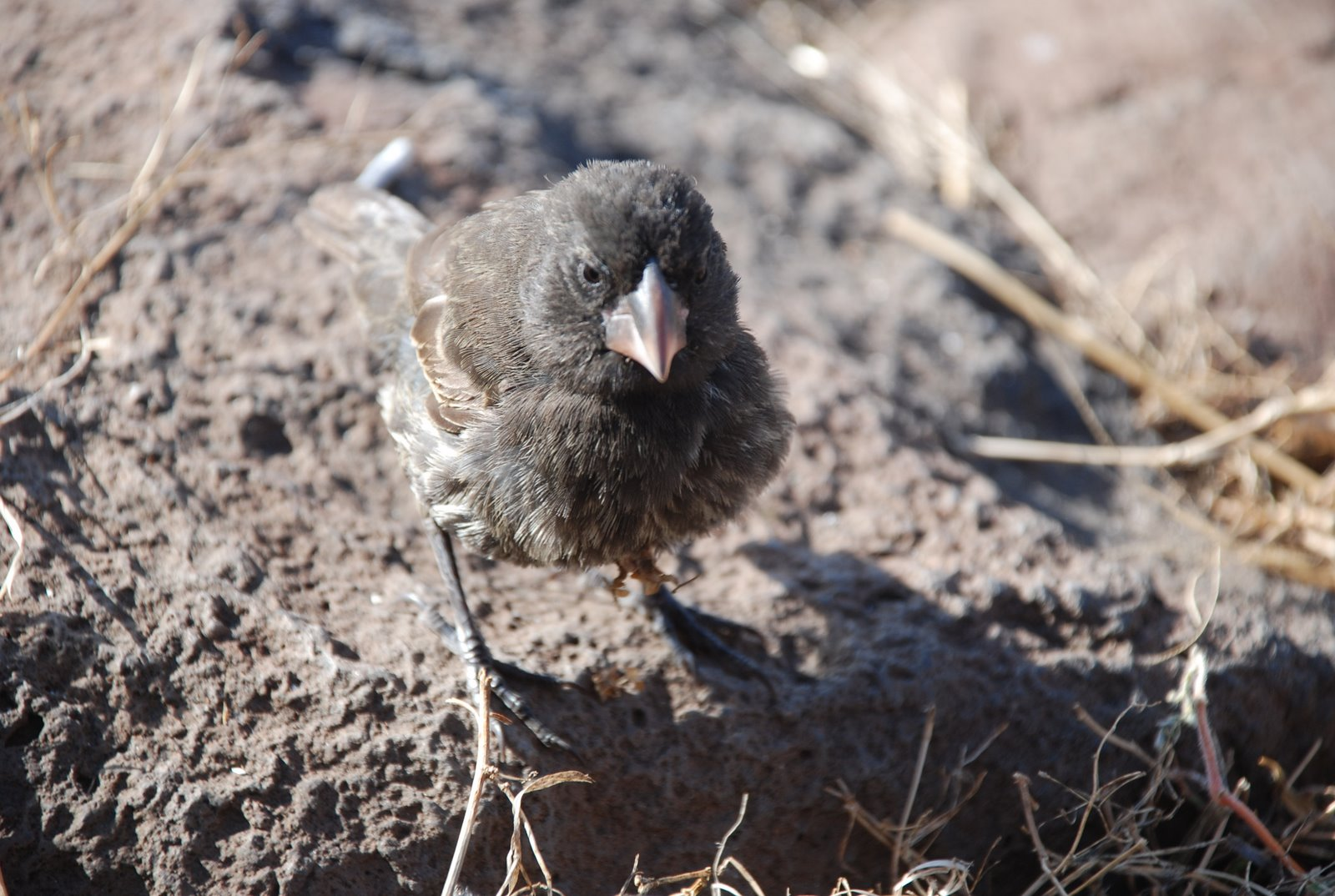
- On Española Island, the Galápagos Islands, Ecuador

Conservation status
- Vulnerable (IUCN 3.1)

Scientific classification
- Kingdom: Animalia
- Phylum: Chordata
- Class: Aves
- Order: Passeriformes
- Family: Thraupidae
- Genus: Geospiza
- Species: G. conirostris

Binomial name
- Geospiza conirostris Ridgway, 1890

= Española cactus finch =

Española Ground-Finch

Species of bird

The Española cactus finch (Geospiza conirostris) is a species of bird in the tanager family Thraupidae. It is one of Darwin's finches, and is endemic to the Galápagos islands, where it is restricted to Española, Genovesa, and the Darwin and Wolf Islands. This rather dark bird resembles the smaller and finer-beaked common cactus finch, but the two species do not co-inhabit any island.

Its natural habitat is dry shrubland and it is commonly seen on the ground. Its main food source is the cactus Opuntia.

== Taxonomy ==
The Española cactus finch is one of Darwin's finches, a group of closely related birds that evolved on the Galápagos Islands. The group is related to the Tiaris grassquits, which are found in South America and the Caribbean. An ancestral relative of those grassquits arrived on the Galápagos Islands some 2–3 million years ago, and the Española cactus finch is one of the species that evolved from that ancestor.

From a study done in 2015, the Española cactus finch of Española was found to be a sister to the large ground finch, not to the Genovesa cactus finch. The International Ornithologists' Union has changed the taxonomy based on the study. Other taxonomic authorities have kept the large cactus finch and the Genovesa cactus finch conspecific.

== Genetic speciation ==
The Española cactus finch first arrived in Daphne Major in 1981, when it was observed to be a newcomer by Peter and Rosemary Grant. This has enabled scientists to trace changes in its genome: it originally interbred with local finches (G. fortis) but has ceased to do so in later generations. The new descendants have become a distinct species. It is the first example of speciation to be directly observed by scientists in the field. Subsequent genetic research suggests that genes for beak shape (ALX1) and beak size (HMGA2) may be crucial in separating the hybridized species from local finches. Genes relating to the finches' song may also be involved.

== Description ==
The Española cactus finch is among the largest of the Darwin's finches, measuring 15 cm (5.9 in) in length. The male is black, with white-tipped undertail coverts. Female and immature birds range in color from dull gray to matte black, and frequently show white edges to the feathers of their underparts.

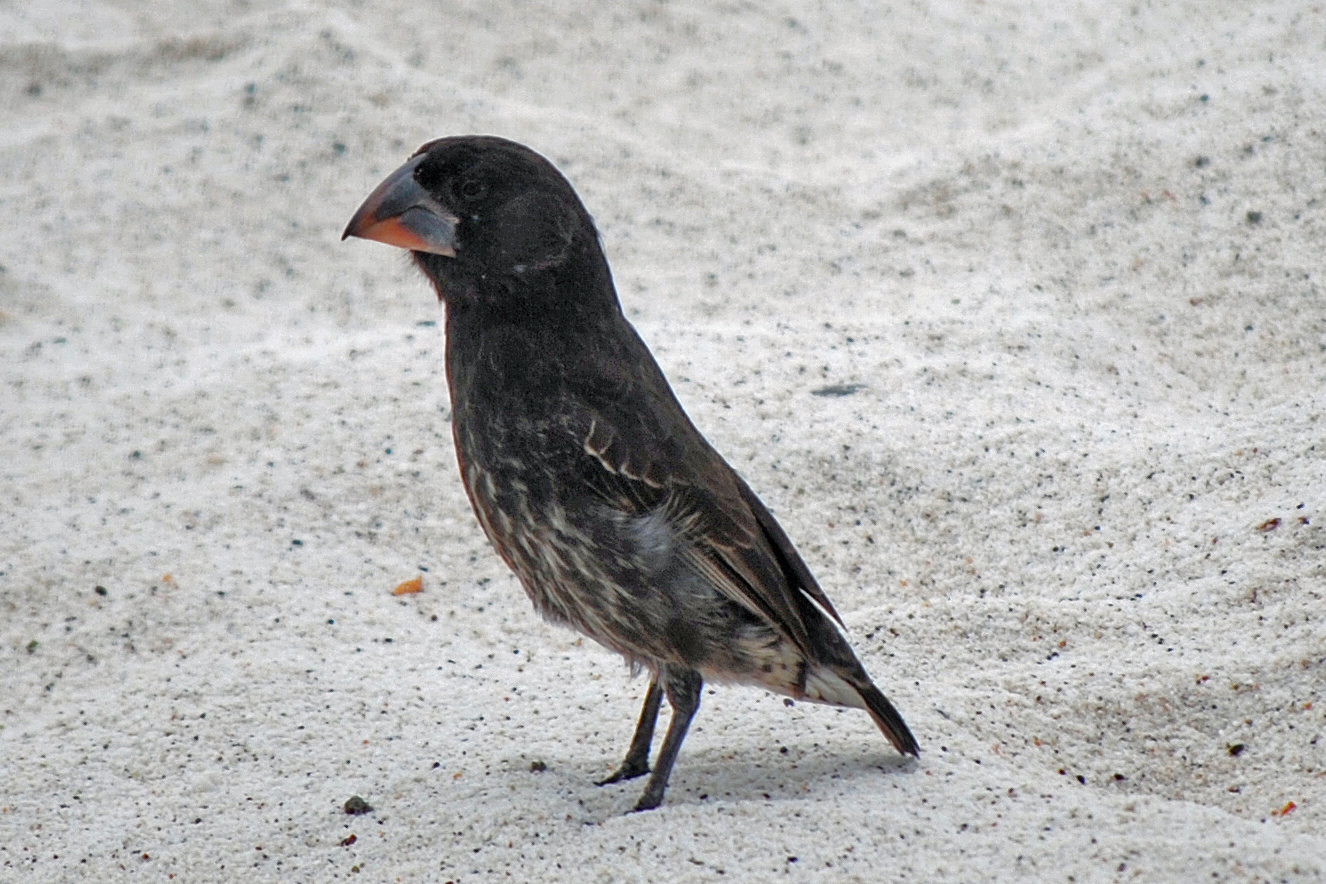
Female on Española

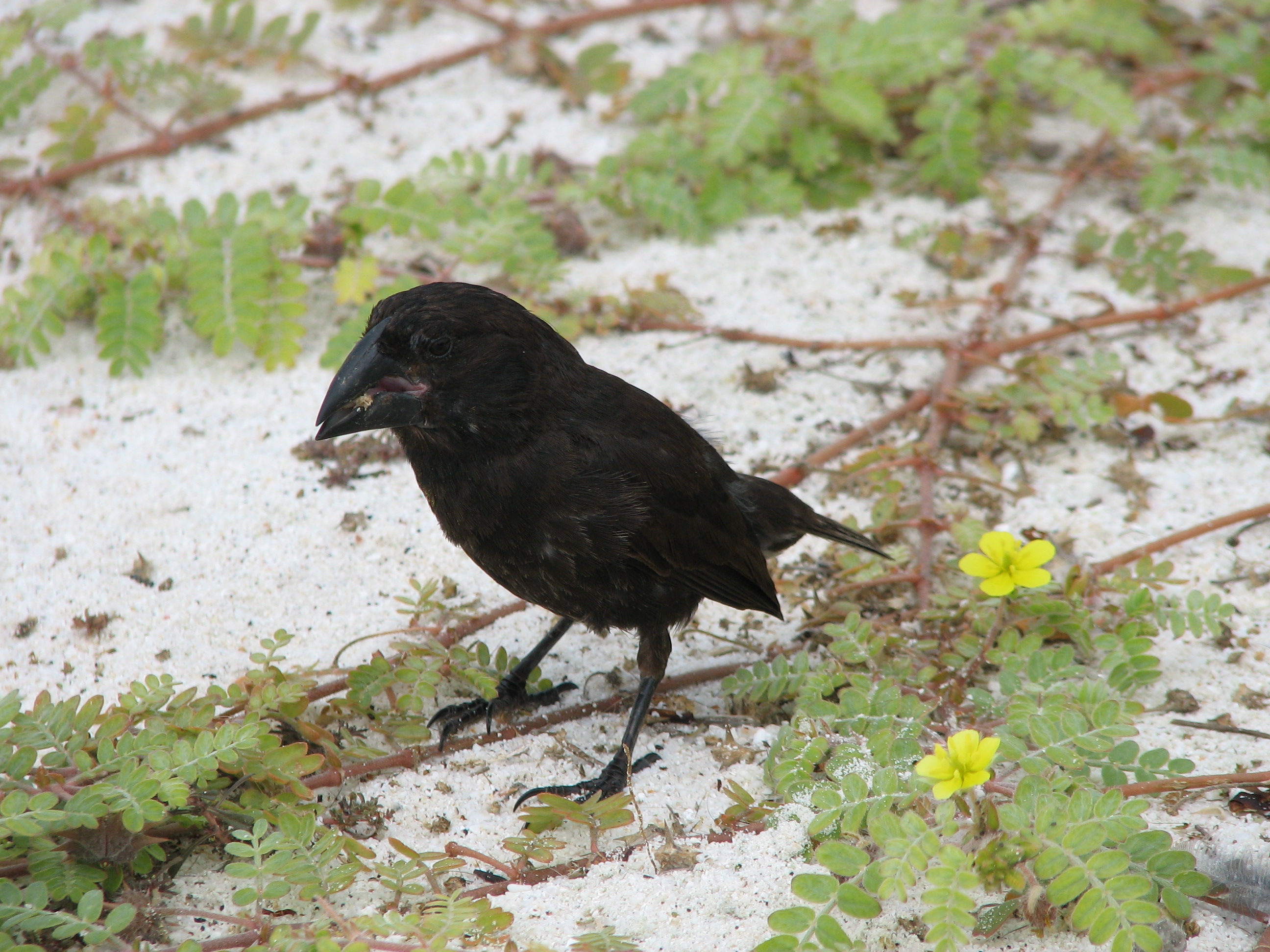
Male on Española
