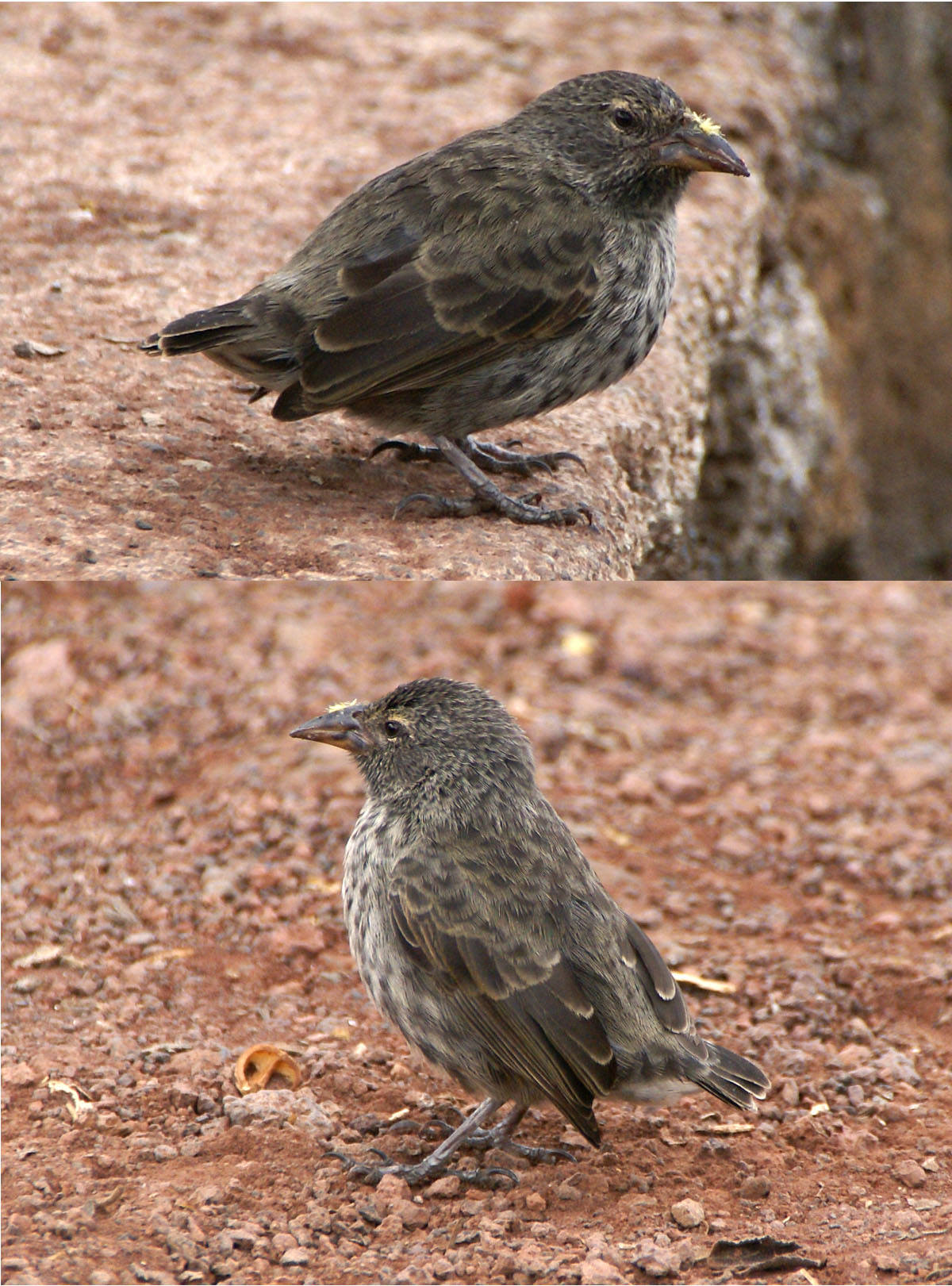

Conservation status
- Least Concern (IUCN 3.1)

Scientific classification
- Kingdom: Animalia
- Phylum: Chordata
- Class: Aves
- Order: Passeriformes
- Family: Thraupidae
- Genus: Geospiza
- Species: G. scandens

Binomial name
- Geospiza scandens (Gould, 1837)

= Common cactus finch =

Species of bird

The common cactus finch or small cactus finch (Geospiza scandens) is a species of bird in the Darwin's finch group of the tanager family Thraupidae. It is endemic to the Galapagos Islands, where it is found on most islands, with the notable exception of Fernandina, Española, Genovesa, Darwin and Wolf. Most of these islands are inhabited by its close relative, the Española cactus finch.

Its natural habitats are dry scrubland and woodland. It is often closely associated with the cactus Opuntia.

== Taxonomy ==
The common cactus finch is one of nine species in the genus Geospiza, part of a group of closely related species known as Darwin's finches. There are four recognized subspecies:

- G. s. abingdoni is found on Pinta.
- G. s. intermedia is found on Santa Fé, Floreana, Santa Cruz, Isabela and Pinzón.
- G. s. rothschildi is found on Marchesa.

G. s. scandens is found on Santiago and Rábida.

== Habitat and range ==
Found in the arid zone of many of the islands in the Galápagos, the common cactus finch is rarely far from areas of Opuntia cactus.

== Gallery ==
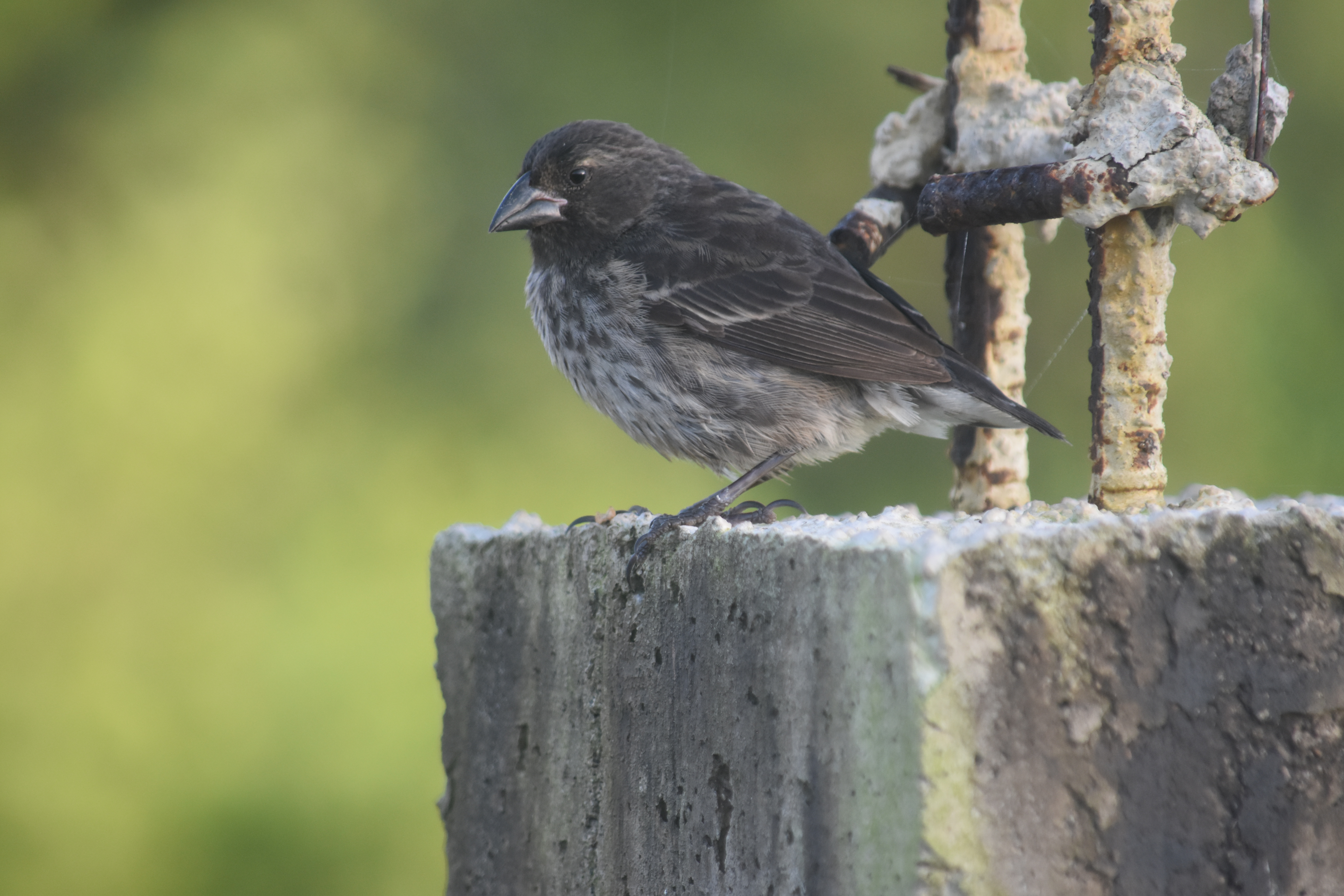
Female on Floreana Island
