= Daphne Major =

Volcanic island in the Galápagos Archipelago

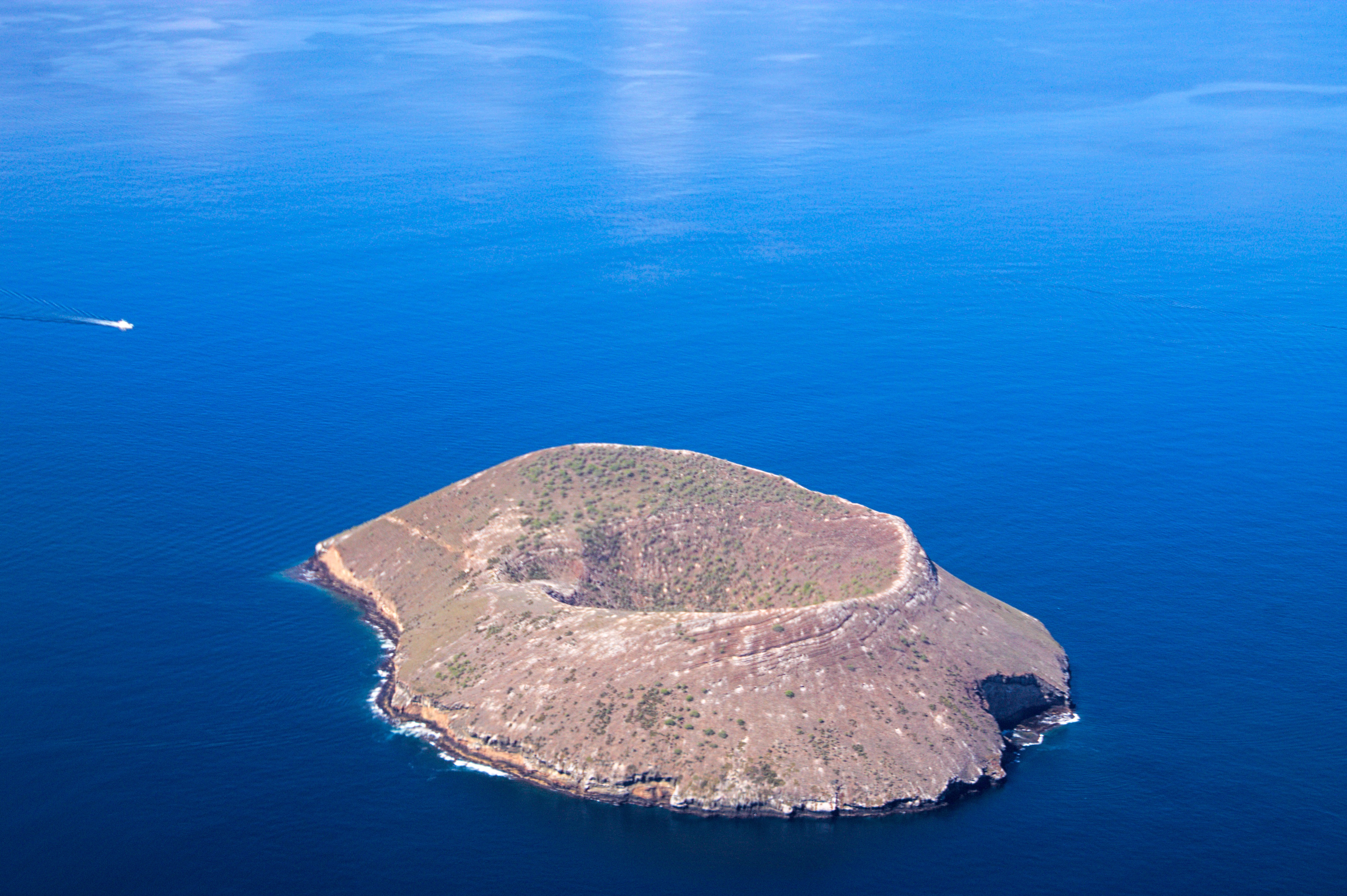
- Coordinates: 0°25′20″S 90°22′19″W

Daphne Major is a volcanic island just north of Santa Cruz Island and just west of the Baltra Airport in the Archipelago of Colón, commonly known as the Galápagos Islands. It consists of a tuff crater, devoid of trees, whose rim rises 120 m (394 ft) above the sea.

Though easily accessible to most visitors to the Galápagos, the national park service has highly restricted visits to this island, and it is primarily used for scientific research. Daphne Major finches are the main source of the understanding of animal evolution in the Galápagos. An intensive study of Darwin's finches was conducted here by biologists Peter and Rosemary Grant over a period of 20 years. They examined the behaviour and life cycles of the finches, demonstrating the role of natural selection in producing biological evolution. Their efforts were documented in the Pulitzer Prize–winning book The Beak of the Finch.

Daphne is home to a variety of other birds including Galápagos martins, blue-footed booby, Nazca booby, short-eared owls, red-billed tropicbirds and magnificent frigatebirds.
