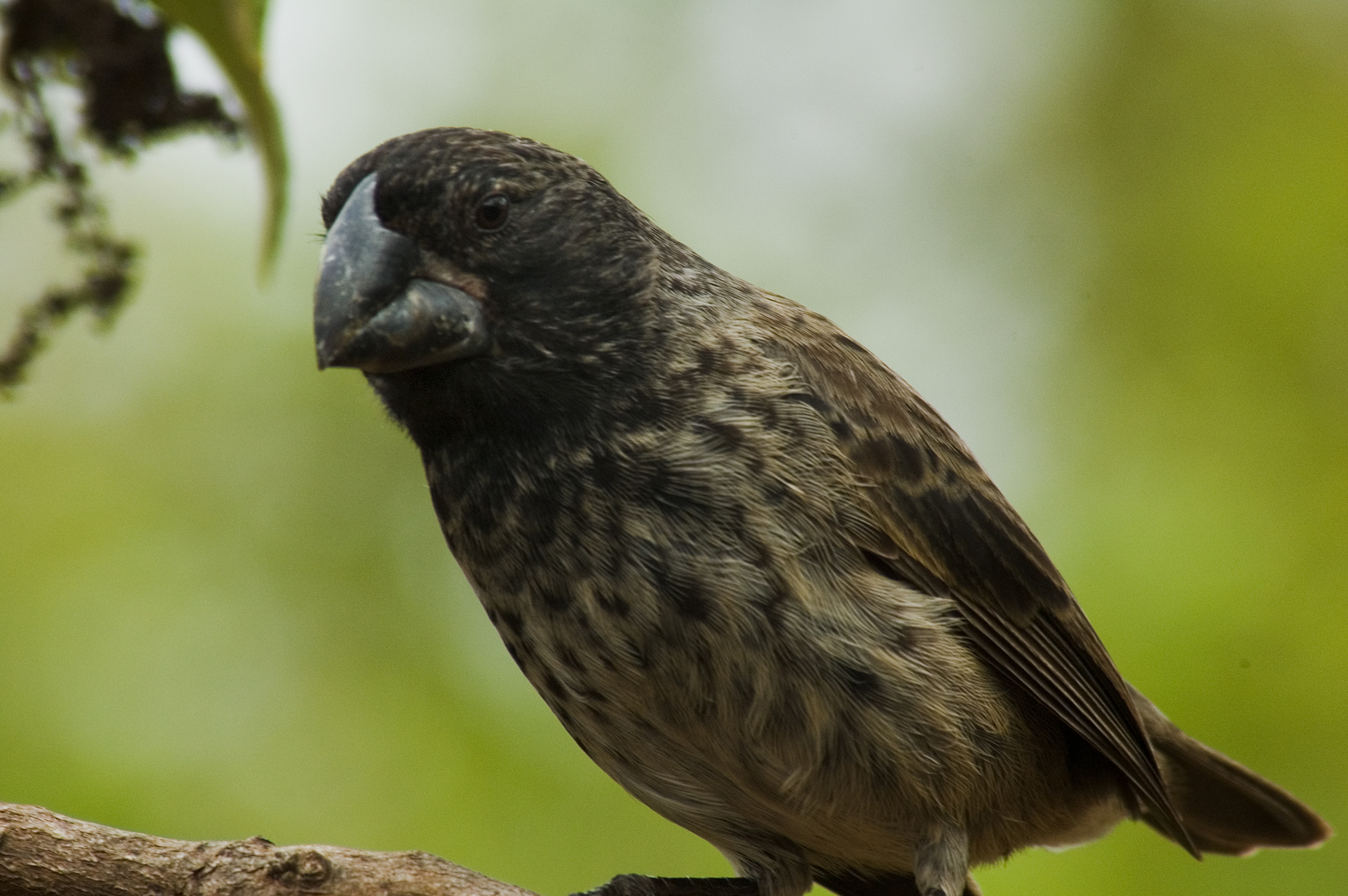

Conservation status
- Least Concern (IUCN 3.1)

Scientific classification
- Kingdom: Animalia
- Phylum: Chordata
- Class: Aves
- Order: Passeriformes
- Family: Thraupidae
- Genus: Geospiza
- Species: G. magnirostris

Binomial name
- Geospiza magnirostris Gould, 1837

= Large ground finch =

Species of bird

The large ground finch (Geospiza magnirostris) is a species of bird in the genus Geospiza. One of Darwin's finches, it is now placed in the tanager family Thraupidae and was formerly in the Emberizidae. It is the largest species of Darwin's finch.

== Description ==
The large ground finch weighs about 27–39 g (0.95–1.38 oz), and its length ranges slightly 15–16 cm (5.9–6.3 in). It is the largest species of Darwin's finch both in total size and size of beak.

The feather and bill colors vary between males and females. The adult male is mostly black, with slightly browner wings and tail; the cloaca is white-streaked; the eyes are dark brown. It also has blackish legs. The tail is relatively short. An adult female has browner feathers compared to a male, sometimes with yellow-brown or grey outer edges; scaled patterns are found going up the body; most parts of the torso and the head are streaked with brown and pale yellow shades.

=== Beak ===
It has a large beak, having a thick base of lower mandibles and curved culmen. It allows the bird to feed on large seeds and insects, but also to crack and consume nuts. Thanks to its versatile beak, the large ground finch often has a variety of food supplies. Moreover, the shape of the bill gives the finch slower and lower-pitched sounds and more nasal calls. Similar to other male finches, the beak changes color in relation to different periods: it is black during the breeding season, but turns amber outside the period.

== Habitat and distribution ==
It is endemic to the Galapagos Islands, and is found in the arid zone of most of the archipelago, though it is absent from the southeastern islands (Floreana, Española, San Cristóbal, and Santa Fé).

== Behaviour ==
They keep a small territory and build nests within. Competition for food is intense during the breeding season.

=== Feeding ===
The large ground finches have diverse food options. They eat mainly large seeds, and also pick Opuntia cactus fruits, caterpillars, and large insects. They usually feed on seeds of Tribulus cistoides and, less commonly, on seeds of Bursera graveolens. They search for food most of the time on the ground. The adults feed their chicks mainly with insects.

=== Nesting and breeding ===
Normally, the shape of their nests is round with a lateral entrance, and they are built in cacti or in bushes 3–9 m (9.8–29.5 ft) above the ground. The nest is made of twigs, dry grasses, and lichens.

Usually, before displaying in front of a female, the male builds several nests. Once the male forms a pair, the female often occupies herself by building another nest or by completing one initiated by the male. Large ground finches usually stay within the vicinity of their nests if foraging is necessary.

The breeding season starts shortly after the first rains and egg laying occurs mostly during high rainfall periods. The female finch lays four eggs and the hatching occurs in about 12 days.

=== Vocal sounds ===
The large ground finch's voice differ from other finches due to the shape and structure of its bill. Normally, the male sings only one song type, a nasal repetition consisting of 2–3 notes. The call is higher-pitched, resembling the sound "tzeeeeppp".

== Status ==
The large ground finch is widespread in its area. Although the species is extinct on Floreana Island, the population appears to be stable. The species currently is not threatened.

== Gallery ==
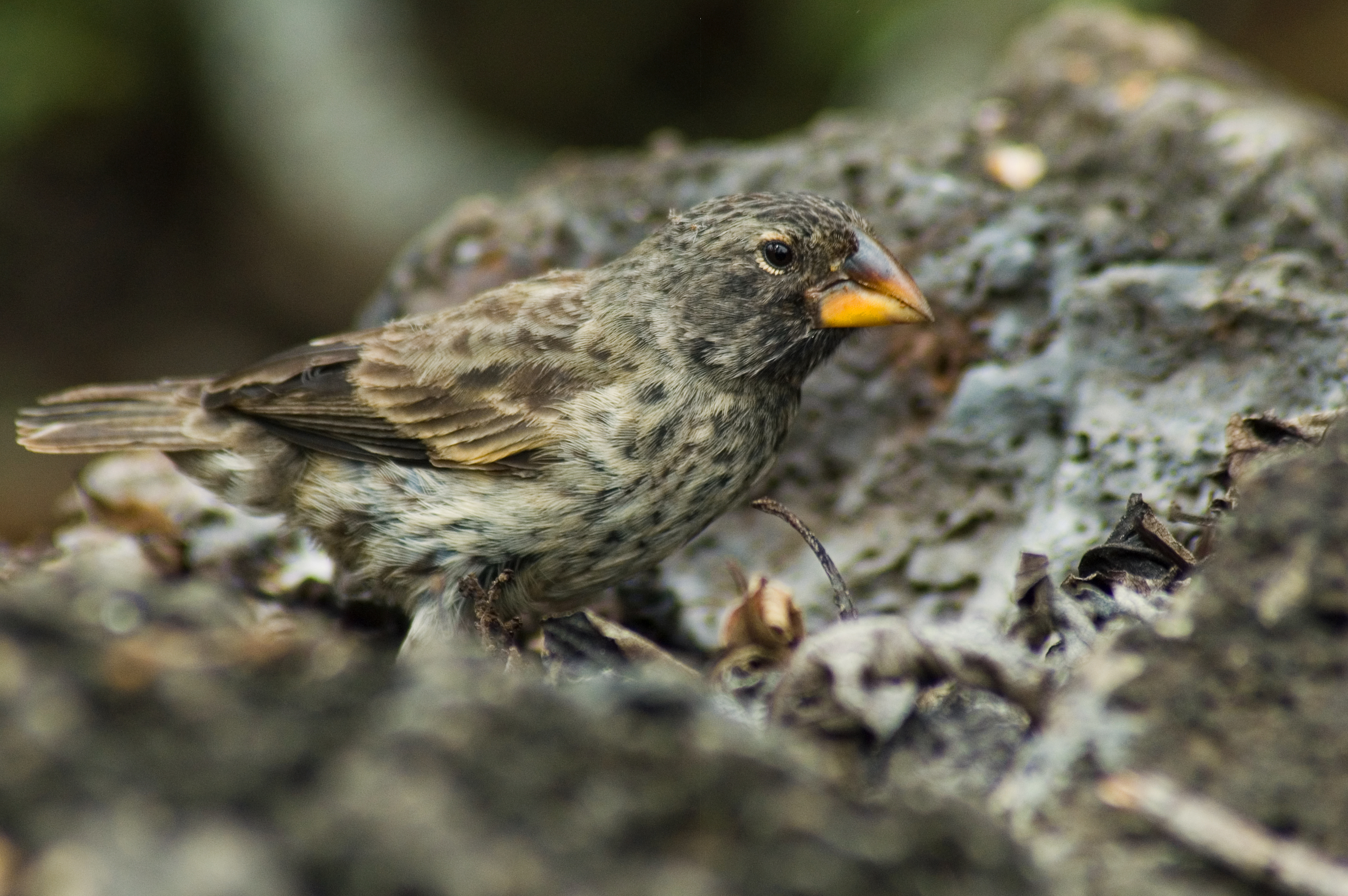
Large ground finch

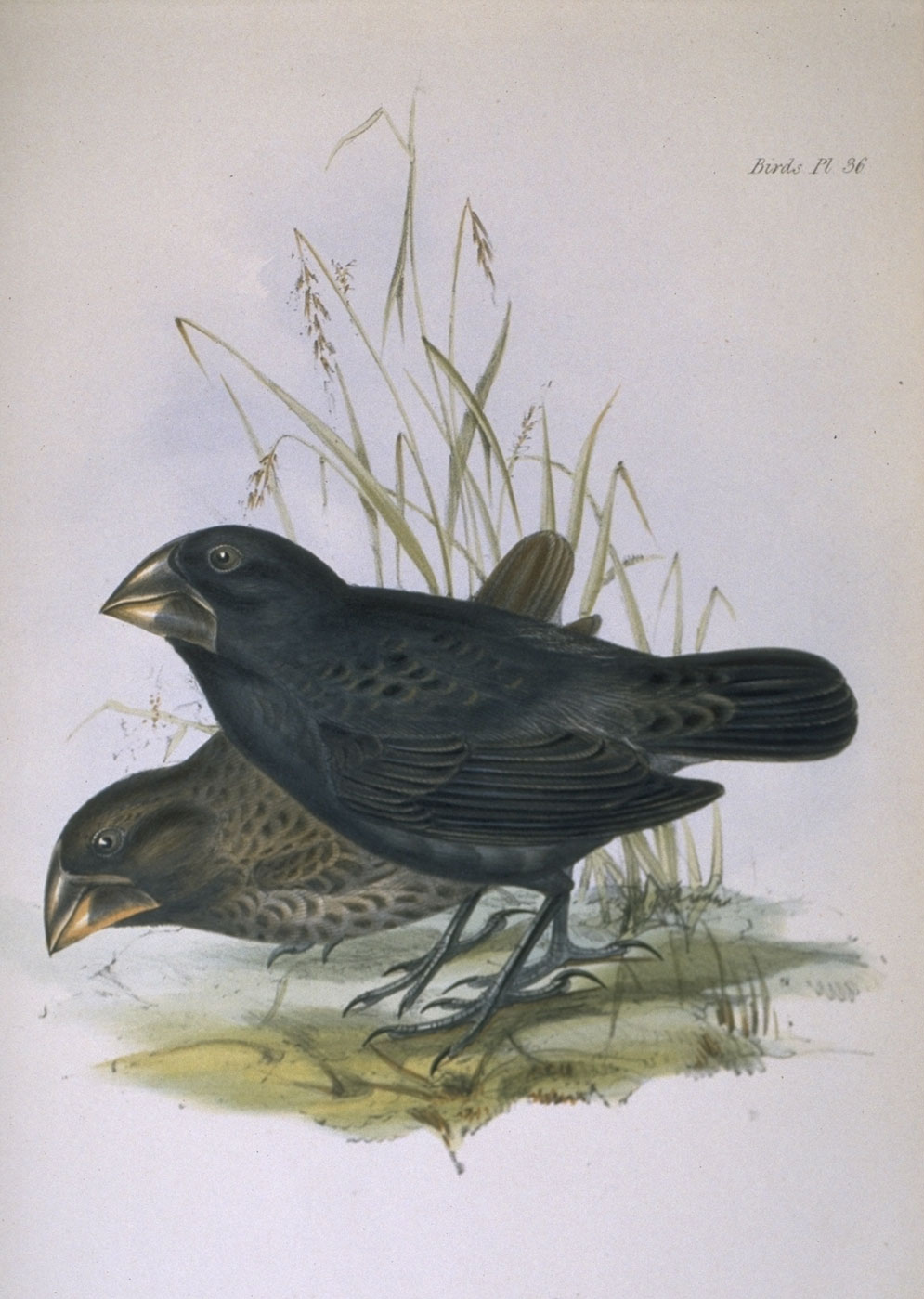
One of Darwin's finches. Charles and Chatham Islands, Galapagos Archipelago.

== Links ==
Media related to Geospiza magnirostris at Wikimedia Commons

https://www.oiseaux-birds.com/card-large-ground-finch.html
