= Genovesa Island =

Volcanic island in the Galápagos archipelago

Genovesá Island (Tower Island)
- Location within Galápagos Islands

Geography
- Location: Galápagos Islands, Ecuador
- Coordinates: 0°19′00″N 89°57′00″W
- Archipelago: Galápagos Islands
- Highest elevation: 64 m (210 ft)

Administration
- Ecuador
- Province: Galápagos Province
- Canton: San Cristóbal
- Parish: Santa María

Genovesa Island (Spanish: Isla Genovesa), also known as Tower Island, is a shield volcano in the Galápagos Islands in the eastern Pacific Ocean. The island occupies about 14 km^{2} (5 sq mi), and its maximum elevation is 64 m (210 ft). The horse-shoe shaped island has a volcanic caldera whose wall has collapsed, forming the Great Darwin Bay, surrounded by cliffs. The saltwater Lake Arcturus lies in the middle, and sediment within this crater lake is less than 6,000 years old. Although no historical eruptions are known from Genovesa, there are very young lava flows on the flanks of the volcano.

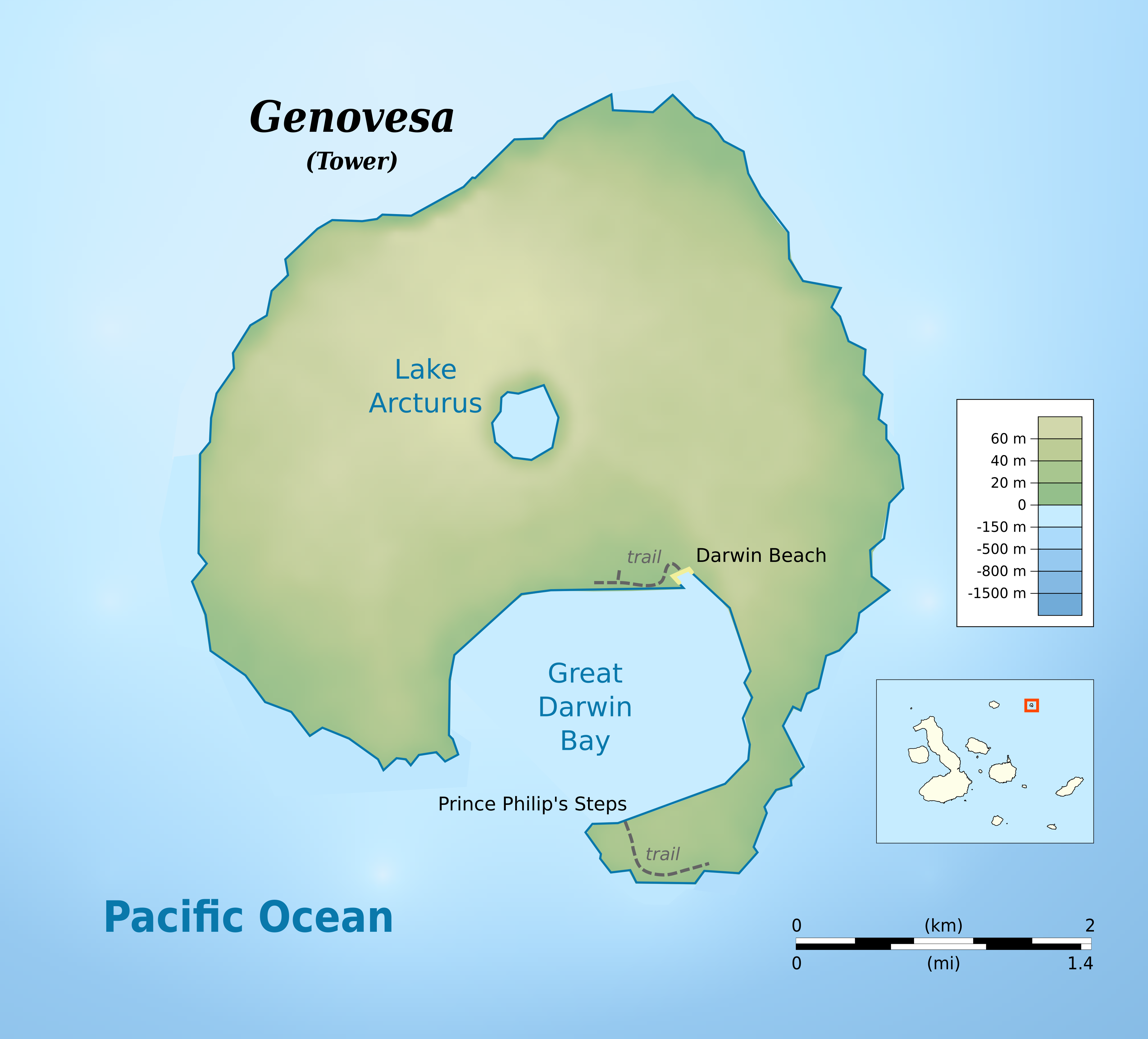
Map

== Names ==
Genovesa is Spanish for "Genovese", named after the Italian city of Genoa in honor of its native son Christopher Columbus. The name was adopted in 1892 as part of Ecuador's celebration of the quadricentennial of Columbus's first voyage. It was previously known as Quita Sueño, Spanish for "Nightmare Island".

The English pirate William Ambrosia Cowley charted it as Eures's Island in 1684, which later became Eure or Eures Island The origin of this name is uncertain, with two suggestions being William Ewres of Jamaica and Ralph Eure, 8th Baron Eure.

The name Tower Island is believed to be a corruption of Lt. John Downes, an American serving on the frigate Essex who recorded the island's position in 1813 during the War of 1812. The name Dowers's Island appeared in 1815, presumably in misspelled reference to Downes, and—after passing through Dowers's, Dowers, and Tower's—it was finally written as Tower on an Admiralty chart in 1841. (Note: The 1815 Fyffe chart... displays the first appearance of the name Dowers's for the island now known as Genovesa/Tower. This chart also identifies the present Isla Santa Cruz as Porters Isle, so it is clear that Fyffe knew of David Porter's earlier visit on the United States Frigate Essex. He therefore may have also known that Lieutenant John Downes of the Essex reported the position of this island to Captain Porter, and if so he may have assigned the Lieutenant's name (but mis-spelled as “Dowers”) to the island. The Hooker chart in the second edition of David Porter's Journal of a Cruise shows the same island but with no name assigned to it. A note on the chart states that the island is “... situated agreeably to the reports of several Whalemen, and corresponds to the position in which it was seen by Lieut. Downes.”)

The island is also sometimes known as Bird Island, from its large and varied colonies.

== Wildlife ==
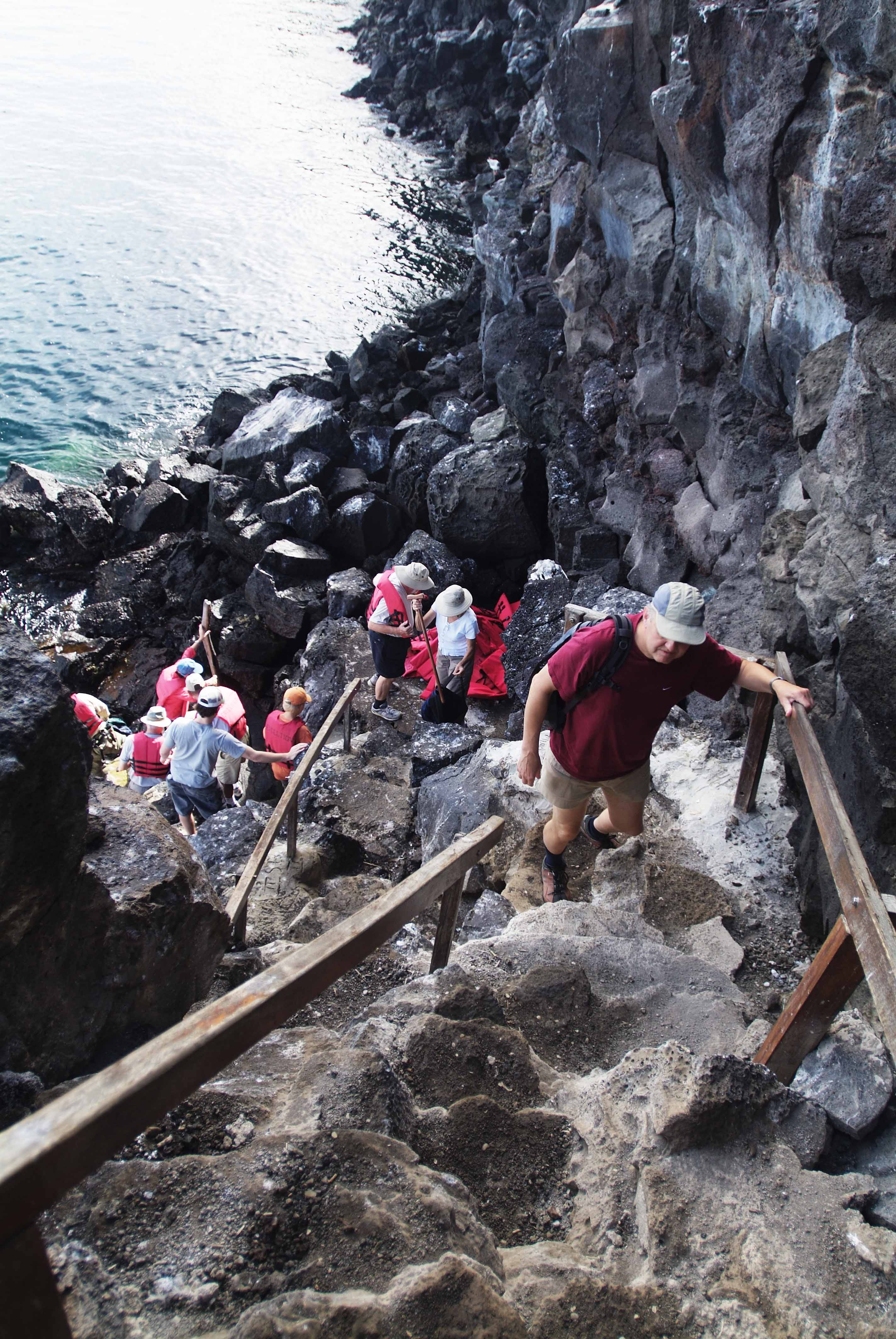
Hiking up Prince Philip's steps

There are an abundance of frigatebirds on Genovesa Island and it is among the best place in the archipelago to see red-footed boobies, Nazca boobies, swallow-tailed gulls, storm petrels, tropicbirds, Darwin's finches, and Galápagos mockingbirds.

Prince Philip's Steps is an extraordinary steep path that leads through a seabird colony full of life, up to cliffs that are 25 metres (82 feet) high. At the top, the trail continues inland, passing more seabird colonies in a thin palo santo forest. The trail also provides overviews of a rocky plain. Storm petrels here are different from any others in the world because they are active during the day. To avoid predators, they only return to their nest holes at night.

The smallest marine iguana in the archipelago lives here.

== Recreation ==
In Darwin Bay there is the possibility to either dive along the inner wall or go to the outer wall, which is less protected. Another possibility is to dive from the outside of the volcano through the channel into the caldera.

== See also ==
- List of volcanoes in Ecuador
