= List of birds of the Galápagos Islands =

This list of birds recorded in the Galápagos Islands includes species recorded in the Galápagos Islands of Ecuador, where 190 species have been documented as of March 2025. Of them, 30 are endemic (one of which is extinct), four nest only in the Galápagos, and virtually the entire population of a fifth nests there. Seventeen endemic subspecies are noted. In addition, 65 of the species are accidental and 11 were introduced to the islands, four of which are domesticated.

Unless otherwise noted, this list's taxonomic treatment (designation and sequence of orders, families and species) and nomenclature (common and scientific names) are those of the South American Classification Committee (SACC) of the American Ornithological Society.

The following tags are used to define several categories of occurrence. Untagged species are common non-endemic residents, migrants, or seasonal visitors.

- (A) Accidental - a species that rarely or accidentally occurs in the Galápagos
- (E) Endemic - a species found only the Galápagos
- (EB) Endemic breeder - a species which nests only in the Galápagos but is found elsewhere in the non-breeding season
- (ES) Endemic subspecies - a subspecies found only in the Galápagos
- (I) Introduced - a species introduced to the Galápagos as a consequence, direct or indirect, of human actions
- (D) Domesticated - a species which is domesticated in the Galápagos but not naturalised

== Ducks ==
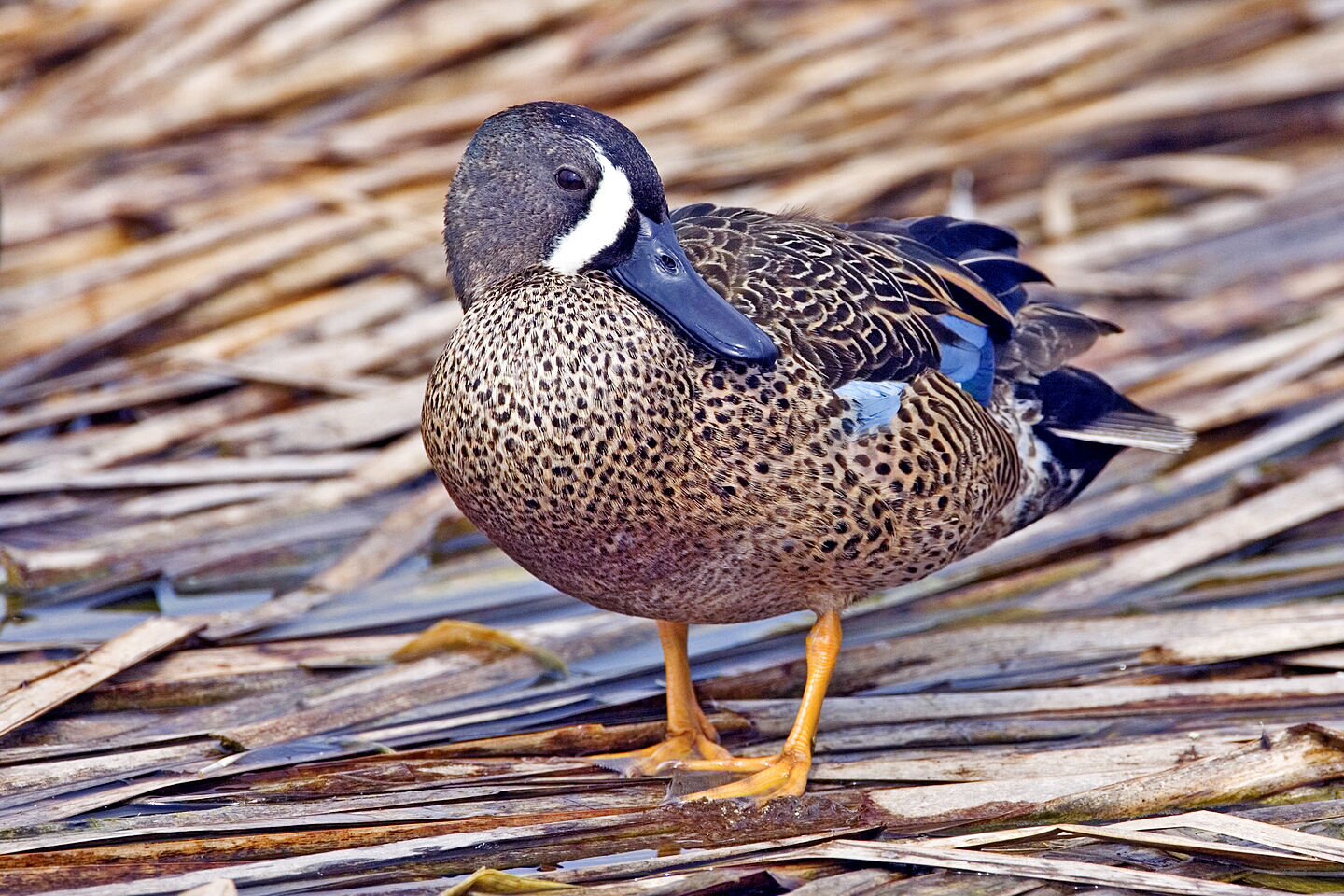
Blue-winged teal

Order: Anseriformes Family: Anatidae

These are adapted to an aquatic life, possessing webbed feet, an oily covering on their feathers to shed water, and bills adapted to their feeding needs.

- Black-bellied whistling duck, Dendrocygna autumnalis (A)
- Graylag goose, Anser anser domesticus (D)
- Northern shoveler, Spatula clypeata
- Blue-winged teal, Spatula discors
- Cinnamon teal, Spatula cyanoptera
- White-cheeked pintail, Anas bahamensis galapagensis (ES)
- Domestic mallard, Anas platyrhynchos domesticus (D) (Note: This species is not on the SACC list. Its placement follows Clements.)
- Masked duck, Nomonyx dominicus (A)

== Guineafowl ==
Order: Galliformes Family: Numididae

Guineafowl are African gamebirds, mostly spotted, with bare skin on the head and neck to lose heat.

- Helmeted guineafowl, Numida meleagris (I)

== Pheasants ==
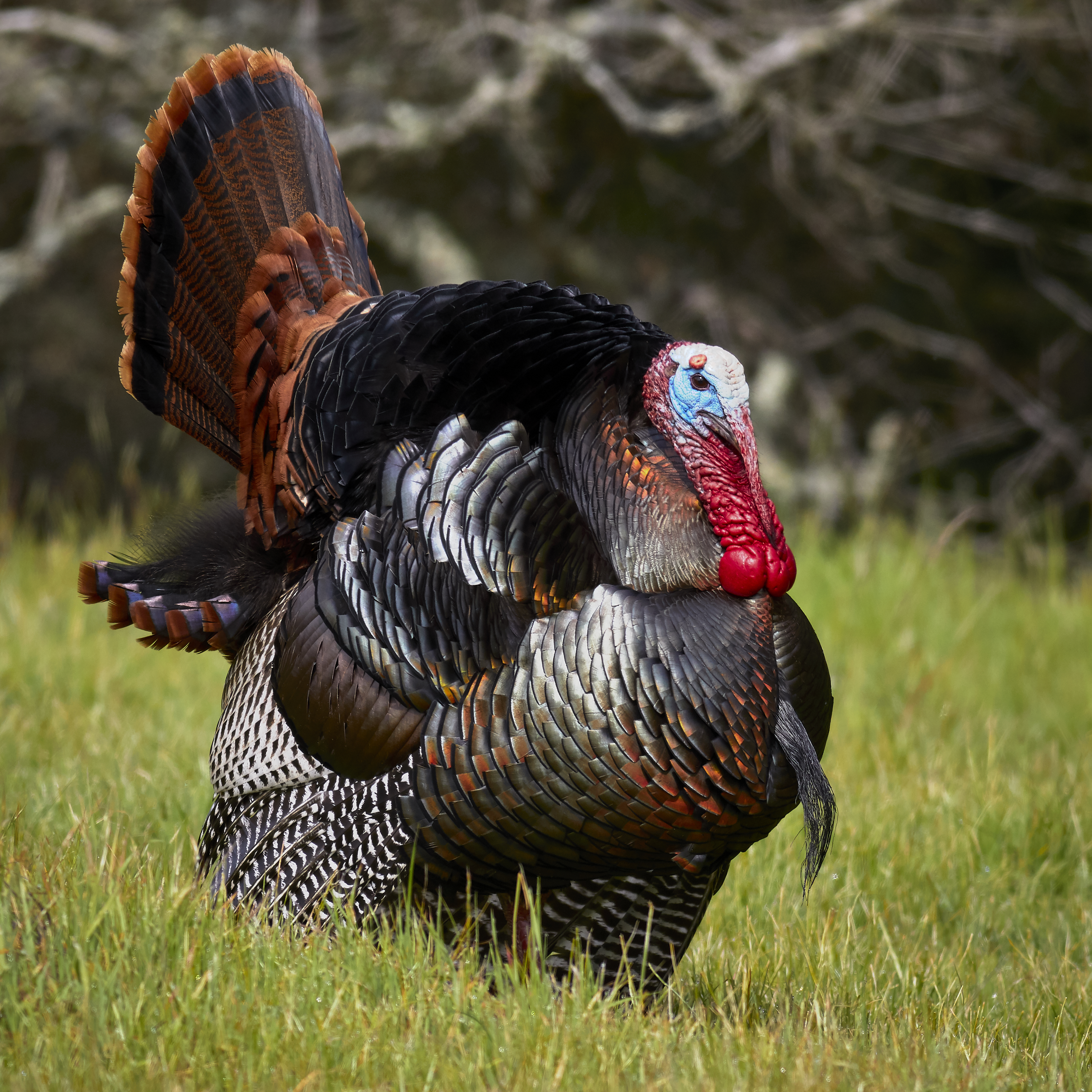
Male wild turkey

Order: Galliformes Family: Phasianidae

Phasianidae consists of the pheasants and their allies. These are terrestrial species, variable in size but generally plump with broad relatively short wings. Many species are gamebirds or have been domesticated as a food source for humans.

- Green peafowl, Pavo muticus (I)
- Common quail, Coturnix coturnix (I)
- Domestic chicken, Gallus gallus domesticus (D)
- Domestic turkey, Meleagris gallopavo (D)

== Flamingos ==
Order: Phoenicopteriformes Family: Phoenicopteridae

Flamingos are water birds with a downcurved beak for sieving food.

- Chilean flamingo, Phoenicopterus chilensis (A)
- American flamingo, Phoenicopterus ruber

== Grebes ==
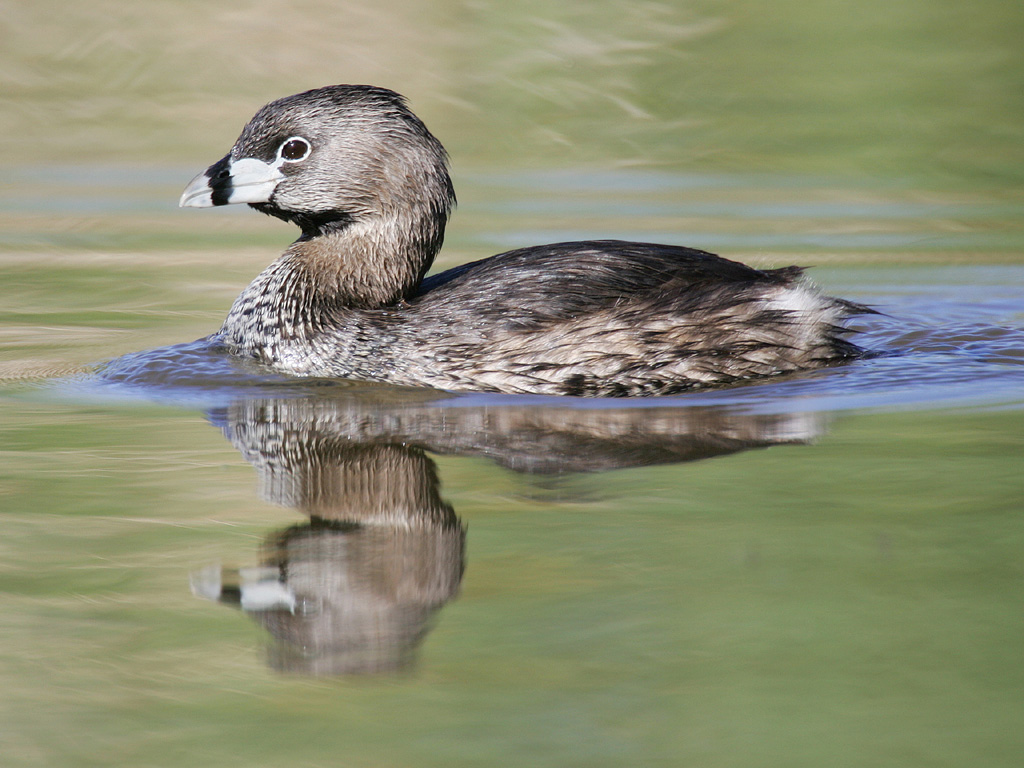
Pied-billed grebe

Order: Podicipediformes Family: Podicipedidae

Grebes are aquatic birds most closely related to flamingoes. They are well adapted to living in water but are clumsy on land, never straying far from water when they build their nests.

- Pied-billed grebe, Podilymbus podiceps

== Pigeons ==
Order: Columbiformes Family: Columbidae

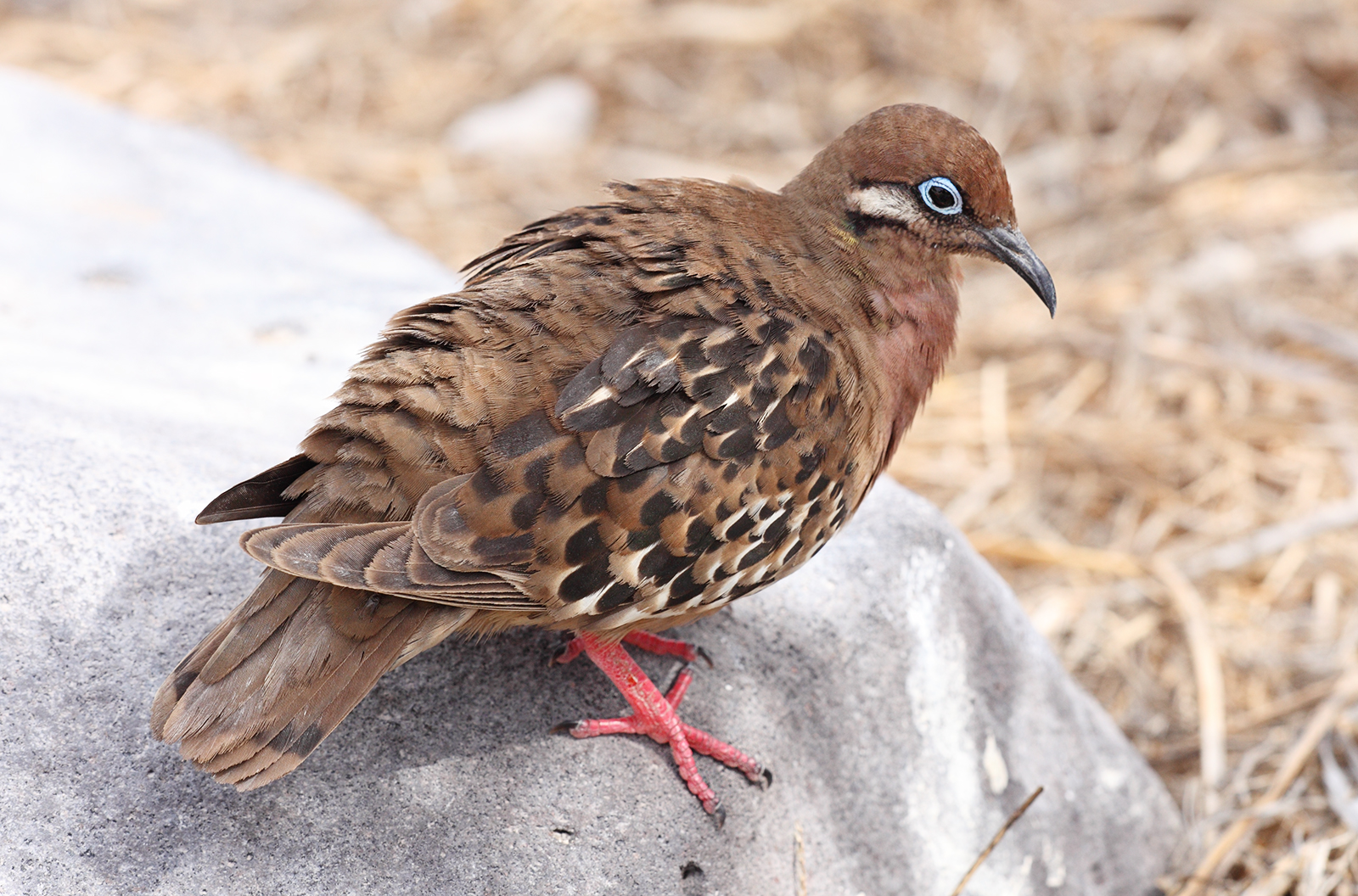
Galapagos dove

Pigeons and doves are medium to large mostly plump birds. Most are arboreal species descending to the ground to feed but some are terrestrial like the quail-doves of South America or the pheasant-pigeon of New Guinea. They are found worldwide except near the poles and in a wide variety of habitats including urban. The feral form of the rock pigeon has been introduced worldwide.

- Rock pigeon, Columba livia (Ex)
- Galapagos dove, Zenaida galapagoensis (E)
- Eared dove, Zenaida auriculata (A)

== Cuckoos ==
Order: Cuculiformes Family: Cuculidae

Cuckoos are found almost worldwide. They are highly variable in size, shape, colour, and habits.

- Smooth-billed ani, Crotophaga ani (I)
- Dark-billed cuckoo, Coccyzus melacoryphus
- Black-billed cuckoo, Coccyzus erythropthalmus (A)
- Gray-capped cuckoo, Coccyzus lansbergi

== Nightjars ==
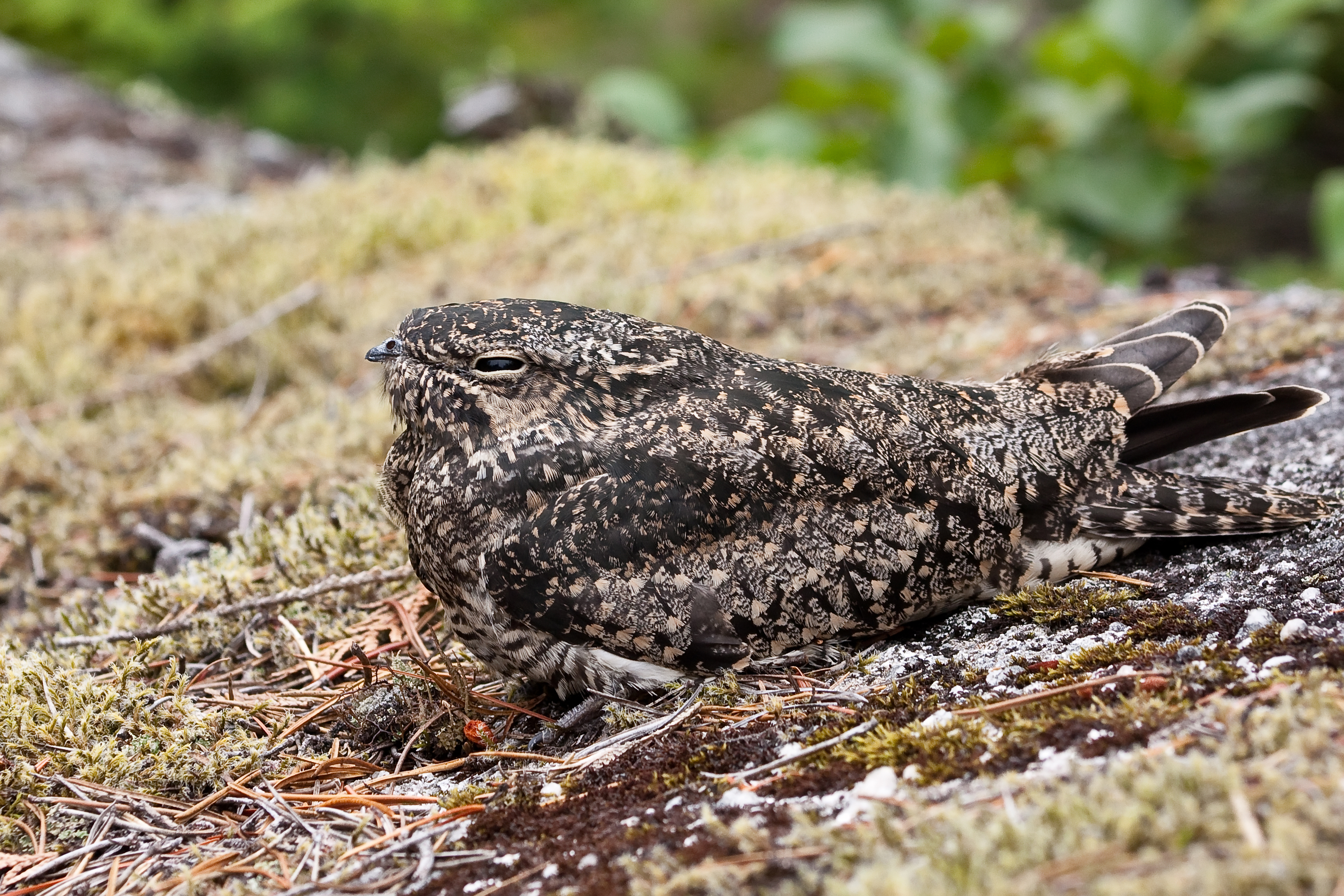
Common nighthawk

Order: Caprimulgiformes Family: Caprimulgidae

Nighthawks belong to the same family as nightjars but are found only in the Americas. They have mottled or striped plumage for camouflage.

- Common nighthawk, Chordeiles minor

== Swifts ==
Order: Apodiformes Family: Apodidae

Swifts are aerodynamic species which are found worldwide. Some species are migratory, others resident, and others still have both migratory and resident populations.

- Chimney swift, Chaetura pelagica (A)

== Rails ==
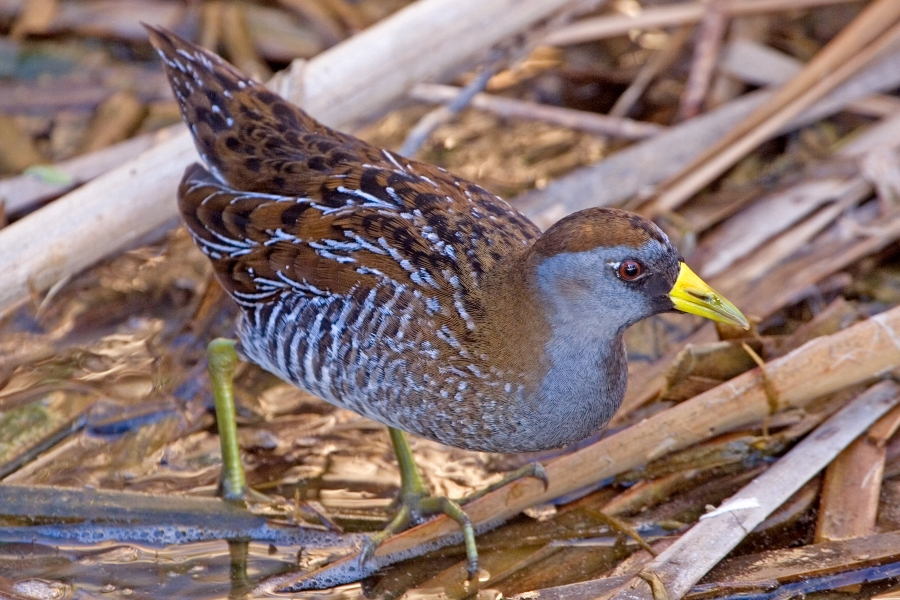
Sora

Order: Gruiformes Family: Rallidae

Rails are usually secretive birds. Many island species are flightless and many of those have gone extinct in the last five centuries. Gallinules are less secretive, and are usually found near or on water.

- Purple gallinule, Porphyrio martinica
- Galapagos rail, Laterallus spilonota (E)
- Paint-billed crake, Mustelirallus erythrops
- Sora, Porzana carolina (A)
- Common gallinule, Gallinula galeata
- American coot, Fulica americana (A)

== Plovers ==
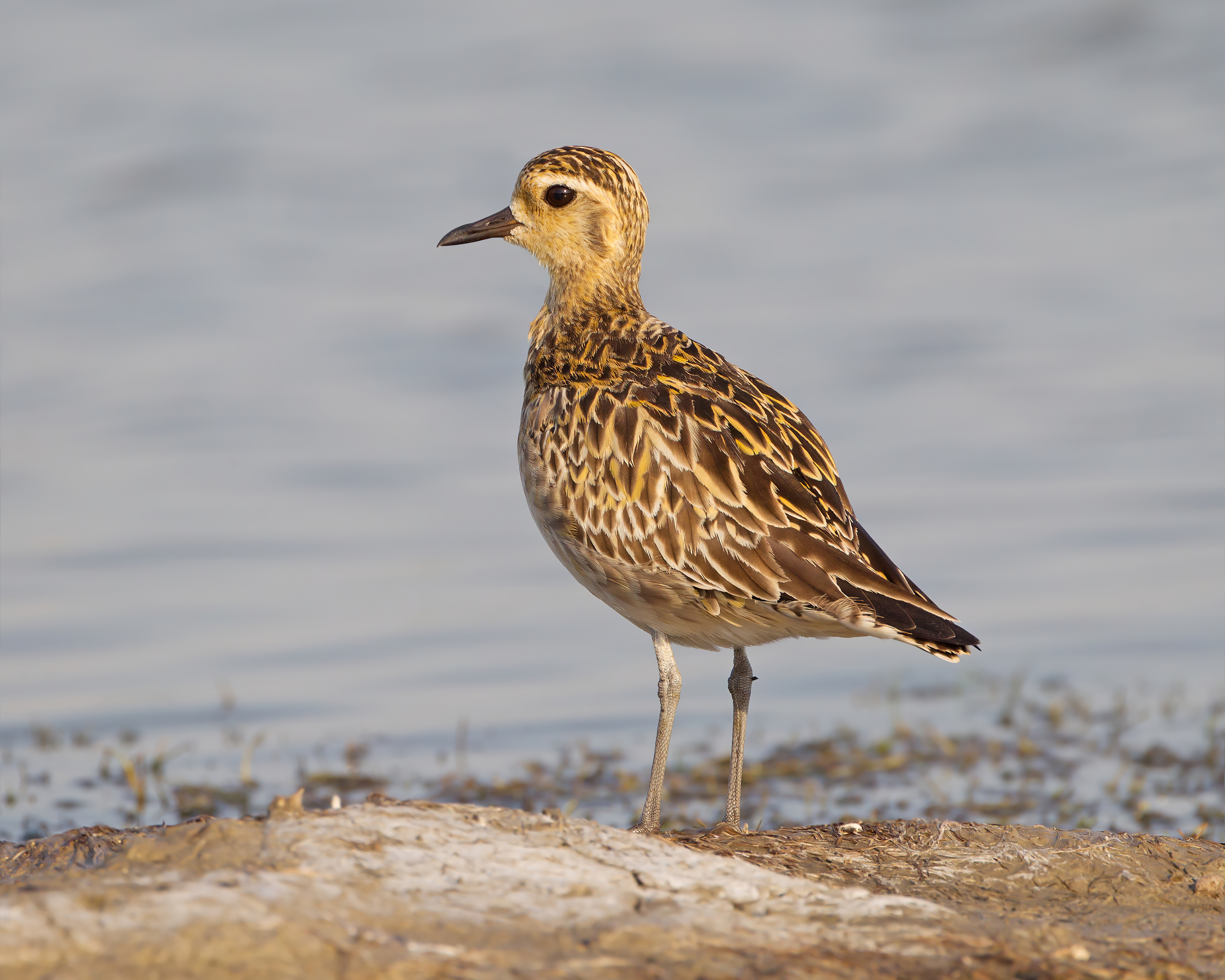
Pacific golden plover

Order: Charadriiformes Family: Charadriidae

Plovers are dull-coloured shorebirds without many distinguishing features. The bill is short and straight to catch worms on the surface. Lapwings are slightly bigger and more colourful shorebirds. Their legs are longer than plover's but the bill is the same size with respect to the body.

- Black-bellied plover, Pluvialis squatarola
- American golden-plover, Pluvialis dominica
- Pacific golden-plover, Pluvialis fulva
- Tawny-throated dotterel, Oreopholus ruficollis (A)
- Killdeer, Charadrius vociferus (A)
- Semipalmated plover, Charadrius semipalmatus
- Wilson's plover, Anarynchus wilsonia (A)

== Oystercatchers ==
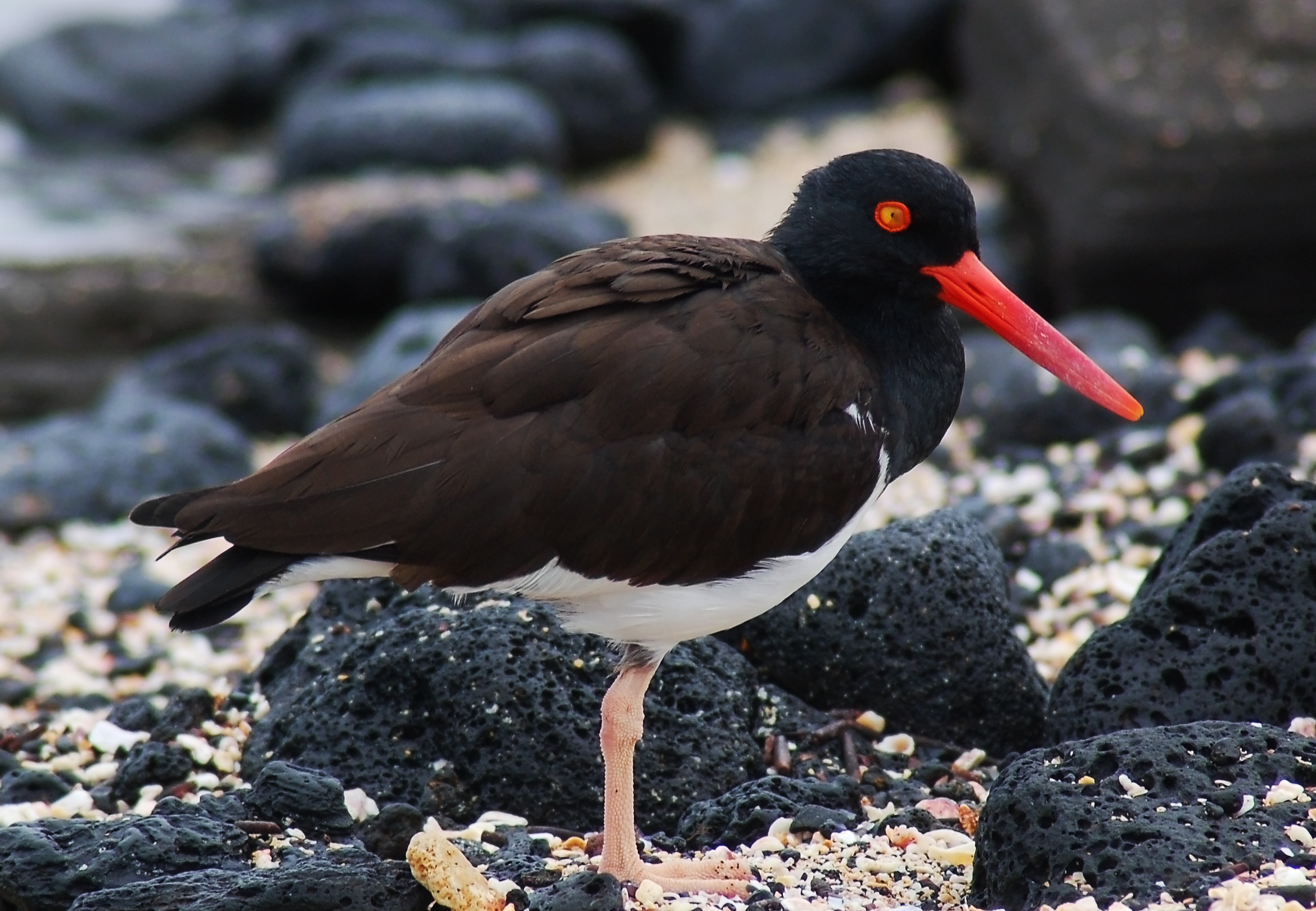
American oystercatcher

Order: Charadriiformes Family: Haematopodidae

Oystercatchers are black or black and white shorebirds with long orange bills and with or without an eyering. The legs are pinkish.

- American oystercatcher, Haematopus palliatus galapagensis (ES)

== Avocets and stilts ==
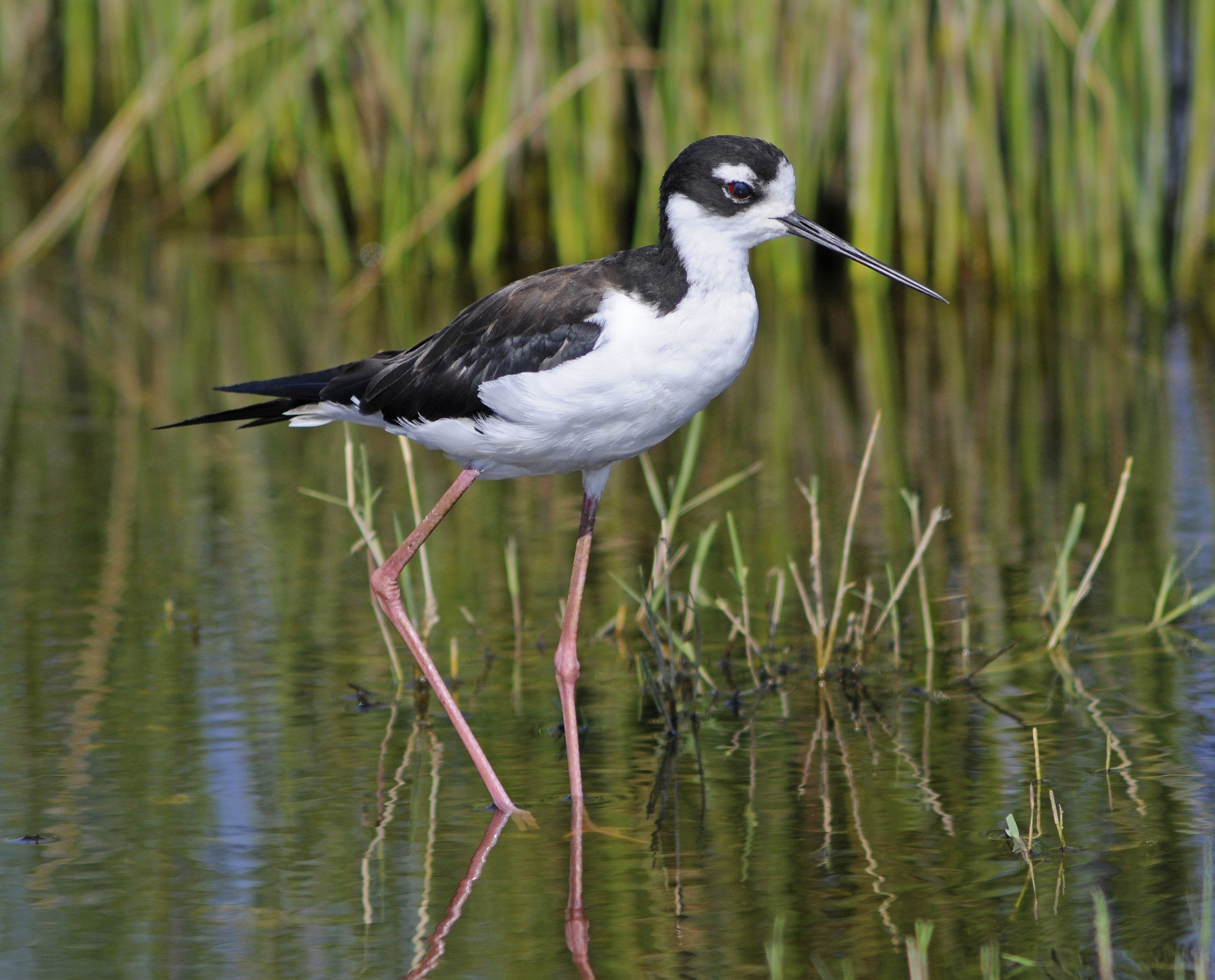
Black-necked stilt

Order: Charadriiformes Family: Recurvirostridae

Stilts are spindly legged birds with black and white markings.

- Black-necked stilt, Himantopus mexicanus

== Sandpipers ==
Order: Charadriiformes Family: Scolopacidae

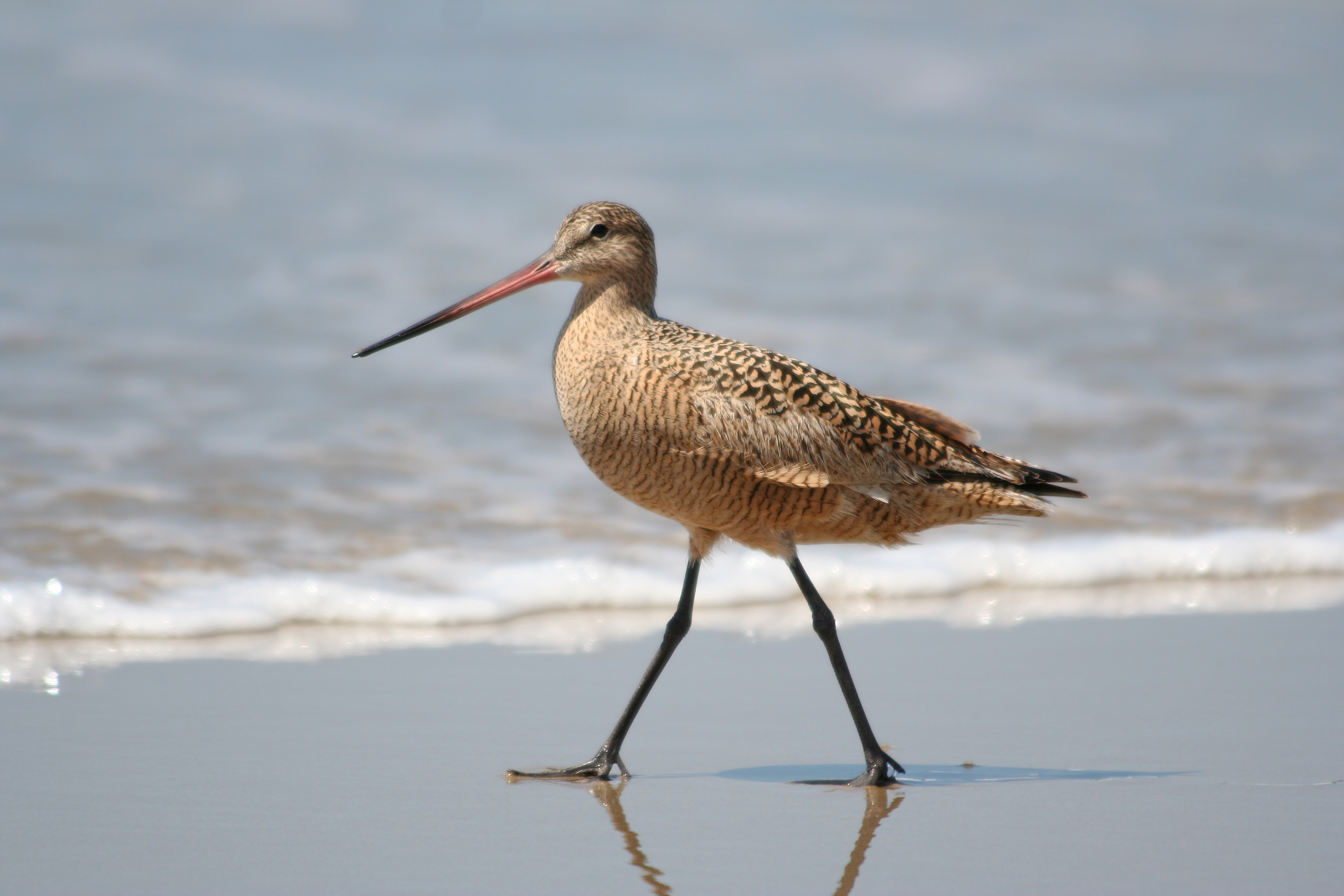
Marbled godwit

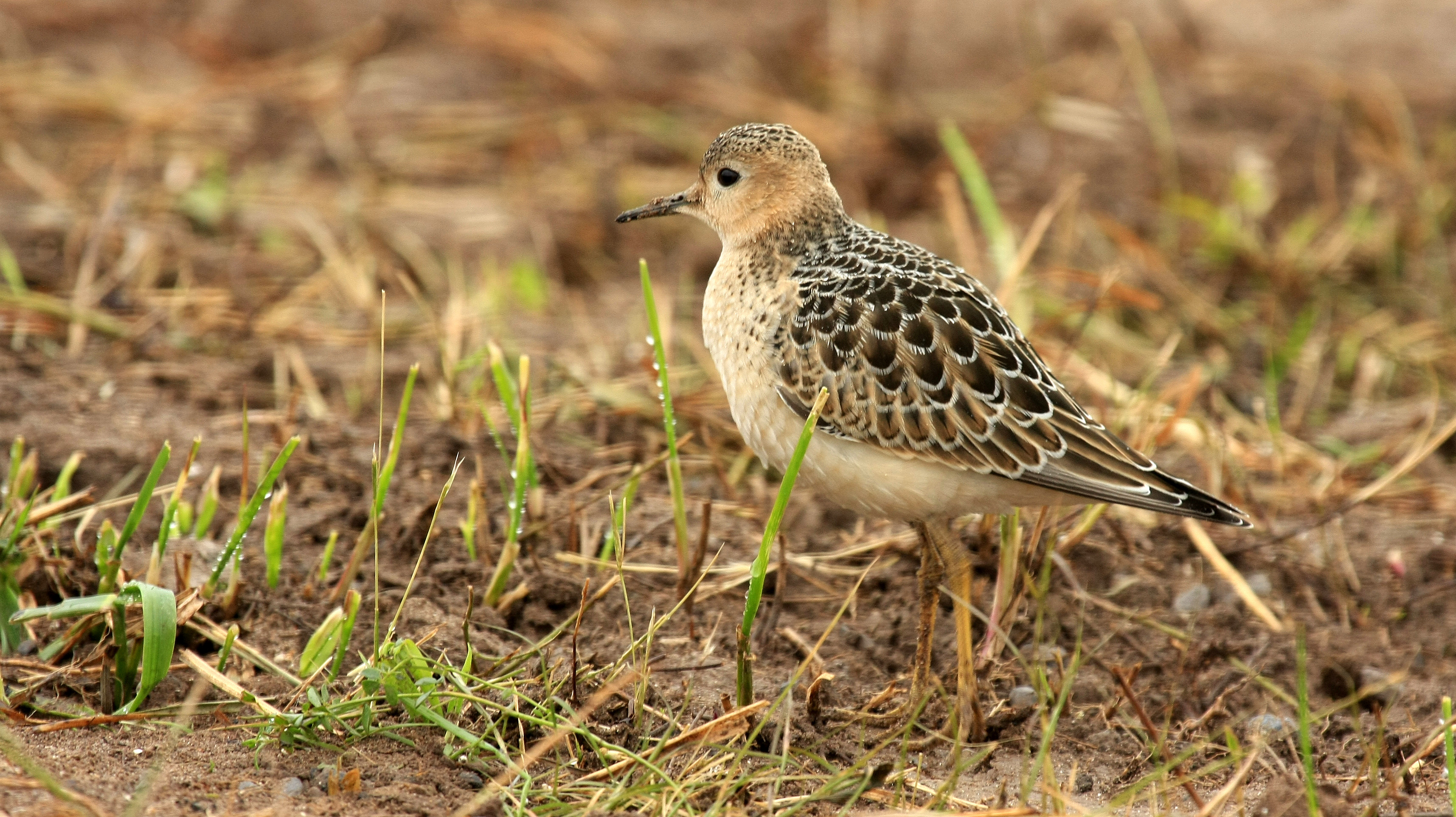
Buff-breasted sandpiper

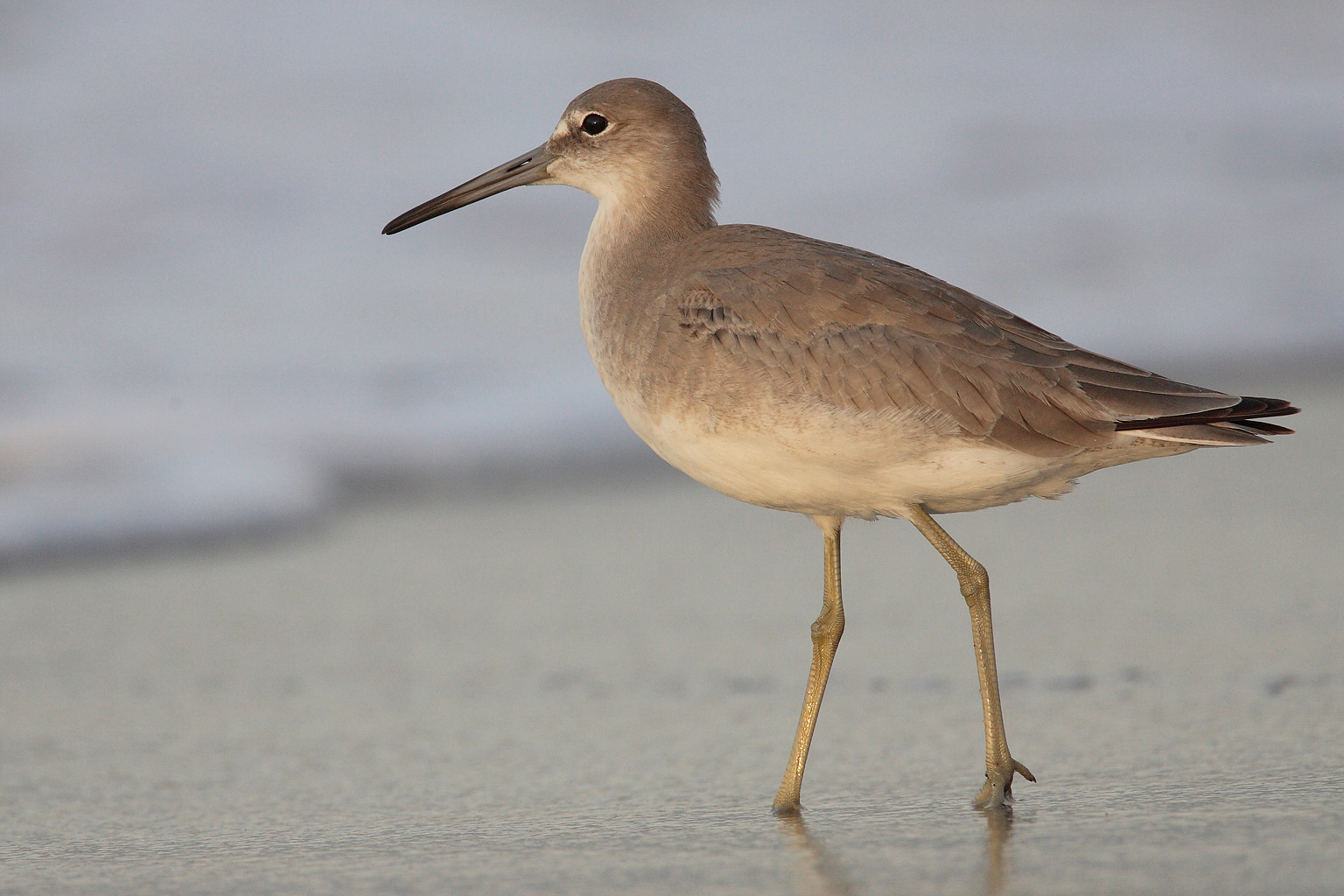
Willet

Sandpipers are long-legged mostly long-billed shorebirds. Some like woodcocks and snipes are forest species but most others are estuarine or wetland species.

- Whimbrel Numenius phaeopus
- Hudsonian godwit Limosa haemastica (A)
- Marbled godwit Limosa fedoa (A)
- Ruddy turnstone Arenaria interpres
- Black turnstone Arenaria melanocephala
- Red knot Calidris canutus (A)
- Surfbird Calidris virgata (A)
- Stilt sandpiper Calidris himantopus (A)
- Sanderling Calidris alba
- Baird's sandpiper Calidris bairdii (A)
- Least sandpiper Calidris minutilla
- White-rumped sandpiper Calidris fuscicollis (A)
- Buff-breasted sandpiper, Calidris subruficollis
- Pectoral sandpiper Calidris melanotos (A)
- Semipalmated sandpiper Calidris pusilla (A)
- Western sandpiper Calidris mauri (A)
- Short-billed dowitcher Limnodromus griseus
- Wilson's phalarope Phalaropus tricolor
- Red-necked phalarope Phalaropus lobatus
- Red phalarope Phalaropus fulicarius
- Spotted sandpiper Actitis macularius
- Solitary sandpiper Tringa solitaria (A)
- Wandering tattler Tringa incana
- Greater yellowlegs Tringa melanoleuca
- Willet Tringa semipalmata
- Lesser yellowlegs Tringa flavipes

== Skuas ==
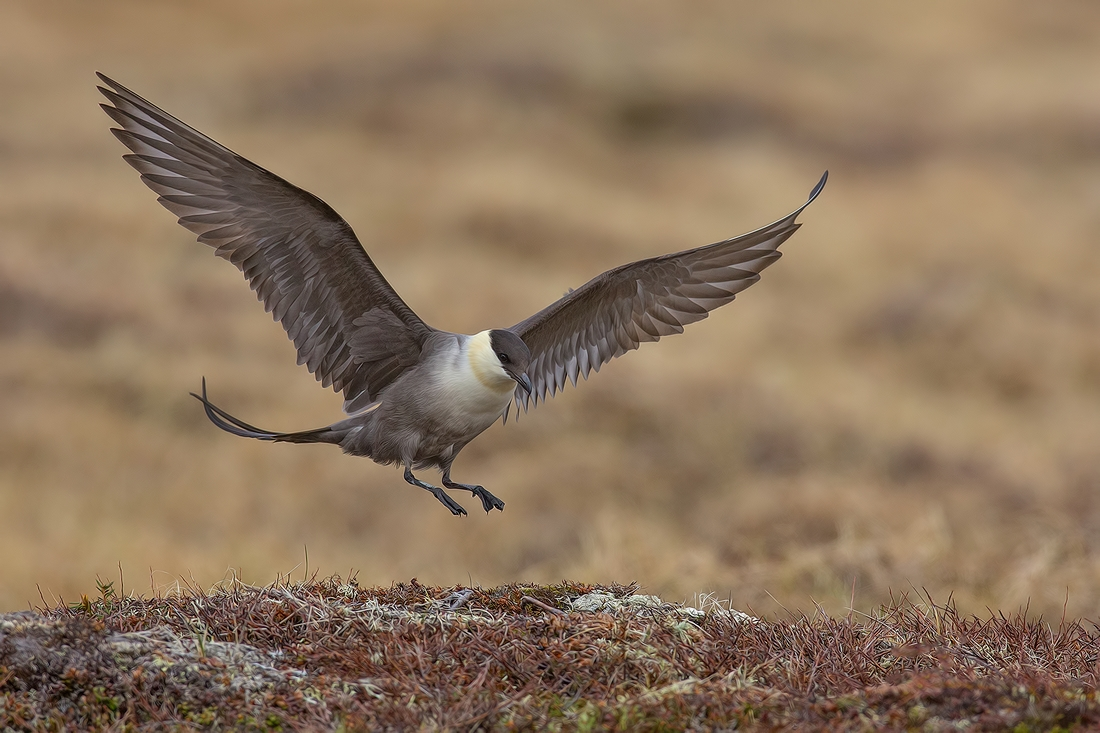
Long-tailed jaeger

Order: Charadriiformes Family: Stercorariidae

Stercorariidae are predatory birds typically separated into the bigger Catharacta skuas and the smaller Stercorarius jaegers.

- Great skua, Stercorarius skua
- Pomarine jaeger, Stercorarius pomarinus (A)
- Parasitic jaeger, Stercorarius parasiticus
- Long-tailed jaeger, Stercorarius longicaudus

== Gulls ==
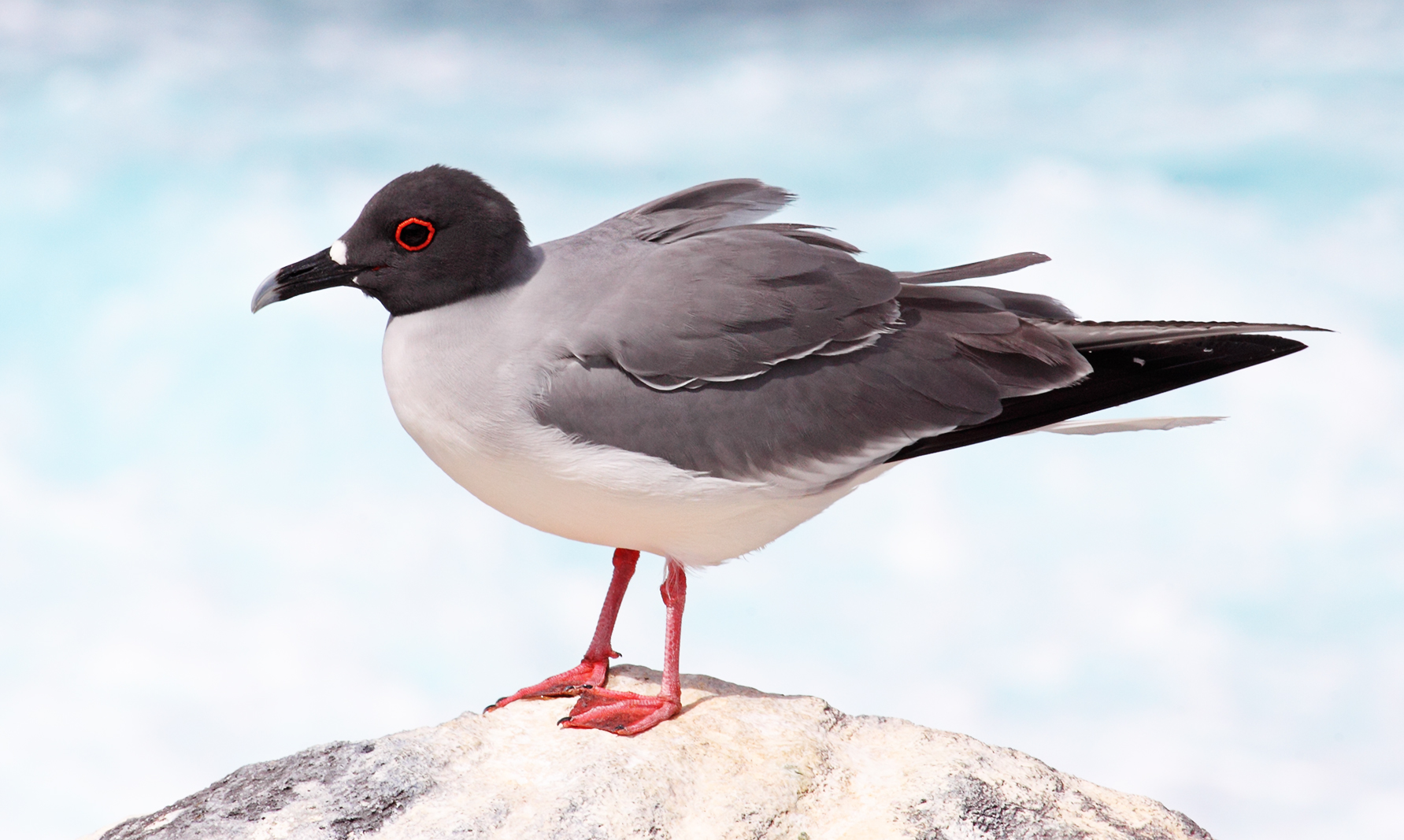
Swallow-tailed gull

Order: Charadriiformes Family: Laridae

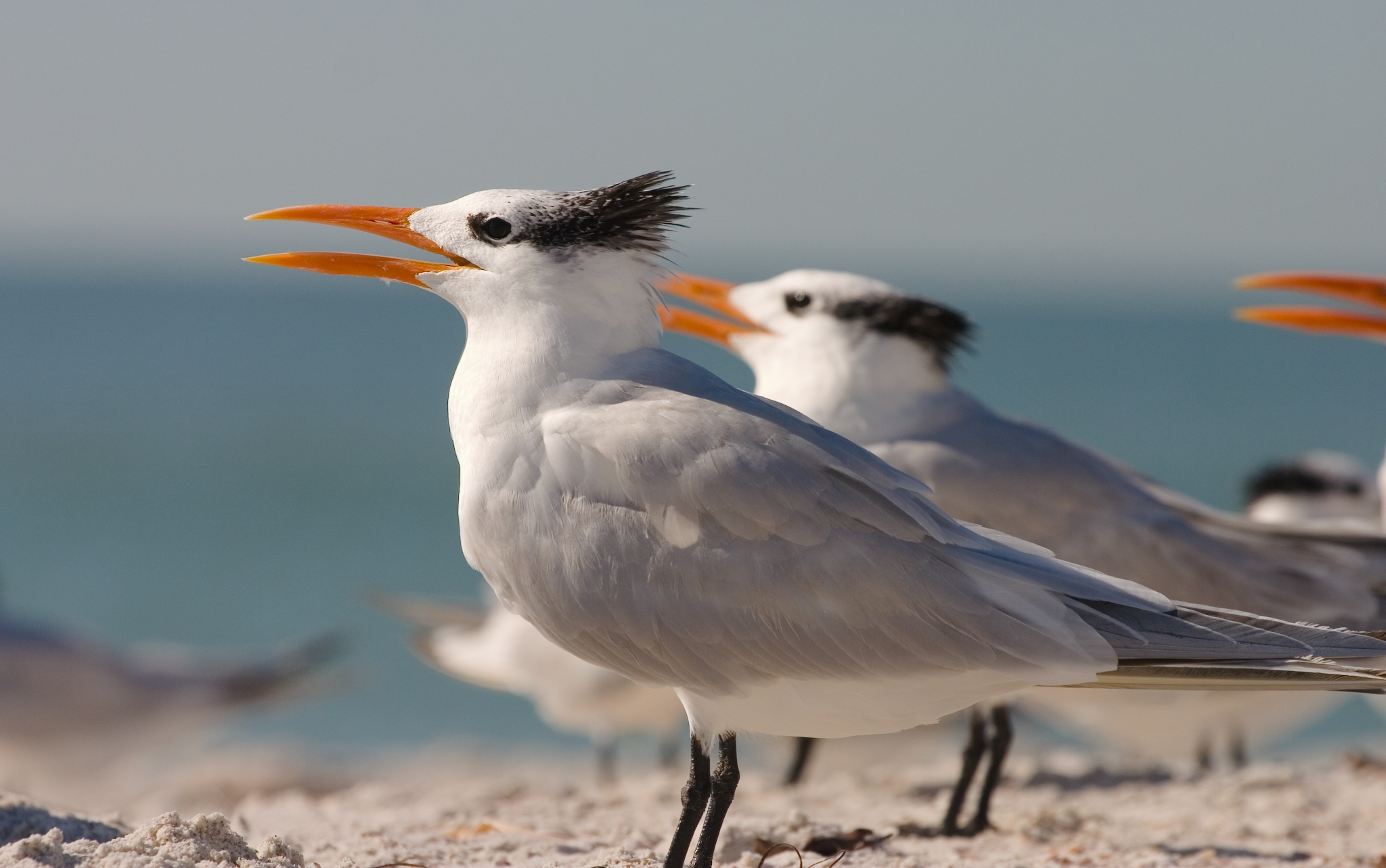
Royal tern

Gulls are seabirds although some are found on freshwater. They have hooked bills and some have hoods or caps on their heads. Terns were formerly placed in a family of their own, Sternidae, but now they are commonly placed along with gulls and skimmers in Laridae. Their bills are straighter than those of gulls.

- Swallow-tailed gull, Creagrus furcatus (essentially EB; a few pairs breed in Colombia)
- Gray-hooded gull, Chroicocephalus cirrocephalus (A)
- Laughing gull, Leucophaeus atricilla
- Franklin's gull, Leucophaeus pipixcan
- Lava gull, Leucophaeus fuliginosus (E)
- Ring-billed gull, Larus delawarensis (A)
- Kelp gull, Larus dominicanus (A)
- Brown noddy, Anous stolidus galapagensis (ES)
- White tern, Gygis alba (A)
- Sooty tern, Onychoprion fuscatus
- Inca tern, Larosterna inca (A)
- Black tern, Chlidonias niger
- Common tern, Sterna hirundo
- Elegant tern, Thalasseus elegans (A)
- Royal tern, Thalasseus maximus

== Tropicbirds ==
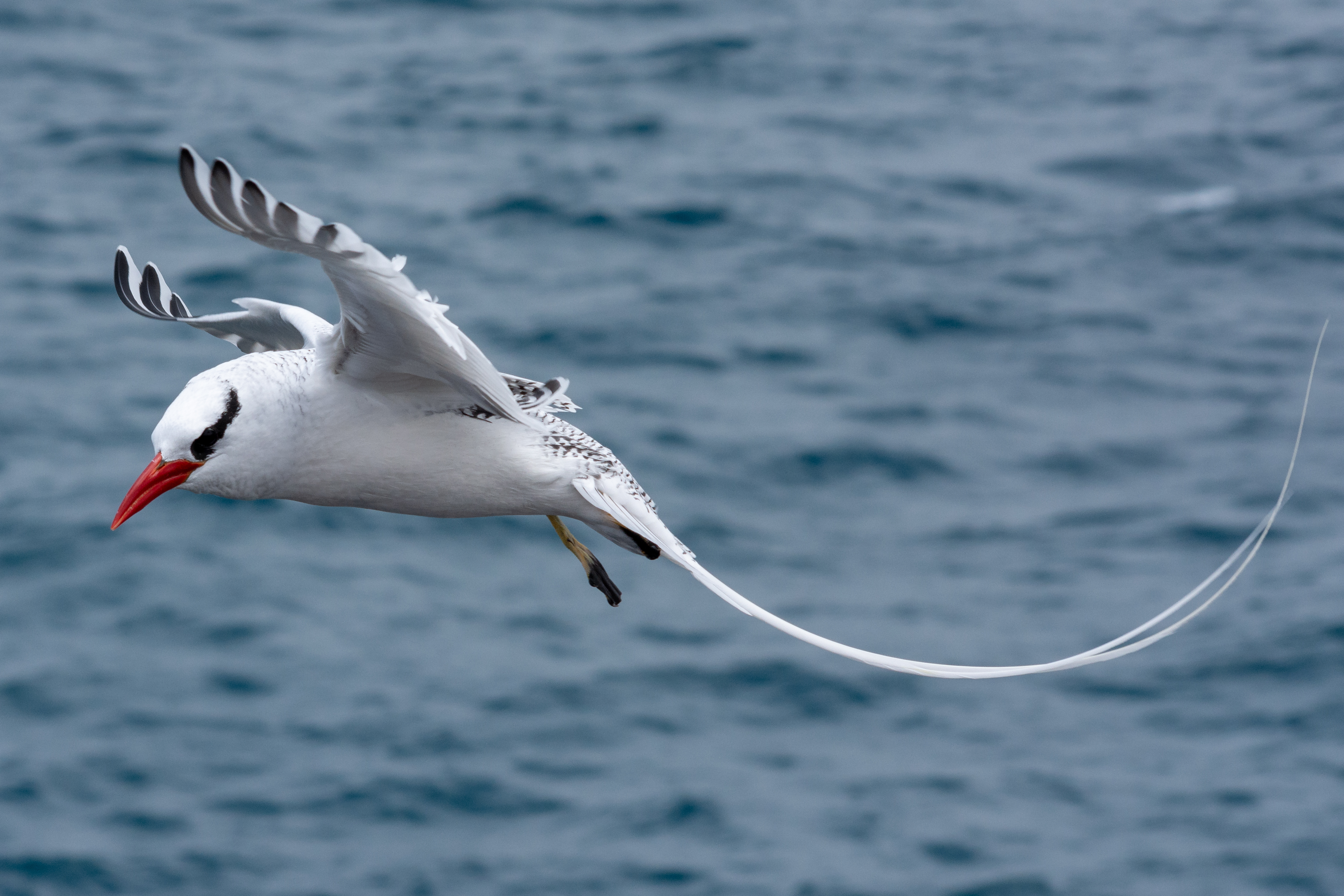
Red-billed tropicbird

Order: Phaethontiformes Family: Phaethontidae

Tropicbirds are seabirds once thought to be closely related to pelicans but are now known to belong to a clade known as Metaves.

- Red-billed tropicbird, Phaethon aethereus
- Red-tailed tropicbird, Phaethon rubricauda (A)

== Penguins ==
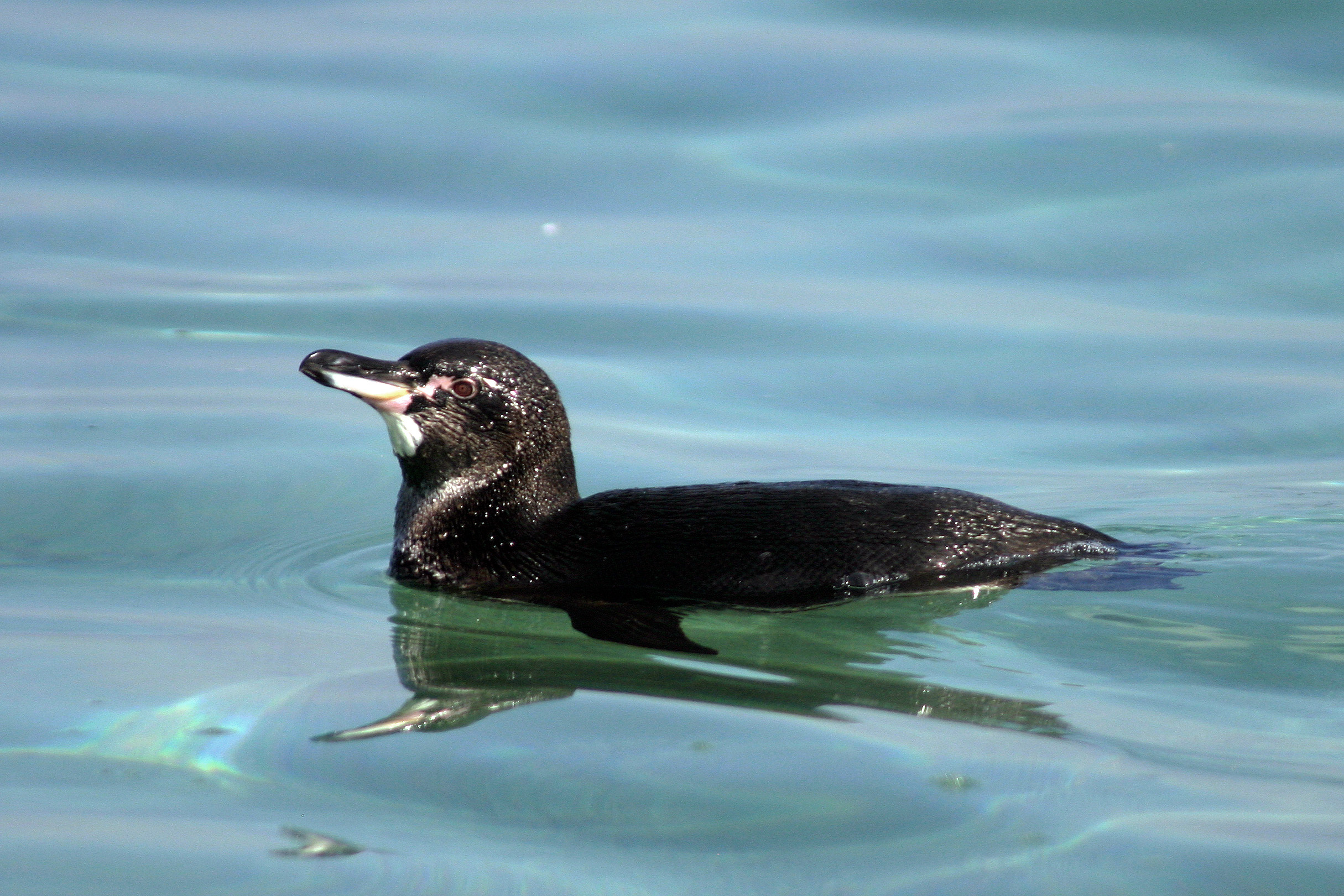
Galapagos penguin

Order: Sphenisciformes Family: Spheniscidae

Penguins are southern ocean birds with only this one species occurring north of the equator. They are small to large in size and mostly black and white in color.

- Galapagos penguin, Spheniscus mendiculus (EB)

== Albatrosses ==
Order: Procellariiformes Family: Diomedeidae

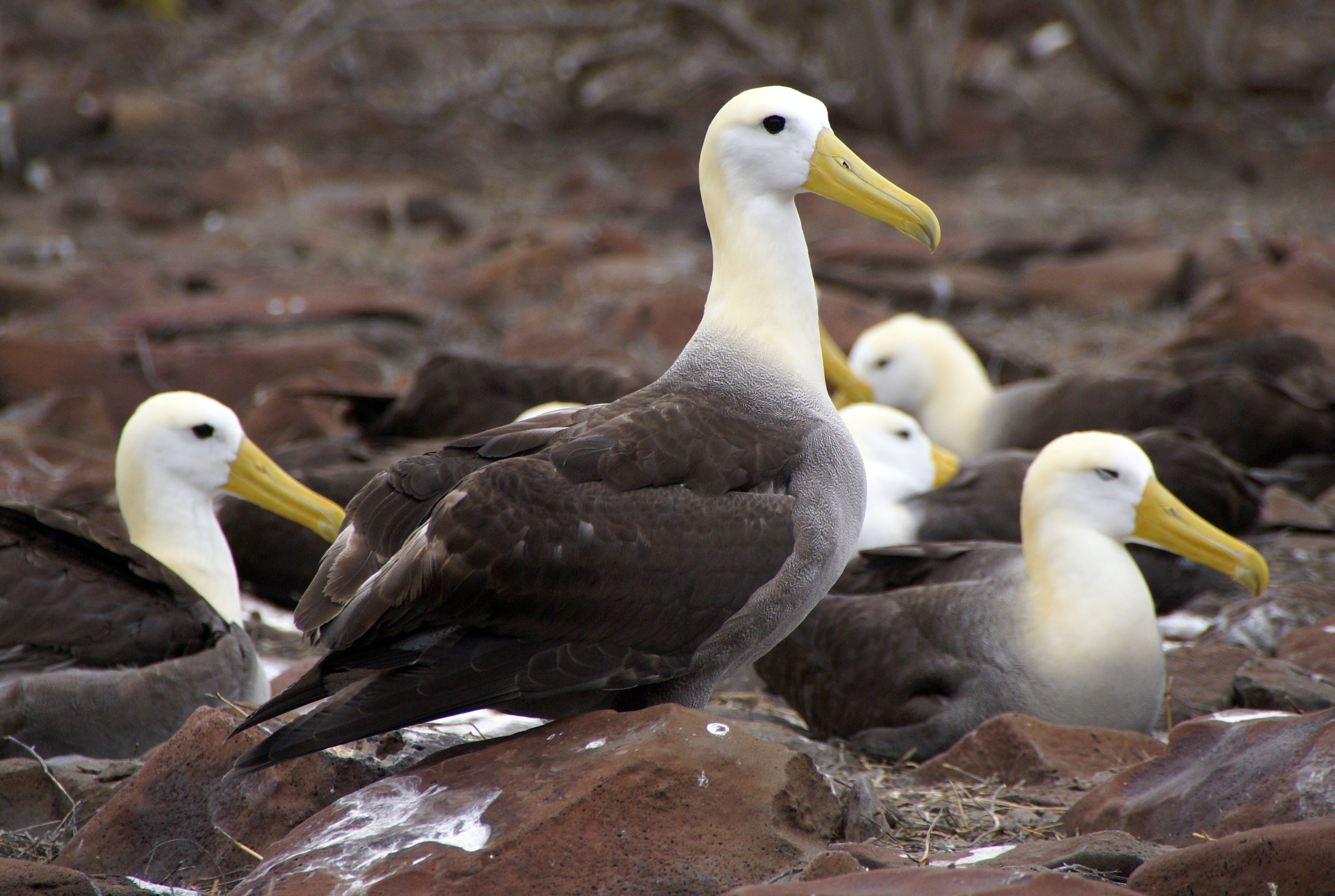
Waved albatross

Albatrosses are large tubenoses with wingspans of more than a meter. Most are southern ocean species but some are found in the northern Pacific Ocean.

- Waved albatross, Phoebastria irrorata (EB)
- Southern royal albatross, Diomedea epomophora
- Wandering albatross, Diomedea exulans
- Black-browed albatross, Thalassarche melanophris
- Black-footed albatross, Phoebastria nigripes (A)

== Southern storm-petrels ==
Order: Procellariiformes Family: Oceanitidae

Storm-petrels are small marine birds that are mostly black and white. Until 2018, this family's species were included with the other storm-petrels in family Hydrobatidae.

- White-bellied storm-petrel, Fregetta grallaria (A)
- Elliot's storm-petrel, Oceanites gracilis galapagoensis (ES)
- White-faced storm-petrel, Pelagodroma marina (A)

== Northern storm-petrels ==
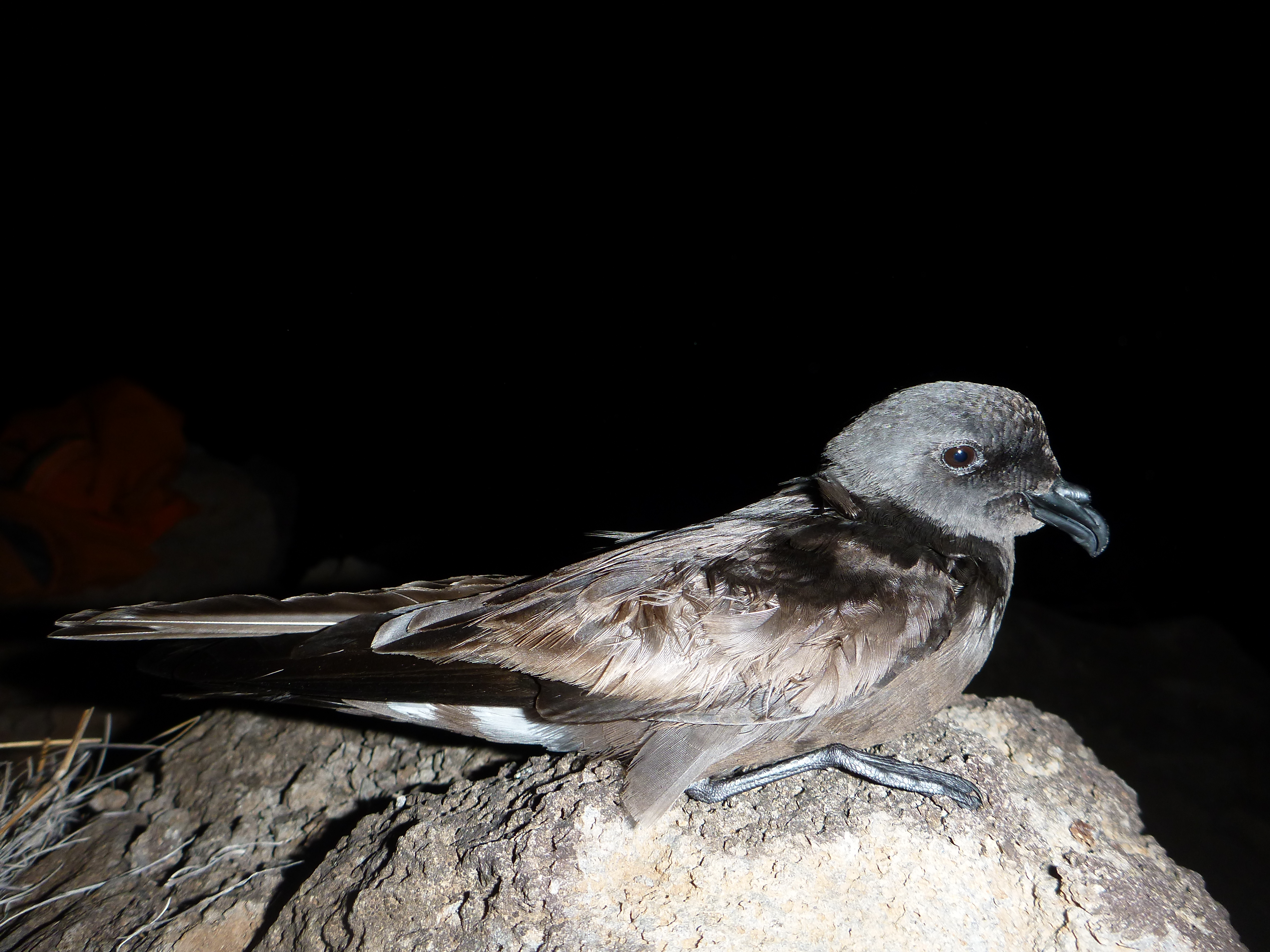
Band-rumped storm-petrel

Order: Procellariiformes Family: Hydrobatidae

Though the members of this family are similar in many respects to the southern storm-petrels, including their general appearance and habits, there are enough genetic differences to warrant their placement in a separate family.

- Wedge-rumped storm-petrel, Hydrobates tethys tethys (ES)
- Band-rumped storm-petrel, Hydrobates castro
- Leach's storm-petrel, Hydrobates leucorhoa (A)
- Markham's storm-petrel, Hydrobates markhami (A)
- Ringed storm-petrel, Hydrobates hornbyi
- Black storm-petrel, Hydrobates melania (A)

== Shearwaters ==
Order: Procellariiformes Family: Procellariidae

Petrels and shearwaters are known collectively as tubenoses for the tubes on their beaks which they use for excreting salt.

- Southern giant-petrel, Macronectes giganteus
- Northern giant-petrel, Macronectes halli
- Southern fulmar, Fulmarus glacialoides
- Cape petrel, Daption capense (A)
- Gould's petrel, Pterodroma leucoptera
- Mottled petrel, Pterodroma inexpectata (A)
- Galapagos petrel, Pterodroma phaeopygia (EB)
- Chatham petrel, Pterodroma axillaris
- Antarctic prion, Pachyptila desolata (A)
- Parkinson's petrel, Procellaria parkinsoni (A)
- Wedge-tailed shearwater, Ardenna pacificus (A)
- Sooty shearwater, Ardenna griseus (A)
- Pink-footed shearwater, Ardenna creatopus
- Flesh-footed shearwater, Ardenna carneipes
- Christmas shearwater, Puffinus navtitatis (A)
- Galapagos shearwater, Puffinus subalaris (EB)

== Frigatebirds ==
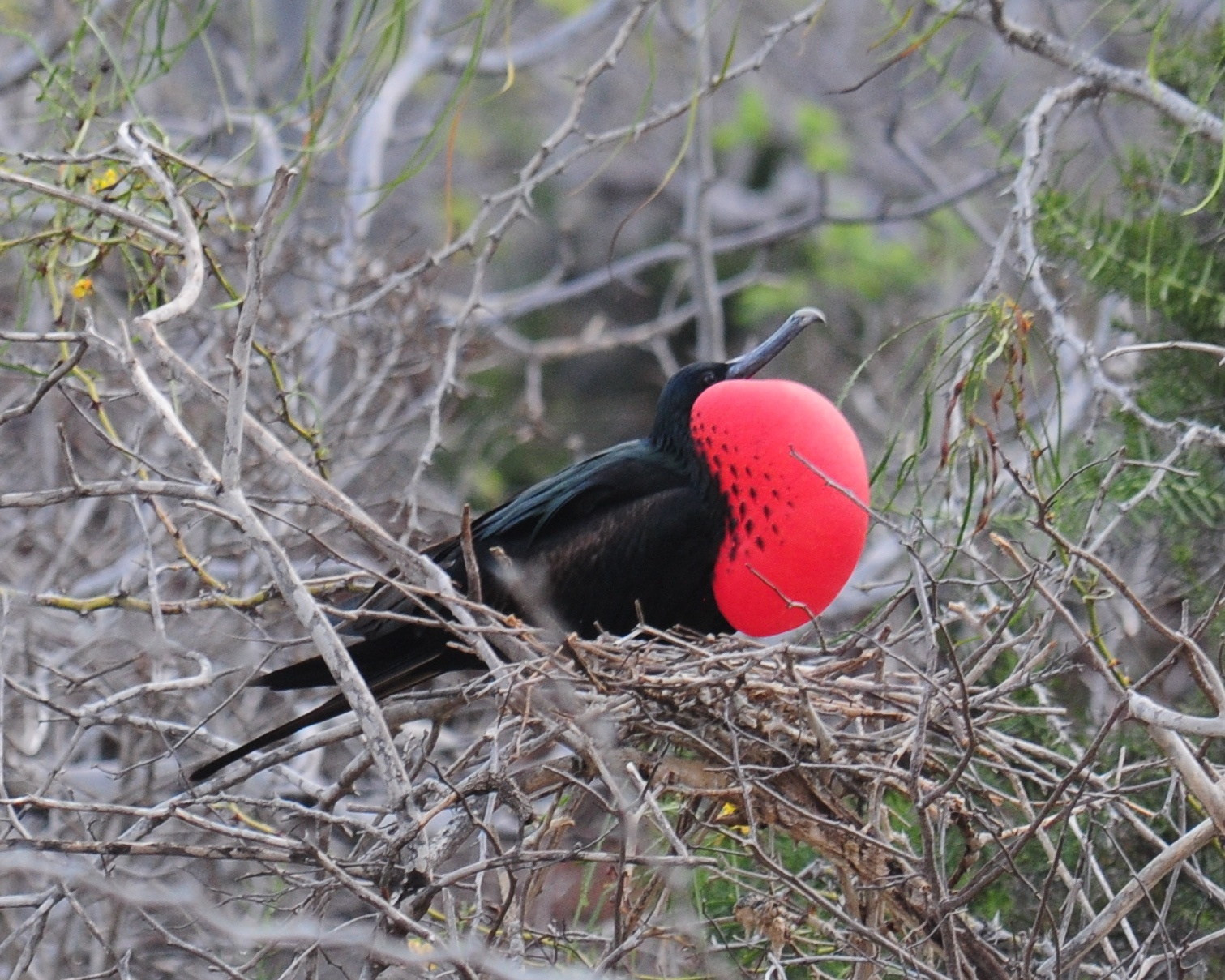
Magnificent frigatebird

Order: Suliformes Family: Fregatidae

Frigatebirds are black (with some white markings) seabirds. The males have a red throat patch to attract females.

- Magnificent frigatebird, Fregata magnificens magnificens (ES)
- Great frigatebird, Fregata minor

== Boobies ==
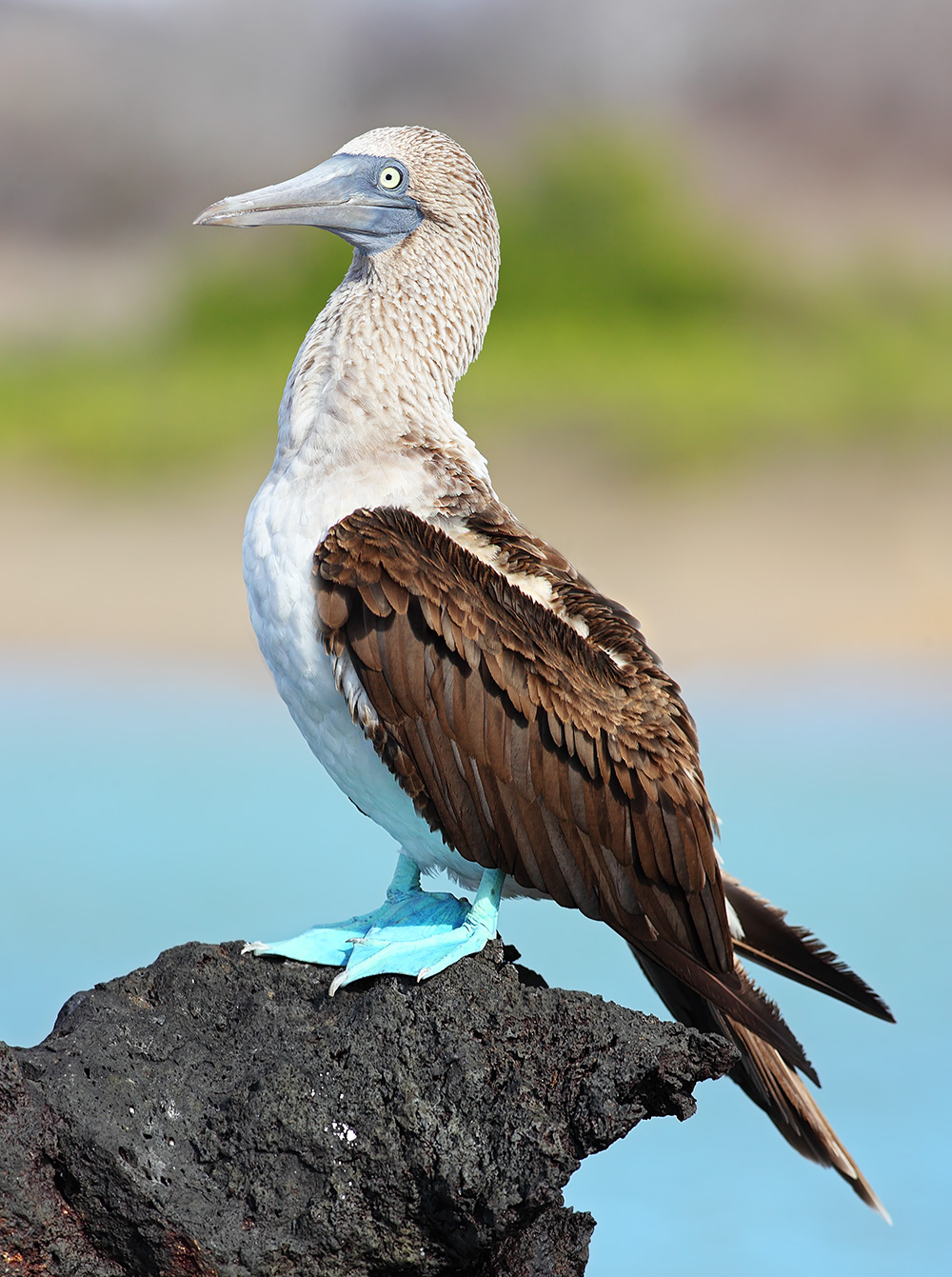
Blue-footed booby

Order: Suliformes Family: Sulidae

Boobies are seabirds which were once lumped along with darters, cormorants, and frigatebirds in Pelecaniformes. Their feet are variously coloured, black with striped toes in gannets, and grey, red, blue, yellow, black, or ochre in boobies.

- Blue-footed booby, Sula nebouxii excisa (ES)
- Peruvian booby, Sula variegata (A)
- Nazca booby, Sula granti
- Red-footed booby, Sula sula
- Brown booby, Sula leucogaster (A)

== Cormorants ==
Order: Suliformes Family: Phalacrocoracidae

Cormorants are seabirds which normally stand upright. Most of them have markings on their face and wings. Only the Galápagos species is flightless.

- Flightless cormorant, Phalacrocorax harrisi (E)

== Pelicans ==
Order: Pelecaniformes Family: Pelecanidae

Pelicans are large seabirds, variable in colour but alike in shape. All have a gular pouch to catch fish.

- Brown pelican, Pelecanus occidentalis urinator (ES)

== Herons ==
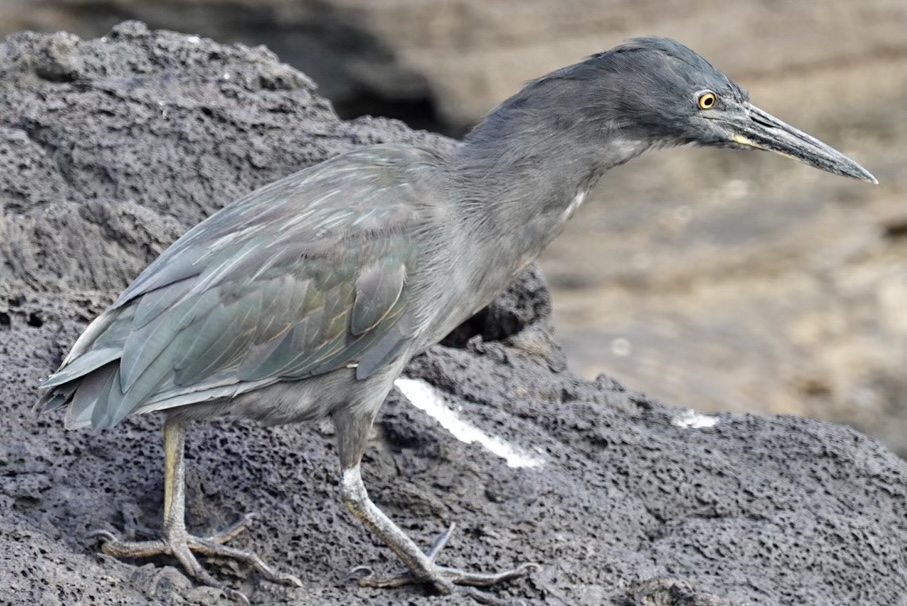
Striated heron

Order: Pelecaniformes Family: Ardeidae

Herons are long-necked long-legged water birds. The majority feed on fish and other pond-life.

- Tricolored heron, Egretta tricolor (A)
- Snowy egret, Egretta thula (A)
- Little blue heron, Egretta caerulea (A)
- Yellow-crowned night-heron, Nyctanassa violacea pauper (ES)
- Striated heron, Butorides striata sundevalli (ES)
- Green heron, Butorides virescens (V)
- Cattle egret, Ardea ibis (I)
- Great egret, Ardea alba
- Great blue heron, Ardea herodias cognata (ES)

== Osprey ==
Order: Accipitriformes Family: Pandionidae

Pandionidae is a monotypic family of fish-eating birds of prey. Its single species possesses a very large and powerful hooked beak, strong legs, strong talons, and keen eyesight.

- Osprey, Pandion haliaetus

== Hawks ==
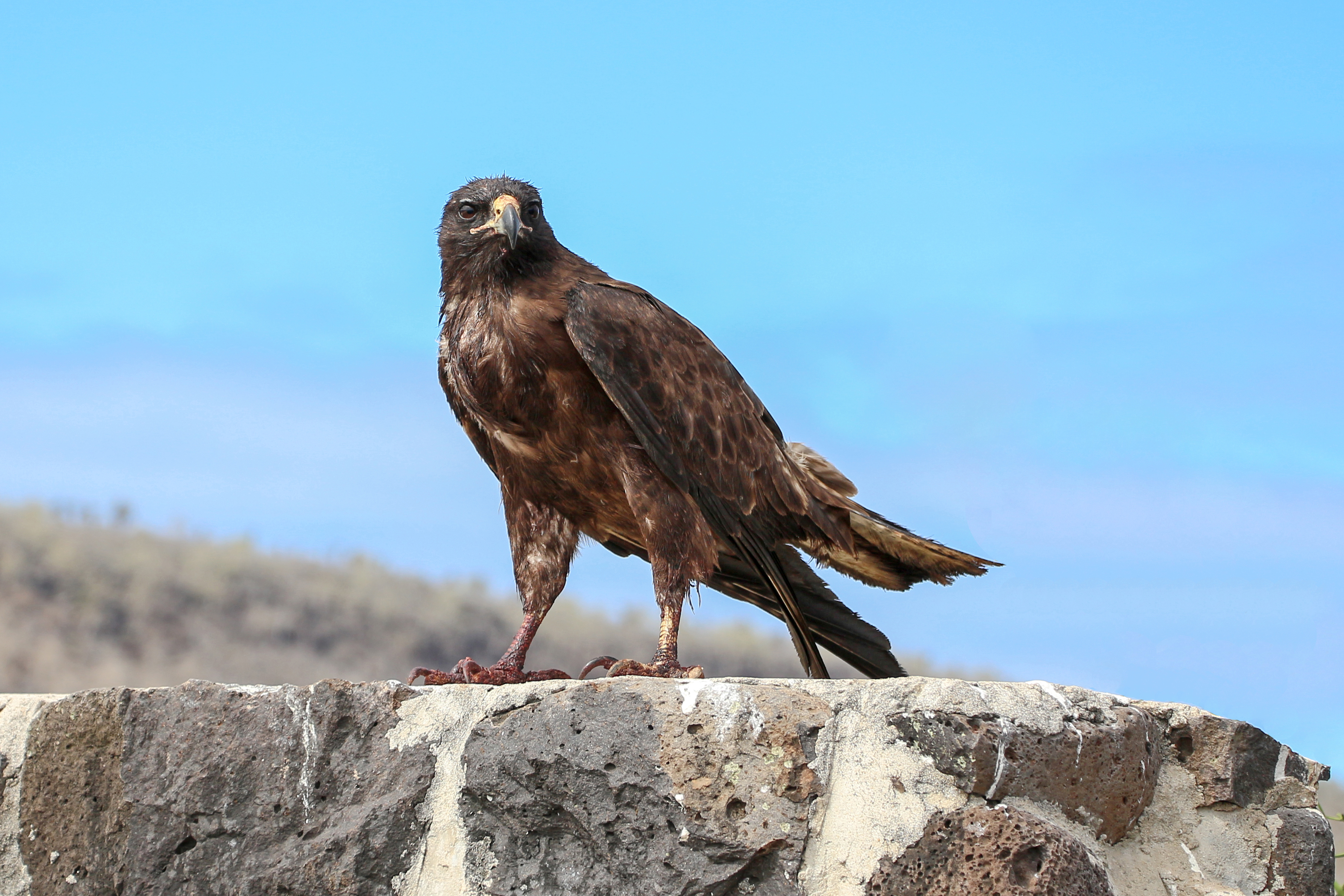
Galapagos hawk

Order: Accipitriformes Family: Accipitridae

Hawks are close relatives of eagles and kites although none of these have been recorded in the Galápagos.

- Galapagos hawk, Buteo galapagoensis (E)

== Barn owls ==
Order: Strigiformes Family: Tytonidae

Barn owls are owls with a heart-shaped face.

- American barn owl, Tyto furcata punctatissima (ES)

== Owls ==
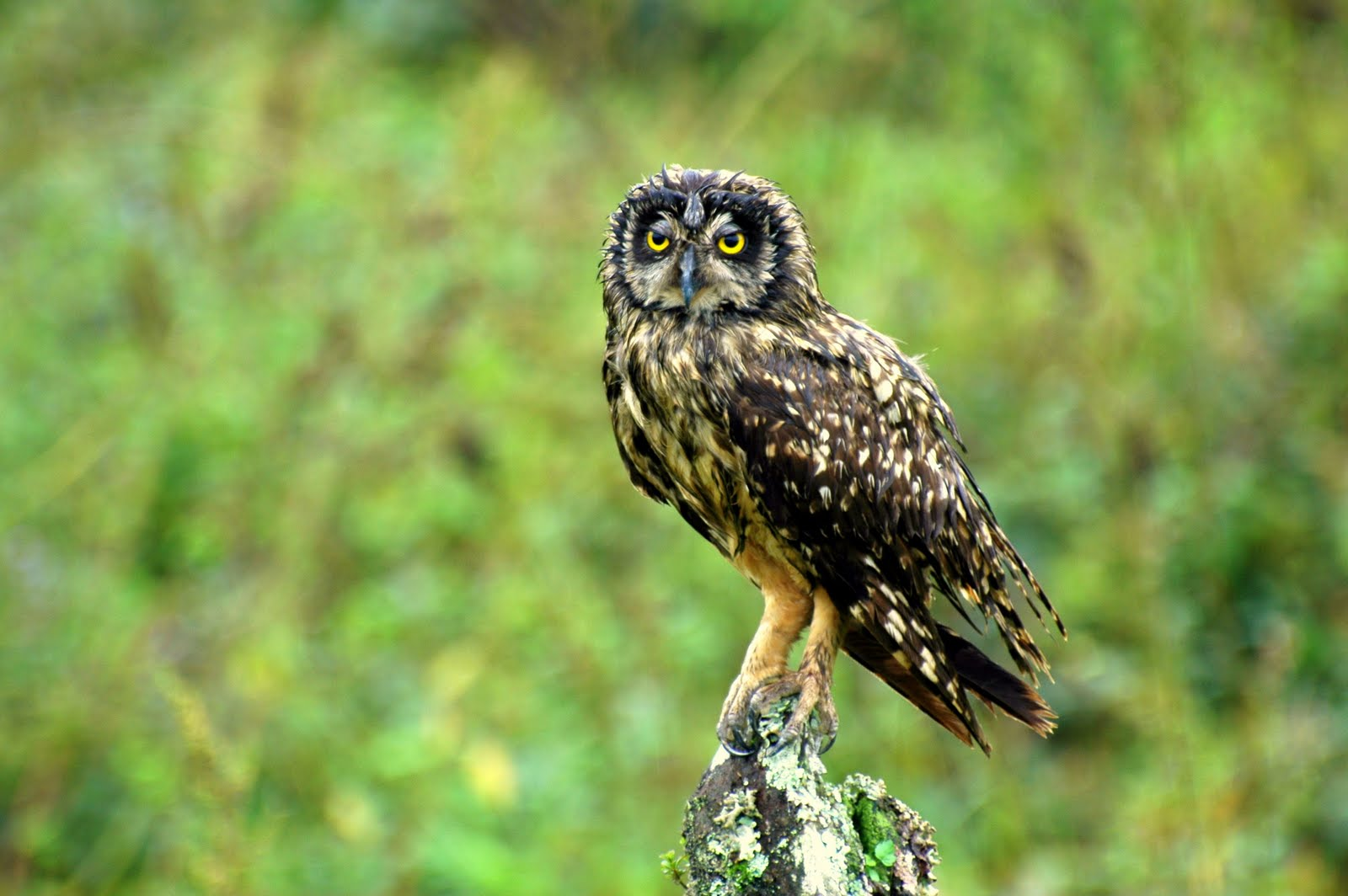
Short-eared owl

Order: Strigiformes Family: Strigidae

Typical or "true" owls are small to large solitary nocturnal birds of prey. They have large forward-facing eyes and ears, a hawk-like beak, and a conspicuous circle of feathers around each eye called a facial disk.

- Short-eared owl, Asio flammeus galapagoensis (ES)

== Kingfishers ==
Order: Coraciiformes Family: Alcedinidae

Kingfishers are medium-sized birds with large heads, long, pointed bills, short legs, and stubby tails.

- Belted kingfisher, Megaceryle alcyon

== Falcons ==
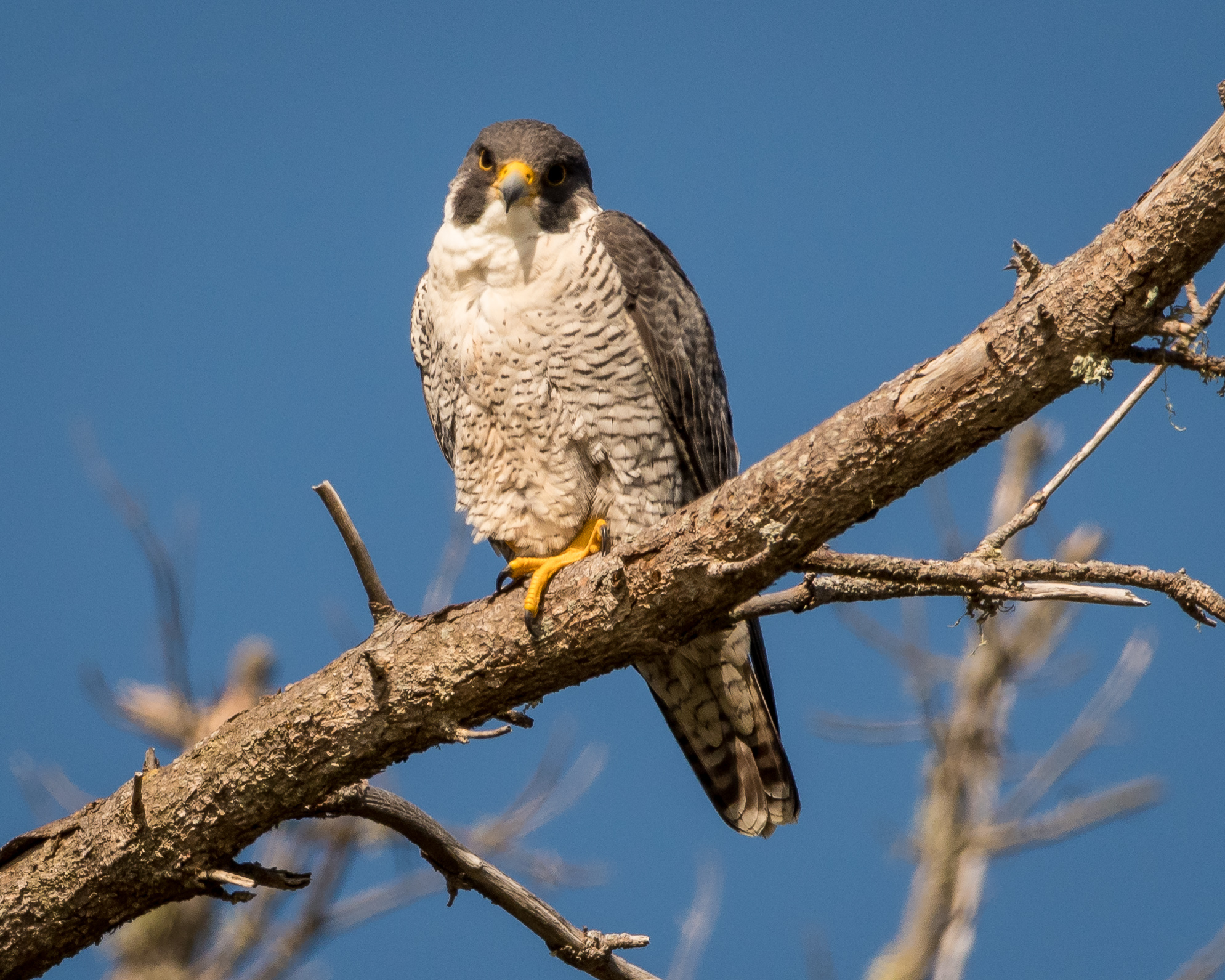
Peregrine falcon

Order: Falconiformes Family: Falconidae

Falcons are streamlined aerodynamic birds of prey which were traditionally thought to be closely related to the Accipitriformes. Recent genetic studies place them closer to parrots.

- Peregrine falcon, Falco peregrinus

== New World and African parrots ==
Order: Psittaciformes Family: Psittacidae

Parrots are colourful tropical species with a curved bill and zygodactyl feet.

- Red-masked parakeet, Psittacara erythrogenys (I)

== Tyrant flycatchers ==
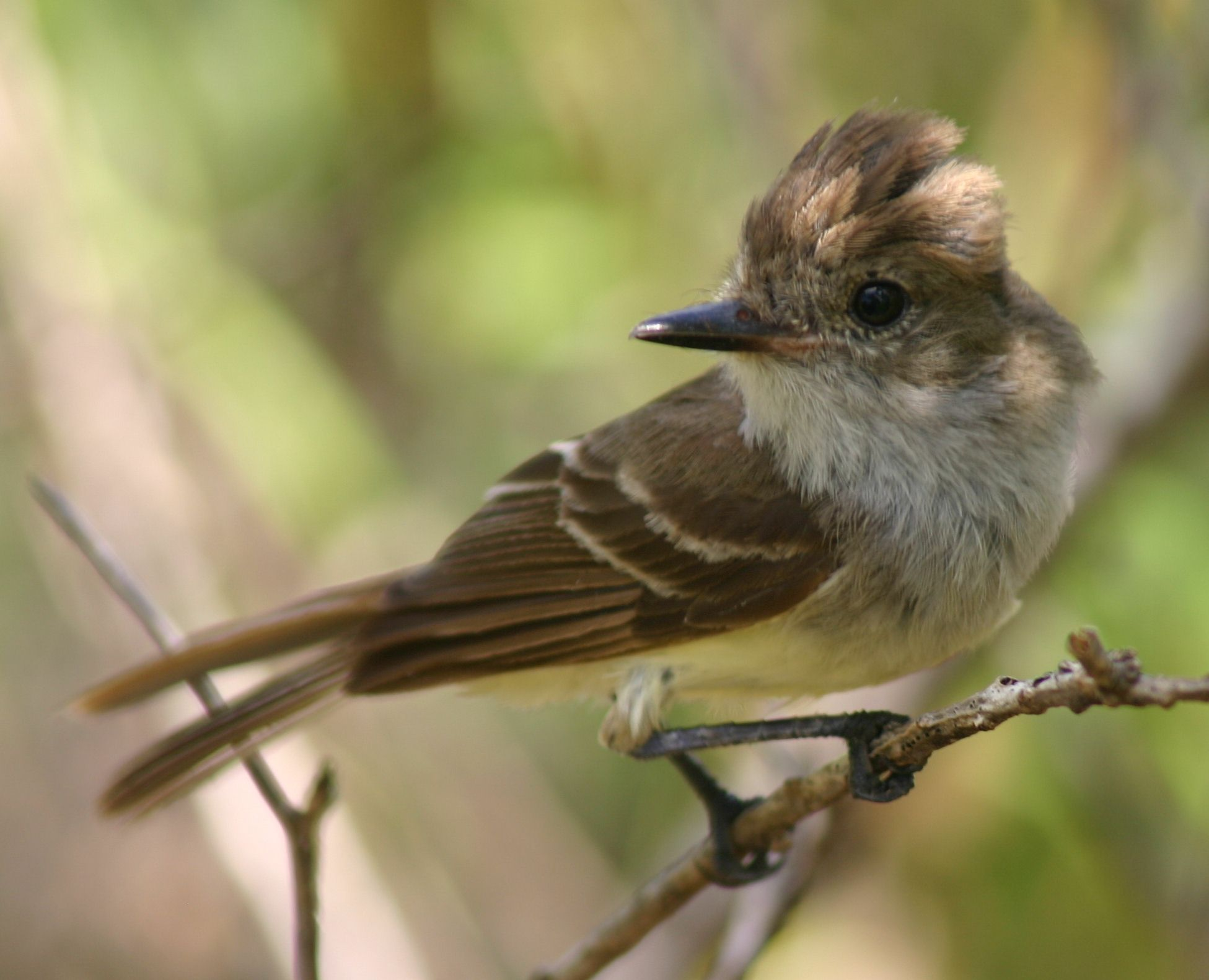
Galapagos flycatcher

Order: Passeriformes Family: Tyrannidae

Tyrant flycatchers are a group of American passerines which are not related to the Old World flycatchers of the family Muscicapidae.

- Fork-tailed flycatcher, Tyrannus savana (A)
- Eastern kingbird, Tyrannus tyrannus (A)
- Galapagos flycatcher, Myiarchus magnirostris (E)
- San Cristóbal vermilion flycatcher, Pyrocephalus dubius (E)(extinct)
- Brujo flycatcher, Pyrocephalus nanus (E)

== Vireos ==
Order: Passeriformes Family: Vireonidae

Vireos are small greenish or yellowish birds.

- Chivi vireo, Vireo chivi (A)

== Swallows ==
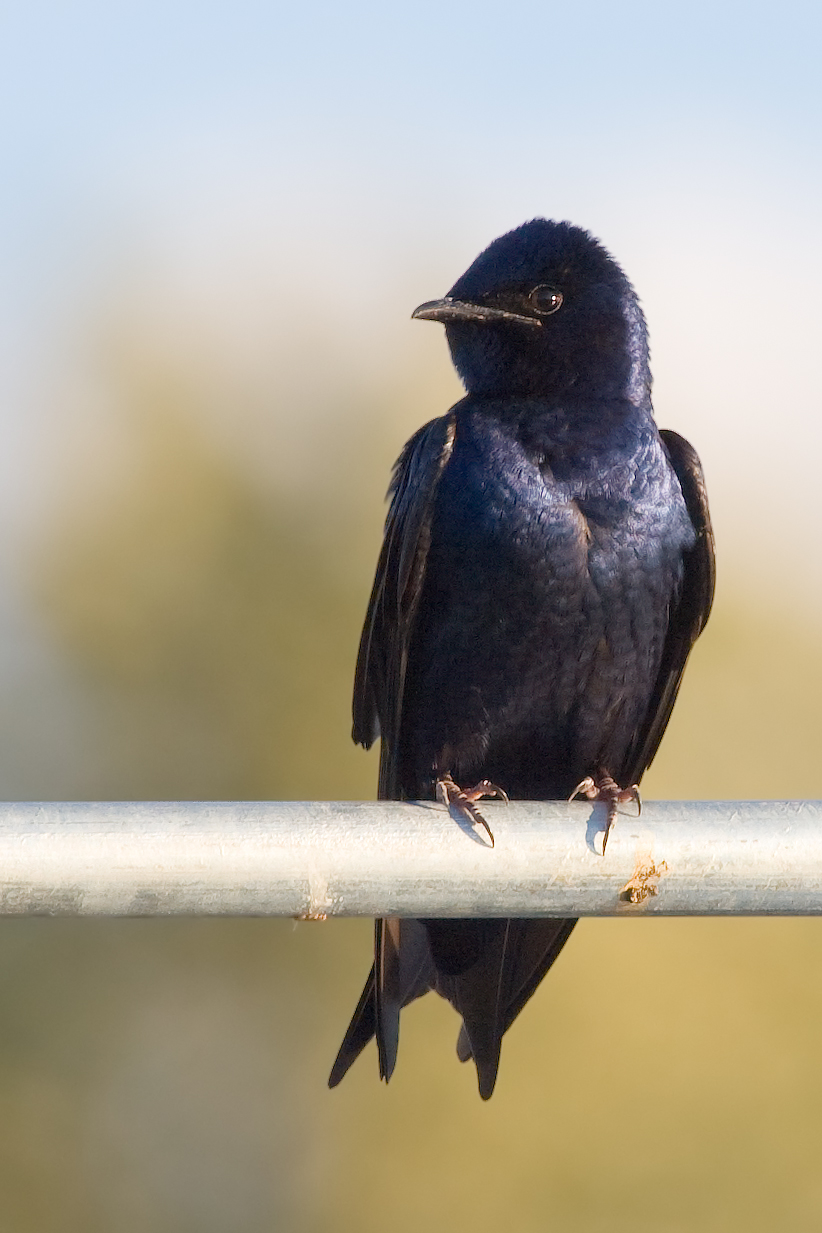
Purple martin

Order: Passeriformes Family: Hirundinidae

Swallows and martins are passerines not closely related to swifts although they have superficial resemblance. They have short pointed wings.

- Brown-chested martin, Progne tapera (A)
- Purple martin, Progne subis (A)
- Galapagos martin, Progne modesta (E)
- Bank swallow, Riparia riparia (A)
- Barn swallow, Hirundo rustica
- Cliff swallow, Pterochelidon pyrrhonota (A)

== Waxwings ==
Order: Passeriformes Family: Bombycillidae

Waxwings are medium-sized, plump birds. All three species in the family are migratory and occasionally turn up in unexpected places.

- Cedar waxwing, Bombycilla cedrorum (A)

== Mockingbirds ==
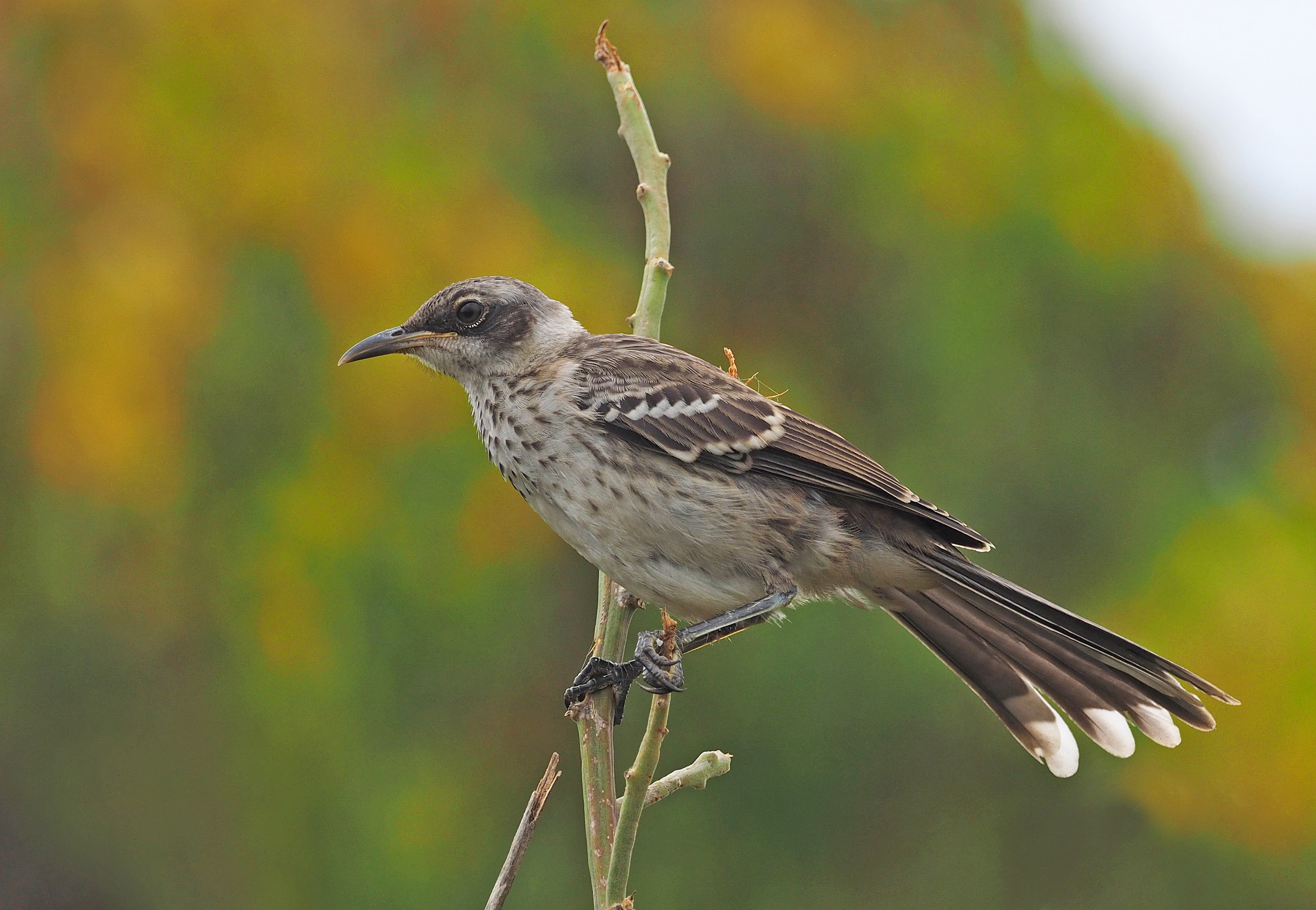
Galapagos mockingbird

Order: Passeriformes Family: Mimidae

Mockingbirds are an American group of passerine birds. In the Galápagos they are famous (along with Darwin's finches) for confirming Charles Darwin's theory of evolution.

- Galapagos mockingbird, Mimus parvulus (E)
- Floreana mockingbird, Mimus trifasciatus (E)
- Española mockingbird, Mimus macdonaldi (E)
- San Cristobal mockingbird, Mimus melanotis (E)

== Blackbirds ==
Order: Passeriformes Family: Icteridae

The icterids are a group of small to medium-sized, often colourful passerine birds restricted to the New World.

- Bobolink, Dolichonyx oryzivorus
- Great-tailed grackle, Quiscalus mexicanus (A)

== Wood-warblers ==
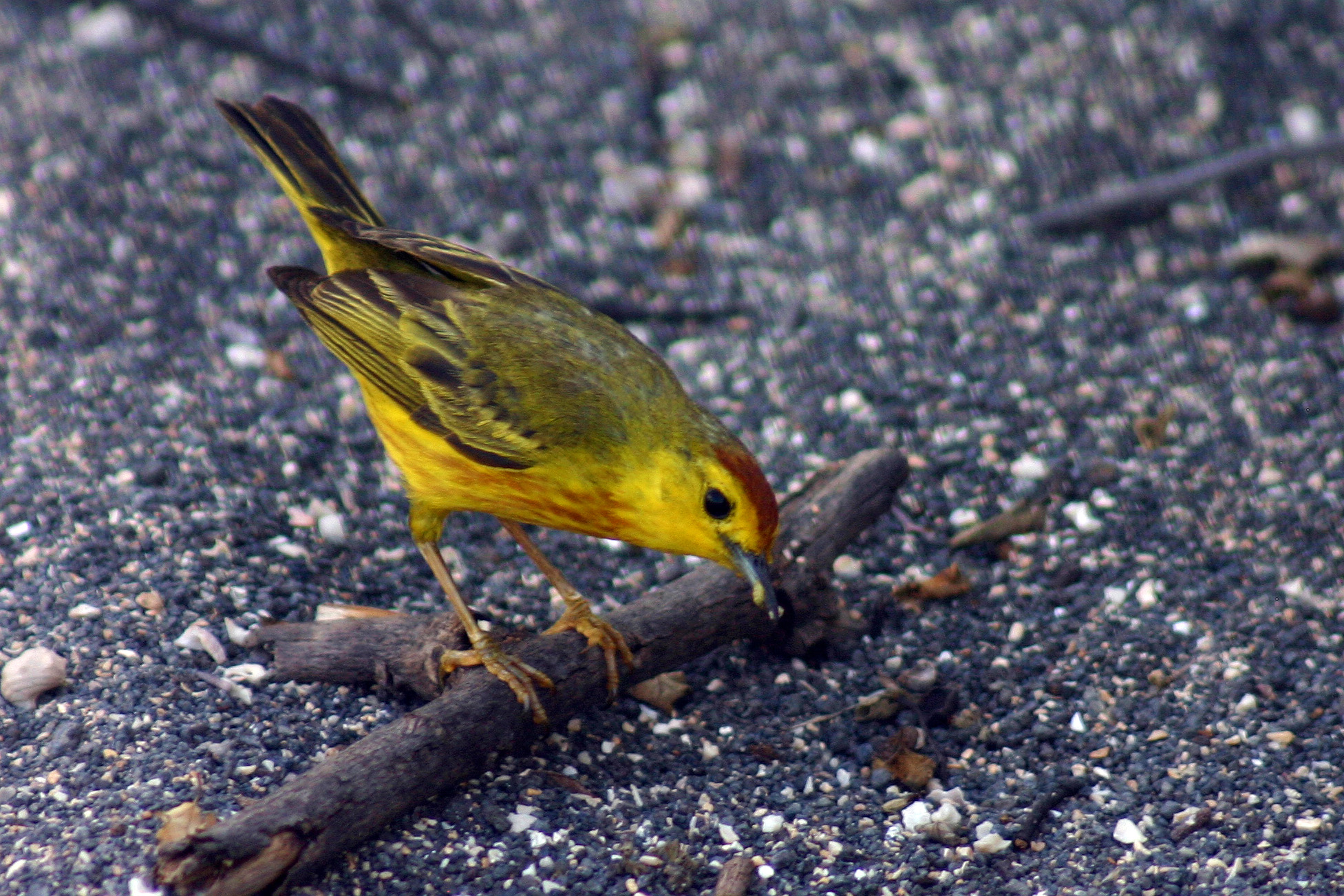
Yellow warbler

Order: Passeriformes Family: Parulidae

The wood-warblers are a group of small, often colorful, passerine birds restricted to the New World. Most are arboreal, but some are more terrestrial. Most members of this family are insectivores.

- Northern waterthrush, Parkesia noveboracensis (A)
- Prothonotary warbler, Protonotaria citrea (A)
- American redstart, Setophaga ruticilla (A)
- Yellow warbler, Setophaga petechia aureola (ES)
- Blackpoll warbler, Setophaga striata (A)

== Cardinals ==
Order: Passeriformes Family: Cardinalidae

Cardinals are a group of finch-like birds; most are colourful with seed-eating beaks.

- Summer tanager, Piranga rubra (A)
- Scarlet tanager, Piranga olivacea (A)
- Rose-breasted grosbeak, Pheucticus ludovicianus (A)
- Indigo bunting, Passerina cyanea (A)

== Tanagers ==
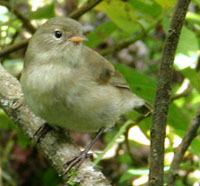
Green warbler finch

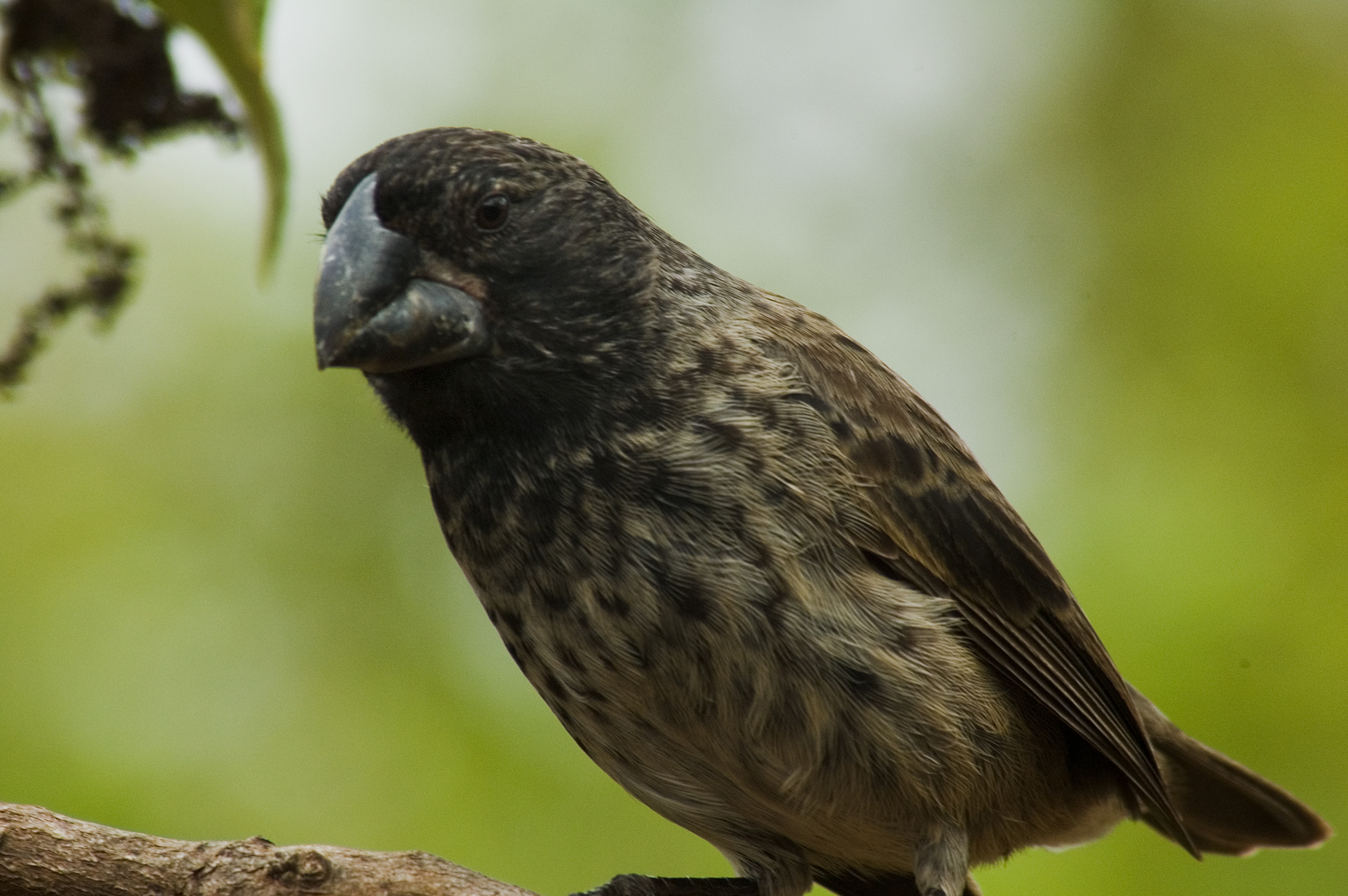
Large ground finch

Order: Passeriformes Family: Thraupidae

The tanagers are a large group of small to medium-sized passerine birds restricted to the New World, mainly in the tropics. Most of the 19 species in the family which have been recorded in the Galápagos are "Darwin's finches". Famous for inspiring Darwin in his theory of evolution, the finches have astonishingly different beaks.

- Saffron finch, Sicalis flaveola (I)
- Bananaquit, Coereba flaveola
- Green warbler-finch, Certhidea olivacea (E)
- Gray warbler-finch, Certhidea fusca (E)
- Vegetarian finch, Platyspiza crassirostris (E)
- Woodpecker finch, Camarhynchus pallidus (E)
- Large tree finch, Camarhynchus psittacula (E)
- Medium tree finch, Camarhynchus pauper (E)
- Small tree finch, Camarhynchus parvulus (E)
- Mangrove finch, Camarhynchus heliobates (E)
- Sharp-beaked ground-finch, Geospiza difficilis (E)
- Vampire ground-finch, Geospiza septentrionalis (E)
- Small ground-finch, Geospiza fuliginosa (E)
- Medium ground-finch, Geospiza fortis (E)
- Genovesa cactus-finch, Geospiza propinqua (E)
- Common cactus-finch, Geospiza scandens (E)
- Genovesa ground-finch, Geospiza acutirostris (E)
- Large ground-finch, Geospiza magnirostris (E)
- Española cactus-finch, Geospiza conirostris (E)

== See also ==
- List of birds of Ecuador
