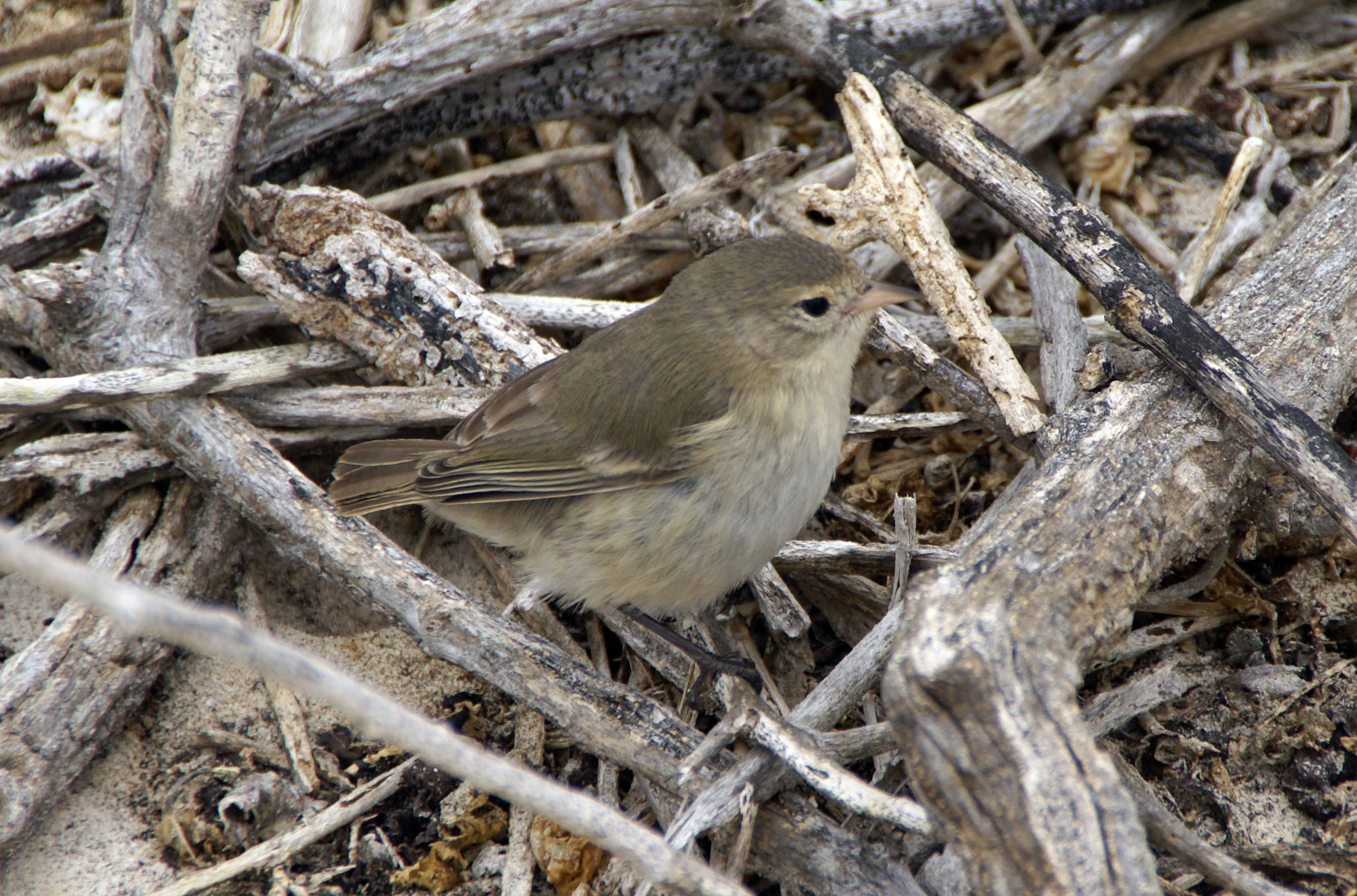
- Grey warbler-finch (Certhidea fusca)

Scientific classification
- Kingdom: Animalia
- Phylum: Chordata
- Class: Aves
- Order: Passeriformes
- Family: Thraupidae
- Genus: Certhidea; Gould, 1837

Type species
- Certhidea olivacea Gould, 1837

Species
- C. olivacea C. fusca

= Warbler-finch =

Warbler-finches

Genus of birds

The warbler-finches are a genus Certhidea of birds in the tanager family Thraupidae that are endemic to the Galápagos Islands. Together with related genera, they are collectively known as Darwin's finches.

The two species were formerly considered to be conspecific; however, they have different songs, prefer different habitats, and are located in different areas on the islands.

== Taxonomy and species list ==
The genus Certhidea was introduced in 1837 by the English ornithologist John Gould with the green warbler-finch as the type species. The name is a Latin diminutive of the genus Certhia introduced by Carl Linnaeus in 1758 for the treecreepers. The members of the genus form part of a group collectively known as Darwin's finches. Although traditionally placed with the buntings and New World sparrows in the family Emberizidae, molecular phylogenetic studies have shown that Darwin's finches are members of the subfamily Coerebinae within the tanager family Thraupidae. The genus contains the following two species.

Image	Scientific name	Common name	Distribution
	Certhidea olivacea	Green warbler-finch	Galápagos Islands, Ecuador
	Certhidea fusca	Grey warbler-finch	Galápagos Islands, Ecuador
