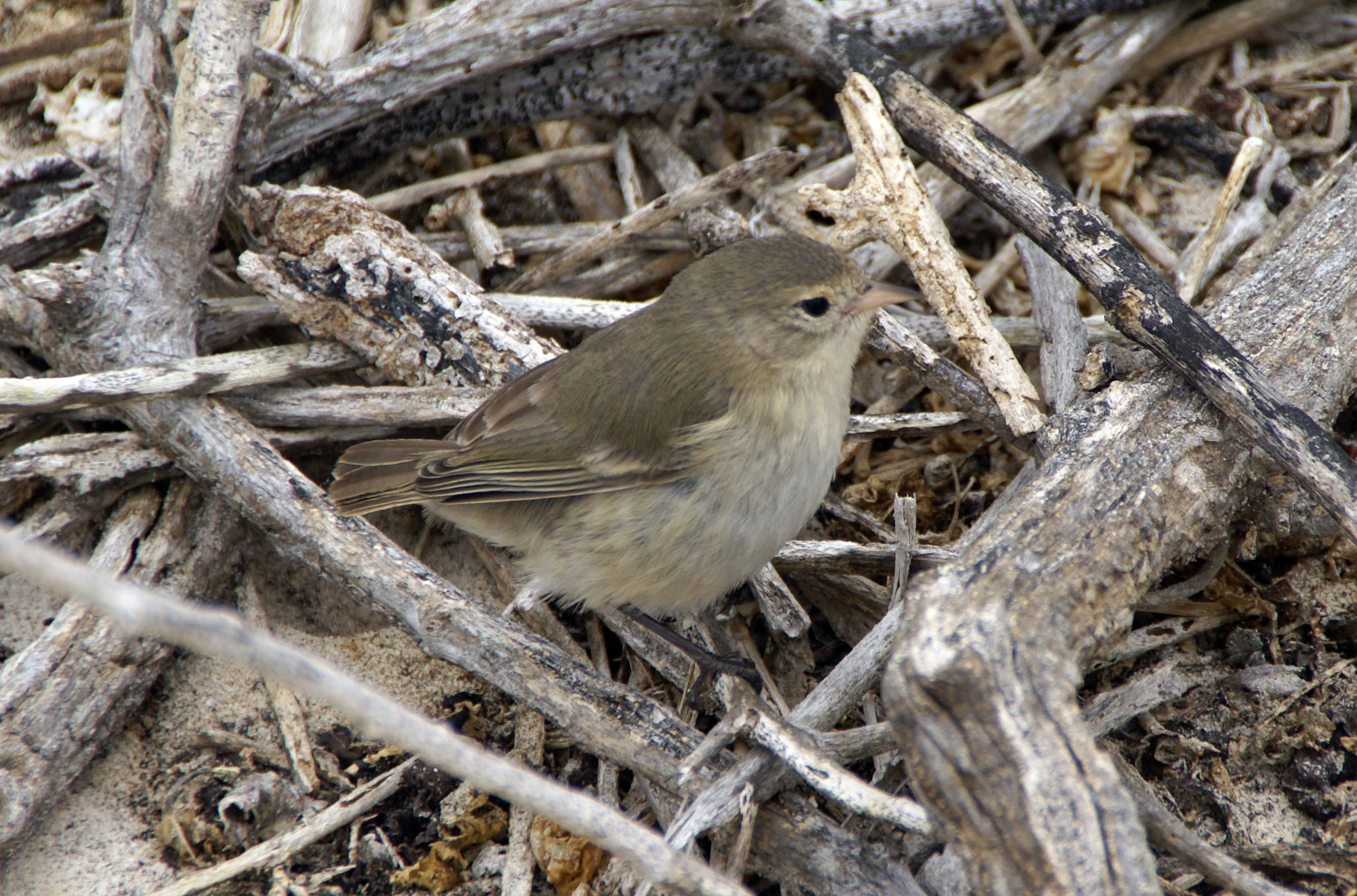
- On Española

Conservation status
- Least Concern (IUCN 3.1)

Scientific classification
- Kingdom: Animalia
- Phylum: Chordata
- Class: Aves
- Order: Passeriformes
- Family: Thraupidae
- Genus: Certhidea
- Species: C. fusca

Binomial name
- Certhidea fusca Sclater, PL & Salvin, 1870

= Grey warbler-finch =

Species of bird

The grey warbler-finch (Certhidea fusca) is a species of bird, one of Darwin's finches in the tanager family Thraupidae. Sometimes classified in the family Emberizidae, more recent studies have shown it to belong in the tanager family. It is endemic to the Galápagos Islands, Ecuador.

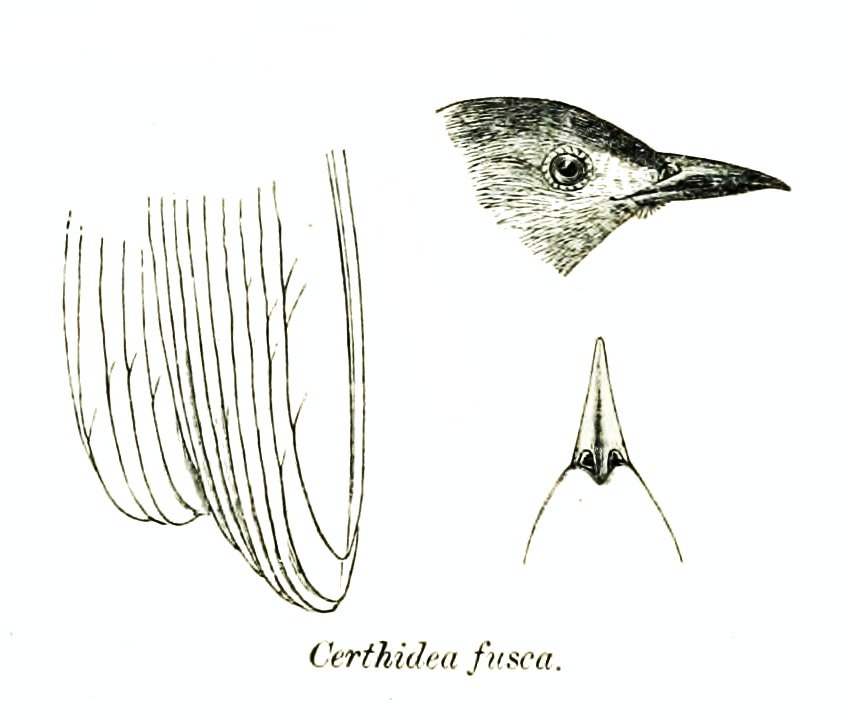
Illustration of wing and head

This species is closely related to the green warbler-finch, and were formerly considered conspecific, but both species differed in appearance, distribution, habitat, and song. The nominate subspecies is from Pinta and Marchena, becki from Darwin and Wolf, mentalis from Genovesa, bifasciata from Santa Fé, cinerascens from Española, luteola from San Cristóbal, and ridgwayi from Floreana. Grey warbler-finches are found mostly in the shrubland and dry forest of smaller drier islands, and have a suitable coloration for their habitat.

Its natural habitats are subtropical or tropical dry forests, subtropical or tropical moist montane forests, and subtropical or tropical dry shrubland.
