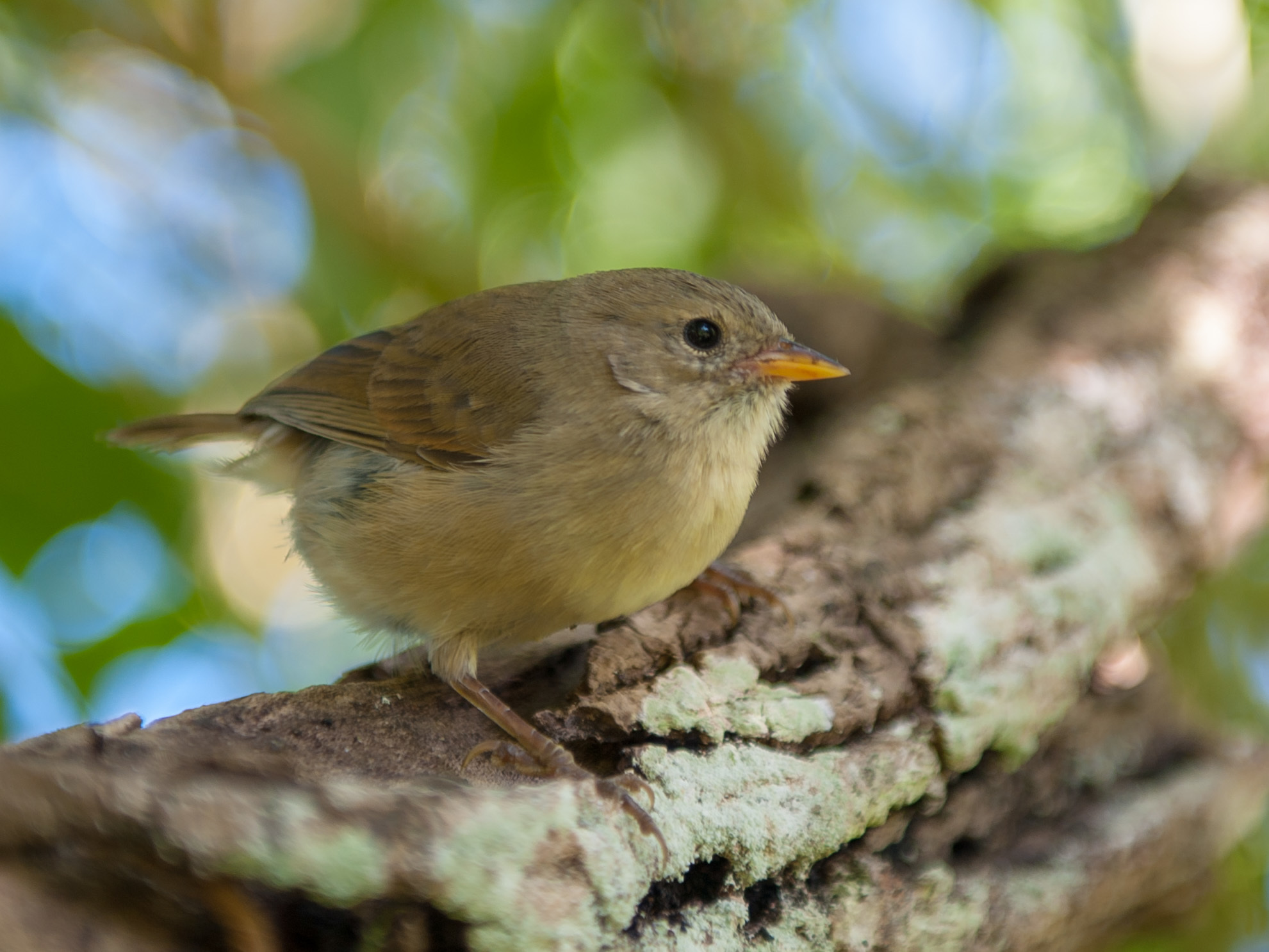

Conservation status
- Vulnerable (IUCN 3.1)

Scientific classification
- Kingdom: Animalia
- Phylum: Chordata
- Class: Aves
- Order: Passeriformes
- Family: Thraupidae
- Genus: Certhidea
- Species: C. olivacea

Binomial name
- Certhidea olivacea Gould, 1837

= Green warbler-finch =

Species of bird

The green warbler-finch (Certhidea olivacea) is a species of bird, one of Darwin's finches (which are mainly found in the Galápagos Islands) in the tanager family Thraupidae. Sometimes classified in the family Emberizidae, more recent studies have shown it to belong in the tanager family.

When Darwin collected it in 1835 during the Beagle survey expedition he mistakenly thought it was a wren, but on return to England he was informed in March 1837 by the ornithologist John Gould that the bird was in the group of finches.

It is endemic to the Galápagos Islands, Ecuador. This species is closely related to the grey warbler-finch, and the two were formerly considered conspecific, but both species differ in appearance, distribution, habitat, and song. Holding a distinctive place in the evolutionary history of Galápagos finches, phylogenetic studies suggest that the warbler-finches represent one of the earliest branches in the radiation of Galápagos finches, diverging prior to the more well-known ground finches and tree finches. With its slender, pointed beak adapted for capturing insects, the green warbler-finch occupies a unique ecological niche within the Galápagos archipelago. As such, the green warbler-finch serves as a crucial species for understanding the evolutionary processes that have shaped the remarkable avian diversity found in this iconic ecosystem.

== Appearance ==
The average size of green warbler-finches is 10 cm (3.9 in), and their weight can range from 8 to 10 grams (0.28 to 0.35 oz). Green warbler-finches have a greenish coloration to blend into their lusher semi-humid forest habitats, as well as distinctive reddish throat patches on breeding males. The upper half of the adult male is typically more sandy-brown, which differs from the female, as they have a more olive-brown upper half.

== Feeding and habitat ==
The green warbler-finch can use its sharp beak to gain access to different foods. Their diet consists mainly of seeds, insects, and small fruits. Some insects they eat include caterpillars, beetles, and ants, as well as spiders. They tend to eat more insects during the summer and more seeds, fruits, and berries during the winter months. The green warbler-finch tends to forage for food in small groups or alone.

The green warbler-finch consists of only one subspecies, the nominate olivacea, from Santiago, Rábida, Pinzón, Isabela, Fernandina, and Santa Cruz. Its natural habitats are subtropical or tropical dry forests, subtropical or tropical moist montane forests, and subtropical or tropical dry shrubland. They are most typically found on larger islands, most abundant in places that are humid and have higher elevation, and less abundant at places with low elevation and dry.

== Reproduction ==
The green warbler-finch exhibits monogamous behavior, often forming long-term bonds, and defends a small territory. It typically breeds during the hot wet season when bugs are plentiful. The male constructs a spherical nest using dry grasses, moss, and lichens, placing it on small branches. The female will then lay approximately 3 to 5 white eggs with reddish brown spots and incubate them alone for about 12 days. The young birds leave the nest only two weeks after hatching, contributing to the species' reproductive success.

== Status ==
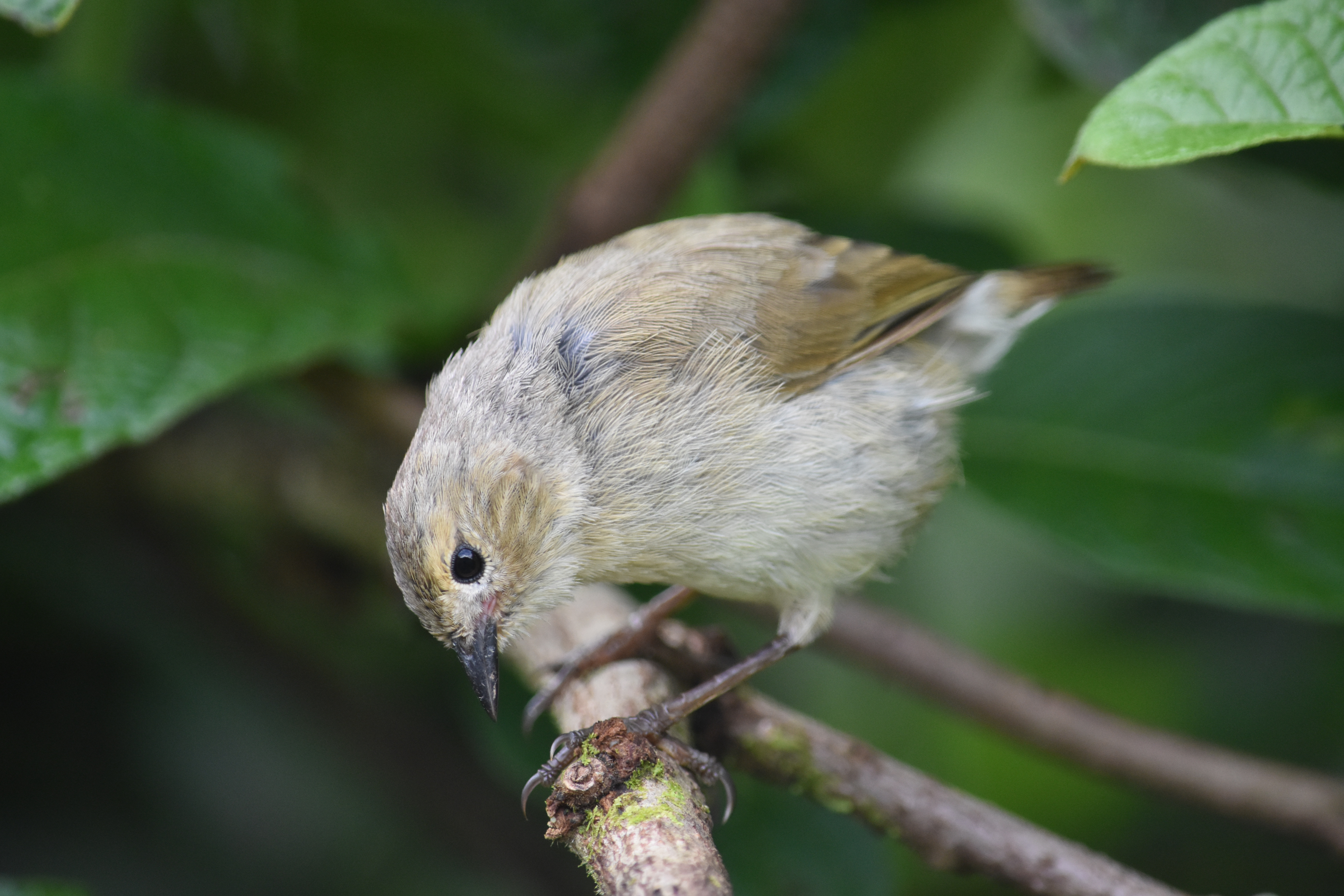
Female green warbler-finch on Santa Cruz Island

The green warbler-finch is currently classified as Vulnerable. This status reflects a significant decline in its population, attributed primarily to habitat loss from human activities and the spread of invasive plant species. Research and monitoring efforts, particularly on Santa Cruz Island in the Galápagos, show a troubling trend: between survey periods in 1997–1998 and 2008–2010, the green warbler-finch population declined by approximately 46%. This decline is most pronounced in humid, higher-elevation areas where habitat alteration and invasive species—such as the blackberry (Rubus niveus)—have disrupted the forest ecosystem, reduced insect prey availability, and affected breeding success. Ongoing conservation efforts, including habitat protection and ecological monitoring, aim to help mitigate the risk of extinction for this distinctive member of Darwin's finches.

Conservation efforts supporting the green warbler-finch (Certhidea olivacea) on the Galápagos Islands include several targeted actions:

- Galapagos National Park
- Charles Darwin Association and partner organizations
- Citizens Science and Technology
- Invasive species management
- Scientific Research and Ecological Studies
