= Evidence for speciation by reinforcement =

Overview article

Reinforcement assists speciation by selecting against hybrids.

Reinforcement is a process within speciation where natural selection increases the reproductive isolation between two populations of species by reducing the production of hybrids. Evidence for speciation by reinforcement has been gathered since the 1990s, and along with data from comparative studies and laboratory experiments, has overcome many of the objections to the theory. Differences in behavior or biology that inhibit formation of hybrid zygotes are termed prezygotic isolation. Reinforcement can be shown to be occurring (or to have occurred in the past) by measuring the strength of prezygotic isolation in a sympatric population in comparison to an allopatric population of the same species. Comparative studies of this allow for determining large-scale patterns in nature across various taxa. Mating patterns in hybrid zones can also be used to detect reinforcement. Reproductive character displacement is seen as a result of reinforcement, so many of the cases in nature express this pattern in sympatry. Reinforcement's prevalence is unknown, but the patterns of reproductive character displacement are found across numerous taxa (vertebrates, invertebrates, plants, and fungi), and is considered to be a common occurrence in nature. Studies of reinforcement in nature often prove difficult, as alternative explanations for the detected patterns can be asserted. Nevertheless, empirical evidence exists for reinforcement occurring across various taxa and its role in precipitating speciation is conclusive.

== Evidence from nature ==
=== Amphibians ===
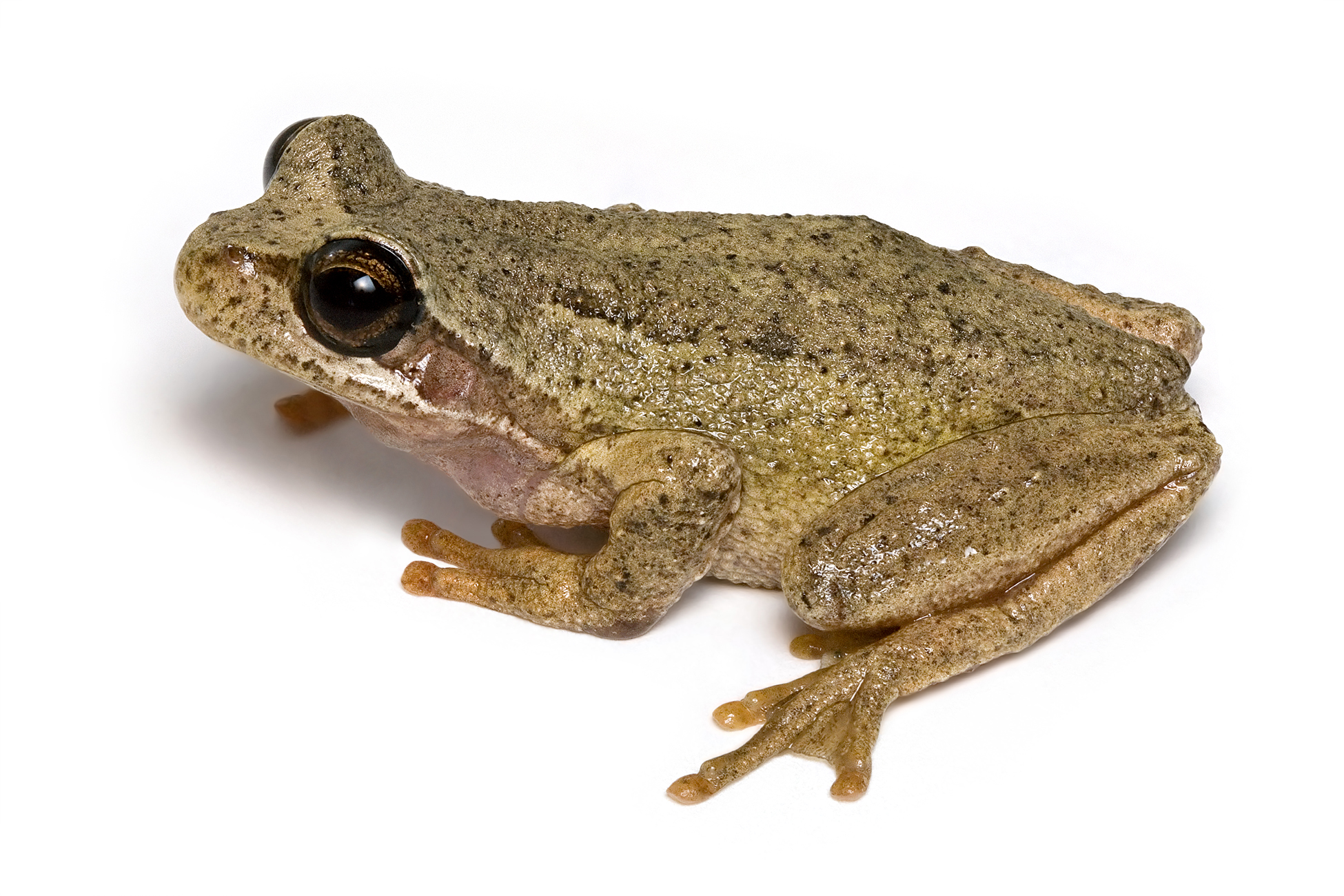
The southern brown tree frog, Litoria ewingi

The two frog species Litoria ewingi and L. verreauxii live in southern Australia with their two ranges overlapping. The species have very similar calls in allopatry, but express clinal variation in sympatry, with notable distinctness in calls that generate female preference discrimination. The zone of overlap sometimes forms hybrids and is thought to originate by secondary contact of once fully allopatric populations.

Allopatric populations of Gastrophryne olivacea and G. carolinensis have recently come into secondary contact due to forest clearing. The calls that the males make to attract females differ significantly in frequency and duration in the area where the two species overlap, despite them having similar calls where they do not. Further, the hybrids that form in sympatry have calls that are intermediate between the two. Similar patterns of reproductive character displacement involving acoustic displays have been found in Hyla cinerea and H. gratiosa, with greater female preference for conspecific males in areas of sympatry.

Three species of true frogs (Lithobates sphenocephalus, L. berlandieri, and L. blairi) are temporally isolated in that their breeding seasons are spaced out in areas where they live in sympatry, but not where they live in allopatry. Selection against interspecific mating due to low hybrid fitness and low hybrid fertility has reinforced the observed character displacement of breeding times.

The rainforests of northeast Queensland, Australia were separated into north and south refugia by climate fluctuations of the Pliocene and Pleistocene. About 6500 years ago, the rainforests reconnected, bringing the diverged, incipient populations of Spicicalyx serrata into secondary contact. The species contact zones exhibit, "strong postzygotic selection against hybrids" and enhanced isolation from differences in mating call.

An alternative to detecting reproductive character displacement in populations that overlap in sympatry is measuring rates of hybridization in contact zones. The frog species Anaxyrus americanus and Anaxyrus woodhousii have shown a decrease in hybridization from 9% to 0% over approximately 30 years. A similar pattern was detected in the sympatric spadefoot toads Spea multiplicata and S. bombifrons have hybridized with decreasing frequency over a 27-year period (about 13 generations).

=== Birds ===
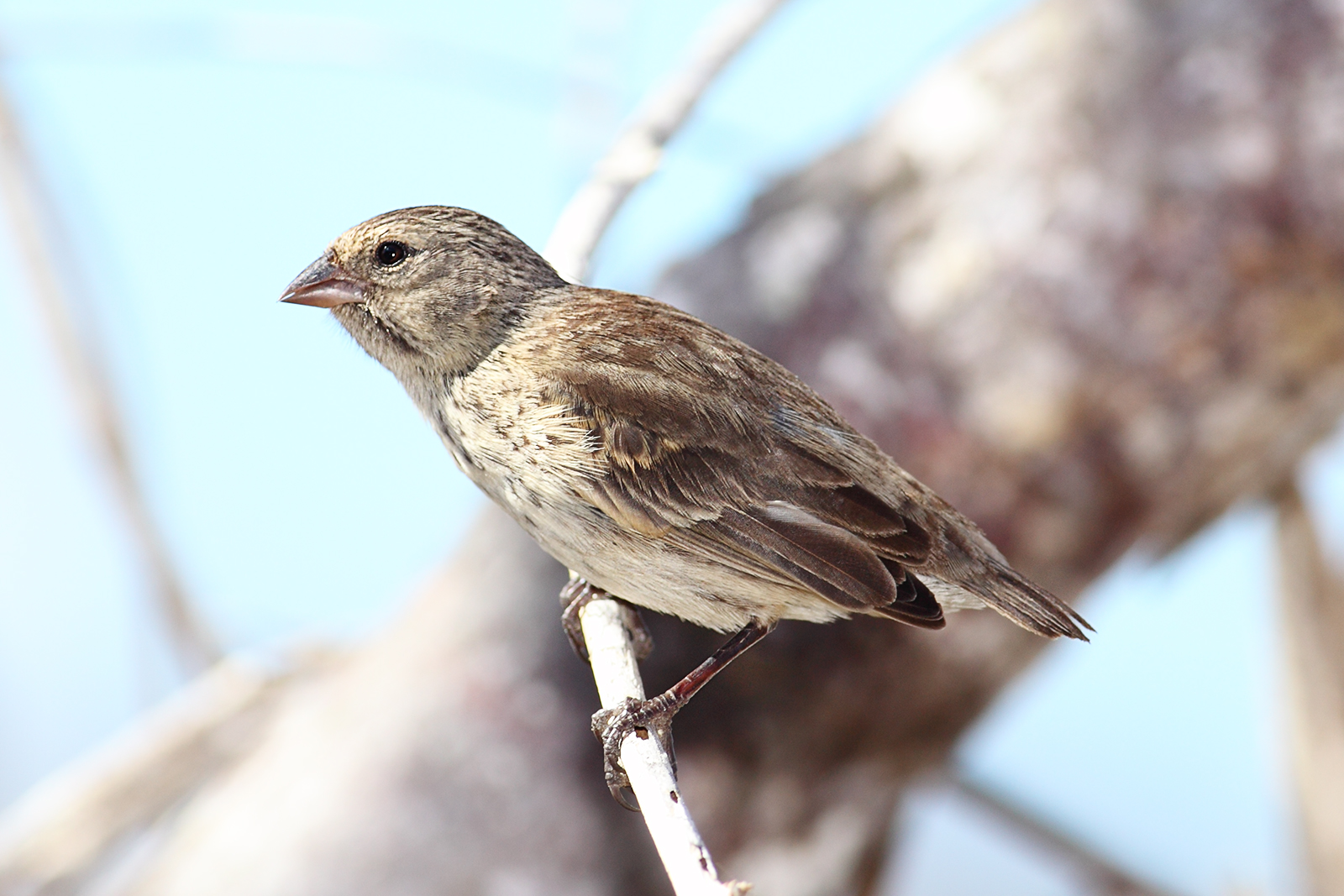
The small ground finch, one of Darwin's finches of the Galápagos

The Ficedula flycatchers exhibit a pattern that suggests premating isolation is being reinforced by sexual selection. The pied flycatcher (Ficedula hypoleuca) has brown females, brown males, and black-and-white males. The related collard flycatcher (Ficedula albicollis) has brown females and only black-and-white males. The two species exist in separate populations that overlap in a zone of sympatry. In the range of overlap, only brown males of F. hypoleuca exist and are thought to have evolved the brown plumage to prevent hybridization, though there is also evidence indicating that such character displacement is explained by heterospecific competition for territory rather than reinforcement. Mating choice tests of the species find that females of both species choose conspecific males in sympatry, but heterospecific males in allopatry (see conspecific song preference). The patterns could suggest mimicry, driven by interspecific competition; however, song divergence has been detected that shows a similar pattern to the mating preferences.

Geospiza fuliginosa and G. difficilis males on the Galápagos Islands show a noted preference for conspecific females where they meet in sympatry, but not in allopatry. Other birds such as the dark and light subspecies of the western grebe show enhanced prezygotic isolation. It has been argued that reinforcement is extremely common in birds and has been documented in a wide range of bird species.

=== Crustaceans ===
Reproductive character displacement in body size was detected in sympatric populations of Orconectes rusticus and O. sanbornii.

=== Echinoderms ===
An example of gametic isolation involves the allopatric sea urchins (Arbacia) have minimal bindin differences (bindin is a protein involved in the process of sea urchin fertilization, used for species-specific recognition of the egg by the sperm) and have insufficient barriers to fertilization. Comparison with the sympatric species Echinometra and Strongylocentrotus of the Indo-Pacific finds that they have significant differences in bindin proteins for fertilization and marked fertilization barriers.

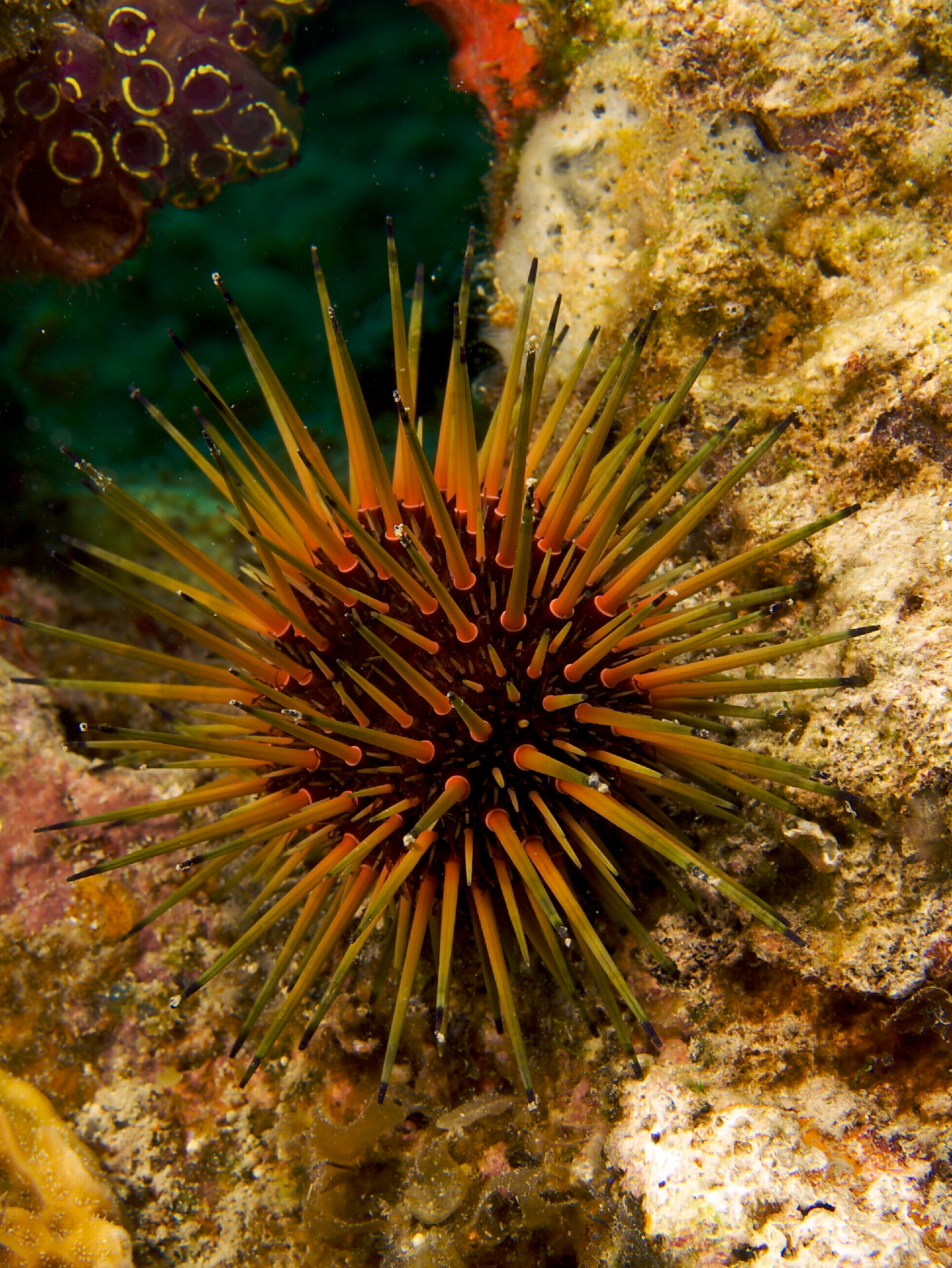
Echinometra viridis, one of several species in the genus that produce fertile hybrids

Laboratory matings of closely related sea urchin species Echinometra oblonga and E. sp. C (the species is unnamed, dubbed C) produce fertile and viable hybrids, but are unable to fertilize eggs of the parent species due to divergence of the alleles that code for bindin proteins: an example of post-zygotic isolation. Populations in sympatry manifest this difference in bindin protein versus those in allopatry. Selection actively acts against the formation of hybrids in both nature (as no documented cases of hybrids have been found) and in the laboratory. Here, the evolution of female egg receptors is thought to pressure bindin evolution in a selective runaway process. This example of reproductive character displacement is highly suggestive of being the result of—and has been cited as strong evidence for—reinforcement.

=== Fish ===
In British Columbia, benthic and limnetic morphs of Gasterosteus aculeatus exist together in sympatry in some lakes, while containing only one morph in other lakes. Female benthic morphs in sympatric populations actively discriminate against limnetic males, resulting in low rates of crossing (some gene flow has occurred between the morphs) and low fitness hybrids. Both selection against hybrids and reproductive character displacement in egg fertilization is observed in Etheostoma lepidum and E. spectabile.

=== Fungi ===
A strong case of reinforcement occurring in fungi comes from studies of Neurospora. In crosses between different species in the genera, sympatric pairs show low reproductive success, significantly lower than allopatric pairs. This pattern is observed across small and large geographic scales, with distance correlating with reproductive success. Further evidence of reinforcement in the species was the low fitness detected in the hybrids create from crosses, and that no hybrids have been found in nature, despite close proximity.

=== Insects ===
Ethological isolation has been observed between some mosquito species in the Southeast Asian Aedes albopictus group, suggesting—from laboratory experiments of mating trials—that selection against hybrids is occurring, in the presence of reproductive character displacement.

Female mate discrimination is increased with intermediate migration rates between allopatric populations of Timema cristinae (genus Timema) compared to high rates of migration (where gene flow impedes selection) or low rates (where selection is not strong enough).

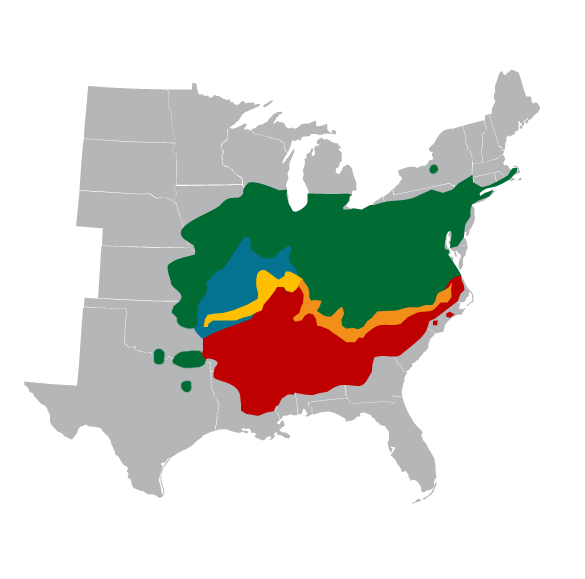
Distribution of the periodical cicadas in the U.S. The yellow area corresponds to the sympatric overlap of Magicicada neotredecim (blue) with Magicicada tredecim (red).

Where the ranges of the cicada species Magicicada tredecim and M. neotredecim overlap (where they are sympatric), the pitch of M. neotredecim male calling songs is roughly 1.7 kHz compared to 1.1 kHz for those of M. tredecim, with corresponding female song pitch preference differences. In allopatric M. neotredecim populations, the mating call pitch is 1.3–1.5 kHz. The biogeography of the cicadas suggests that M. neotredecim originated after the retreat of the last glacial advance in North America.

The song differences of Laupala crickets on the Hawaiian Islands appear to exhibit patterns consistent with character displacement in sympatric populations. A similar pattern exists with Allonemobius fasciatus and A. socius, species of ground crickets in eastern North America.

Males in sympatric populations of the damselflies Calopteryx maculata and C. aequabilis are able to discriminate between females of different species better than those in allopatric populations; with females of C. aequabilis in sympatric populations exhibiting lighter wing colors compared to allopatric females—an illustration of reproductive character displacement.

Fifteen species of sympatrically distributed Agrodiaetus butterflies with pronounced differences in wing color pattern likely arose as a result of speciation by reinforcement. Phylogenetic patterns indicate the differences arose in allopatry and were reinforced when the distributions came into secondary contact.

==== Drosophila ====
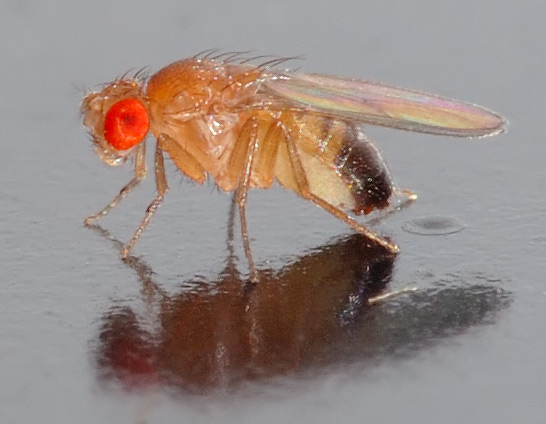
Drosophila fruit fly

Drosophila is one of the most studied species in speciation research. Dobzhansky and Koller were the first to study isolation between Drosophila species. Since then, other studies of natural populations such as the D. paulistorum races exhibiting stronger isolation in sympatry versus allopatry, or the enhanced isolation found in sympatric populations of D. mojavensis and D. arizonae in southwest America. Rare, sterile hybrids form between D. pseudoobscura and D. persimilis, with sympatric D. pseudoobscura females discriminating against D. persimilis males; more so than allopatric populations. Other Drosophila research on reinforcement has been from laboratory experiments and is discussed below. On the east coast of Australia, D. serrata shares a zone of sympatric overlap with the closely related species D. birchii. The species exhibits reproductive character displacement, with sexual selection operating on the hydrocarbons of the flies cuticle. Reinforcement appears to be driving their speciation in nature, supported by simulated experimental laboratory populations.

=== Mammals ===
The deer mice Peromyscus leucopus and P. gossypinus exhibit reproductive character displacement in mating preferences, with heterospecific matings taking place between the species.

=== Molluscs ===
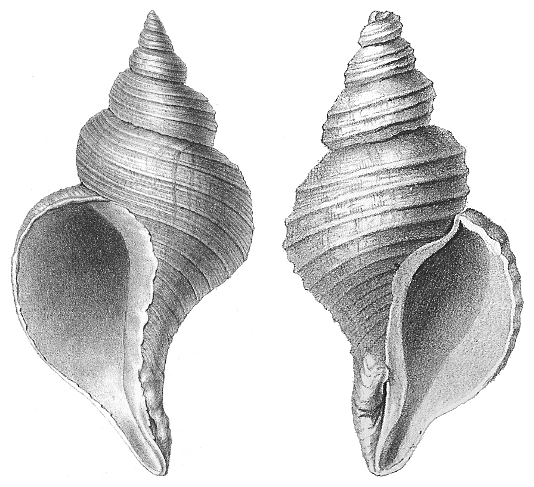
Some gastropod shells, like those of Partula can coil in sinistral and dextral directions such as these, Neptunea angulata (left) and N. despecta (right) shells.

Partula suturalis is polymorphic for shell chirality in that it has two forms: sinistral (left-handed) and dextral (right-handed) shells, unlike other monomorphic species on the island of Mo'orea which have only one form (with the exception of P. otaheitana). This polymorphic trait has a direct effect on mate choice and mating behavior; as shown in laboratory mating tests that opposite-coil pairs mate much less often. In areas where P. suturalis lives sympatrically with other sinistral and dextral Partula species, the opposite P. suturalis morph is typically present. Butlin succinctly describes one example of this unique pattern:

P. suturalis is sympatric with the dextral P. aurantia and sinistral P. olympia, whose ranges abut but do not overlap; P. suturalis is sinestral in the range of P. aurantia and dextral in the range of P. olympia and does not normally hybridize with either species. However, where their ranges meet there is a sharp transition in the coil of P. suturalis and in this transition zone it hybridizes with both P. aurantia and P. olympia.

The reversal in chirality to sinistrality must have evolved as an isolating mechanism, with patterns of reproductive character displacement suggesting speciation by reinforcement.

Satsuma largillierti lives on the western half of Okinawa Island while Satsuma eucosmia lives on the eastern half. Both populations overlap in sympatry along the middle of the island, where the penis length of the species differs significantly in sympatry (a case of reproductive character displacement), but not in allopatry. A similar pattern in snails is found with Lymnaea peregra and L. ovata in the Swiss lake Seealpsee; with mating signal acting as the sympatrically displaced trait.

The abalone genus Haliotis has 19 species that occur in sympatry and one that occurs in allopatry. Of the sympatric species, they all contain sperm lysin that drives gamete isolation, but the allopatric species does not. A similar pattern of sperm lysin differentiation is found in the mussel species Mytilus galloprovincialis and M. trossulus and has likely occurred within the last 200 years due to human-mediated distribution by ships.

=== Plants ===
Plants are thought to provide suitable conditions for reinforcement to occur. This is due to a number of factors such as the unpredictability of pollination, pollen vectors, hybridization, hybrid zones, among others. The study of plants experiencing speciation by reinforcement has largely been overlooked by researchers; however, there is evidence of its occurrence in them.

In the Texas wildflower Phlox drummondii, cis-regulatory mutations of genes that code for anthocyanin pigmentation have caused genetic divergence of two populations. Hybrids (between P. drummondii and P. cuspidata) with maladaptive, intermediate characteristics are under-pollinated; increasing reproductive isolation through reinforcement. The maintenance of the ancestral flower color in the allopatric population is favored weakly by selection, where the derived color in the sympatric population is being driven by strong selection. Similarly, in P. pilosa and P. glaberrima, character displacement of petal color has been driven by selection, aided by pollen discrimination. Displacement in flower size has also been observed in the nightshade species Solanum grayi and S. lymholtzianum in sympatry as well as S. rostratum and S. citrullifolium.

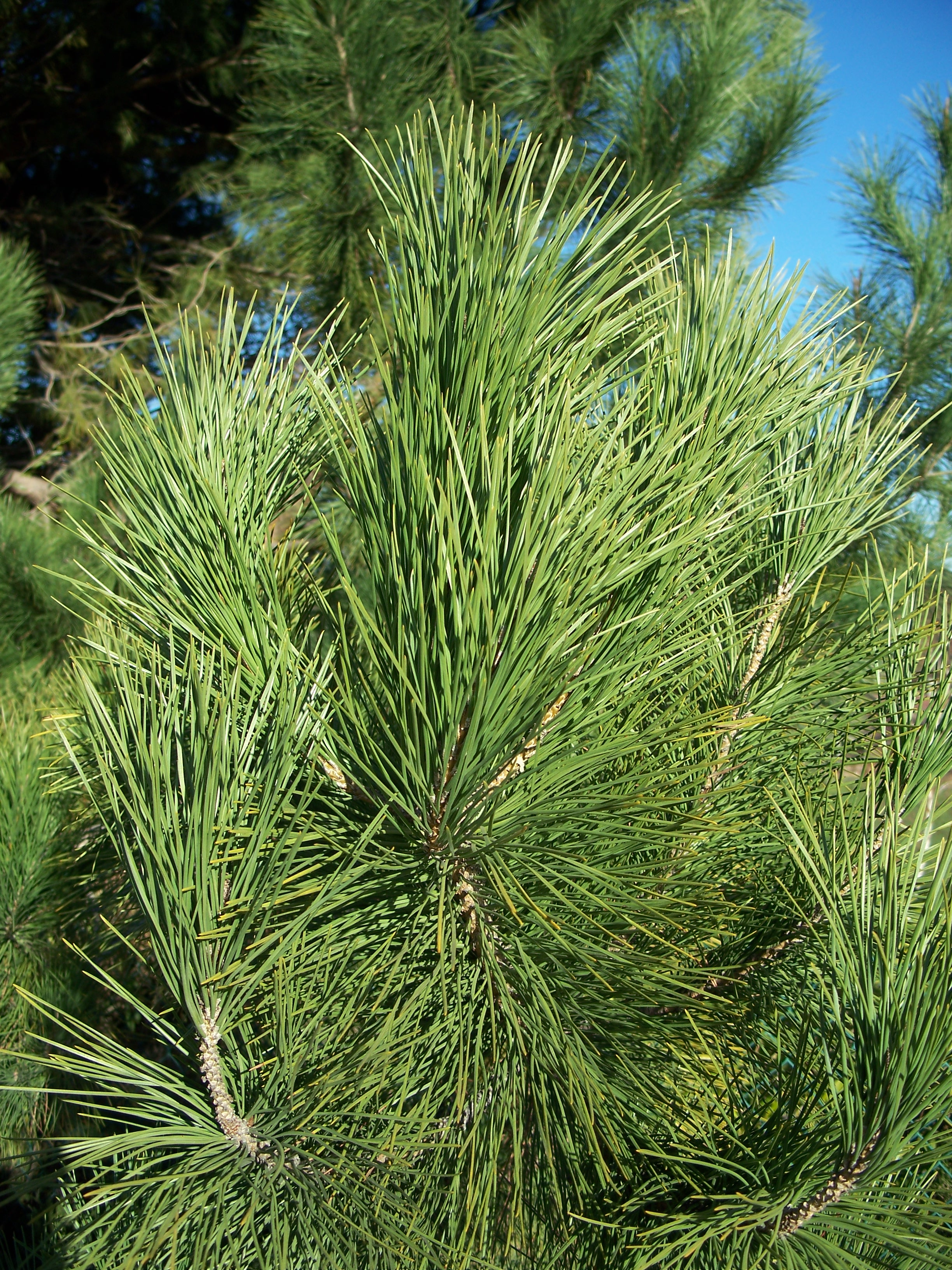
Green southern population foliage of Pinus muricata

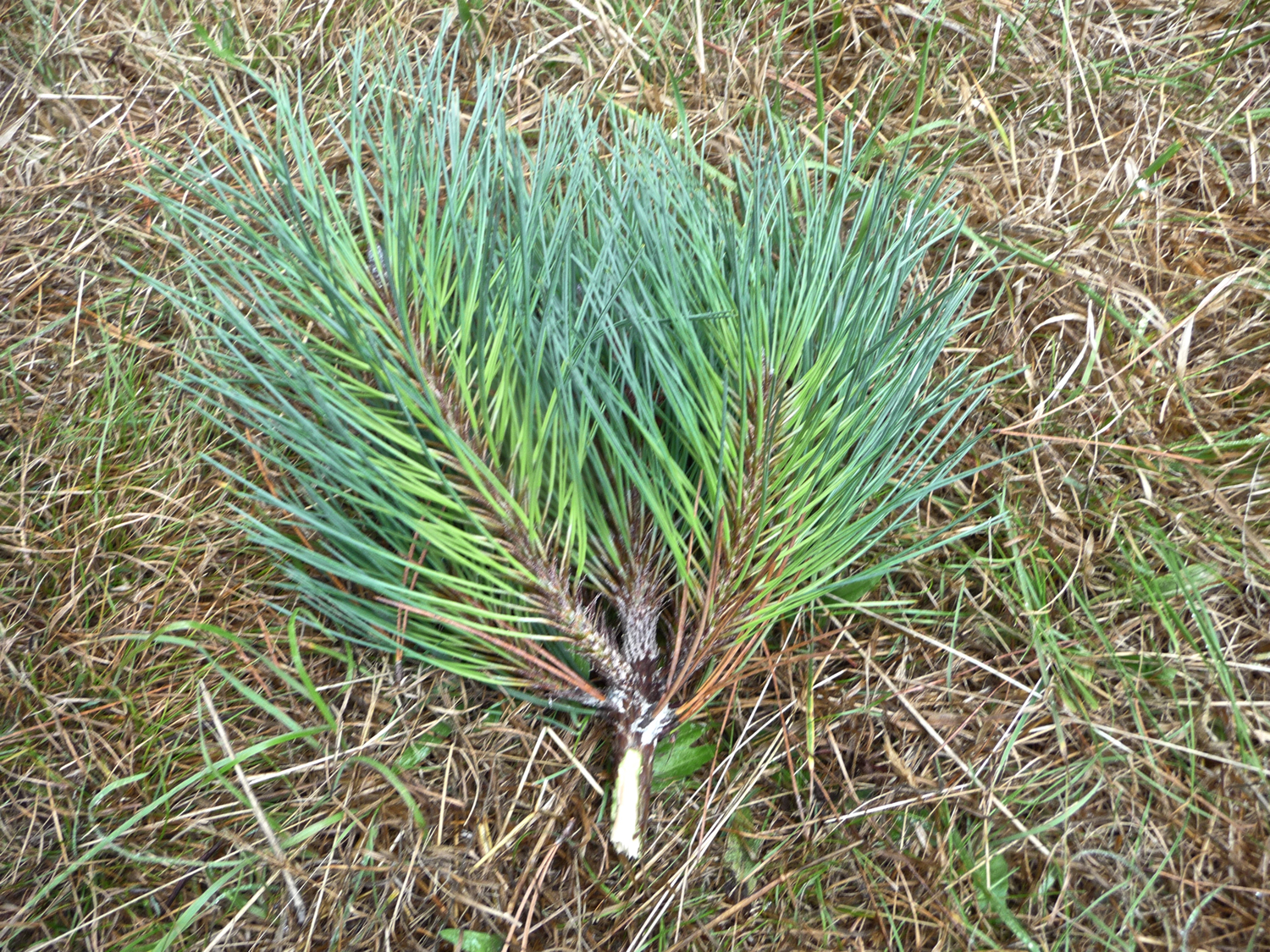
Blue northern population

The bishop pine is divided into two populations distinguished by monoterpene, stomata, and alloenzyme differences; flowering time; and needle color: blue foliage in the northern population and green foliage in the southern populations in California. A small region exists where the species meet in a cline—sustained by selection due to a flowering time divergence, thought to represent reinforcement taking place.

Similar patterns of both character displacement in sympatric populations of species have been documented in:

- Agrostis tenuis
- Anthoxanthum odoratum
- Gilia
- Costus plants: Costus allenii, C. laevis, and C. guanaiensis; C. pulverulentus and C. scaber
- A unique case of post-zygotic instead of prezygotic isolation has been observed in both Gossypium and Gilia, suggesting that in plants, post-zygotic isolation's role in reinforcement may play a larger role.
- Sympatric populations of Juncus effusus (common rush) exhibits genetic differentiation of plants that flower at different times preventing hybridization. Allochrony may play a role.

== Comparative studies ==
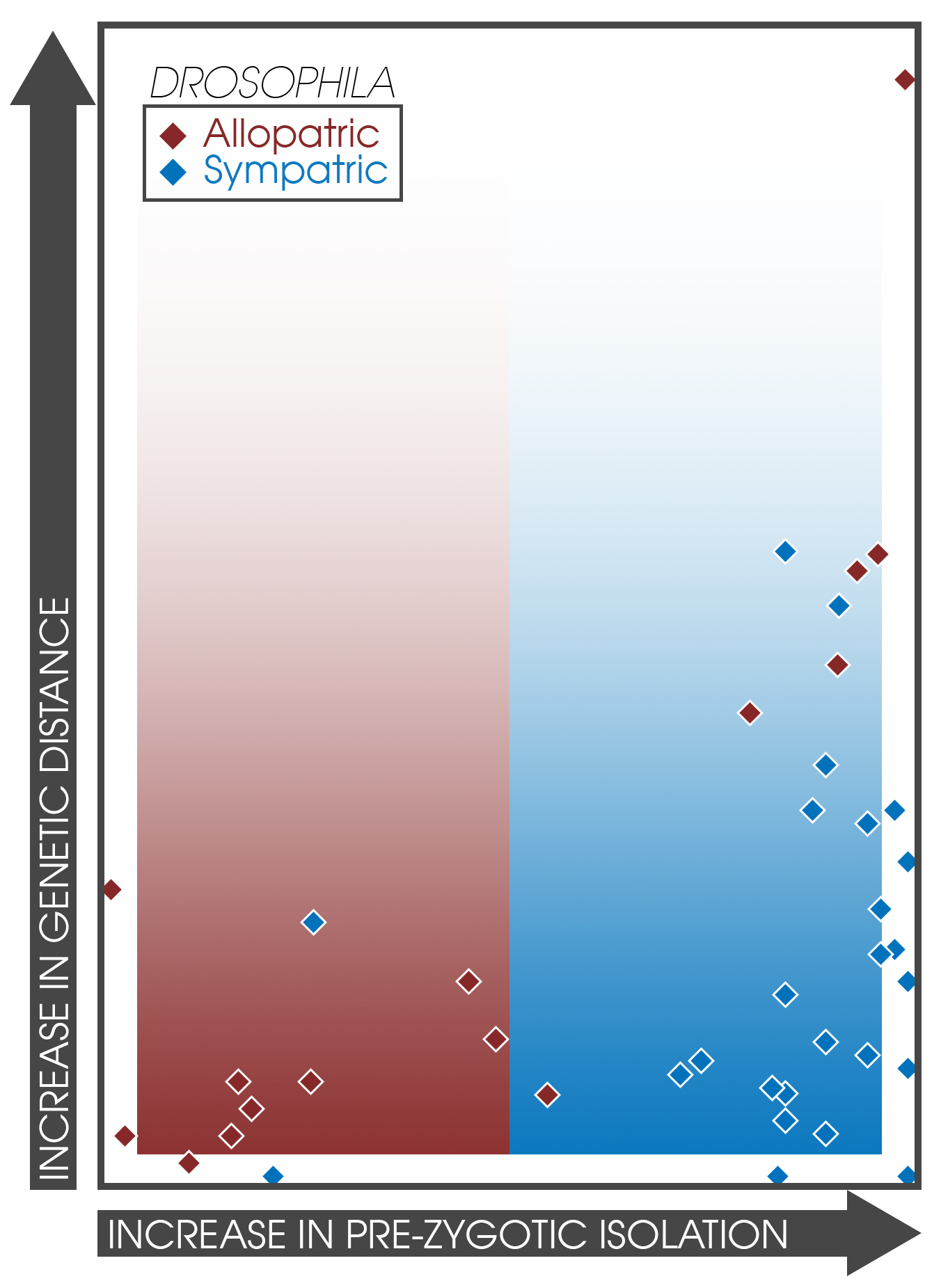
Prezygotic isolation in allopatric (red) and sympatric (blue) species pairs of Drosophila. Gradients indicate the predictions of reinforcement for allopatric and sympatric populations.

Assortive mating is expected to increase among sympatric populations experiencing reinforcement. This fact allows for the direct comparison of the strength of prezygotic isolation in sympatry and allopatry between different experiments and studies. Jerry Coyne and H. Allen Orr surveyed 171 species pairs, collecting data on their geographic mode, genetic distance, and strength of both prezygotic and post-zygotic isolation; finding that prezygotic isolation was significantly stronger in sympatric pairs, correlating with the ages of the species. Additionally, the strength of post-zygotic isolation was not different between sympatric and allopatric pairs.

This finding lends support the predictions of speciation by reinforcement and correlates well with another later study by Daniel J. Howard. In his study, 48 studies with observed reproductive character displacement (including plants, insects, crustaceans, molluscs, fish, amphibians, reptiles, birds, and mammals) were analyzed. The cases met several criteria such as the trait in question serving as a reproductive barrier and if there existed clear patterns of sympatry versus allopatry. Out of the 48 candidates, 69 percent (33 cases) found enhanced isolation in sympatry, suggesting that the pattern predicted by reinforcement is common in nature. In addition to Howard's comparative study, he guarded against the potential for positive-result publication bias by surveying 37 studies of hybrid zones. A prediction of reinforcement is that assortive mating should be common in hybrid zones; a prediction that was confirmed in 19 of the 37 cases.

A survey of the rates of speciation in fish and their associated hybrid zones found similar patterns in sympatry, supporting the occurrence of reinforcement. One study in the plants Glycine and Silene; however, did not find enhanced isolation.

== Laboratory experiments ==
Laboratory studies that explicitly test for reinforcement are limited. In general, two types of experiments have been conducted: using artificial selection to mimic natural selection that eliminates the hybrids (often called "destroy-the-hybrids"), and using disruptive selection to select for a trait (regardless of its function in sexual reproduction). Many experiments using the destroy-the-hybrids technique are generally cited as supportive of reinforcement; however, some researchers such as Coyne and Orr and William R. Rice and Ellen E. Hostert contend that they do not truly model reinforcement, as gene flow is completely restricted between two populations. The table below summarizes some of the laboratory experiments that are often cited as testing reinforcement in some form.

Table of laboratory studies of reinforcement
Species	Experimental design	Result	Year
D. paulistorum	Destroyed hybrids	Pre-zygotic isolation	1976
D.pseudoobscura & D. persimilis	Destroyed hybrids	Pre-zygotic isolation; reproductive character displacement	1950
D. melanogaster	Destroyed hybrids	Pre-zygotic isolation; reproductive character displacement	1974
D. melanogaster	Destroyed hybrids	Pre-zygotic isolation; reproductive character displacement	1956
D. melanogaster	Destroyed hybrids	No pre-zygotic isolation detected	1970
D. melanogaster	Destroyed hybrids	Pre-zygotic isolation	1953
D. melanogaster	Destroyed hybrids	Pre-zygotic isolation	1974
D. melanogaster	Allopatric populations in secondary contact	N/A	1982
D. melanogaster	Allopatric populations in secondary contact	N/A	1991
D. melanogaster	Allopatric populations in secondary contact	No pre-zygotic isolation detected	1966
D. melanogaster	Allowed gene flow between populations	No pre-zygotic isolation detected	1969
D. melanogaster	N/A	No pre-zygotic isolation detected	1984
D. melanogaster	Destroyed some hybrids	No pre-zygotic isolation detected	1983
D. melanogaster	Disruptive selection	Pre-zygotic isolation; assortive mating; all later replications of the experiment failed	1962
D. melanogaster	N/A	N/A	1997
D. melanogaster	Destroyed hybrids	Pre-zygotic isolation	1971
D. melanogaster	Destroyed hybrids	Pre-zygotic isolation	1973
D. melanogaster	Destroyed hybrids	Pre-zygotic isolation	1979
Zea mays	Destroyed hybrids	Pre-zygotic isolation; reproductive character displacement	1969
