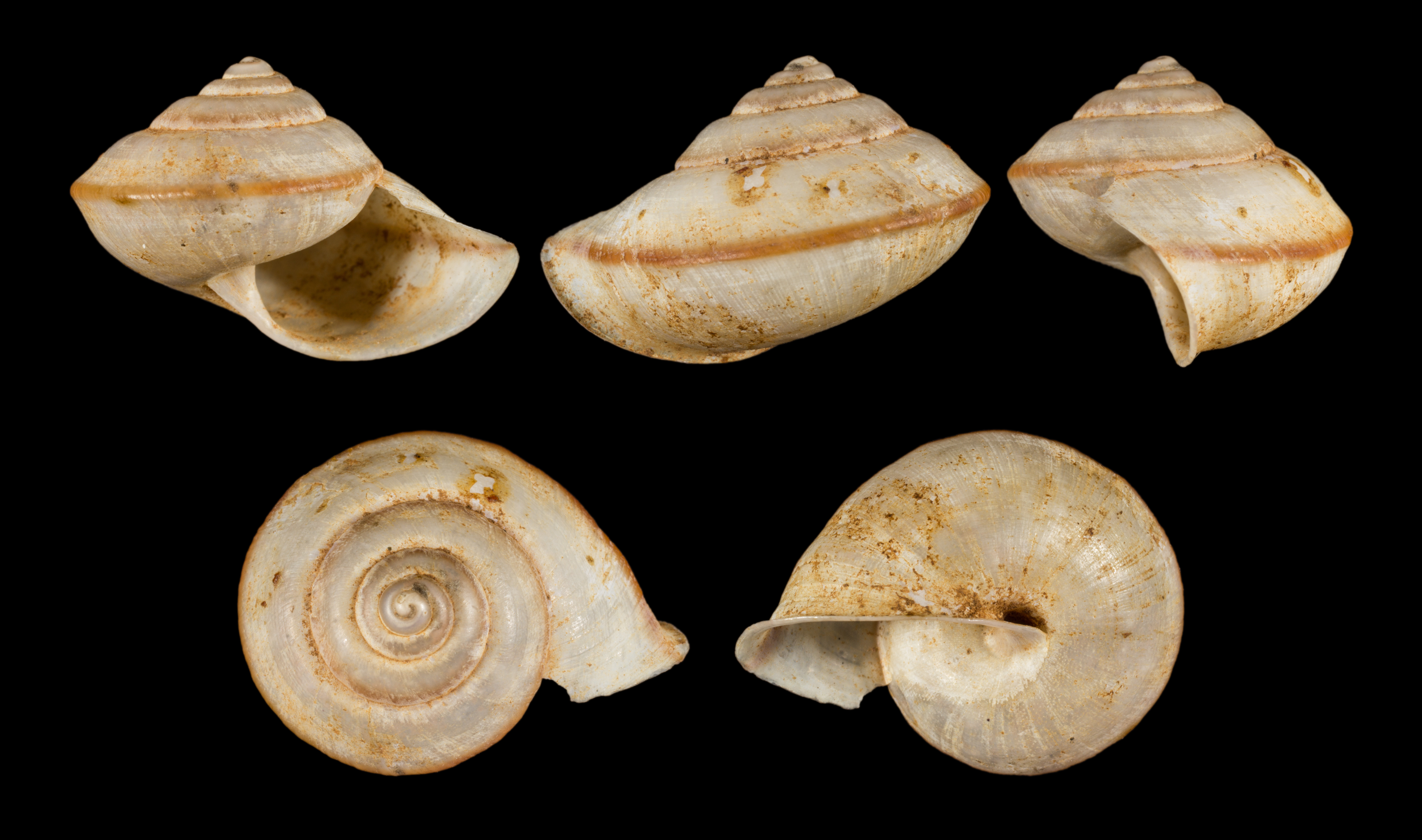
- Shell of Ganesella demangei (holotype at MNHN, Paris)

Scientific classification
- Kingdom: Animalia
- Phylum: Mollusca
- Class: Gastropoda
- Order: Stylommatophora
- Superfamily: Helicoidea
- Family: Camaenidae
- Subfamily: Camaeninae
- Genus: Ganesella; W. T. Blanford, 1863

Type species
- Helix capitium Benson, 1848

Synonyms
- Darwininitium Budha & Mordan, 2012 (junior synonym); Eulota (Ganesella) W. T. Blanford, 1863; Helix (Ganesella) W. T. Blanford, 1863 (original rank); Helix (Trochomorphoides) G. Nevill, 1878; Trochomorphoides G. Nevill, 1878

= Ganesella =

Genus of gastropods

Ganesella is a genus of air-breathing land snails, terrestrial pulmonate gastropod mollusks in the subfamily Camaeninae of the family Camaenidae.

== Species ==
Species within the genus Ganesella include:

- Ganesella acris (Benson, 1859)
- Ganesella aegistoides Yen, 1939
- Ganesella apex (Quadras & Möllendorff, 1896)
- Ganesella bantamensis (E. A. Smith, 1887)
- Ganesella bertiniana (Tapparone Canefri, 1880)
- Ganesella capitium (Benson, 1848)
- Ganesella carinella (Möllendorff, 1902)
- Ganesella catocyrta (Quadras & Möllendorff, 1895)
- Ganesella concavospira (Möllendorff, 1901)
- Ganesella conispira Yen, 1939
- Ganesella demangei (Dautzenberg & H. Fischer, 1907)
- Ganesella dormitans (Heude, 1882)
- Ganesella emma (L. Pfeiffer, 1863)
- Ganesella esau (Gredler, 1887)
- Ganesella eximia (Möllendorff, 1901)
- Ganesella fernandezi (Hidalgo, 1890)
- Ganesella fulvescens (Dautzenberg & H. Fischer, 1908)
- Ganesella gouldi (L. Pfeiffer, 1845)
- Ganesella halabalah Sutcharit & Panha, 2019
- Ganesella hariola (Benson, 1856)
- Ganesella huberi Thach, 2018
- Ganesella hyperteleia (Morlet, 1892)
- Ganesella infrastriata (E. A. Smith, 1884)
- Ganesella lepidostola (Heude, 1882)
- Ganesella leptopomopsis (Dautzenberg & H. Fischer, 1908)
- † Ganesella martini Oostingh 1935
- Ganesella microbembix Haas, 1935
- Ganesella microtrochus (Möllendorff, 1887)
- Ganesella modesta I. Rensch, 1931
- Ganesella oxytropis (Möllendorff, 1901)
- Ganesella palananica (Quadras & Möllendorff, 1896)
- Ganesella papuana Thiele, 1928
- Ganesella perakensis (Crosse, 1879)
- Ganesella phonica (Mabille, 1887)
- Ganesella planasi (Hidalgo, 1890)
- Ganesella platyconus (Möllendorff, 1901)
- Ganesella poecilotrochus (Möllendorff, 1894)
- Ganesella procera Gude, 1902
- Ganesella producta (Dautzenberg & H. Fischer, 1908)
- Ganesella rostrella (L. Pfeiffer, 1863)
- Ganesella rufofilosa (Bock, 1881)
- Ganesella saurivonga (Bavay & Dautzenberg, 1900)
- Ganesella schomburgiana (Möllendorff, 1884)
- Ganesella sitalina (Gredler, 1887)
- Ganesella sphaerotrochus Vermeulen, 1996
- Ganesella squamulina (Gredler, 1884)
- Ganesella stenodesma (Quadras & Möllendorff, 1896)
- Ganesella straminea (Möllendorff, 1901)
- Ganesella subflava (Godwin-Austen, 1891)
- Ganesella subsquamulata (Heude, 1890)
- Ganesella substraminea (Bavay & Dautzenberg, 1909)
- Ganesella subtrochus Yen, 1939
- Ganesella ternaria (Heude, 1890)
- Ganesella thachi F. Huber, 2018
- Ganesella thoracica (Heude, 1882)
- Ganesella tigaensis (Godwin-Austen, 1891)
- Ganesella trochacea (Gredler, 1885)
- Ganesella trochus (Möllendorff, 1887)
- Ganesella vatheleti (Bavay & Dautzenberg, 1899)
- Ganesella virilis (Gredler, 1887)

Species brought into synonymy

- Ganesella adelinae Pilsbry, 1902 : synonym of Satsuma (Luchuhadra) adelinae (Pilsbry, 1902) represented as Satsuma adelinae (Pilsbry, 1902) (original combination)
- Ganesella albida (H. Adams, 1870) : synonym of Satsuma albida (H. Adams, 1870)
- Ganesella batanica (A. Adams & Reeve, 1850) : synonym of Pancala batanica (A. Adams & Reeve, 1850) : synonym of Satsuma (Coniglobus) batanica (A. Adams & Reeve, 1850) represented as Satsuma batanica (A. Adams & Reeve, 1850) (unaccepted combination)
- Ganesella brevibarbis (L. Pfeiffer, 1859) : synonym of Plectotropis brevibarbis (L. Pfeiffer, 1859) (unaccepted combination)
- Ganesella cardiostoma (Kobelt, 1879) : synonym of Satsuma cardiostoma (Kobelt, 1879) (unaccepted combination)
- Ganesella citrina Zilch, 1940 : synonym of Satsuma mellea stenozona (Möllendorff, 1884) represented as Satsuma mellea (L. Pfeiffer, 1866) (junior synonym)
- Ganesella coudeini (Bavay & Dautzenberg, 1900) : synonym of Aegista coudeini (Bavay & Dautzenberg, 1900)
- Ganesella cristata Pilsbry, 1902 : synonym of Satsuma cristata (Pilsbry, 1902) (original combination)
- Ganesella erabuana Kuroda, 1958 : synonym of Satsuma eucosmia erabuana (Kuroda, 1958) (original combination)
- Ganesella fausta Pilsbry, 1902 : synonym of Satsuma fausta (Pilsbry, 1902) (original combination)
- Ganesella ferruginea Pilsbry, 1900 : synonym of Satsuma ferruginea (Pilsbry, 1900) (original combination)
- Ganesella galea (Benson, 1859) : synonym of Sesara galea (Benson, 1859)
- Ganesella jacobii Pilsbry, 1900 : synonym of Satsuma jacobii (Pilsbry, 1900) (original combination)
- Ganesella japonica (L. Pfeiffer, 1847) : synonym of Satsuma (Satsuma) japonica (L. Pfeiffer, 1847) represented as Satsuma japonica (L. Pfeiffer, 1847)
- Ganesella kanamarui Hirase, 1909 : synonym of Satsuma kanamarui (Hirase, 1909) (original combination)
- Ganesella lamyi (Dautzenberg & H. Fischer, 1905) : synonym of Ganesella emma (L. Pfeiffer, 1863) (junior synonym)
- Ganesella largillierti (L. Pfeiffer, 1849) : synonym of Satsuma largillierti (L. Pfeiffer, 1849) (unaccepted generic combination)
- Ganesella moellendorffiana Pilsbry & Hirase, 1903 : synonym of Satsuma moellendorffiana (Pilsbry & Hirase, 1903) (original combination)
- Ganesella murensis Cockerell, 1926 : synonym of Bradybaena virgo (Pilsbry, 1927) (junior synonym)
- Ganesella myomphala (Martens, 1865) : synonym of Satsuma myomphala (Martens, 1865)
- Ganesella notoensis Pilsbry & Y. Hirase, 1903 : synonym of Satsuma papilliformis (Kobelt, 1875) (junior synonym)
- Ganesella nux (Möllendorff, 1888) : synonym of Satsuma nux (Möllendorff, 1888) (unaccepted combination)
- Ganesella optima Pilsbry, 1902 : synonym of Trishoplita optima (Pilsbry, 1902) (original combination)
- Ganesella polygyrata van Benthem Jutting, 1933 : synonym of Coxia polygyrata (van Benthem Jutting, 1933) (original combination)
- Ganesella rhombostoma (L. Pfeiffer, 1861) : synonym of Anceyoconcha rhombostoma (L. Pfeiffer, 1861) (unaccepted combination)
- Ganesella satsuma Pilsbry, 1900 : synonym of Satsuma japonica satsuma (Pilsbry, 1900) (original combination and rank)
- Ganesella selasia Pilsbry, 1902 : synonym of Satsuma selasia (Pilsbry, 1902)
- Ganesella sororcula Pilsbry, 1902 : synonym of Satsuma sororcula (Pilsbry, 1902) (original combination)
- Ganesella stearnsii Pilsbry, 1895 : synonym of Satsuma papilliformis (Kobelt, 1875) (junior synonym)
- Ganesella tanegashimae Pilsbry, 1901 : synonym of Satsuma tanegashimae (Pilsbry, 1901) (original combination)
- Ganesella thaanumi Pilsbry, 1924 : synonym of Satsuma moellendorffiana thaanumi (Pilsbry, 1924) (original combination)
- Ganesella tokunoshimana Pilsbry & Hirase, 1904 : synonym of Satsuma (Luchuhadra) tokunoshimana (Pilsbry & Hirase, 1904) represented as Satsuma tokunoshimana (Pilsbry & Hirase, 1904) (original combination)
- Ganesella turrita Gude, 1900 : synonym of Pseudobuliminus turrita (Gude, 1900) (original combination)
- Ganesella virgo Pilsbry, 1927 : synonym of Bradybaena virgo (Pilsbry, 1927) (original combination)
- Ganesella weiskei Fulton, 1902 : synonym of Paratrochus weiskei (Fulton, 1902) (original combination)
