= Character displacement =

Differentiation of similar species in the same region

Character displacement occurs when similar species that live in the same geographical region and occupy similar niches differentiate in order to minimize niche overlap and avoid competitive exclusion. Several species of Galapagos finches display character displacement. Each closely related species differs in beak size and beak depth, allowing them to coexist in the same region since each species eats a different type of seed: the seed best fit for its unique beak. The finches with the deeper, stronger beaks consume large, tough seeds, while the finches with smaller beaks consume the smaller, softer seeds.

Character displacement is the phenomenon where differences among similar species whose distributions overlap geographically are accentuated in regions where the species co-occur, but are minimized or lost where the species' distributions do not overlap. This pattern results from evolutionary change driven by biological competition among species for a limited resource (e.g. food). The rationale for character displacement stems from the competitive exclusion principle, also called Gause's Law, which contends that to coexist in a stable environment two competing species must differ in their respective ecological niche; without differentiation, one species will eliminate or exclude the other through competition.

Character displacement was first explicitly explained by William L. Brown Jr. and E. O. Wilson in 1956: "Two closely related species have overlapping ranges. In the parts of the ranges where one species occurs alone, the populations of that species are similar to the other species and may even be very difficult to distinguish from it. In the area of overlap, where the two species occur together, the populations are more divergent and easily distinguished, i.e., they 'displace' one another in one or more characters. The characters involved can be morphological, ecological, behavioral, or physiological; they are assumed to be genetically based."

Brown and Wilson used the term character displacement to refer to instances of both reproductive character displacement, or reinforcement of reproductive barriers, and ecological character displacement driven by competition. As the term character displacement is commonly used, it generally refers to morphological differences due to competition. Brown and Wilson viewed character displacement as a phenomenon involved in speciation, stating, "we believe that it is a common aspect of geographical speciation, arising most often as a product of the genetic and ecological interaction of two (or more) newly evolved, cognate species [derived from the same immediate parental species] during their period of first contact." While character displacement is important in various scenarios of speciation, including adaptive radiations like the cichlid fish faunas in the rift lakes of East Africa, it also plays an important role in structuring communities. It also plays a role in speciation by reinforcement in such that allopatric populations overlapping in sympatry exhibit greater trait divergence. The results of numerous studies contribute evidence that character displacement often influences the evolution of resource acquisition among members of an ecological guild.

Competitive release, defined as the expansion of an ecological niche in the absence of a competitor, is essentially the mirror image of character displacement. It too was described by Brown and Wilson: "Two closely related species are distinct where they occur together, but where one member of the pair occurs alone it converges toward the second, even to the extent of being nearly identical with it in some characters."

== Conceptual development ==
"Character displacement is the situation in which, when two species of animals overlap geographically, the differences between them are accentuated in the zone of sympatry and weakened or lost entirely in the parts of their ranges outside this zone". While the term "ecological character displacement" first appeared in the scientific literature in 1956, the idea has earlier roots. For example, Joseph Grinnell, in the classic paper that set forth the concept of the ecological niche, stated, "It is, of course, axiomatic that no two species regularly established in a single fauna have precisely the same niche requirements." The existence of character displacement is evidence that the two species do not completely overlap in their niche requirement.

Following the dissemination of the concept, character displacement was viewed as an important force in structuring ecological communities, and biologists identified numerous examples. During the late 1970s and early 1980s, however, the role of competition and character displacement in structuring communities was questioned and its importance greatly downgraded. Many found the early examples unconvincing and suggested it to be a rare phenomenon. Criticisms with earlier studies included the lack of rigor in statistical analyses and the use of poorly rationalized characters. Additionally, theory seemed to indicate that the conditions that allowed character displacement to occur were limited. This scrutiny helped motivate theoretical and methodological advances as well as the development of a more rigorous framework for testing character displacement.

Six criteria have been developed to establish character displacement as the mechanism for differences between sympatric species. These include: (1) differences between sympatric taxa are greater than expected by chance; (2) differences in character states are related to differences in resource use; (3) resources are limiting, and interspecific competition for these resources is a function of character similarity; (4) resource distribution are the same in sympatry and allopatry such that differences in character states are not due to differences in resource availability; (5) differences must have evolved in situ; (6) differences must be genetically based. Rigorously testing these criteria necessitates a synthetic approach, combining areas of research like community ecology, functional morphology, adaptation, quantitative genetics and phylogenetic systematics, While satisfying all six criteria in a single study of character displacement is not often feasible, they provide the necessary context for researching character displacement.

Character displacement has indicated to be a major factor in beak size among finches located in the Galápagos Islands and Hawaiian Islands.

== Examples ==
Studies have been performed in a wide variety of taxa—a few groups having disproportionately contributed to the understanding of character displacement: mammalian carnivores, Galapagos finches, anole lizards on islands, three-spined stickleback fish, and snails.

=== Birds ===
In the initial explication of character displacement, many of the examples set forth as potential evidence for character displacement were observations between multiple pairs of birds. These included eastern and western rock nuthatches in southwest Asia, Australian honeyeaters of the genus Myzantha, Australian parrots, shearwaters in the Cape Verde Islands, flycatchers of the Bismarck Archipelago and notably, Darwin's finches in the Galapagos. David Lack found that when the two species Geospiza fortis and G. fuliginosa occurred on large islands together, they could be distinguished unequivocally by beak size. When either one occurred by itself on a smaller island, however, the beak size was intermediate in size relative to when the two co-occurred. Similarly, Peter and Rosemary Grant found that a Geospiza fortis island population diverged in beak size (due to high mortality) from competitor G. magnirostris in a year with low food supply, apparently due to increased competition for larger seeds that both species fed on. Most character displacement studies focus on morphological differences in feeding apparatus rather than on those relating to habitat use. However, comparisons of micro-habitat use and morphological adaptations of Western and Eastern Rock Nuthatches indicate that these two species show spatial niche segregation in addition to trophic niche segregation.

It is often assumed that closely related species are more likely to compete than are more distantly related species, and hence many researchers investigate character displacement among species in the same genus. While character displacement was originally discussed in the context of very closely related species, evidence suggests that even interactions among distantly related species can result in character displacement. Finches and bees in the Galapagos provide support for this. Two finch species (Geospiza fuliginosa and G. difficilis) exploit more flower nectar on islands where the lager carpenter bee (Xylocopa darwini) is absent than on islands with the bees. Individual finches that harvest nectar are smaller than members of the same species that do not. A coexistence study of four Finches such as the ground Finch (Geospiza spp), the tree Finch (Camarhynchus spp), the vegetarian Finch (Platyspiza crassirostris) and the warbler Finch (Certhidia spp) showed that when competition is initially low, species might coexist even without character displacement. Many studies have measured niche (often seen in diet) overlap between closely related species, sometimes finding strong niche divergence; seen even in broad niche overlaps. The specific periods of diet divergence are seen as the main cause of adaptive divergence in morphology and performance of a bird species; which can be connected to periods of scarcity. Between the sets of Finches there was low competition. These results are due to correlation between the vast differences in diet coupled with large and adaptive differences in beak morphology. However, with similar levels of Finch phylogeny showed ongoing divergence, diet overlap and competition.

=== Reptiles ===
The lizard genus Anolis on the islands in the Caribbean has also been the subject of numerous studies investigating the role of competition and character displacement in community structure. Lesser Antilles islands can only support Anolis species of different sizes, and the relative importance of character displacement versus size at colonization in determining invasion success has been explored and debated.

=== Amphibians ===
The Appalachian salamanders Plethodon hoffmani and P. cinereus display no morphological differences, eating habits, or resource use exploitation differences among allopatric populations; when the species occurs in sympatry; however, they exhibit morphological differentiation that is associated with segregation in prey size. Where these two species co-occur, P. hoffmani has a faster closing jaw required for larger prey, and P. cinereus has a slower, stronger jaw for smaller prey. Other studies have found Plethodon salamander species that demonstrate character displacement from aggressive behavioral interference rather than exploitation. That is, morphological character displacement between the two species is due to aggressive interaction between them rather than the exploitation of different food resources.

=== Molluscs ===
On Okinawa Island, the snail species Satsuma largillierti lives on the eastern half of the island, while Satsuma eucosmia lives on the western half. Both populations overlap in sympatry along the middle of the island, where the penis length of the species differs significantly where they meet in sympatry. The snails' penis lengths exhibit divergence, suggesting reproductive character displacement of this trait.

=== Fish ===
Threespine sticklebacks (Gasterosteus spp.) in post-glacial lakes in western Canada have contributed significantly to recent research of character displacement. Both observations of natural populations and manipulative experiments show that when two recently evolved species occur in a single lake, two morphologies are selected for: a limnetic form that feeds in open water and a benthic form that feeds at the lake bottom. They differ in size, shape and the number and length of gill rakers, all of which is related to divergence in their diet. Hybrids between the two forms are selected against. When only one species inhabits a lake, that fish displays an intermediate morphology. Studies on other fish species have shown similar patterns of selection for benthic and limnetic morphologies, which can also lead to sympatric speciation.

=== Mammals ===
Introduced species have also provided recent "natural experiments" to investigate how rapidly character displacement can affect evolutionary change. When American mink (Mustela vison) were introduced in north-eastern Belarus, the native European mink (Mustela lutreola) increased in size, and the introduced mink decreased in size. This displacement was observed within a ten-year study, demonstrating that competition can drive rapid evolutionary change.

== See also ==
- Evidence for speciation by reinforcement
- Niche segregation
- Sexual conflict
