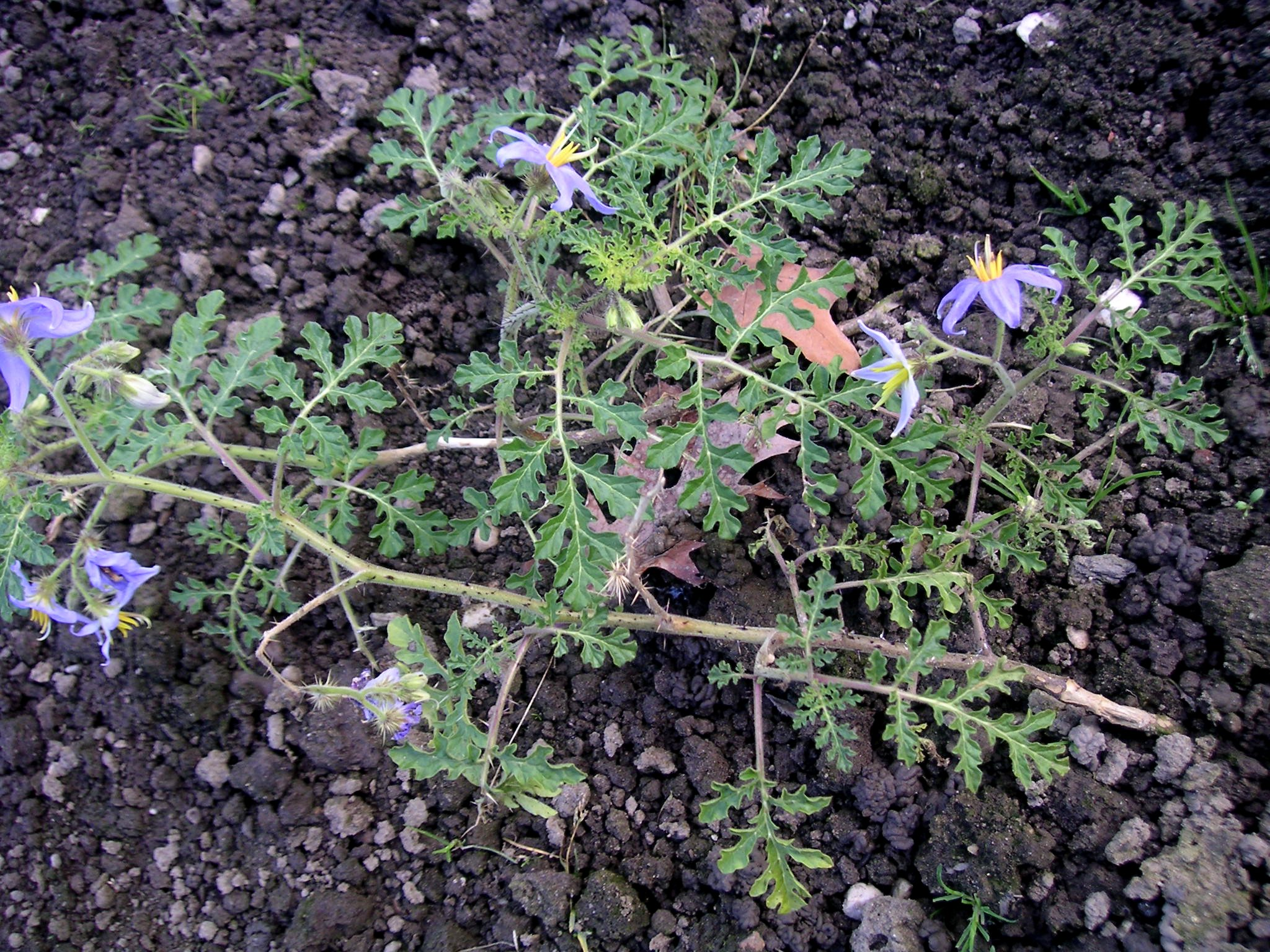

Scientific classification
- Kingdom: Plantae
- Clade: Tracheophytes
- Clade: Angiosperms
- Clade: Eudicots
- Clade: Asterids
- Order: Solanales
- Family: Solanaceae
- Genus: Solanum
- Species: S. citrullifolium

Binomial name
- Solanum citrullifolium A.Braun

Synonyms
- Nycterium citrullifolium (A.Braun) Nieuwl.

= Solanum citrullifolium =

Watermelon nightshade

Species of plant in the nightshade family

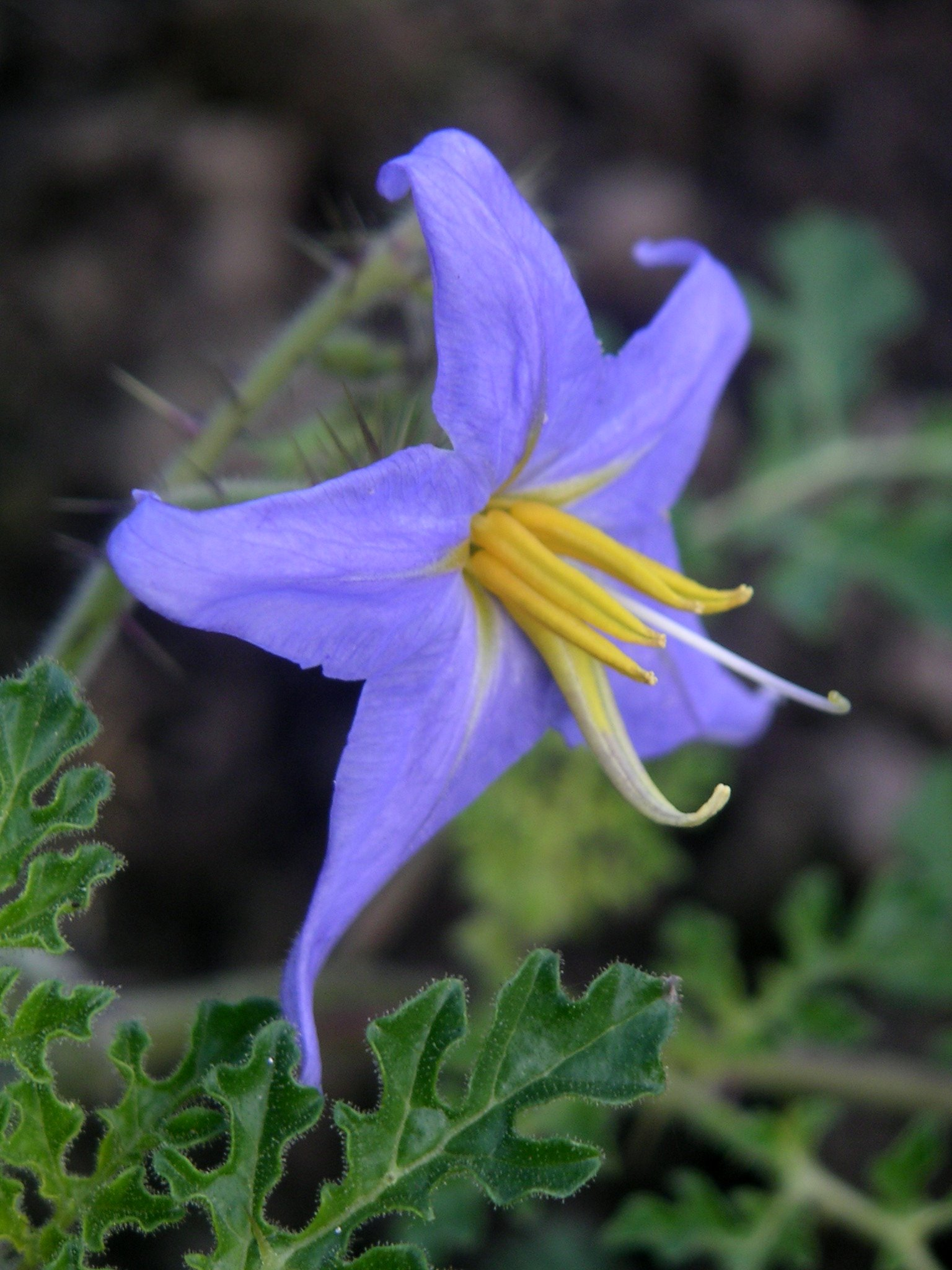
Closeup of flower

Solanum citrullifolium is a species of flowering plant in the Solanaceae family. It is a nightshade referred to by the common name watermelon nightshade, as its leaves somewhat resemble those of a watermelon plant. It is a white-stemmed shrub with purple star-shaped flowers. It is native to the southern United States and it is grown in home gardens as an ornamental plant.

Not to be confused with the similarly-named "melonleaf nightshade", which is a different species, S. heterodoxum.

== Footnotes ==
- Solanaceae Source (2004): – Solanum citrullifolium. Version of August 2004. Retrieved 2008-SEP-25.
