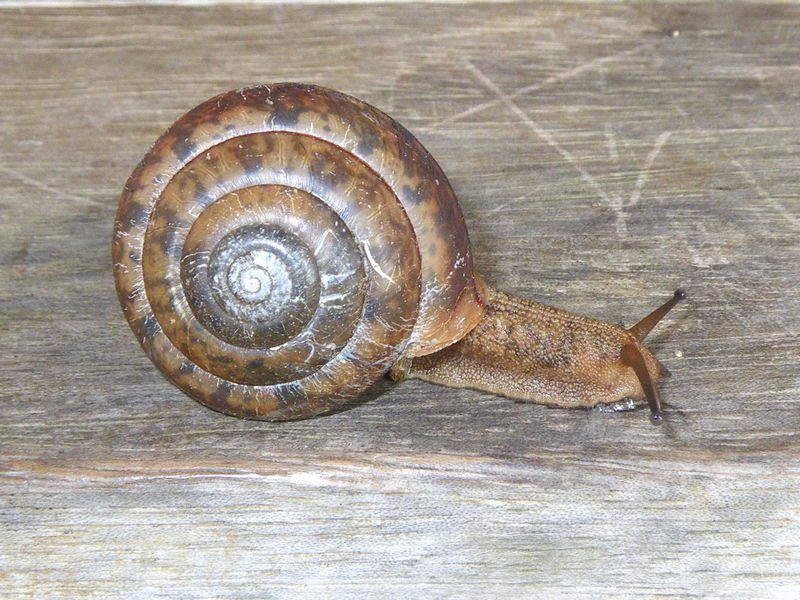

Scientific classification
- Domain: Eukaryota
- Kingdom: Animalia
- Phylum: Mollusca
- Class: Gastropoda
- Order: Stylommatophora
- Superfamily: Helicoidea
- Family: Camaenidae
- Subfamily: Bradybaeninae
- Genus: Satsuma; Adams, 1868

Type species
- Helix japonica L. Pfeiffer, 1847

Synonyms
- List: Coniglobus Pilsbry & Y. Hirase, 1906; Eulota (Coniglobus) Pilsbry & Y. Hirase, 1906; Fruticotrochus Kobelt, 1879; Ganesella (Coniglobus) Pilsbry & Y. Hirase, 1906; Ganesella (Satsuma) A. Adams, 1868; Helix (Fruticotrochus) Kobelt, 1879; Helix (Satsuma) A. Adams, 1868; Luchuhadra Kuroda & Habe, 1949; Satsuma (Coniglobus) Pilsbry & Y. Hirase, 1906· accepted, alternate representation; Satsuma (Luchuhadra) Kuroda & Habe, 1949· accepted, alternate representation; Satsuma (Satsuma) A. Adams, 1868

= Satsuma (gastropod) =

Genus of gastropods

Satsuma is a genus of air-breathing land snails, terrestrial pulmonate gastropod mollusks in the tribe Aegistini of the subfamily Bradybaeninae in the family Camaenidae.

== Distribution ==
Satsuma species can primarily be found in Japan, as well as China. It also exists in Vietnam, Guam, and the Philippines, as well as Indonesia and Hong Kong.

== Species ==
The following species are recognised in the genus Satsuma:

- Satsuma abletti Thach & F. Huber, 2021
- Satsuma adelinae (Pilsbry, 1902)
- Satsuma adiriensis C.-C. Hwang & S.-P. Wu, 2018
- Satsuma akiratadai Kameda & H. Fukuda, 2015
- Satsuma albida (H. Adams, 1870) (accepted > unreplaced junior homonym)
- Satsuma amanoi Kuroda, 1960
- Satsuma ammiralis (L. Pfeiffer, 1857)
- Satsuma arisana (Kuroda, 1941)
- Satsuma auratibasis S.-P. Wu, C.-C. Hwang & Y.-S. Lin, 2008
- Satsuma bacca (L. Pfeiffer, 1866)
- Satsuma backeljaui Thach & F. Huber, 2021
- Satsuma bairdi (H. Adams, 1866)
- Satsuma caliginosa (A. Adams & Reeve, 1850)
- Satsuma cardiostoma (Kobelt, 1879)
- Satsuma careocaecum S.-P. Wu, C.-C. Hwang & Y.-S. Lin, 2008
- Satsuma chengi S.-P. Wu & C.-L. Tsai, 2015
- Satsuma contraria (Pilsbry & Hirase, 1909)
- Satsuma cristata (Pilsbry, 1902)
- Satsuma danzyoensis (Kuroda, 1973)
- Satsuma eucosmia (Pilsbry, 1895)
- Satsuma fausta (Pilsbry, 1902)
- Satsuma ferruginea (Pilsbry, 1900)
- Satsuma formosensis (L. Pfeiffer, 1866)
- Satsuma friesiana (Möllendorff, 1884)
- Satsuma fusca (Gude, 1900)
- Satsuma guandi L.-J. Zhang, Y.-J. Zhu & Z.-T. Lyu, 2020
- Satsuma hagiomontis S.-P. Wu, C.-C. Hwang & Y.-S. Lin, 2008
- Satsuma hemihelvus Minato, 1980
- Satsuma hsuehshan C.-C. Hwang & S.-P. Wu, 2024
- Satsuma huberi S.-P. Wu, C.-C. Hwang & Y.-S. Lin, 2008
- Satsuma iheyaensis (Pilsbry & Y. Hirase, 1905)
- Satsuma insignis (Pilsbry & Hirase, 1906)
- Satsuma jacobii (Pilsbry, 1900)
- Satsuma japonica (L. Pfeiffer, 1847)
- Satsuma jinlunensis C.-C. Hwang, Okubo & Tada, 2017
- Satsuma kanamarui (Y. Hirase, 1909)
- Satsuma kanoi S.-P. Wu, C.-C. Hwang & Y.-S. Lin, 2008
- Satsuma katipolensis S.-P. Wu, C.-C. Hwang & Y.-S. Lin, 2008
- Satsuma laeva (Pilsbry & Y. Hirase, 1908)
- Satsuma largillierti (L. Pfeiffer, 1849)
- Satsuma lepidophora Minato, 2006
- Satsuma lewisii (E. A. Smith, 1878)
- Satsuma lini S.-P. Wu, C.-C. Hwang & Y.-S. Lin, 2008
- Satsuma litus (K.-M. Chang & Tada, 2000)
- Satsuma longkiauwensis S.-P. Wu, Y.-S. Lin & C.-C. Hwang, 2007
- Satsuma luteolella S.-P. Wu, C.-C. Hwang & Y.-S. Lin, 2008
- Satsuma mellea (L. Pfeiffer, 1866)
- Satsuma mercatoria (L. Pfeiffer, 1845)
- Satsuma meridionalis (Möllendorff, 1884)
- Satsuma mii S.-P. Wu & C.-C. Wu, 2017
- Satsuma mimiwui S.-P. Wu & C.-C. Wu, 2017
- Satsuma moellendorffiana (Pilsbry & Y. Hirase, 1903)
- Satsuma mollicula (Pilsbry & Hirase, 1909)
- Satsuma myomphala (E. von Martens, 1865)
- Satsuma nakayamai Kuroda & Minato, 1975
- Satsuma nivnu C.-C. Hwang & S.-P. Wu, 2024
- Satsuma nux (Möllendorff, 1888)
- Satsuma okiensis (Pilsbry & Y. Hirase, 1908)
- Satsuma omoro Minato, 1982
- Satsuma omphalodes (Pilsbry, 1901)
- Satsuma pagodula (Ehrmann, 1900)
- Satsuma paiwanis (Kuroda, 1941)
- Satsuma papilliformis (Kobelt, 1875)
- Satsuma paradoxa S.-P. Wu & C.-L. Tsai, 2016
- Satsuma pekanensis (H. Rolle, 1911)
- Satsuma perversa (Pilsbry, 1931)
- Satsuma phoenicis S.-P. Wu, C.-C. Hwang & Y.-S. Lin, 2008
- Satsuma pilsbryi S.-P. Wu, C.-C. Hwang & Y.-S. Lin, 2008
- Satsuma polymorpha S.-P. Wu, C.-C. Hwang & Y.-S. Lin, 2008
- Satsuma rubrolaeva C.-C. Hwang & K.-M. Chang, 2008
- Satsuma rugosa Kuroda & Minato, 1981
- Satsuma sadamii Kuroda & Minato, 1975
- Satsuma selasia (Pilsbry, 1902)
- Satsuma sericata (Kuroda, 1941)
- Satsuma shigetai Minato, 1984
- Satsuma sororcula (Pilsbry, 1902)
- Satsuma sphaeroconus (L. Pfeiffer, 1866)
- Satsuma squamigera C.-C. Hwang & S.-P. Wu, 2018
- Satsuma succincta (H. Adams, 1866)
- Satsuma sunlinksea C.-C. Hwang & S.-P. Wu, 2024
- Satsuma swinhoei S.-P. Wu, C.-C. Hwang & Y.-S. Lin, 2008
- Satsuma tadai Kuroda, 1960
- Satsuma takahasii (Kuroda, 1941)
- Satsuma takkiriensis (Kuroda, 1941)
- Satsuma tanegashimae (Pilsbry, 1901)
- Satsuma tani (Kuroda, 1941)
- Satsuma textilis (Pilsbry & Hirase, 1904)
- Satsuma thachi F. Huber, 2018
- Satsuma tokunoshimana (Pilsbry & Hirase, 1904)
- Satsuma uncopila (Heude, 1882)
- Satsuma vallis S.-P. Wu, C.-C. Hwang & Y.-S. Lin, 2008
- Satsuma viridibasis S.-P. Wu, C.-C. Hwang & Y.-S. Lin, 2008
- Satsuma wenshini S.-P. Wu & C.-L. Tsai, 2014
- Satsuma wiegmanniana (Pilsbry, 1901)
- Satsuma yaeyamensis (Pilsbry, 1894)
