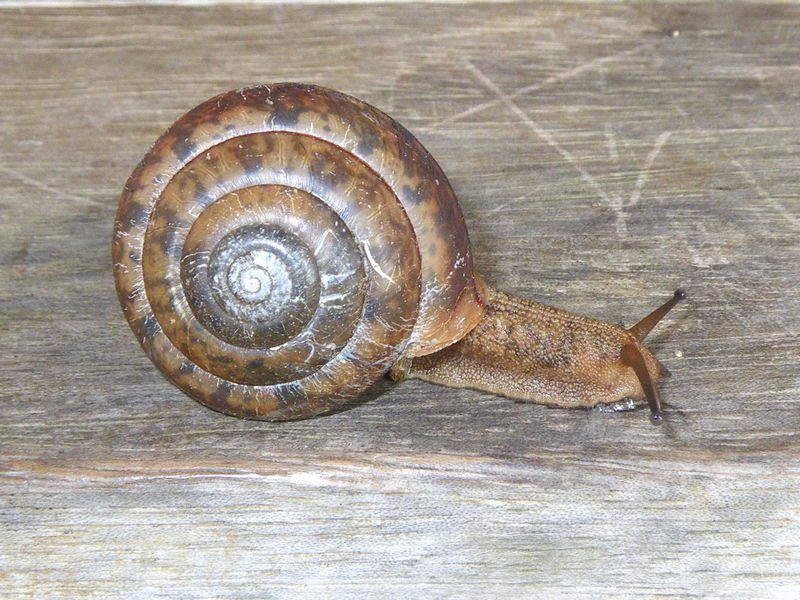
- Snail tentatively identified as Satsuma myomphala

Scientific classification
- Domain: Eukaryota
- Kingdom: Animalia
- Phylum: Mollusca
- Class: Gastropoda
- Order: Stylommatophora
- Family: Camaenidae
- Genus: Satsuma
- Species: S. myomphala

Binomial name
- Satsuma myomphala (Martens, 1865)

= Satsuma myomphala =

Species of gastropod

Satsuma myomphala, in Japanese: Kobeso-Maimai (コベソマイマイ), is a species of air-breathing land snail, a terrestrial pulmonate gastropod mollusk in the family Camaenidae. This species is found in Japan.
