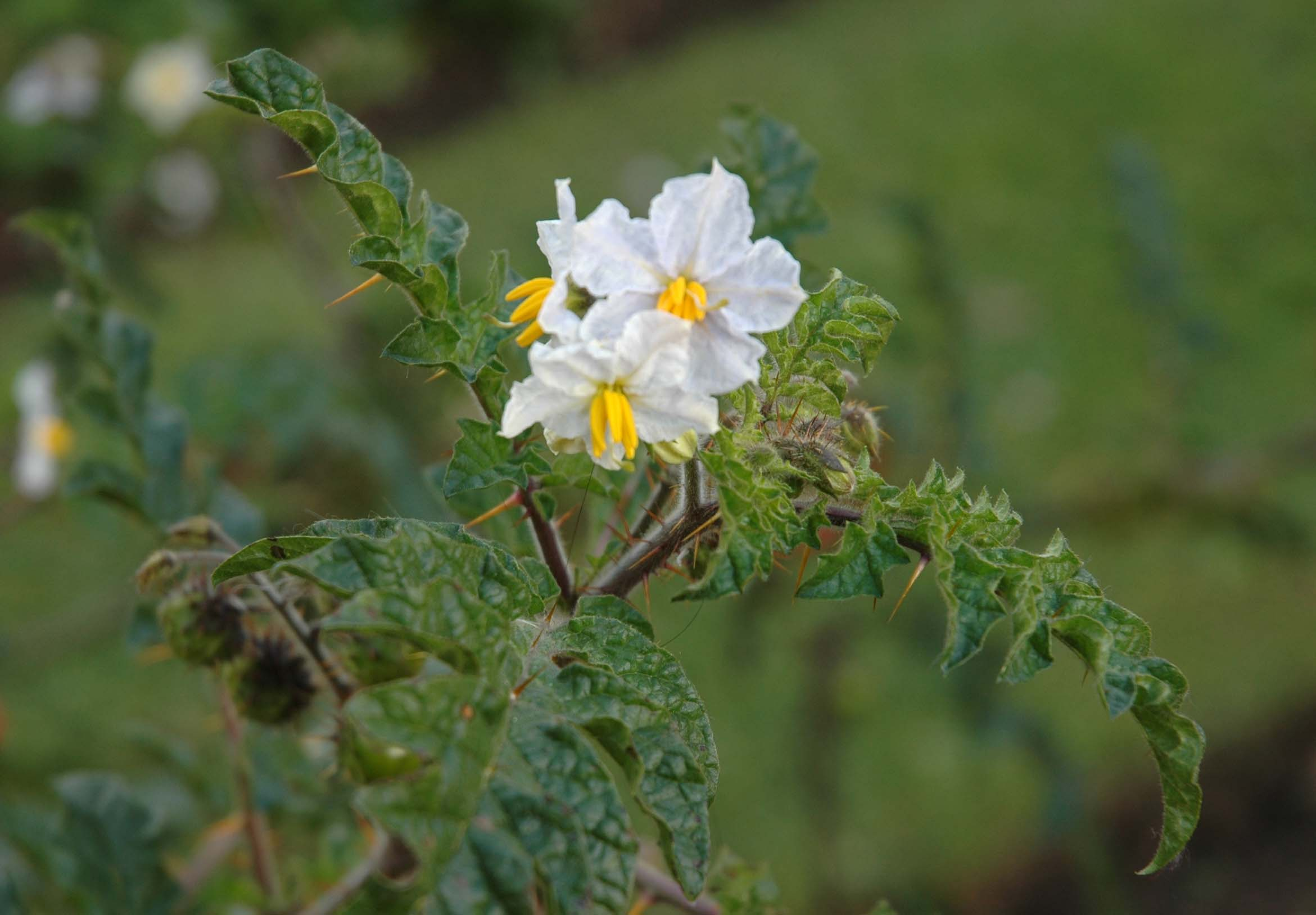
- In bloom at the Jardin des plantes de Paris
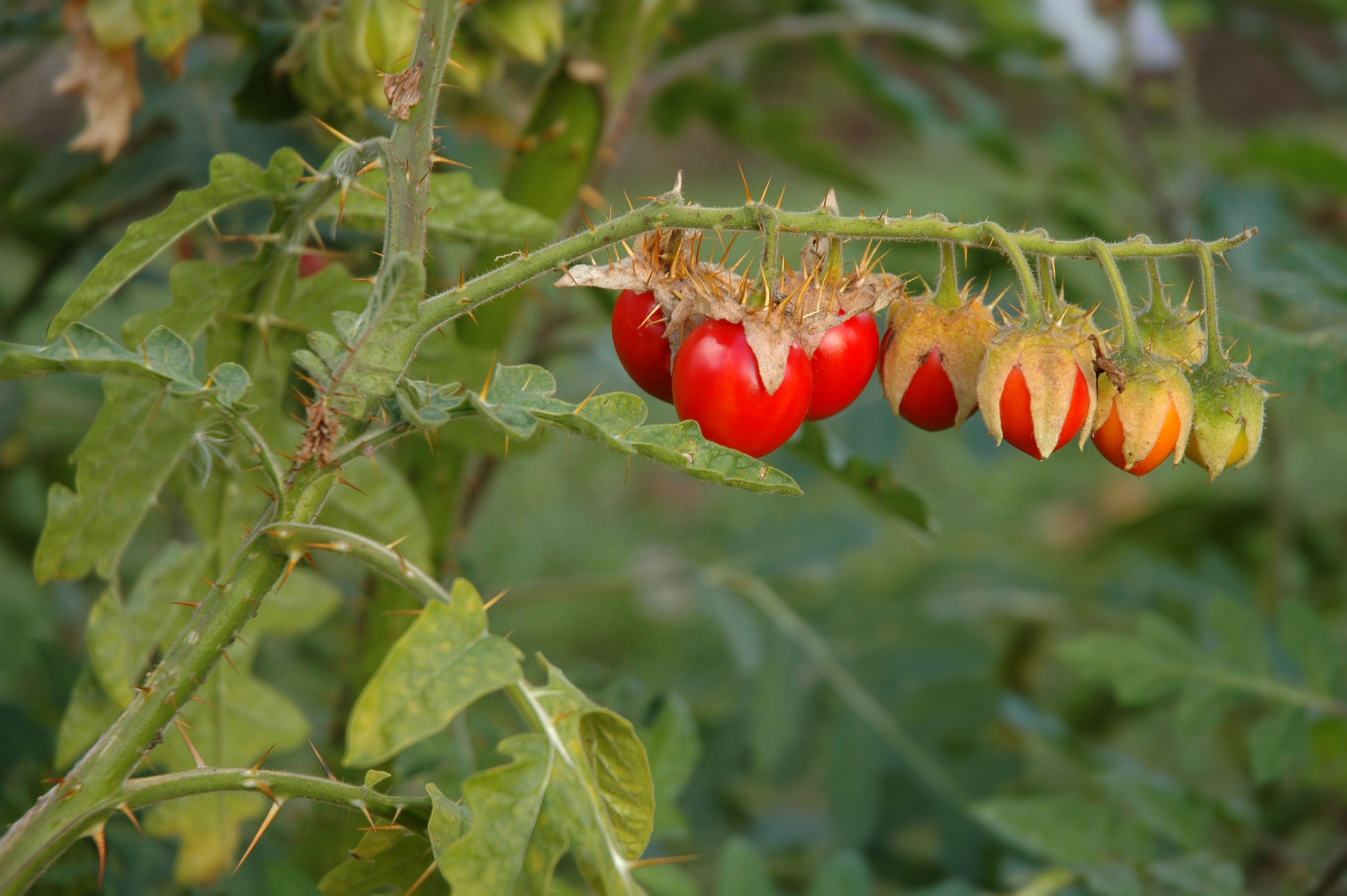
- Fruit

Scientific classification
- Kingdom: Plantae
- Clade: Tracheophytes
- Clade: Angiosperms
- Clade: Eudicots
- Clade: Asterids
- Order: Solanales
- Family: Solanaceae
- Genus: Solanum
- Species: S. heterodoxum

Binomial name
- Solanum heterodoxum Dunal

Synonyms
- List: Androcera heterodoxa (Dunal) Standl.; Nycterium heterodoxum (Dunal) Link; Nycterium violaceum Engelm. ex Walp.; Solanum chrysacanthum Dunal; Solanum mullus Dunal; Solanum virginianum Pav. ex Dunal

= Solanum heterodoxum =

Species of plant in the nightshade family

Solanum heterodoxum, the melonleaf nightshade, is a species of flowering plant in the family Solanaceae. It is native to Mexico and the US state of New Mexico, and has been introduced to Bulgaria. Solanum heterodoxum var. setigeroides is now considered to be a full species, Solanum setigeroides, native to more northerly areas of the United States than S. heterodoxum.

== Subtaxa ==
The following variety is accepted:

- Solanum heterodoxum var. heterodoxum
