= Conspecific song preference =

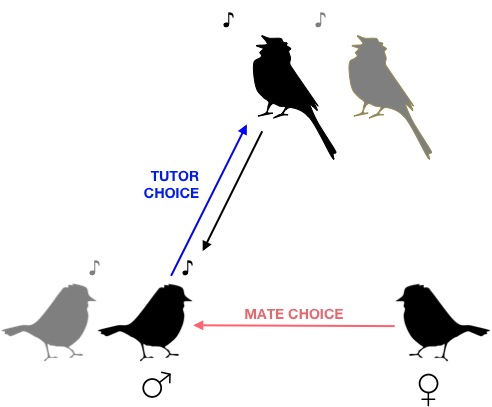
Female songbirds use male song as a cue for species recognition during mate choice, and males acquire these songs from a tutor early in life. Both processes require discrimination of conspecific from heterospecific song.

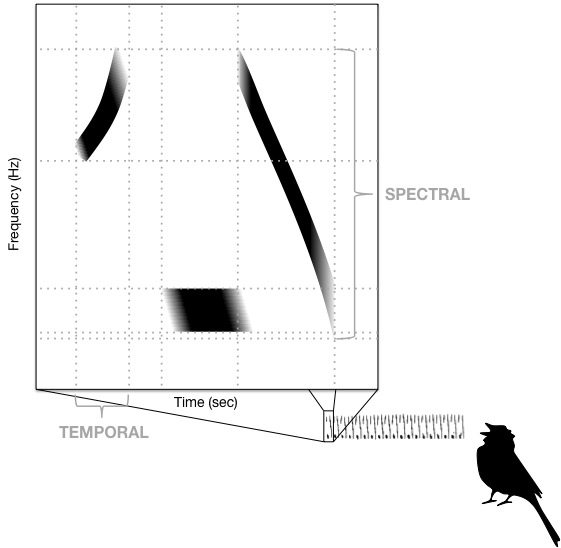
Birdsong elements, such as the swamp sparrow (Melospiza georgiana) syllable shown here, have unique spectral and temporal properties. Auditory neurons are tuned for the spectral and temporal features present in conspecific songs.

Conspecific song preference is the ability songbirds require to distinguish conspecific song from heterospecific song in order for females to choose an appropriate mate, and for juvenile males to choose an appropriate song tutor during vocal learning. Researchers studying the swamp sparrow (Melospiza georgiana) have demonstrated that young birds are born with this ability, because juvenile males raised in acoustic isolation and tutored with artificial recordings choose to learn only songs that contain their own species' syllables. Studies conducted at later life stages indicate that conspecific song preference is further refined and strengthened throughout development as a function of social experience. The selective response properties of neurons in the songbird auditory pathway has been proposed as the mechanism responsible for both the innate and acquired components of this preference.

== Neural mechanisms ==
The mechanism responsible for the ability to distinguish song types has not yet been fully characterized by researchers in the field of neuroethology, but it has been demonstrated that at least five different structures within the auditory pathway contain neurons that preferentially respond to conspecific song. The structure of neural networks, the morphology of neurons, and the receptor and ion channel complement of pre-synaptic connections cause some neurons to respond maximally to a particular stimulus frequency, phase, amplitude or temporal pattern, and this is known as spectral-temporal tuning. Tight spectral-temporal tuning in the auditory pathway provides the central nervous system of songbirds with the ability to discriminate between conspecific and heterospecific songs. Tuning characteristics of auditory neurons have been best characterized in zebra finch (Taeniopygia guttata), canary (Serinus canaria), European starling (Sturnus vulgaris) and Western barn owl (Tyto alba).

=== Learning and motor pathways ===
The conventional song system of songbirds has two parts: the anterior forebrain pathway (AFP) involved in song learning, and the posterior forebrain pathway or "song motor pathway" (PFP/SMP) involved in song production. Both of these descending pathways contain neurons that are responsive to conspecific song. Female Canaries lost the ability to discriminate between conspecific and heterospecific song after bilateral lesions to the high vocal center HVC, a nucleus that sits at the apex of both pathways. In males, however, most song system neurons respond maximally to the sound of the bird's own song, even more than they do to the tutor's song or any other conspecific song. In HVC, neurons switch from responding best to tutor song (35–69 days post-hatch) to responding best to the bird's own song (>70 days post-hatch). Song preferences of neurons in these pathways are important for sensorimotor learning, however several lines of evidence suggest that the specific ability to discriminate conspecific from heterospecific song does not reside in the AFP or the SMP. Most importantly, gene expression studies have demonstrated that, as a broad unit, neurons in the AFP and SMP show increased activation when a bird is singing, but not when it is simply listening to song. With the exception of female Canaries, the neural substrate for conspecific song preference is thought to reside outside the conventional song system, in the auditory pathway.

=== Cochlea ===
Avian hair cells have been extensively studied in the cochlea of the barn owl, and it is now known that both the morphological structure of hair cell papillae and the ion channels that characterize hair cell membranes confer spectral tuning properties. Ca^{2+} dependent K^{+} channels are produced as splice variants of the cSlo gene, and different isoforms cause the hair cell to preferentially respond to different resonant frequencies. Species-specific differences in cSlo isoforms of hair cell membranes may therefore play a role in the discrimination of conspecific and heterospecific notes in songbirds.

==== Auditory thalamus ====
Studies on zebra finch have shown that nuclei in the auditory thalamus, two steps up from the cochlea, do not passively relay input from peripheral sensory structures into higher forebrain structures. Thalamic nuclei show different patterns of gene expression in response to different stimuli, implicating them in the process of acoustic discrimination. Neurons in the nucleus ovoidalis (Ov) have receptive fields that are tuned to respond to the specific combination of spectral and temporal features present in syllables of conspecific song. Stimulus-selective tuning is determined by the receptor proteins and ion channels characterizing synapses of these neurons. Neurons can selectively respond to time-based differences between songs (e.g. syllable length or syllable-interval length) if they are post-synaptic to either fast-release (ionotropic) or slow-release (metabotropic) glutamate receptors.

==== Auditory forebrain ====
Strong conspecific-selective responses have been most consistently demonstrated in neurons of the higher-level structures of the auditory system: The caudomedial neostriatum (NCM), the auditory thalamo-recipient subfield (Field L: L1, L2a, L2b, L3), and the caudal mesopallium (CM: CMM and CLM). NCM and CM have been known to be discussed in conjunction with one another being as they are functionally similar. Recent studies have begun to show that while that is true, CM seems to respond in a manner relative to whether or not the stimulus is personally significant to the bird.

In European starlings, neurons in NCM habituate to a particular stimulus, and "remember" individual characteristics of songs to which a bird was exposed. This indicates that NCM functions in individual recognition, through the strategic recruitment of N-Methyl-D-aspartate receptors (NMDAR) to synapses that receive repeated patterns of excitation. In fact, NMDARs are thought to be the unit broadly responsible for synaptic memory in the central nervous system. NMDARs in NCM neurons, therefore, might be a compelling target for selection when song functions in discrimination among conspecific songs, for neighbor recognition and territorial defense, but NCM is unlikely to play a role in the discrimination of conspecific from heterospecific songs.

In male zebra finches, neurons in Field L and CM do not exhibit a preference for different types of conspecific songs (in contrast to neurons in NCM, and those that participate in the AFP and SMP). Field L and CM neurons do not discriminate between the tutor song, the bird's own song, or individual conspecifics. Instead, they demonstrate a higher-order preference for conspecific song over heterospecific song or other types of sound. When male and female European starlings are trained to recognize conspecific song, there is an associated change in the response of CMM neurons, and female zebra finches experience a reduced ability to discriminate between conspecific and heterospecific song following lesions to the region. However, CMM neurons in females also show increased activation in response to their father's song over a novel conspecific song, demonstrating that this nucleus also participates in some selectivity among conspecific songs in females.

Neurons in both Field L and CM have sophisticated filter properties, selective for both the spectral-temporal modulations and phase relationships of conspecific songs. Furthermore, different neurons are selective for different features of syllables and songs. In Field L, neurons have one of four different tuning strategies—they are either tightly tuned a particular frequency, or they are sensitive to frequency edges, frequency sweeps or combined frequencies. When exposed to natural song as a stimulus, different ensembles of these of neurons respond to different components of sound, and together they demonstrate the ability to perform sensitive discrimination between conspecific and heterospecific syllable types. As in nucleus ovoidalis, the spectral-temporal filter properties of Field L and CM neurons are a function of the particular ion channels and receptor proteins driving their synaptic dynamics. The complex and sophisticated tuning of these higher order processing centers for conspecific sounds may rely on the integrated inputs from the entire ascending auditory pathway, from the hair cells through the thalamus and forebrain, but this challenging synthetic question remains to be investigated.

== Evolutionary significance ==
In an evolutionary context, neural mechanisms of conspecific song preference in the auditory pathway are important for species recognition. Species recognition traits play a central role in both the origin and maintenance of reproductive isolation. Furthermore, a shared neural mechanism for conspecific song preference has implications for the coevolution of male song and female preference, which may help explain the dramatic diversity of song phenotypes in extant songbirds<.
