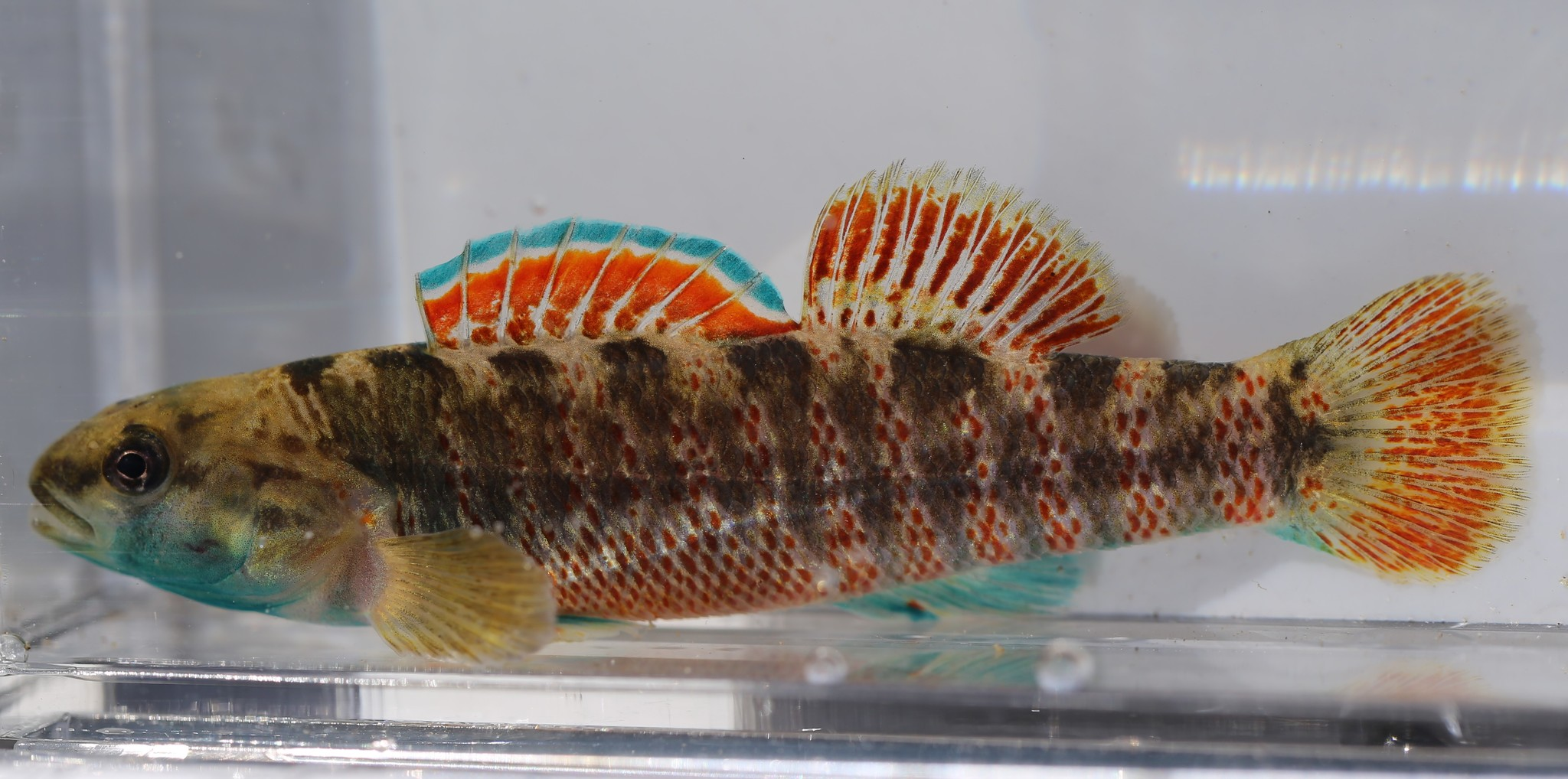
- In Texas

Conservation status
- Near Threatened (IUCN 3.1)

Scientific classification
- Kingdom: Animalia
- Phylum: Chordata
- Class: Actinopterygii
- Order: Perciformes
- Family: Percidae
- Genus: Etheostoma
- Species: E. lepidum

Binomial name
- Etheostoma lepidum Baird & Girard, 1853

= Greenthroat darter =

Species of fish

The greenthroat darter (Etheostoma lepidum) is a species of freshwater ray-finned fish, a darter from the subfamily Etheostomatinae, part of the family Percidae, which also contains the perches, ruffes and pikeperches. It is found in Colorado, Guadalupe and Nueces River drainages in Texas; and in Pecos River system in New Mexico.

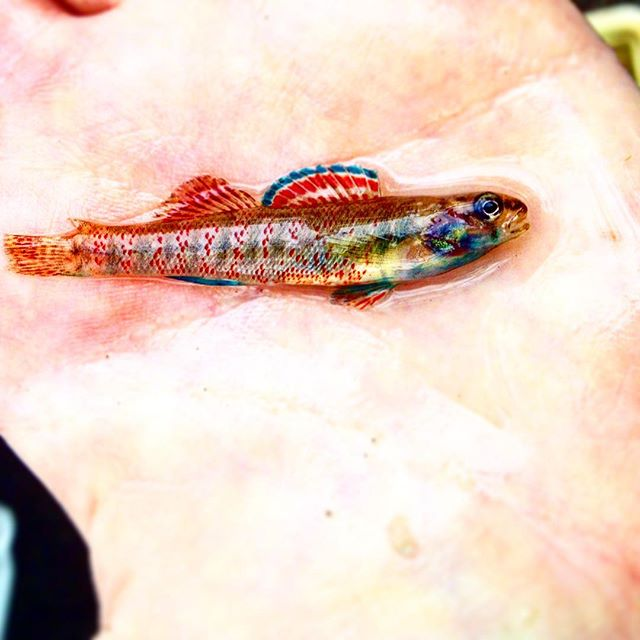
From the Comal River, Texas

== Habitat Associations ==
Macrohabitat: Basically a spring-run species. Mesohabitat: Scarce or absent from very eurythermal locations. Occurs in a variety of non-turbid stream habitats with substrates from bedrock to silt covered (Platania 1980). A typical riffle species occurring over gravel and rubble, especially when aquatic vegetation is present. It also lives in spring areas, sometimes in cool vegetated pools. Largest populations occur in vegetated rocky riffles. Species benthic after hatching.

== Biology ==
=== Spawning season ===
October or November through May, with populations in stenothermal environments having a longer spawning season than those in more eurythermal environments. In the Colorado River, Texas, spawning occurs November – May; in the South Concho River, Texas, spawning occurs October – May. Hubbs (1985) reported marked drop in reproductive activity when water temperature was raised from 20 to 23 °C.

=== Spawning habitat ===
Eggs laid on vegetation, or on the underside of rocks.

=== Fecundity ===
In the South Concho River, TX, eggs averaged 1.3 mm in diameter, and increased in number with female size; average number of eggs in females examined was 74, with a range of about 15–200. In aquaria, spawning was observed at approximately 15–25 °C; over a 63-day period, a pair of Etheostoma lepidum laid 13 batches of eggs; numbers of eggs laid ranged from 47 to 109, totaling 1,115. Optimal temperature for egg production apparently 20–23 °C; a female held at this temperature range was observed to produce eggs, in the laboratory environment, over a period of at least 251 days. Egg incubation success is low above 24 degrees C. At 28 degrees C, eggs hatch in 4–5 days, and hatch in about 40 days at 9 °C. Hubbs (1985) noted that no difference in egg production could be correlated with daylength.
