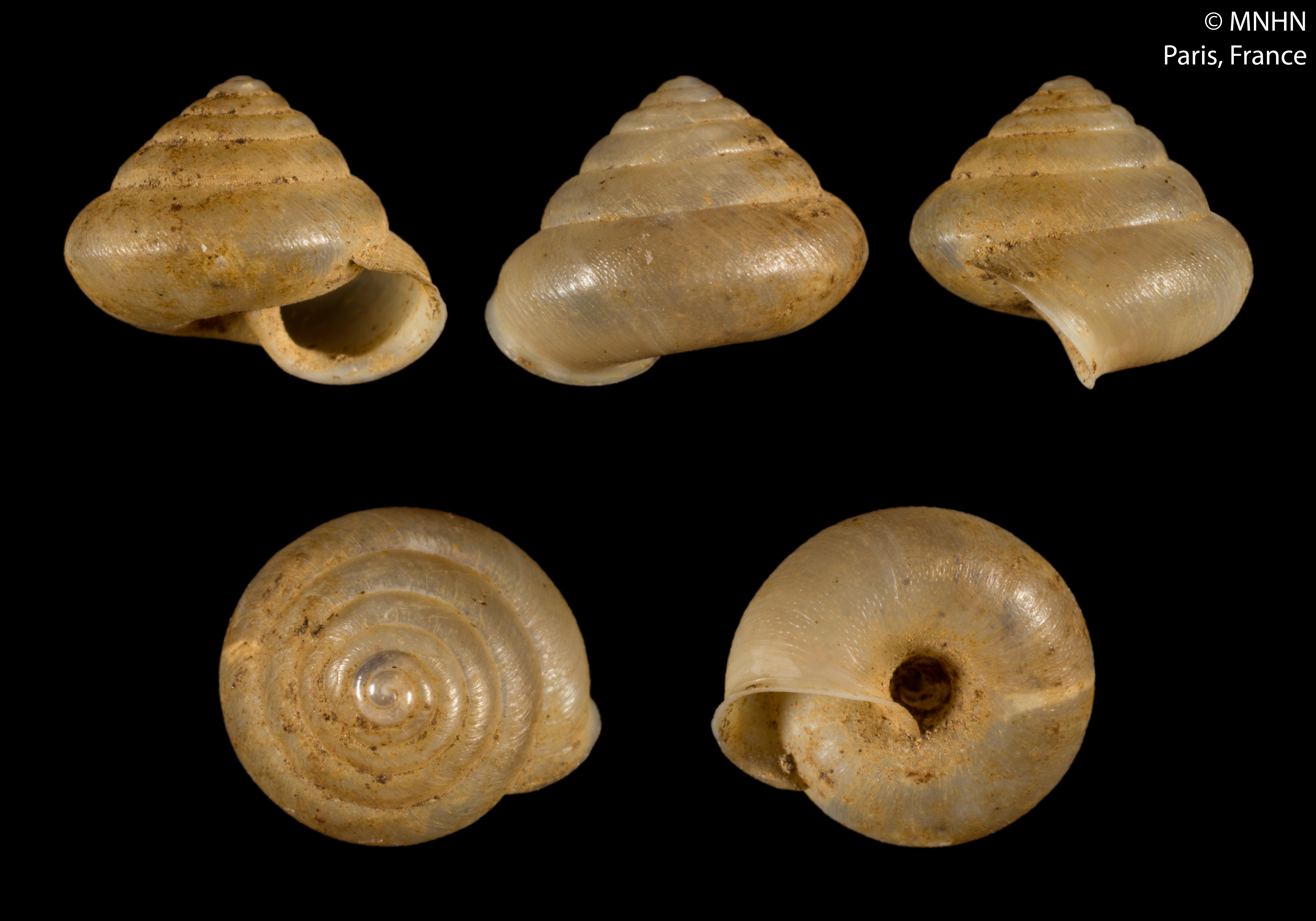
- Shell of Aegista coudeini (syntype at MNHN, Paris)

Scientific classification
- Kingdom: Animalia
- Phylum: Mollusca
- Class: Gastropoda
- Order: Stylommatophora
- Family: Camaenidae
- Genus: Aegista
- Species: A. coudeini

Binomial name
- Aegista coudeini (Bavay & Dautzenberg, 1900)
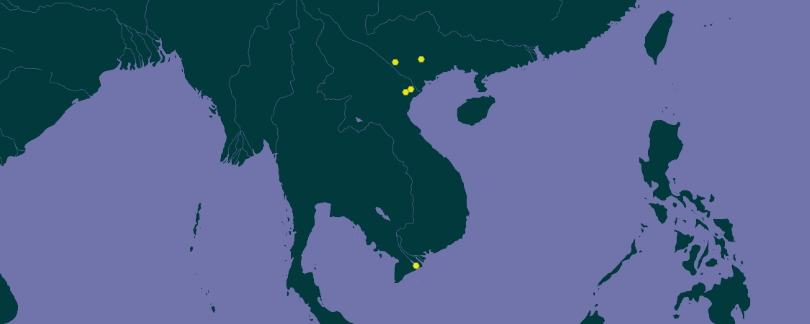

Synonyms
- Ganesella coudeini (Bavay & Dautzenberg, 1900); Helix (Ganesella) coudeini Bavay & Dautzenberg, 1900 (original combination)

= Aegista coudeini =

Species of gastropod

Aegista coudeini is a species of air-breathing land snails, a terrestrial pulmonate gastropod in the family Camaenidae.

== Distribution and habitat ==
This species occurs in Vietnam and Laos.
