= Satsuma eucosmia =

Scientific classification
- Kingdom: Animalia
- Phylum: Mollusca
- Class: Gastropoda
- Order: Stylommatophora
- Family: Camaenidae
- Genus: Satsuma
- Species: S. eucosmia

Binomial name
- Satsuma eucosmia (Pilsbry, 1895)

Species of gastropod

Satsuma eucosmia is a species of gastropods belonging to the family Camaenidae.

The species is found in Japan.
