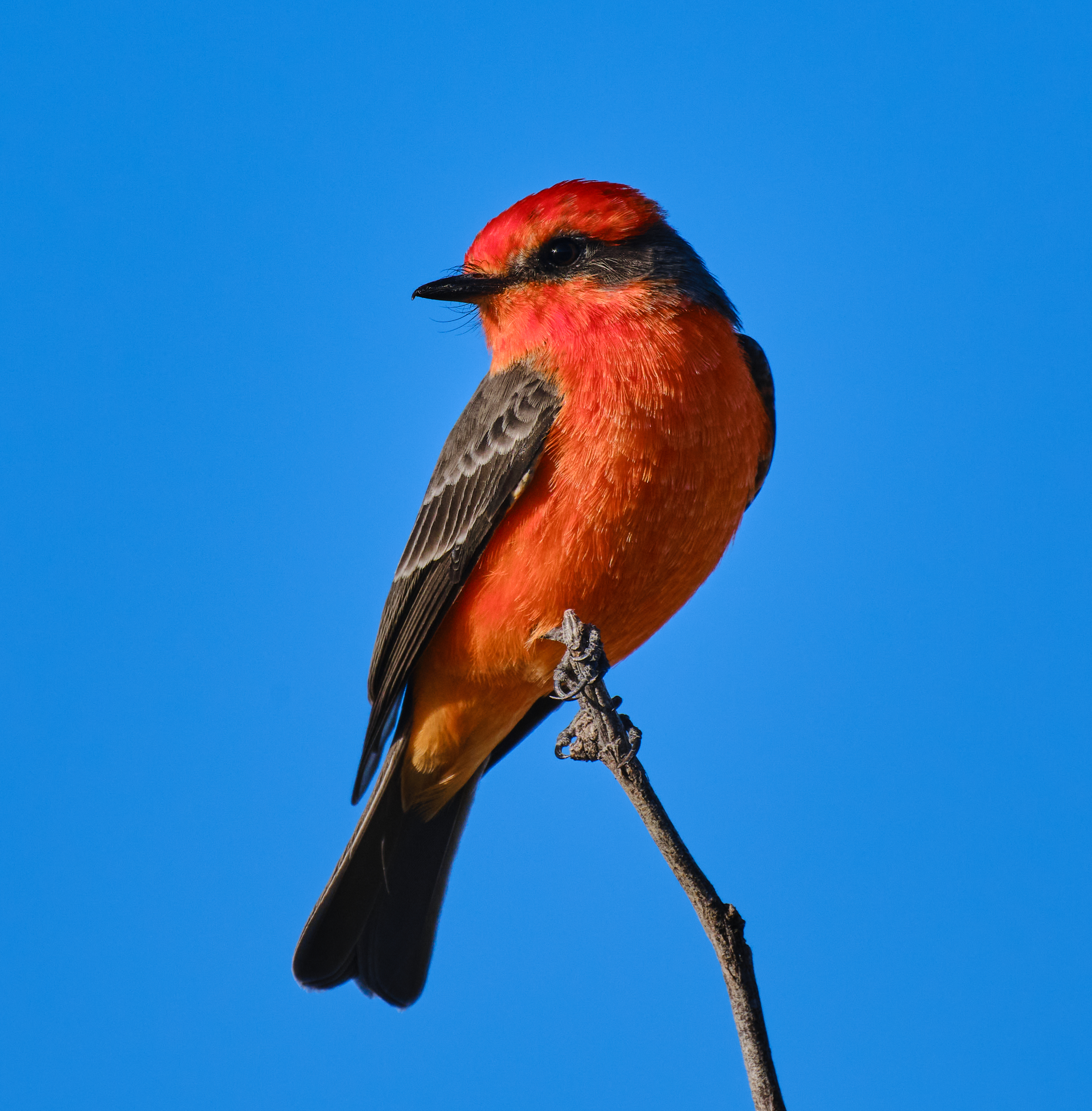

Conservation status
- Least Concern (IUCN 3.1)

Scientific classification
- Kingdom: Animalia
- Phylum: Chordata
- Class: Aves
- Order: Passeriformes
- Family: Tyrannidae
- Genus: Pyrocephalus
- Species: P. obscurus

Binomial name
- Pyrocephalus obscurus Gould, 1839

Subspecies
- See text
- Range map Year-round Breeding Nonbreeding

Audio
- Call of vermilion flycatcher

= Vermilion flycatcher =

Vermilion flycatcher Temporal range: 1.15–0 Ma (present)

Species of bird in the Americas

The vermilion flycatcher (Pyrocephalus obscurus) is a small passerine bird in the tyrant flycatcher family found throughout South America and southern North America. It is a striking exception among the generally drab Tyrannidae due to its vermilion-red coloration. The males have bright red crowns, chests, and underparts, with brownish wings and tails. Females lack the vivid red coloration and can be hard to identify—they may be confused for Say's phoebe. The vermilion flycatcher's song is a pit pit pit pidddrrrreeedrr, which is variable and important in establishing a territory. Riparian habitats and semi-open environments are preferred. As aerial insectivores, they catch their prey while flying. Their several months-long molt begins in summer.

Despite being socially monogamous, vermilion flycatchers will engage in extra-pair copulation. They also practice within-species brood parasitism, whereby females lay their eggs in the nest of another individual. Females build shallow open cup nests and incubate the brown-speckled whitish eggs. The male feeds the female during incubation. Two broods of two or three eggs are laid in a season lasting from March through June. Once hatched, both males and females feed the chicks, which are ready to fledge after 15 days.

The species was first described in the late 1830s as a result of the voyages of Charles Darwin. The taxonomy of the genus Pyrocephalus was revised in 2016, which led to the identification of several new species from the vermilion flycatcher's subspecies, including the now-extinct San Cristóbal flycatcher. Populations have declined because of habitat loss, though the species remains abundant. The overall population numbers are in the millions, thus the International Union for Conservation of Nature considers it a species of least concern.

== Taxonomy and systematics ==
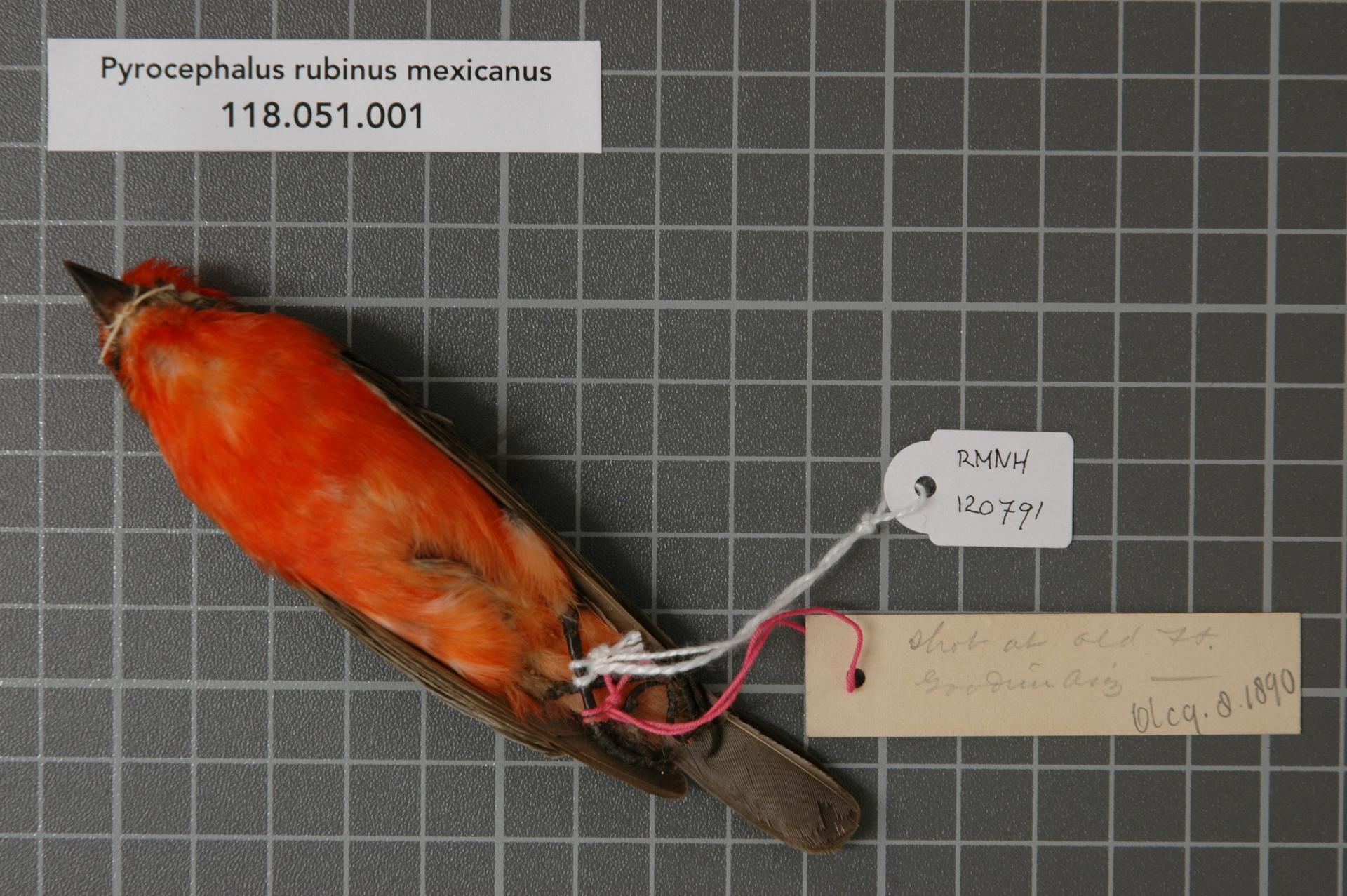
Museum specimen from 1890

The tyrant flycatcher family, Tyrannidae, is a group of passerine birds present only in the Americas; its members are generally drab in coloration. Within it, the subfamily Fluvicolinae comprises the genera Pyrocephalus, Contopus, Empidonax, and Sayornis. They likely share a common ancestor that belonged to the genus Contopus or Xenotriccus and later diversified. The Pyrocephalus are most closely related to Sayornis in terms of morphology, but genetic analysis shows they may be more closely related to Fluvicola.

The first description of the vermilion flycatcher was in 1839 by John Gould, who created the current genus Pyrocephalus, and designated his find as Pyrocephalus obscurus. The identification was based on specimens brought back by Charles Darwin on the second voyage of HMS Beagle, which lasted from 1831 to 1836. The species was then designated as Pyrocephalus rubinus by the English zoologist George Robert Gray in 1840, based on Darwin's specimen taken from James Island. A 2016 molecular study changed the taxonomy of the species, splitting off several new species and re-designated the original bird as Pyrocephalus obscurus. Before the study it was considered a monotypic genus, but now taxonomists (including the International Ornithologists' Union) have elevated three of the vermilion flycatcher subspecies to the rank of species: the Darwin's, San Cristóbal, and scarlet flycatchers.

The genus name Pyrocephalus is Greek and roughly translates to "fire head" or "flame headed". The specific epithet obscurus is Latin and means "dark" or "dusky". The common name comes from its vibrant coloration and its membership in the flycatcher family, which is reflected in its insect-rich diet.

=== Subspecies ===
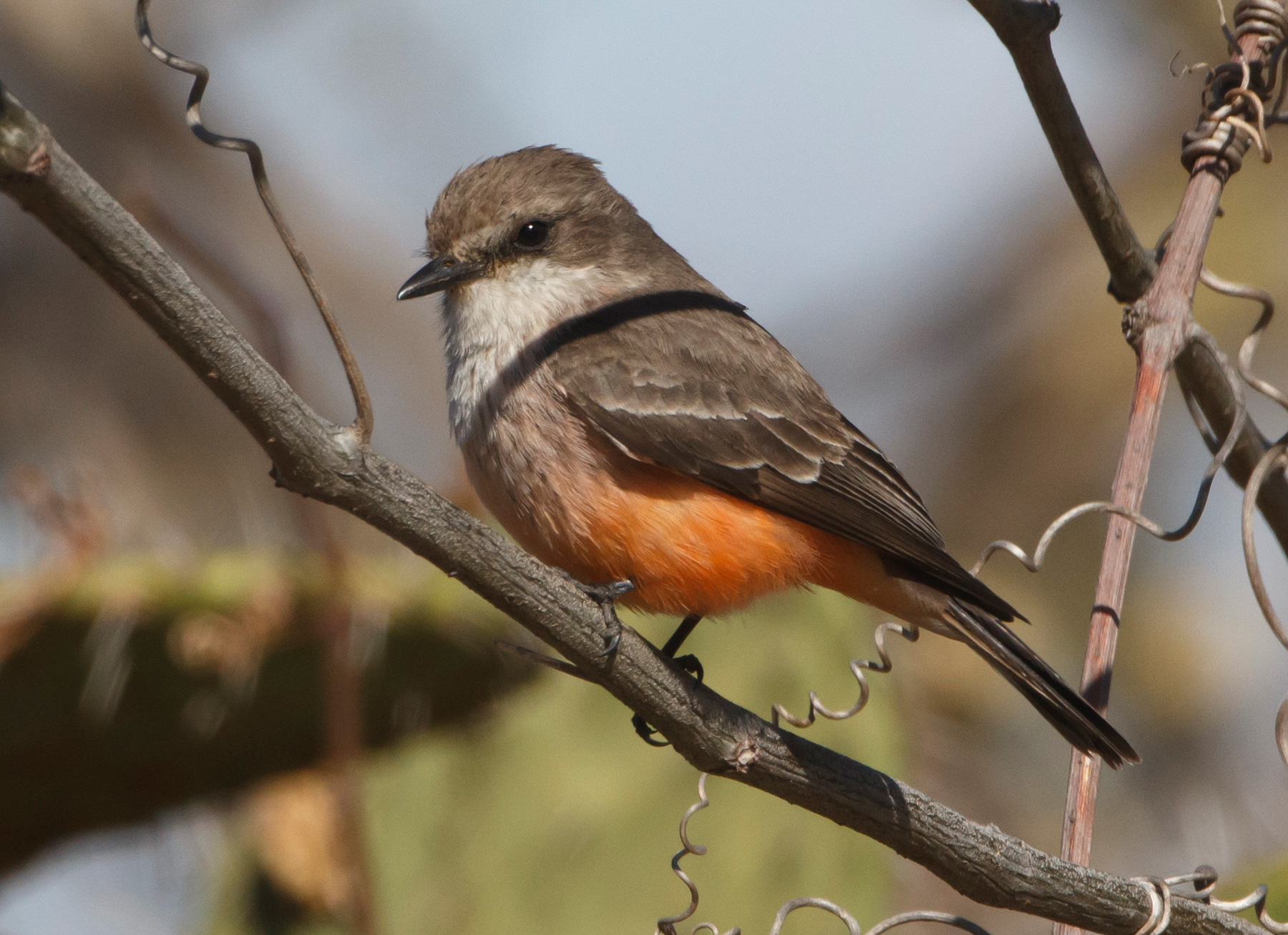
Female P. o. mexicanus, San Augustin Etla, Oaxaca, Mexico

Before 2016, authors had recognized between 11 and 13 subspecies (sometimes called races). A 2016 molecular study revised that to nine subspecies, made two others their species (P. nanus—Darwin's flycatcher, P. dubius—San Cristóbal flycatcher, P. rubinus—scarlet flycatcher), and determined that another was not valid (P. major). Some works still refer to the vermilion flycatcher as Pyrocephalus rubinus, which can lead to confusion with the scarlet flycatcher (also called Pyrocephalus rubinus). The vermilion flycatcher likely evolved around 1.15 million years ago (mya), the species on the Galápagos Islands having split off around 0.82 mya. The South American subspecies had coalesced by about 0.56 mya, and the North American subspecies had diverged from the South American by 0.25 mya.

There are nine widely recognized subspecies, which differ primarily in the color and saturation of the male's plumage and the color and amount of streaking of the female's. The geographic boundaries between some subspecies are not well defined:

- P. o. obscurus (Gould, 1839)—The nominate race, which is found in the Lima region of western Peru.
- P. o. mexicanus (Sclater, 1859)—Found from southern Texas in the United States south to central and southern Mexico. Its upperparts are the blackest of any race, and the male lacks any mottling on the red parts. This subspecies is named after Mexico.
- P. o. saturatus (von Berlepsch and Hartert, 1902)—Found in northeastern Colombia, western and northern Venezuela, Guyana and northern Brazil. The female has pink underparts. Saturatus means "richly colored" in Latin.
- P. o. blatteus (Bangs in 1911)—Found in southeastern Mexico, Belize and northern Guatemala. The upperparts are paler, and the underparts more red compared to the nominate race, lacking an orange tinge. It is also smaller than the other Mexican races. Blatteus means "purple colored" in Latin.
- P. o. flammeus (van Rossem, 1934)—Found in the southwestern United States and northwestern Mexico. The upperparts are paler and slightly gray, and the underparts are more orange colored than the nominate race. Males may also have orange mottling in the crown and breast, whereas the females are less streaky. Flammeus means "flame colored" in Latin.
- P. o. ardens (Zimmer, 1941)—Found in northern Peru, in extreme eastern Piura, Cajamarca, and Amazonas. Their coloration has been described as "fiery red". The front of the females crown is slightly pink. Ardens means "burning" in Latin.
- P. o. cocachacrae (Zimmer, 1941)—Found from southwestern Peru south to extreme northern Chile. The male has a browner mantle and less red underparts, while the female has less white underparts, compared to the nominate race. The type locality is the Cocachacra District in Peru.
- P. o. piurae (Zimmer, 1941)—Found from western Colombia south to northwestern Peru, it is named for the Piura province in Peru.
- P. o. pinicola (Howell, 1965)—Found in eastern Honduras and northeastern Nicaragua. It is smaller than P. o. blatteus, and the females have more orange underparts. It prefers pine savanna habitats, which is reflected in the name Pinicola: it roughly translates to "pine tree dweller" from Latin.

== Description ==
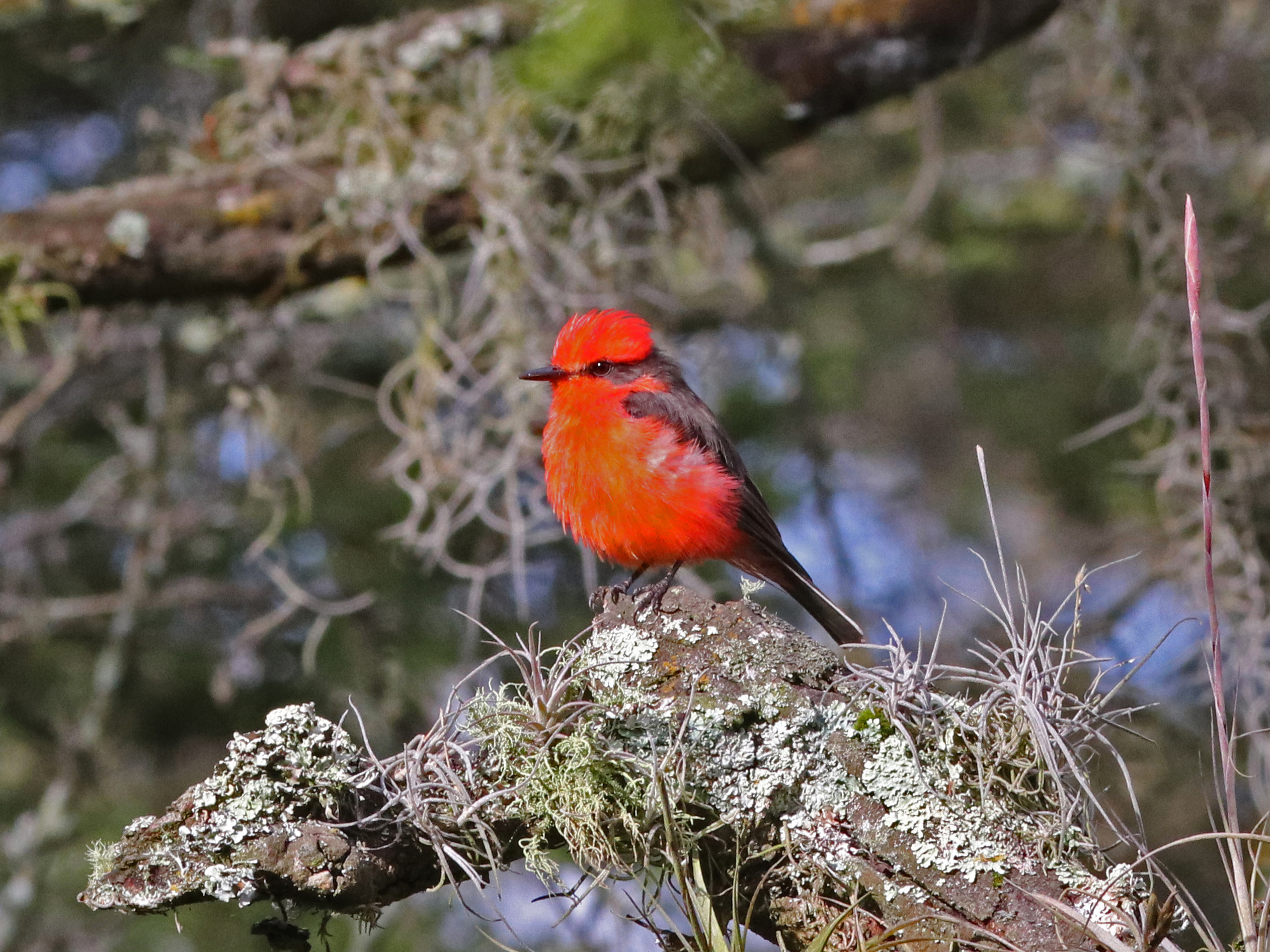
Male in Bosque Protector Jerusalem, Ecuador

The vermilion flycatcher is a small bird, measuring 13–14 cm (5.1–5.5 in) from tip to tail, around 7.8 cm (3.1 in) from wingtip to body, with a mass between 11 and 14 g (0.39 and 0.49 oz). Wingspan ranges from 24 to 25 cm (9.4 to 9.8 in). It is strongly dimorphic. Males are bright red, with contrasting dark brown plumage. Females are drab and have a peach-colored belly with a dark gray upperside. The reddish color varies but can be vermilion, scarlet, or orangish. In males, the crown, chest, and underparts are red. The lores (region in front of the eyes), nape, ear coverts, wings, upperparts, and tail are all brown to blackish brown. The female has a grayish crown, as well as grayish ear coverts, wings, and tail. The flight feathers and wing coverts are slightly paler gray, which create a barring effect. The supercilium (eyebrow) is whiter. The underparts start white but become light red moving downward. Juveniles of both sexes look similar to adult females; juvenile males have much brighter red underparts, whereas juvenile females have yellowish underparts. Plumage appears constant throughout the year for both adult sexes and for juveniles. They have a slight crest, which can be raised when needed. Males are not easily mistaken for other species, but the drab females may be confused with the Say's phoebe.

Worn feathers are replaced by molting, which takes between 62 and 79 days and begins in July, lasting until September. Many vermilion flycatchers molt only after completing their migration to warmer regions. The molt is fairly slow compared to that of other families, as quick molting creates poor feathers and interrupts flight, which is untenable for an aerially feeding species. A 2013 study determined that monsoon rain patterns do not affect molting, as had been previously expected. Instead, latitude-based temporal effects are more important in timing the molt.

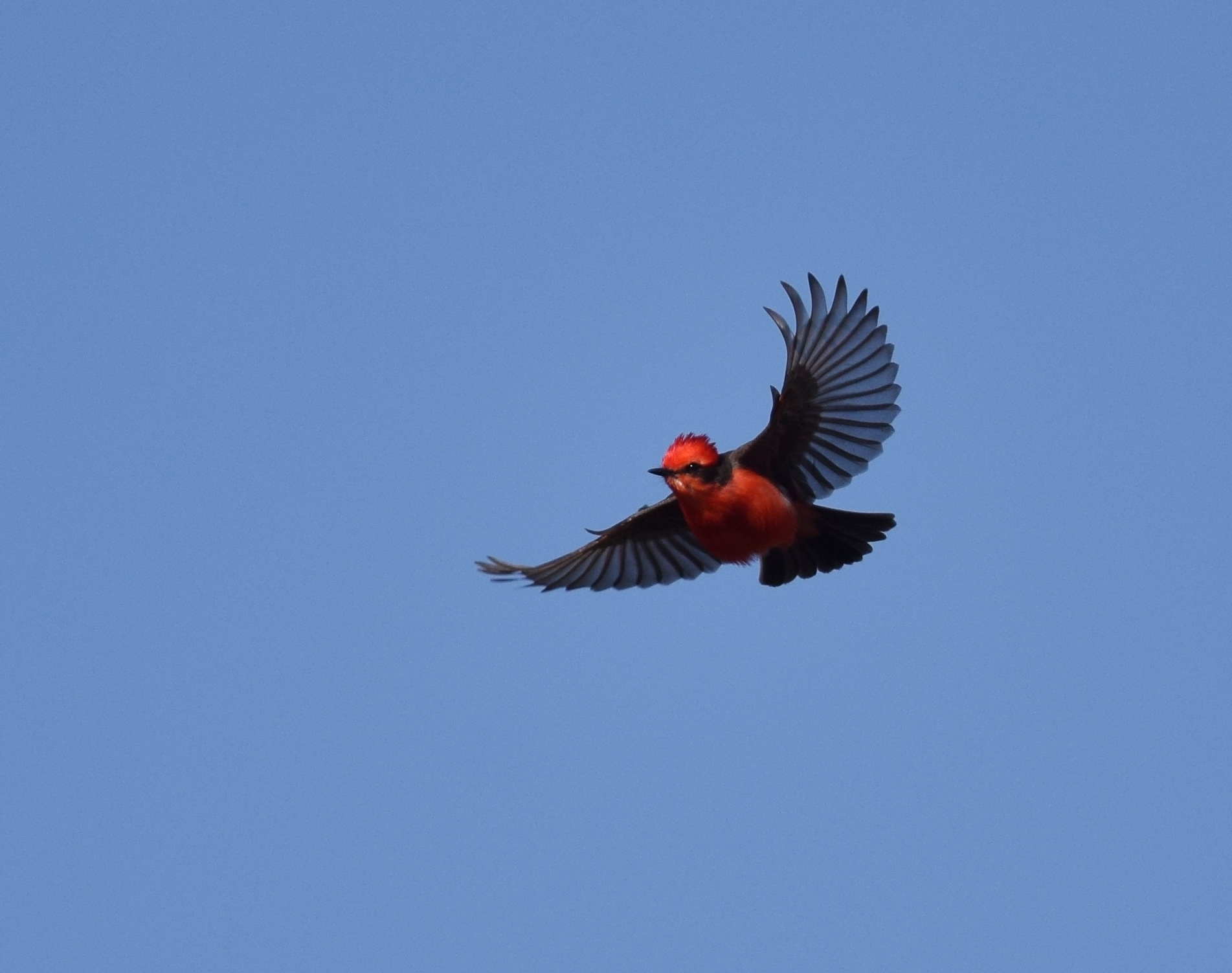
In flight, showing off the flight feathers

=== Vocalizations ===
Ornithologist David Sibley describes the perching song as a pit pit pit pidddrrrreedrr, whereas the Cornell Lab of Ornithology describes it as a ching-tink-a-le-tink, with an emphasis on the last syllable. The flight song is given by males who fly high above the canopy, and is described as a pt-pt-pre-ee-een by the Cornell Lab. The regular song may also be given as a slower chatter call. Other noises include a pees noise that is given as a call. A peent is given while foraging, but a more aggressive variety is also used between males. As a lead-up to copulation, the female may give a tjee-tjee-tjee call.

The call of the vermilion flycatcher is important in establishing its territory. Males make only a single song while perching, but can alter the song to convey different intentions. The male's song consists of a variable first part, and a second part with four elements. The first part of the song gets longer after nest construction, and before dawn. The first part encodes information regarding the quality of the male to potential mates and the level of threat to other males—which is related to the intensity with which males defend their territory. Females do not usually sing. Urban noise pollution appears to affect songs; a population in Mexico City was found to sing louder and longer songs as ambient noise increased. Singing is not heard year-round; populations in Arizona and Texas sing only from late February through July.

Non-vocal sounds include snapping the beak, by males between songs and by females while watching male courtship flights. Their wings may also be used to create a whirring noise while perch hopping or during territorial displays, though this is practiced infrequently.

== Distribution and habitat ==
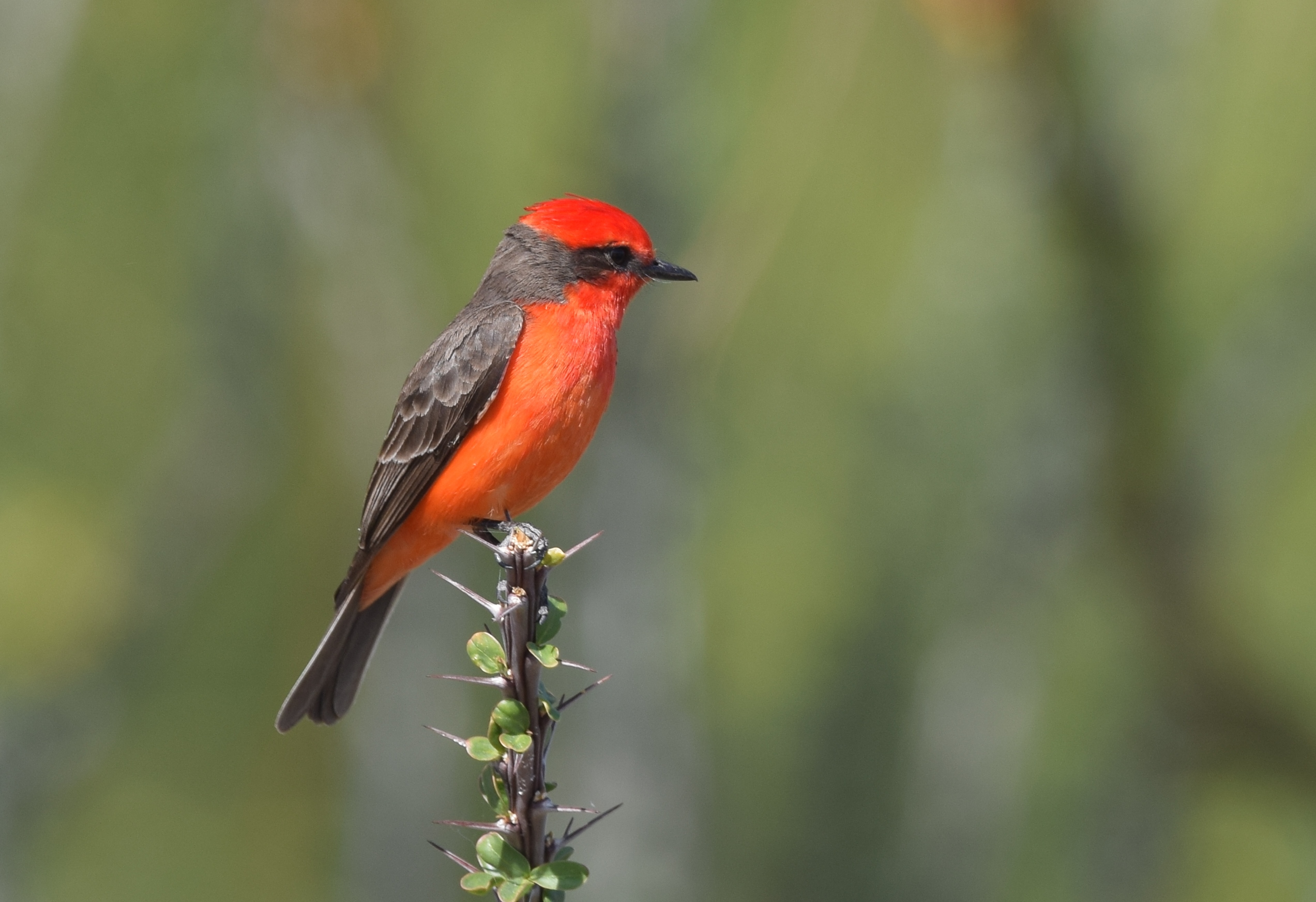
Male on an ocotillo in Arizona

Their range includes almost all of Mexico, extending north into the southwestern United States, and south to scattered portions of Central America, and parts of northwestern and central South America. It has ranged as far north as Canada. North American populations are generally resident, migrating only at the edge of the range. South American populations, especially those further south, may make long migrations to the northernmost parts of the Brazilian Amazon. This reflects a tendency to overwinter in areas where the temperature does not go below −1 °C (30 °F). Migrations may extend up to 4,000 km (2,500 mi). North American populations generally migrate by late August and return between February and April. Their ability to migrate likely aided their wide colonization of the Americas.

Vermilion flycatchers prefer somewhat open areas and are found in trees or shrubs in savanna, scrub, agricultural areas, riparian woodlands, and desert as well, but usually near water. They range up to elevations of 3,000 m (9,800 ft). A study in Arizona found that their preferred breeding range included cottonwood or mesquite tree canopies, although Fremont cottonwoods were not favored. Goodding's willow was preferred as a nesting site where found. Understory plants mainly consisted of invasive Cynodon dactylon grass.

== Behavior ==
Vermilion flycatchers are generally solitary, though they may form small flocks of not more than five individuals during winter. They spend most of their time in trees perching, landing on the ground only rarely to catch insects. They do not generally hop, preferring to fly to get around, and glide only infrequently.

=== Breeding and nesting ===
Vermilion flycatchers are socially monogamous, but engage in extra-pair copulation. Both males and females will breed with individuals other than their monogamous mate. A 2002 study found that 11% of offspring were from extra-paternal copulation. They also practice intra-specific brood parasitism, where females lay their eggs in the nest of another vermilion flycatcher. Between 9.5 and 19% of offspring were the result of brood parasitism. Females often spend long times away from the nest, which enables others to lay eggs in their nests while absent. This may simply be a form of parasitism, wherein the pair whose nest is being parasitized gains no benefit. But for promiscuous birds, this may provide some genetic fitness. For a male mating with many females, and those females laying many of their eggs outside of their nest, this increases the odds that a promiscuous male's offspring are laid in his nest. This allows the male to outsource the energy-intensive process of egg-laying away from his mate and allows a female to outsource the process of raising her chick. This is supported by examples of males letting females parasitize their nests in exchange for copulation. The flycatcher is a frequent victim of brood parasitism by brown-headed cowbirds. Males establish and aggressively defend territory during breeding season. While defending, males raise their crest and fan their tail out. They will also pump their tail and snap their beak. Males will chase other males out of their territory by flying after them. Once nestlings are present, they will also chase off other bird species. Courtship involves the male fluffing his crest and chest feathers, fanning the tail, and engaging in a fluttery flight while singing to a female.

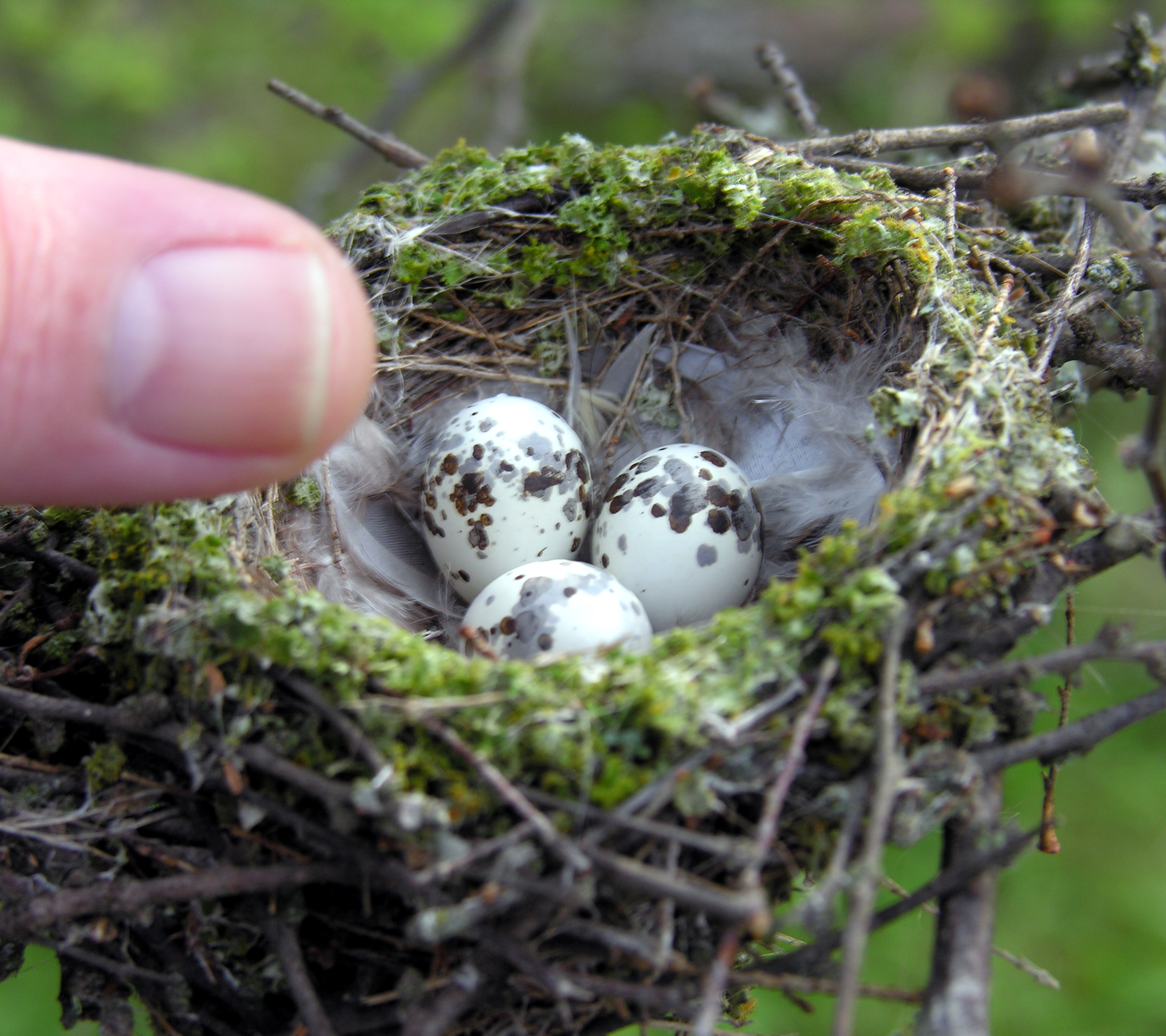
Nest with thumb for size comparison

Males then choose a nesting site, and females begin construction. The vermilion flycatcher's nest is a shallow cup made of small twigs and soft materials, lined with feathers; the nest's rim is often covered with lichen. Spiderwebs may be used to bind the nest together. Females use a rocking motion of their body to shape the nest during construction. Even after construction, the female will continue to add insulating material, such as plant materials, hair, fur, or man-made materials like string. Average nest sizes are about 64–76 mm (2.5–3.0 in) across, 25–51 mm (0.98–2.01 in) tall, and with a cup depth of less than 25 mm (0.98 in). Nests are typically located within 6 ft (1.8 m) of the ground; the nest is placed in the horizontal fork of a tree branch. About 12% of nests are reused, and old nests may be raided for materials for new nests.

Egg-laying begins in March and runs through June; eggs are laid once a day in the early morning. Eggs are ovate and approximately 17 mm (0.67 in) × 13 mm (0.51 in). They average 1.6 g (0.06 oz) in weight, which is about 11% of the female's body mass. They are a dull whitish color and have large brown splotches in a wreath pattern on the larger end, though egg coloration varies. Spotting may be more intense, and the base color may be creamy or even tan or brown. Clutches usually contain two or three eggs but may occasionally include up to four. Eggs are incubated solely by the female for 13–15 days. The male feeds the female while she incubates eggs, though females never beg for food. Feedings are sometimes followed by copulation. The female is very attentive while in the nest. The young are altricial, meaning they are incapable of fending for themselves after birth. Both parents feed the chicks, although the male may tend to fledglings while the female builds another nest. Nests may be reused during the same season, but this is uncommon; one study found that only 12% of nests were reused, and only if they had been successful in raising a brood. Re-using nests saves time and energy but perhaps at the cost of a higher parasite load. Nestlings open their eyes four days after hatching. The young are ready to leave the nest 15 days after hatching. All young generally fledge on the same day, although some may leave a day earlier. If the nest is disturbed, nestlings older than 11 days will abandon the nest prematurely. There are usually two broods per year, although three are possible.

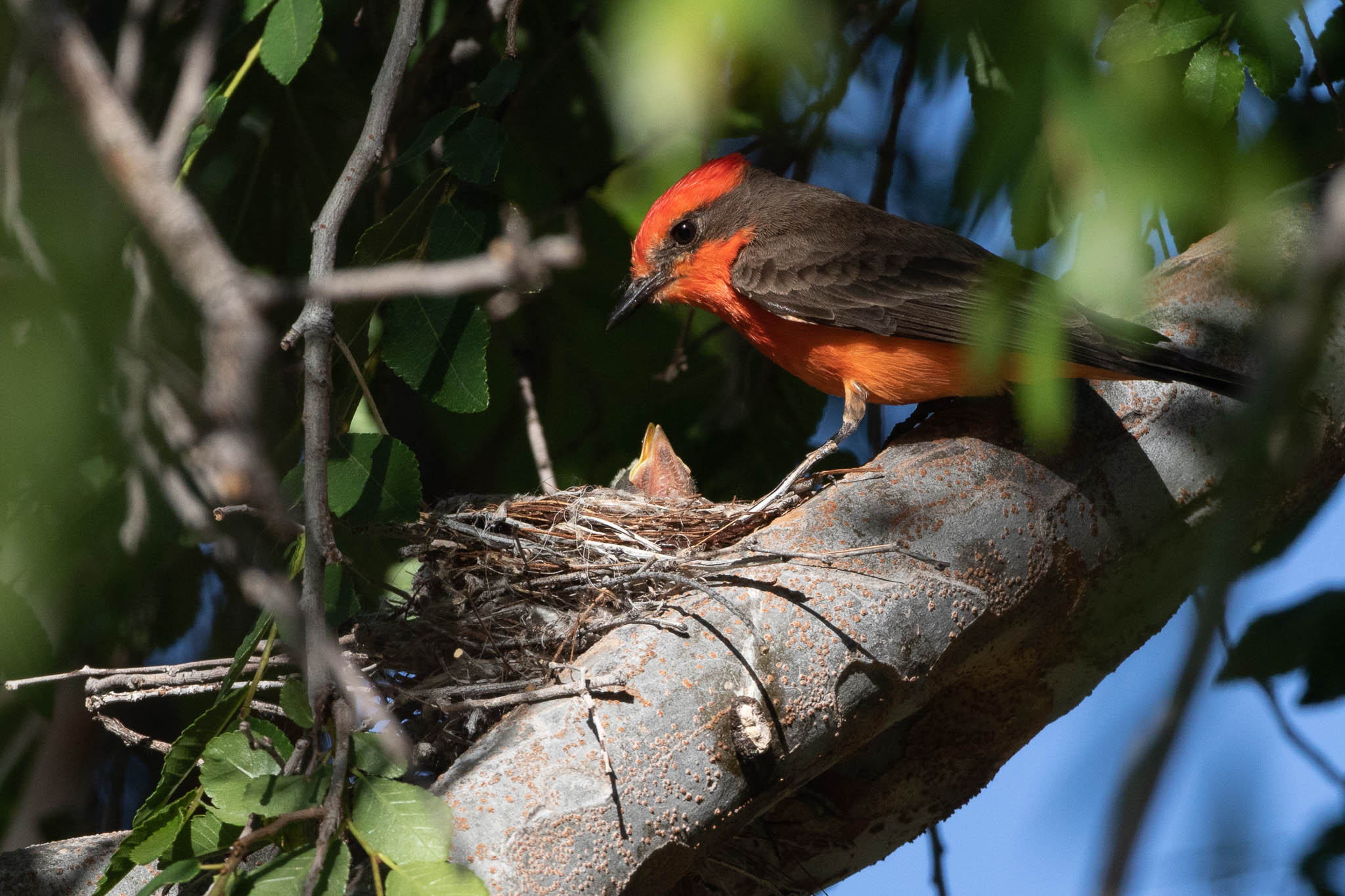
Male at nest

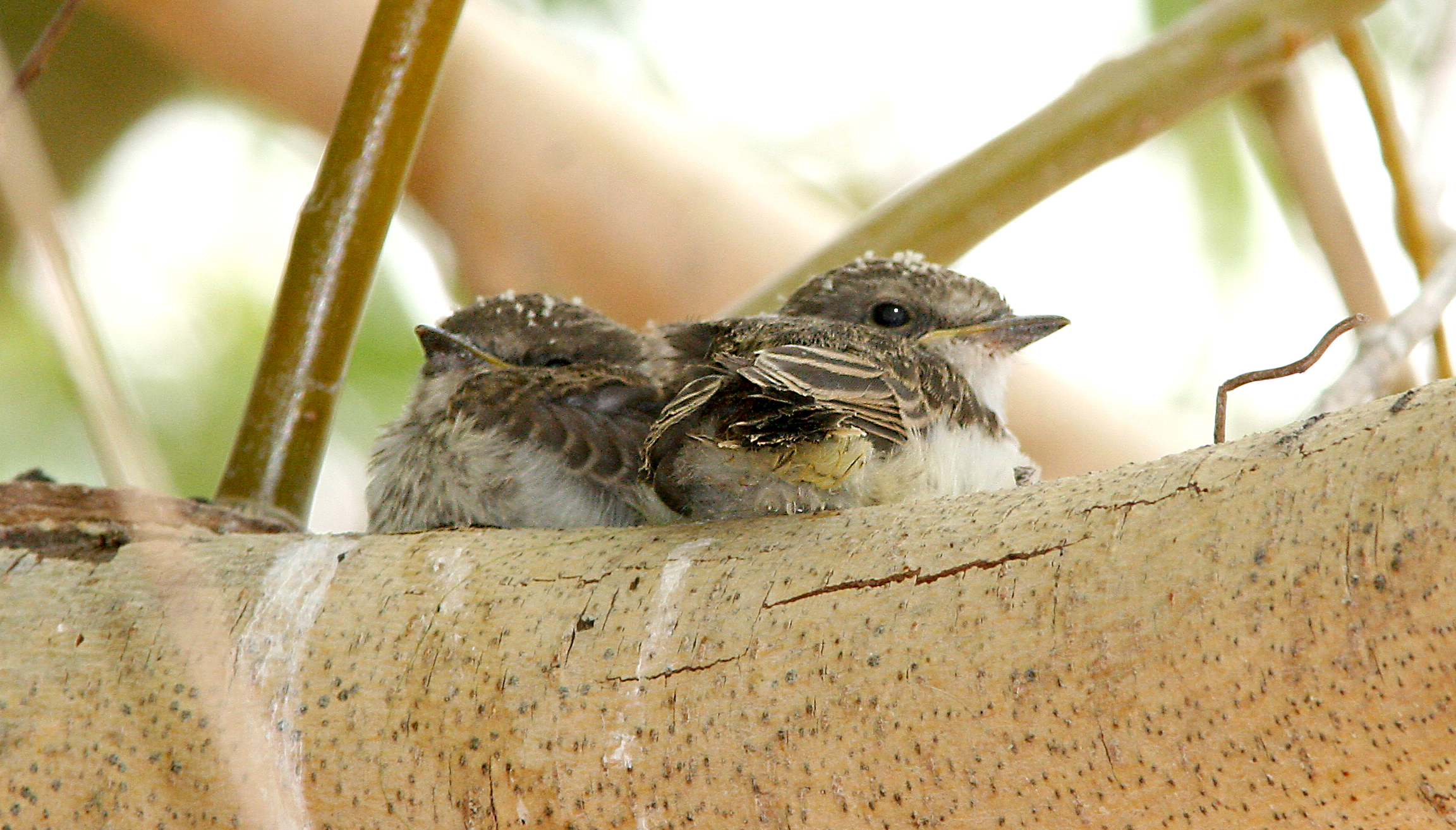
Nestlings, who have yet to hit their first juvenile molt

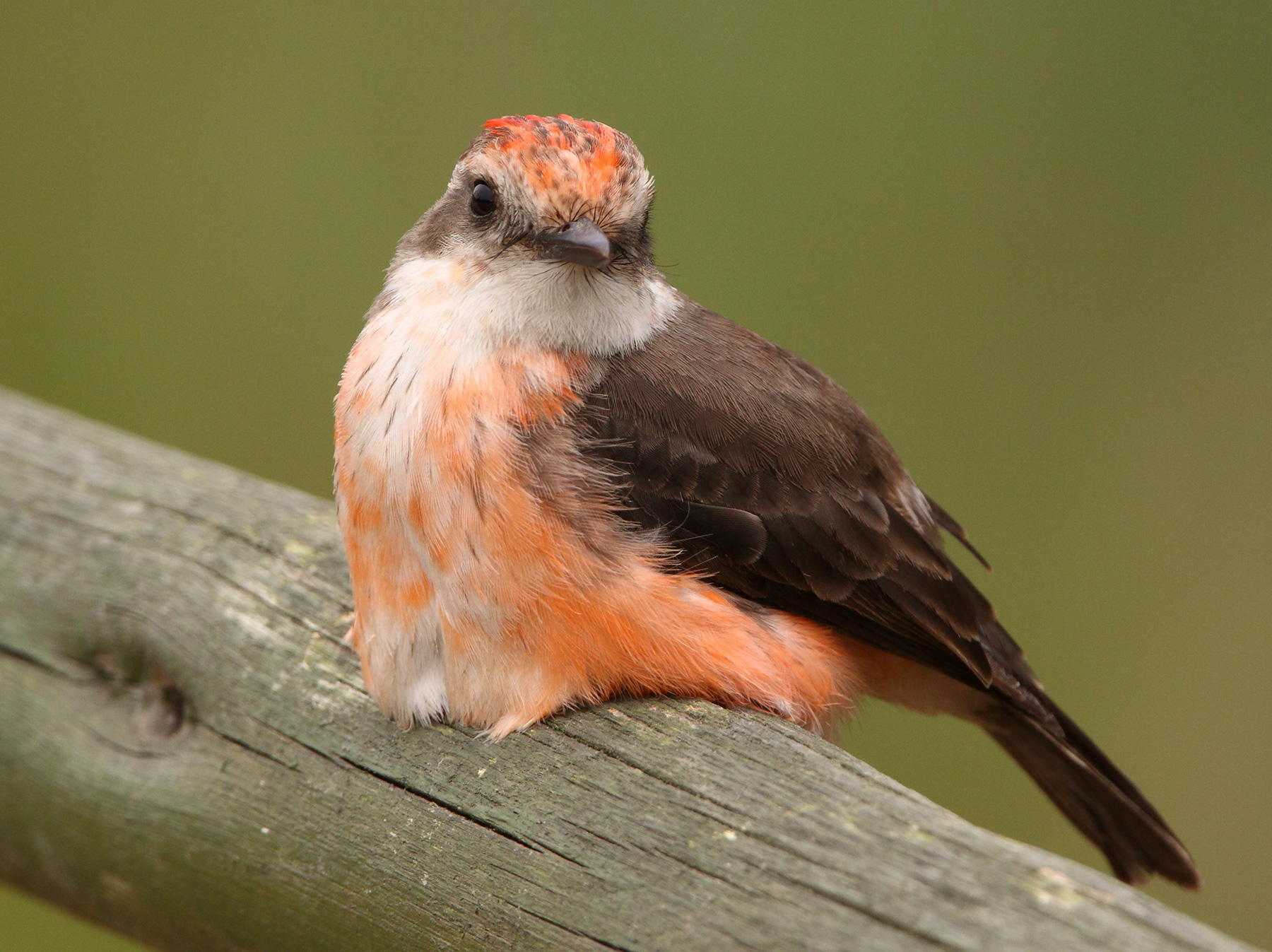
Juvenile male P. o. obscurus in Lima, Peru, showing off the lighter juvenile plumage

=== Feeding ===
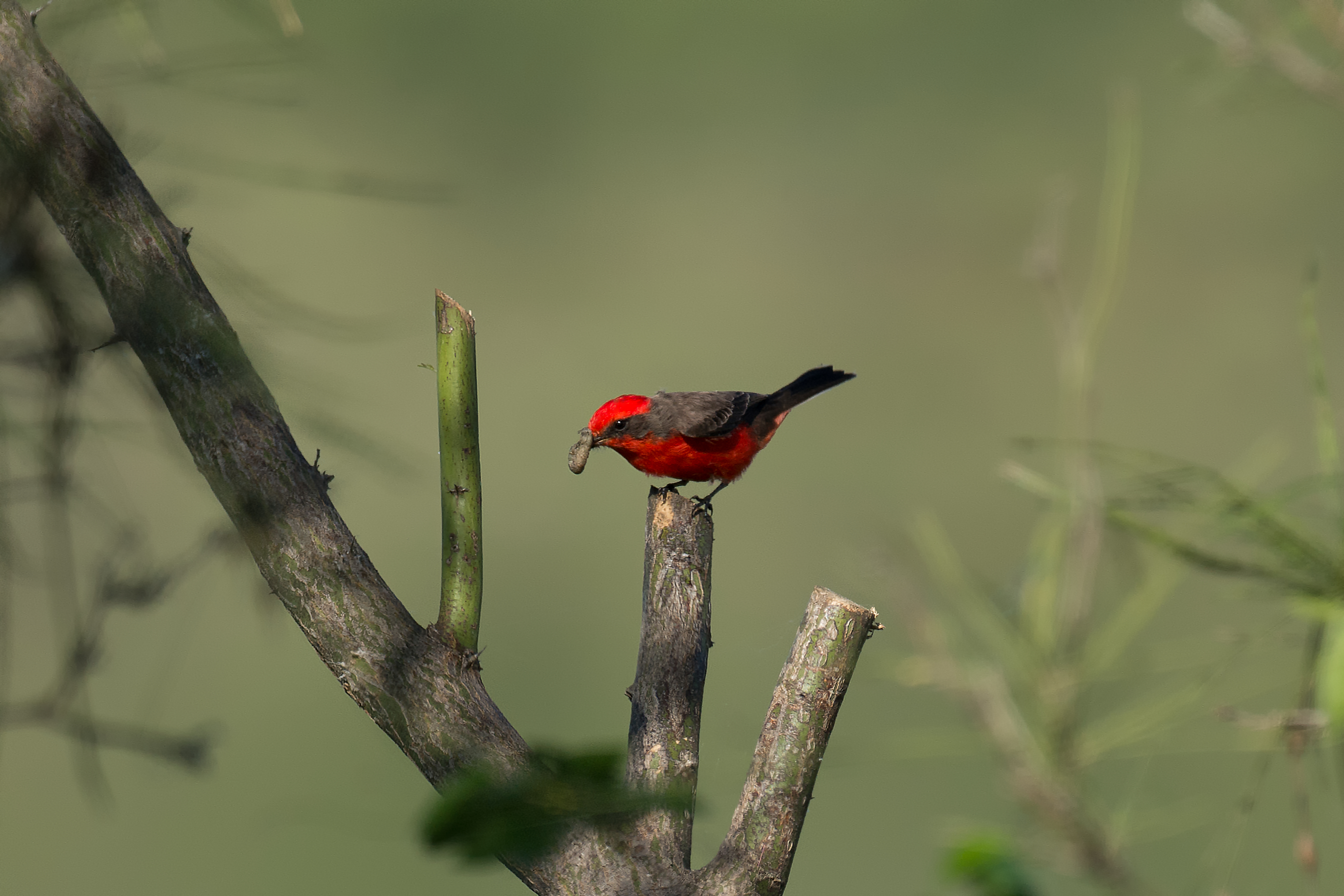
With freshly caught insect prey in Texas

The vermilion flycatcher feeds mostly on insects such as flies, grasshoppers and beetles—though the exact composition of the diet is poorly studied. These are usually taken in mid-air, after a short sally flight from a perch. It is an opportunistic feeder, and has been observed eating small fish, though it is not known to eat plant material. Bees may also be taken as forage. Non-digestible insect parts are regurgitated as pellets. While waiting for insects, they will sit on thin branches and pump their tail up and down. While active, about 90% of their day is spent perching, and only 4–11% is spent chasing prey. Once they have spotted prey, they jump up from their perch and give chase. If insects are missed on the first attempt, the bird is capable of quite a nimble flight to catch them. Once caught, the insects may be beaten before being swallowed whole. Occasionally, insects will be caught on the ground. Otherwise, most prey is caught within 3 m (9.8 ft) of the ground and rarely above water.

=== Survival ===
The predators of the vermilion flycatcher are not well known. Unusual reports of predation include by a scrub-jay, and a group of live nestlings eaten by fire ants. The oldest recorded individual lived to five and a half years, but otherwise, lifespan data is lacking, as is data about mortality causes. Yearly nesting success (the percentage of laid eggs which were raised to fledglings) in a Texas study varied from 59 to 80%. Half of the lost nests contained eggs and half contained young. The causes of failure included nest abandonment and egg infertility. A similar study in Ecuador showed success rates from 20 to 59%.

Several ectoparasites affect the species, Dermanyssus mites being common. A 2008 study found that mites did not greatly affect nesting success, nor did nesting reuse greatly enhance mite populations. Fledglings were successfully raised even in infested nests, while nearby, un-infested nests, did not raise any fledglings. Though not directly parasitic, flies may lay their eggs in nests, providing a home for their larva.

Although the diseases of the vermilion flycatcher are not well studied, the diseases of the birds of the Galapagos are known, and these diseases may have affected the closely related San Cristóbal flycatcher. Introduced and destructive diseases include avian malaria, Marek's disease, Newcastle disease, and many others. Avian pox viruses and crop canker (caused by Trichomanes gallinae) may have directly contributed to the extinction of the Galapagos sister species.

== Relationship to humans ==
The vermilion flycatcher is a favorite with birders, but it is not generally kept in aviculture as the males tend to lose their vermilion coloration when in captivity. This is likely a diet-based effect, as maintaining bright red coloration in birds requires substantial quantities of yellow precursor zeaxanthin molecules which are then metabolized into red pigment. This acts as an indicator of genetic fitness to potential mates, as a bright male is using his diet-based coloration to show off his ability to survive and catch food.

The Tucson Bird Alliance (formerly Tucson Audubon Society) of Tucson, Arizona, publishes an eponymous journal named for the Vermilion Flycatcher.

== Status ==
Because of its enormous range and sizable population—with a population estimated ranging between 5,000,000 and 50,000,000 individuals—the vermilion flycatcher is listed as a species of least concern by the International Union for Conservation of Nature. Its overall numbers are declining; between 1966 and 2007, populations declined an average of 1.7% per year. Texas populations are declining faster, at 2.6% per year. Once prolific in southern California, it has become increasingly rare, although it is expanding into new areas such as Florida and Oklahoma. Arizona populations are increasing, at a rate of 2.2% per year. Vermilion flycatchers have adapted to human structures by increasingly nesting in parks and golf courses. However, the increased productivity of these areas may be outweighed by an increased presence of brown-headed cowbirds—whose parasitic young leave less food for flycatcher young—as well as increased nest predation. Habitat destruction is a major concern for the flycatcher, especially in riparian areas. A prime example is along the Lower Colorado River Valley, where changes in water management combined with the destruction of cottonwood-willow riparian habitat have led to the loss of almost all breeding and foraging areas.

The San Cristóbal flycatcher, which was once considered part of the species, was endemic to the Galápagos Islands but went extinct sometime between 1987 and 2012. The Darwin's flycatcher, which was also once part of the species, is considered a near-threatened species by the International Union for Conservation of Nature.
