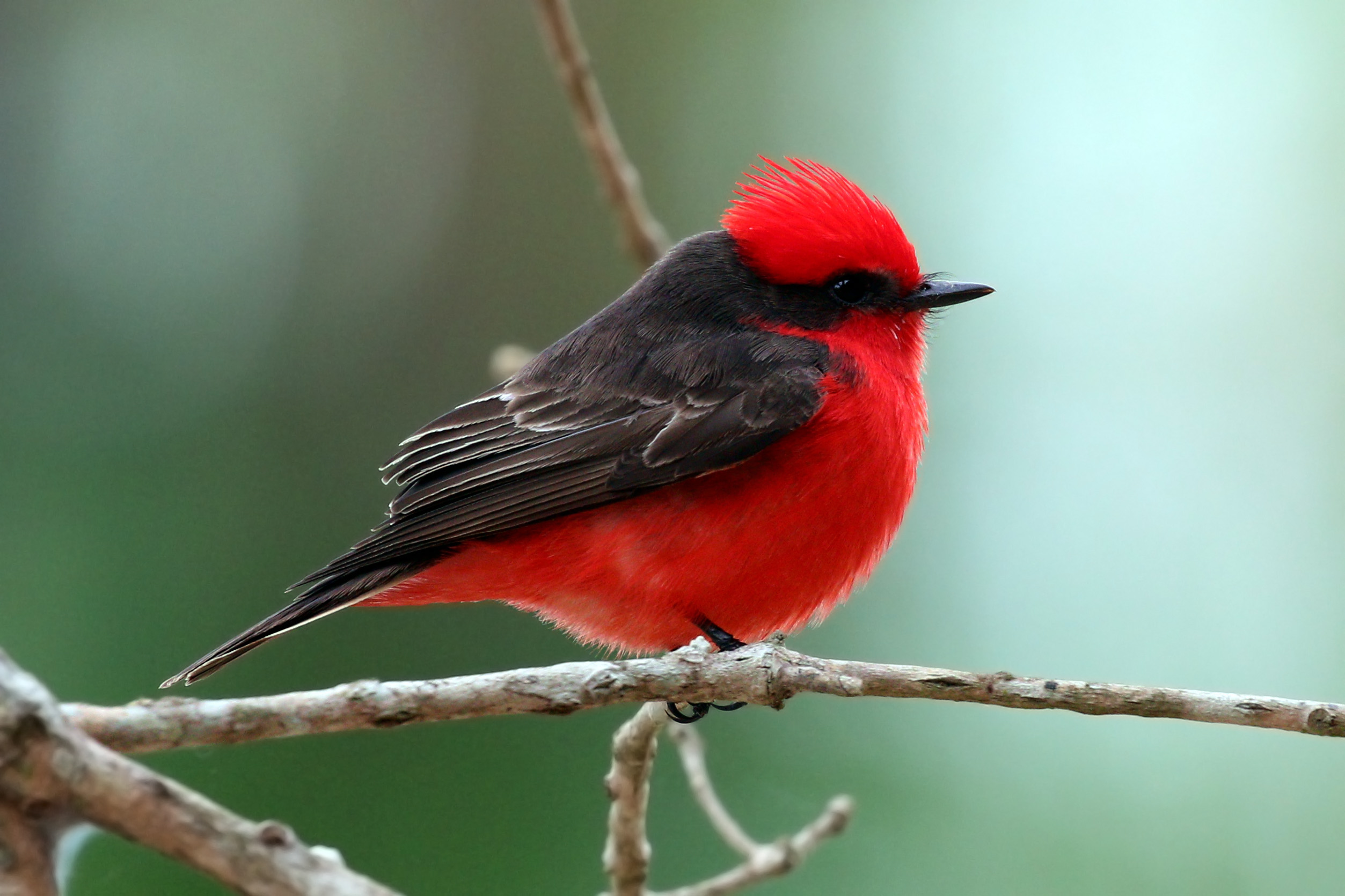
- Scarlet flycatcher (Pyrocephalus rubinus)

Scientific classification
- Kingdom: Animalia
- Phylum: Chordata
- Class: Aves
- Order: Passeriformes
- Family: Tyrannidae
- Genus: Pyrocephalus; Gould, 1838

Type species
- Muscicapa coronata Gmelin, 1789

Species
- See text

= Pyrocephalus =

Genus of birds in the tyrant flycatcher family

Pyrocephalus is a genus of bird in the tyrant flycatcher family, Tyrannidae.

The genus was introduced by the English ornithologist and bird artist John Gould in 1839 in Charles Darwin's Zoology of the Voyage of H.M.S. Beagle. (Note: Some taxonomists date the publication to 1838. Although the title page to Aves. Part III is dated 1841, the volume was issued in five parts. Page 44 containing the text was issued in 1839 but plates VI and VII were issued in 1838 and have captions that include the generic name Pyrocephalus.) The type species was designated as the scarlet flycatcher (Pyrocephalus rubinus) by the English zoologist George Robert Gray in 1840. The name Pyrocephalus combines the Ancient Greek purrhos meaning "flame-coloured" or "red" and -kephalos meaning "-headed".

== Taxonomy ==
The tyrant flycatcher family, the Tyrannidae, is a group of passerine birds present only in the New World, and its members are generally drab in coloration. Within it, the subfamily Fluvicolinae comprises the genera Pyrocephalus, Contopus, Empidonax, and Sayornis. They likely shared a common ancestor in the Contopus or Xenotriccus genus before diversifying. The Pyrocephalus are most closely related to the Sayornis in terms of morphology, but genetic analysis shows that they may be more closely related to the Fluvicola. The vermilion flycatcher likely evolved around 1.15–million years ago (mya), with the species on the Galápagos Islands having split off around 0.82–mya. The South American species/subspecies diverged about 0.56–mya.

=== Species ===
The genus contains three species:

Image	Scientific name	Common name	Distribution
	Pyrocephalus rubinus	Scarlet flycatcher	Southeastern Bolivia and Brazil, Paraguay to Argentina and Uruguay
	Pyrocephalus obscurus	Vermilion flycatcher	Almost all of Mexico; it extends north into the southwestern United States, and south to scattered portions of Central America, parts of northwestern and central South America
	Pyrocephalus nanus	Brujo flycatcher	Galápagos Islands
