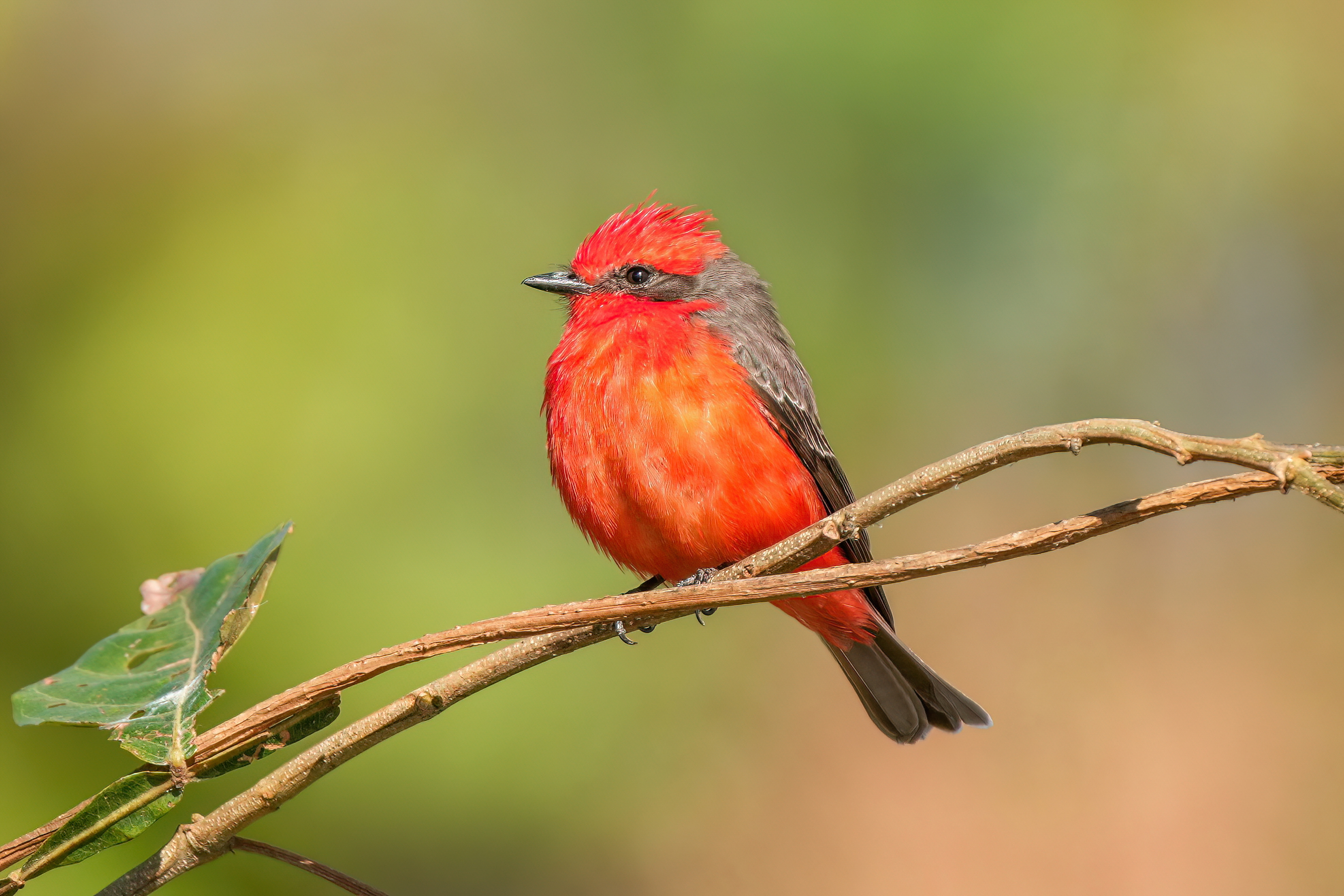
- in the Pantanal, Brazil

Conservation status
- Least Concern (IUCN 3.1)

Scientific classification
- Kingdom: Animalia
- Phylum: Chordata
- Class: Aves
- Order: Passeriformes
- Family: Tyrannidae
- Genus: Pyrocephalus
- Species: P. rubinus

Binomial name
- Pyrocephalus rubinus (Boddaert, 1783)
- Breeding Year-round Non-Breeding

= Scarlet flycatcher =

Species of bird

The scarlet flycatcher or austral vermilion flycatcher (Pyrocephalus rubinus) is a passerine bird in the family Tyrannidae, the tyrant flycatchers. It is found in Argentina, Bolivia, Brazil, Colombia, Ecuador, Paraguay, Peru, and Uruguay.

== Taxonomy and systematics ==
The scarlet flycatcher was described by the French polymath Georges-Louis Leclerc, Comte de Buffon in 1779 in his Histoire Naturelle des Oiseaux. The bird was also illustrated in a hand-colored plate engraved by François-Nicolas Martinet in the Planches Enluminées D'Histoire Naturelle which was produced under the supervision of Edme-Louis Daubenton to accompany Buffon's text. Neither the plate caption nor Buffon's description included a scientific name but in 1783 the Dutch naturalist Pieter Boddaert coined the binomial name Muscicapa rubinus in his catalogue of the Planches Enluminées. The type locality was restricted to Tefé on the Amazon River by the American ornithologist John T. Zimmer in 1941. The scarlet flycatcher is now placed in the genus Pyrocephalus that was introduced in 1839 by the English ornithologist and bird artist John Gould. The generic name combines the Ancient Greek purrhos meaning "flame-colored" or "red" and -kephalos meaning "-headed". The specific epithet rubinus is Medieval Latin for "ruby-colored".

The further taxonomy of the scarlet flycatcher is unsettled. It was long considered to be the nominate subspecies of the vermilion flycatcher sensu lato. As of early 2025 the North and South American Classification Committees of the American Ornithological Society (AOS), the Clements taxonomy, and BirdLife International's Handbook of the Birds of the World (HBW) continue this classification, though HBW calls the species the common vermilion flycatcher. However, a molecular phylogenetic study published in 2016 suggested that it be treated as a full species. The IOC adopted the split in January 2017. As part of the split the IOC assigned the binomial Pyrocephalus obscurus to the now-reduced vermilion flycatcher. A study published in 2020 offered further support and was later cited by the IOC.

The scarlet flycatcher Pyrocephalus rubinus as defined by the IOC is monotypic, and this article follows that treatment.

== Description ==
The scarlet flycatcher is about 14 cm (5.5 in) long. and weighs 12 to 15 g (0.42 to 0.53 oz).Adult males have an intense poppy red forehead and crown down to the eye. Their lores and ear coverts are dark grayish brown and form a "mask". Their nape, upperparts, and tail are blackish and their rump blackish brown. Their wings are blackish with paler edges on the coverts and tertials. The lower part of their face, their throat, and their underparts are a slightly lighter shade of poppy red than the crown, with sometimes an orangey tinge. Adult females have a grayish brown head with grayish lores and an indistinct whitish supercilium. Their back and rump are the same grayish brown as the head and the uppertail coverts and tail are a duskier grayish brown. Their wings are mostly a darker grayish brown than the back. Their throat and underparts are dull white with grayish brown streaks throughout and sometimes a pale yellow tinge on the belly. Both sexes have a dark brown iris, a brownish black bill, and blackish to brownish black legs and feet.

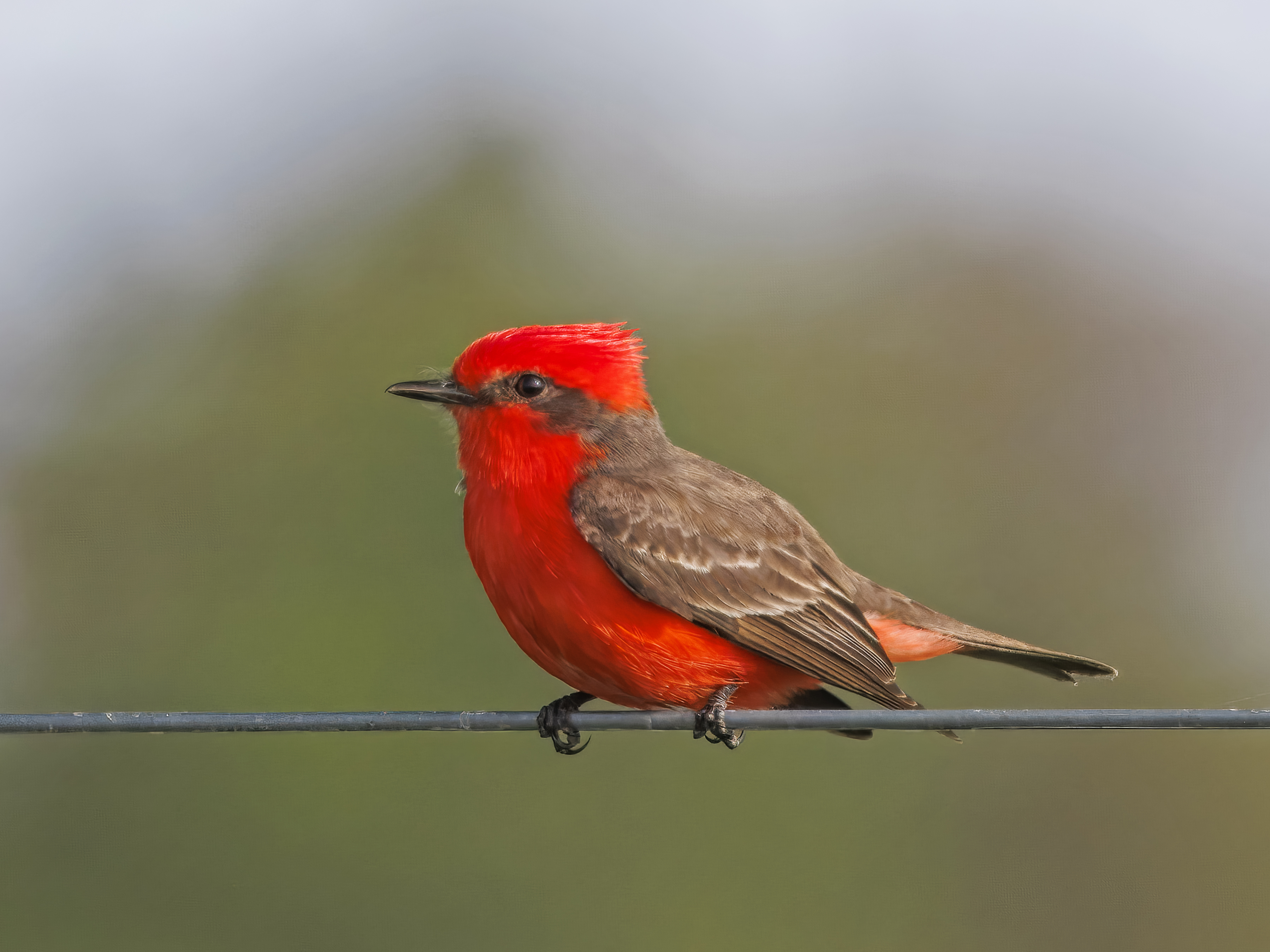
adult male, Uruguay

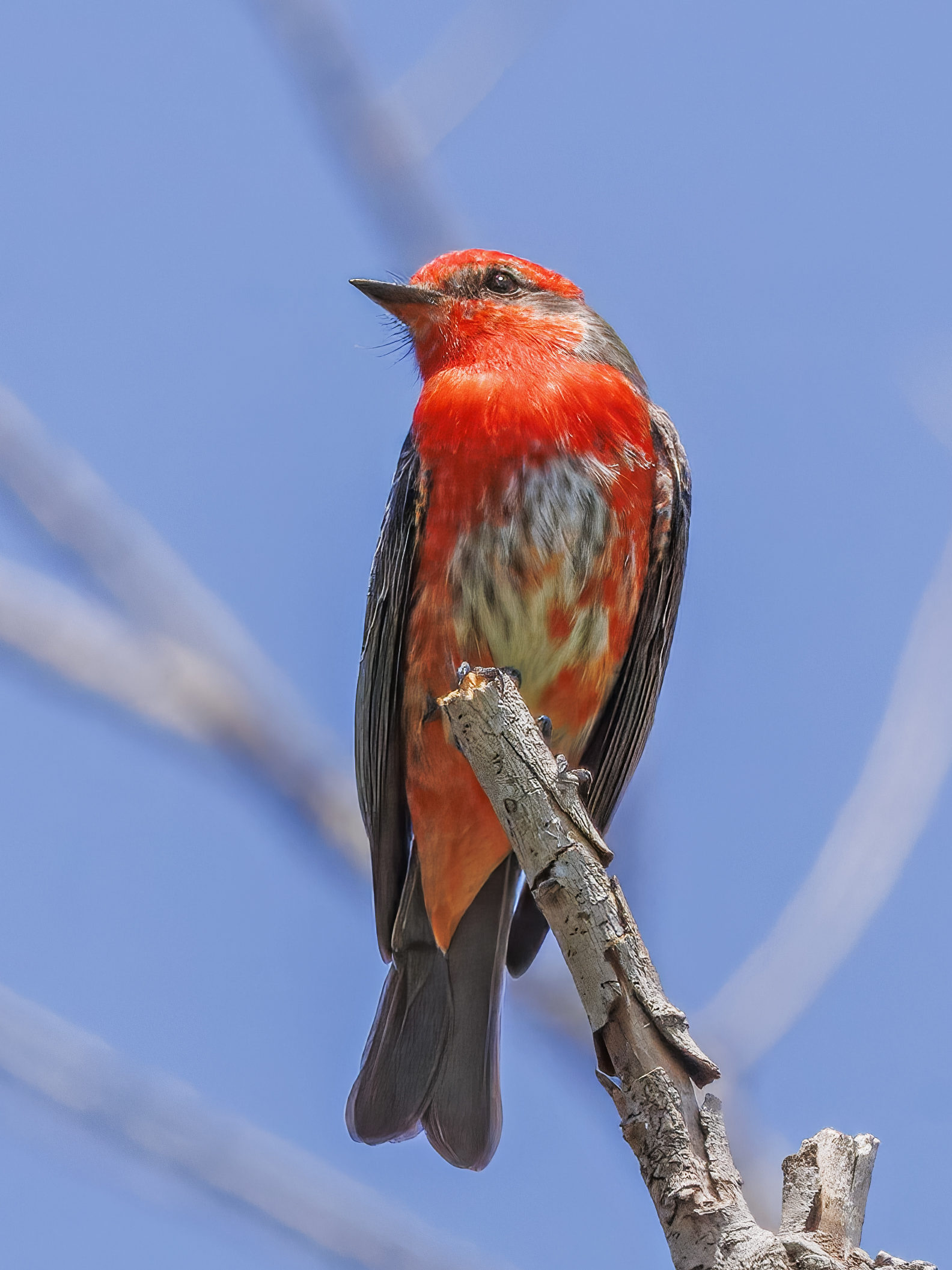
immature male, Argentina

== Distribution and habitat ==
The scarlet flycatcher is found over the course of the year from southeastern Colombia east across central Brazil and south from there through eastern Ecuador, eastern Peru, eastern Bolivia, and southern Brazil into northern Argentina, Paraguay, and Uruguay. (See the Movement section for details.) It inhabits semi-open to open landscapes such as open woodland, the edges of denser woodlands, pastures with scattered trees, and agricultural areas.

== Behavior ==
=== Movement ===
The scarlet flycatcher is highly migratory. It is a year-round resident from eastern Bolivia and far northern Argentina east across Paraguay and southern Brazil. It also breeds further south through Uruguay and Argentina to about Río Negro Province. In the austral winter it vacates the southern breeding range. From there and from within the year-round range it migrates north into most of Amazonian Brazil and Amazonian Peru, Ecuador, and Colombia.

=== Feeding ===
The scarlet flycatcher's diet and foraging behavior are not known in detail. It feeds mostly on insects caught in mid-air with sallies from a perch ("hawking") and also from the ground.

=== Breeding ===
Nothing is known about the scarlet flycatcher's breeding biology. Almost all of the breeding data from the widespread vermilion flycatcher sensu lato are from Arizona.

=== Vocalization ===
The scarlet flycatcher's song is an "extr. high tic-tic-psiieh" whose last part may be upslurred, and its call is an "extr. high psi".

== Status ==
The IUCN follows HBW taxonomy and so has not assessed the scarlet flycatcher separately from the vermilion flycatcher.
