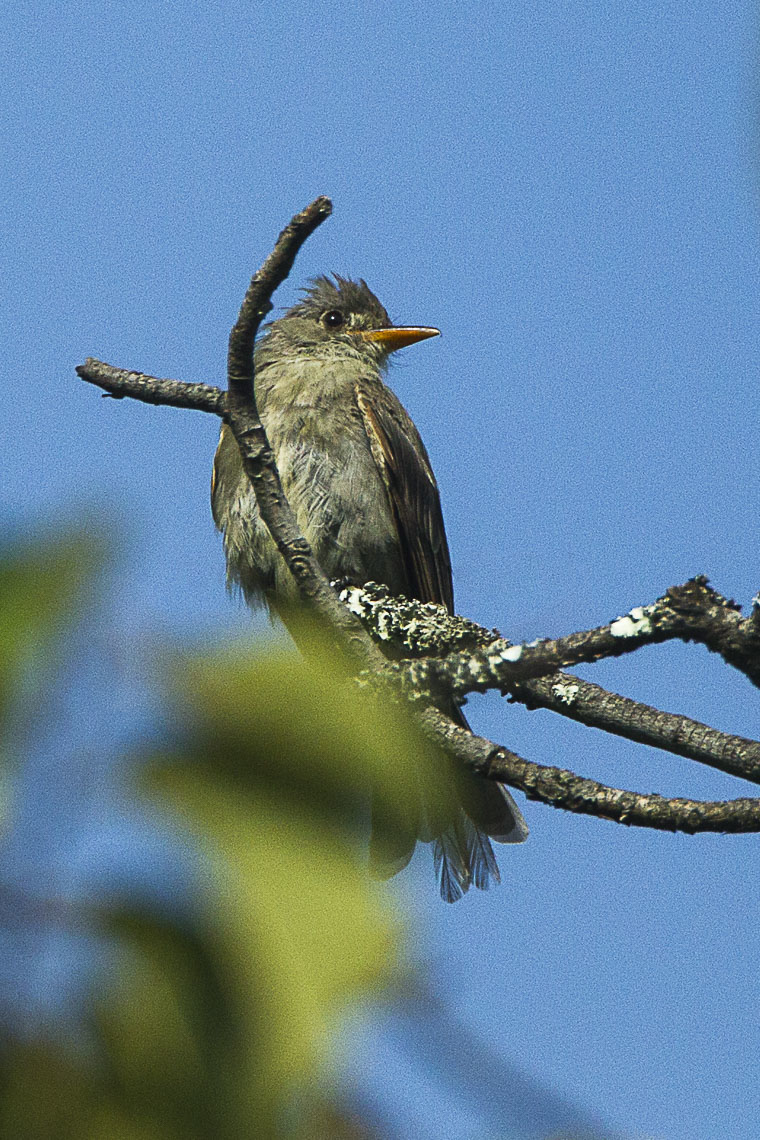

Conservation status
- Least Concern (IUCN 3.1)

Scientific classification
- Kingdom: Animalia
- Phylum: Chordata
- Class: Aves
- Order: Passeriformes
- Family: Tyrannidae
- Genus: Xenotriccus
- Species: X. mexicanus

Binomial name
- Xenotriccus mexicanus (Zimmer, 1938)

= Pileated flycatcher =

Species of bird

The pileated flycatcher (Xenotriccus mexicanus) is a species of bird in the family Tyrannidae, the tyrant flycatchers. It is endemic to Mexico.

== Taxonomy and systematics ==
The pileated flycatcher was originally described as Aechmolophus mexicanus with the genus Aechmolophus being erected for it. What became the type specimen had been misidentified as a western wood pewee (then Myiochanes richardsonii, now Contopus sordidulus). In 1977 its original genus was merged into Xenotriccus which had been erected in 1927. The pileated flycatcher and the belted flycatcher (X. callizonus) are the only members of Xenotriccus.

The pileated flycatcher is monotypic.

== Description ==
The pileated flycatcher is 13.5 to 14.5 cm (5.3 to 5.7 in) long. The species is similar to those of genus Empidonax but is stockier and longer-tailed with a thicker bill. The sexes have the same plumage. Adults have a mostly brownish olive head with a pointed grayish or olive-brown crest, pale lores, and a white teardrop-shaped eye-ring. The crest is usually held erect. Their upperparts are mostly grayish to brownish olive. Their wings are a darker brownish olive than the back, with whitish ends on the coverts that show as two wing bars. They have whitish edges on their secondaries. Their tail is dusky. Their throat is white, their breast white with a gray to olive wash, and their belly white with a yellow tinge. They have a dark iris, a black maxilla, an orange-pink mandible, and dark gray legs and feet. Juveniles have a shorter crest than adults and buff rather than whitish on the wings.

== Distribution and habitat ==
The pileated flycatcher is found in southwestern Mexico from central Michoacán and Morelos southeast to the Isthmus of Tehuantepec in Oaxaca. It primarily inhabits arid scrublands, especially mesquite and thorn forest, and occasionally occurs in somewhat open over-grazed areas. It has also been noted in pine-oak, oak, and fir forests. In elevation it ranges between 900 and 2,000 m (3,000 and 6,600 ft) and perhaps to 3,000 m (9,800 ft).

== Behavior ==
=== Movement ===
The pileated flycatcher is mostly a year-round resident. However, in some areas of Oaxaca it appears to make elevational changes between summer and winter.

=== Feeding ===
The pileated flycatcher feeds on insects, though details are lacking. It sits somewhat erect on a low perch and makes sallies from the perch to capture prey in mid-air ("hawking") or to snatch it from foliage.

=== Breeding ===
The pileated flycatcher's nest is an open cup made from fine grasses and other plant fibers held with spider web in a branch fork within a thorny thicket. The clutch is two or three eggs. The species' breeding season, incubation period, time to fledging, and details of parental care are not known.

=== Vocalization ===
The pileated flycatcher's song is a "sputtered and intensifying 'p'iweer pi-pi-pirrr-i-it' cheeu', or 'wheeu whirr-rr-rr-rr-whee-u' reminiscent of a sport referee's whistle". Its calls include "nasal 'brree' notes, richer more explosive 'cheeoo' or 'cheeup' notes, [and a] harsher 'whee whee-eu' whee-eu' whee-eu' ".

== Status ==
The IUCN originally in 1994 assessed the pileated flycatcher as Near Threatened but since 2013 as being of Least Concern. Its estimated population of 20,000 to 50,000 mature individuals is believed to be decreasing. "Much suitable habitat has been affected by agricultural expansion, including conversion to coffee and citrus plantations and cattle-ranching." There are very few protected areas within its range.
