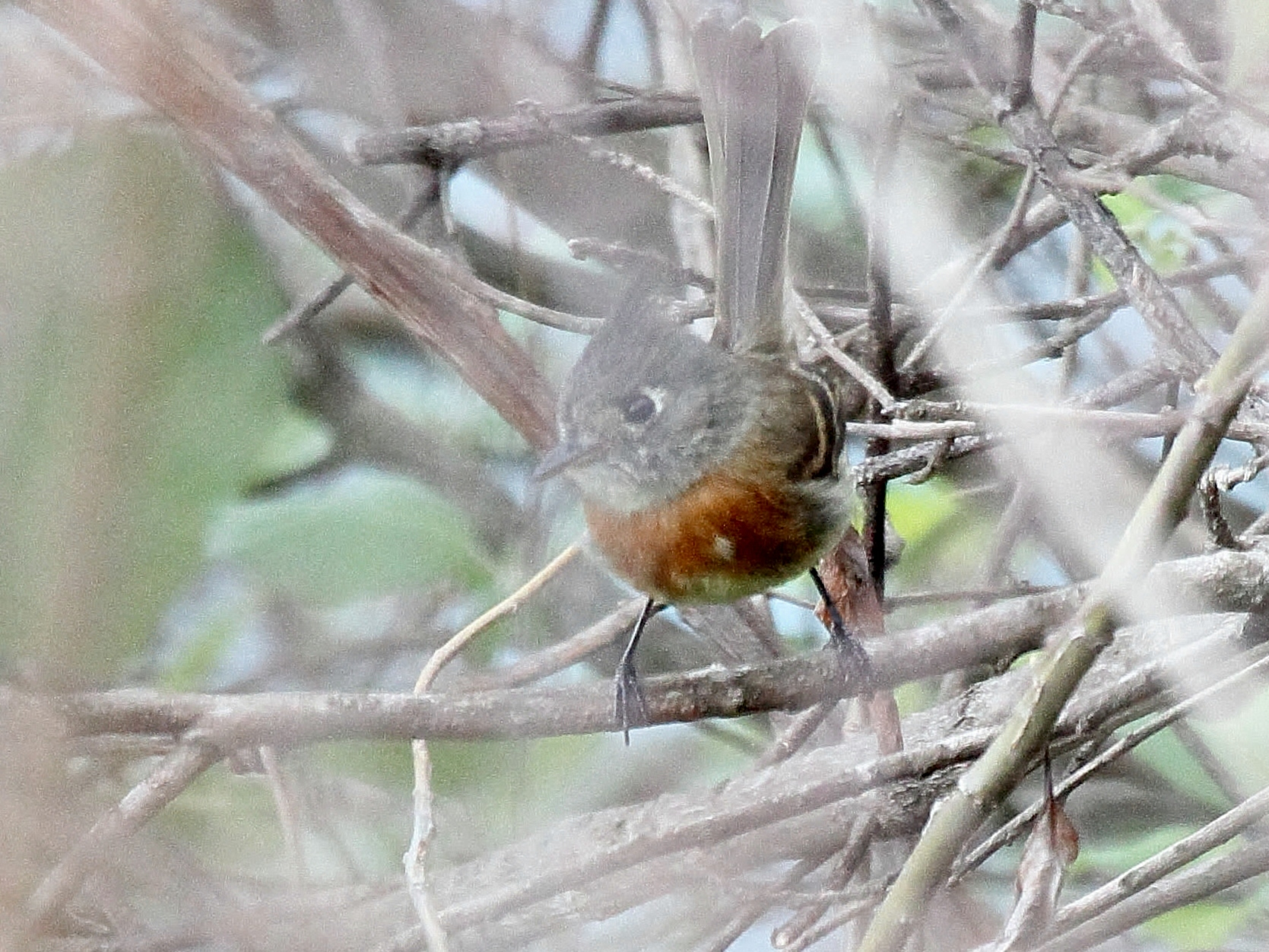

Conservation status
- Least Concern (IUCN 3.1)

Scientific classification
- Kingdom: Animalia
- Phylum: Chordata
- Class: Aves
- Order: Passeriformes
- Family: Tyrannidae
- Genus: Xenotriccus
- Species: X. callizonus

Binomial name
- Xenotriccus callizonus Dwight & Griscom, 1927

= Belted flycatcher =

Species of bird

The belted flycatcher (Xenotriccus callizonus) is a species of bird in the family Tyrannidae, the tyrant flycatchers. It is known in El Salvador, Guatemala, and Mexico and possibly occurs in Honduras.

== Taxonomy and systematics ==
The belted flycatcher was originally described and its genus Xenotriccus erected for it in 1927. It and the pileated flycatcher (X. mexicanus) are the only members of the genus.

The belted flycatcher is monotypic.

== Description ==
The belted flycatcher is 11.5 to 13 cm (4.5 to 5.1 in) long; one male weighed 13.0 g (0.46 oz) and a female 11.5 g (0.41 oz). The sexes have the same plumage. Adult males have a mostly brownish olive head with a pointed blackish brown or olive gray crest and a wide white or pale lemon teardrop-shaped eye-ring. Their upperparts are mostly brownish olive with pale cinnamon brown uppertail coverts. Their wings are dusky brown with wide pale cinnamon ends on the coverts that show as two wing bars. They have pale cinnamon edges on their tertials and the same color as a panel on their secondaries. Their tail is dusky brown with pale gray edges on the outer webs of the outer feathers. Their throat is yellowish white. They have a wide band of cinnamon rufous across their breast and the rest of their underparts are pale lemon. They have a dark iris, a black maxilla, an orange or yellow orange mandible, and dark gray legs and feet. Juveniles have similar plumage to adults but have a shorter crest.

== Distribution and habitat ==
According to most sources the belted flycatcher is found in highlands from central Chiapas in southern Mexico south through central Guatemala and slightly into far northwestern El Salvador. However, one source includes extreme western Honduras in its range. The species inhabits dense brush and scrub in the understory of semiarid to semihumid woodlands in the tropical zone. It especially favors oak and pine-oak forest. In elevation it ranges between 1,200 and 2,000 m (3,900 and 6,600 ft).

== Behavior ==
=== Movement ===
The belted flycatcher is a year-round resident.

=== Feeding ===
The belted flycatcher feeds on insects, though details are lacking. It typically forages singly or in pairs and is not known to join mixed-species feeding flocks. It is secretive and perches in dense vegetation in the forest understory. It makes sallies from the perch to capture prey in mid-air ("hawking") or to snatch it from foliage.

=== Breeding ===
The belted flycatcher appears to be socially monogamous but limited other information is known about its breeding biology. Three nests are known; all were discovered in the same area of Mexico in early June. They were open cups made from fine grasses and other plant fibers and lined with thin rootlets and other thin fibers. They were placed in branch forks in bushes low to the ground and held there with spider web. Some fibers straggled from the bottom of the nests. One nest contained three eggs that were whitish with brownish spots and another contained three young which flew when the researcher approached. The third had three young near it. It appeared that the female alone incubated the clutch and brooded nestlings during which the male fed her, and both parents fed the nestlings and the recently fledged young. The incubation period was not determined; fledging from the one nest occurred 14 days after hatch.

=== Vocalization ===
The belted flycatcher's song is "a rolling nasal pip-pip-pi'pi'pi'pi'pweee!". Its calls are an "emphatic nasal peeurrr! [and] a 2-part pee'wierr!". Males jerk their tail while calling. Mates have a peer-peer contact call when the male approaches the nest.

== Status ==
The IUCN originally in 1994 assessed the belted flycatcher as Near Threatened but since July 2019 as being of Least Concern. Its estimated population of 20,000 to 50,000 mature individuals is believed to be decreasing. "Forests are subject to intense clearance throughout the region, owing principally to coffee cultivation and logging, as well as uncontrolled fires. The species's preferred habitats, oak forest and woodland, have suffered heavy deforestation throughout the range." It is considered Threatened under Mexican law and "rare and local" in northern Central America.
