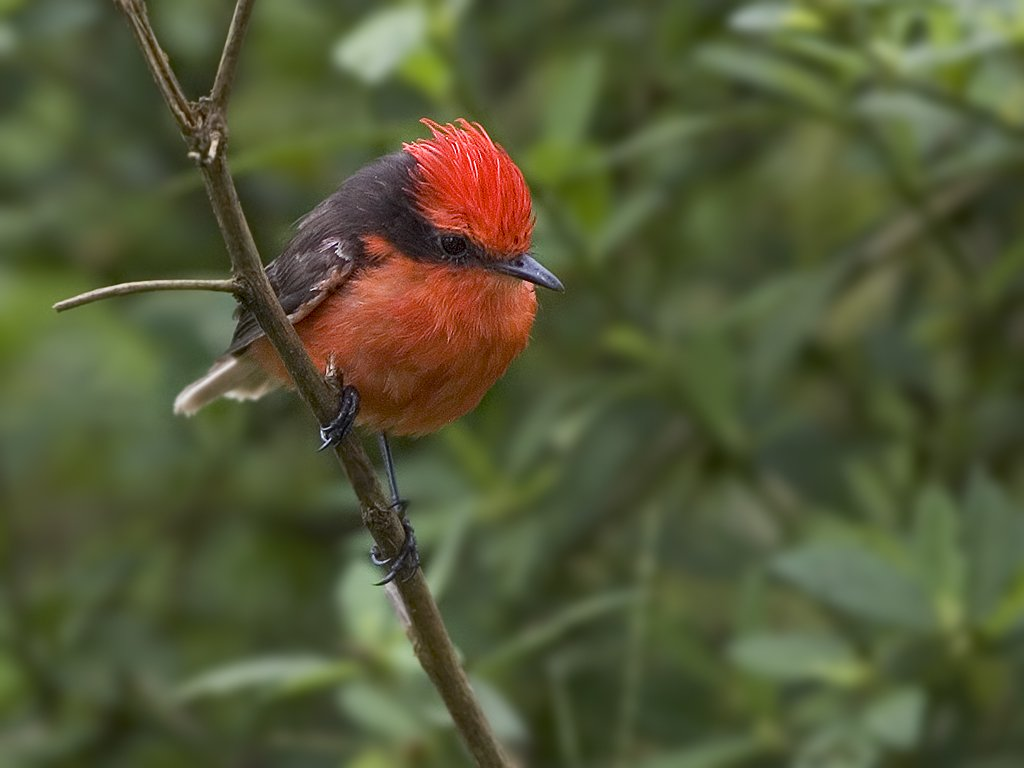
- Male
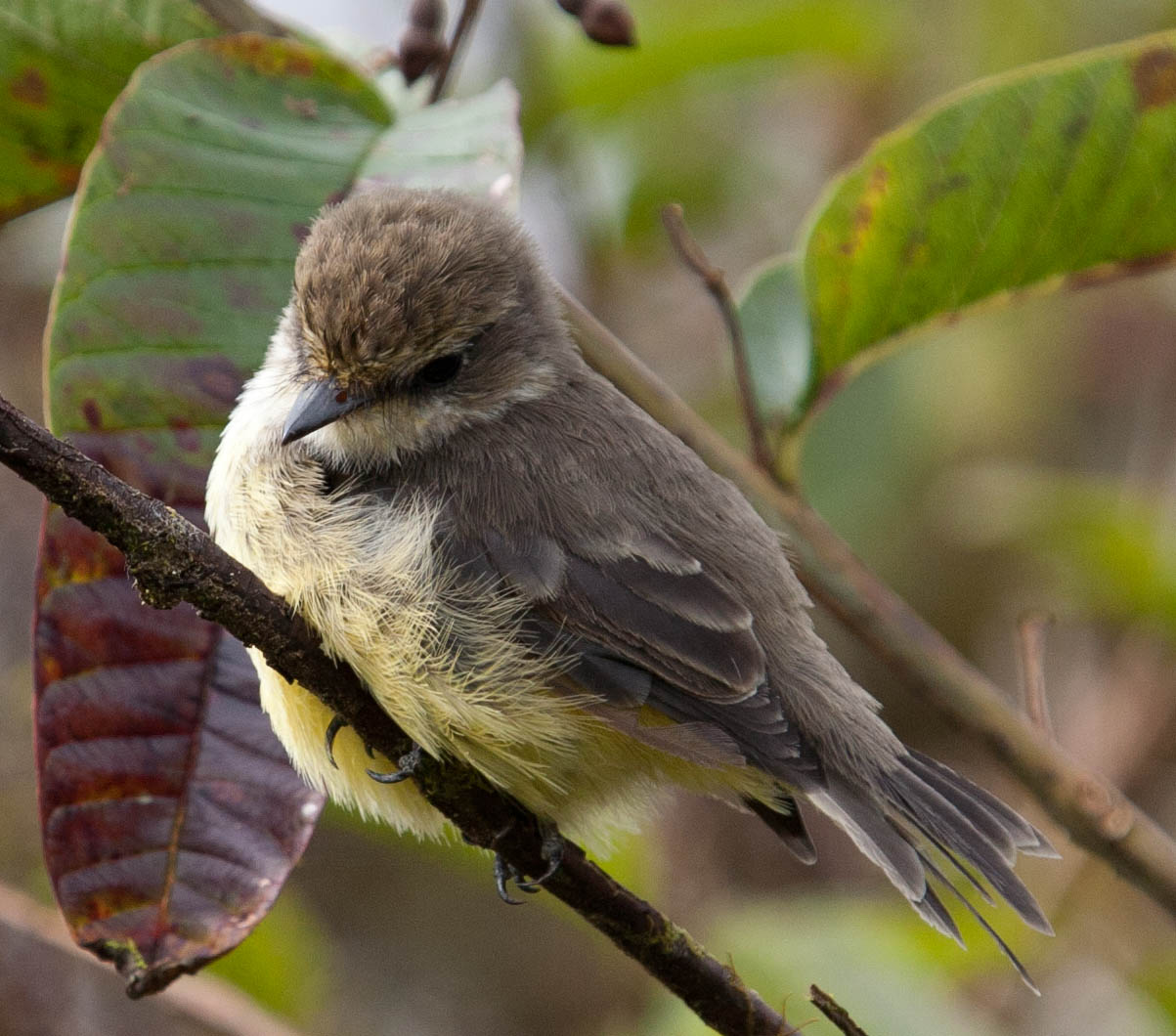
- Female

Conservation status
- Near Threatened (IUCN 3.1)

Scientific classification
- Kingdom: Animalia
- Phylum: Chordata
- Class: Aves
- Order: Passeriformes
- Family: Tyrannidae
- Genus: Pyrocephalus
- Species: P. nanus

Binomial name
- Pyrocephalus nanus Gould, 1838

Synonyms
- Pyrocephalus carolensis Ridgway, 1894; Pyrocephalus intercedens Ridgway, 1894; Pyrocephalus abingdoni Ridgway, 1894; Pyrocephalus nanus nanus Snodgrass & Heller, 1904; Pyrocephalus nanus abingdoni Snodgrass & Heller, 1904; Pyrocephalus rubinus nanus (Gould, 1839)

= Brujo flycatcher =

Species of bird in the Galapagos

The brujo flycatcher (Pyrocephalus nanus) is a Near Threatened species of bird in the family Tyrannidae, the tyrant flycatchers. It is endemic to the Galápagos Islands. It is also known as Darwin's flycatcher or the little vermilion flycatcher.

== Taxonomy ==
The brujo flycatcher was formally described in 1838 as Pyrocephalus nanus by the English ornithologist John Gould. Gould based his description on specimens collected by Charles Darwin in 1835 when Darwin visited the Galápagos Islands on HMS Beagle. Gould did not specify from which island the specimens had been obtained, but in 1894 the American ornithologist Robert Ridgway designated the locality as James Island (now Santiago Island). The specific epithet nanus is Latin meaning "dwarf". The common name "brujo" is Spanish meaning "witch" or "sorcerer".

Two subspecies are recognised:

- P. n. nanus Gould, J, 1838 – Galapagos (except San Cristóbal)
- † P. n. dubius Gould, J & Gray, GR, 1839 – formerly San Cristóbal Island (Galapagos); extinct, last reported 1987

After many taxonomic changes it was generally recognized as a subspecies of the widespread vermilion flycatcher (P. rubinus sensu lato). A molecular phylogenetic study published in 2016 suggested that it be treated as a full species. BirdLife International's Handbook of the Birds of the World (HBW) recognized the split in 2016. The IOC followed suit in January 2017, the South American Classification Committee of the American Ornithological Society in 2020, the Clements taxonomy in 2021, and the AOS North American Classification Committee in 2022.

During a survey of the San Cristóbal Island in 1929, the ornithologist Albert Kenrick Fisher found that the subspecies P. n. dubius was abundant along the arid western coast to the settlement of Progreso in the highlands. During the next sixty years invasive plants replaced a large part of the endemic vegetation which led to the decline of the insects which were dependent on the endemic plants. When David and Lee Steadman visited San Cristobal Island in the 1980s they described the subspecies as extremely rare. The last reliable sighting was in 1987. A six-month expedition in 1998, failed to find any birds.

== Description ==
The brujo flycatcher is about 13 to 14 cm (5.1 to 5.5 in) long and weighs 11 to 14 g (0.39 to 0.49 oz). Adult males have a bright vermilion, scarlet, or orange forehead and crown down to the eye. Their lores and ear coverts are blackish brown and form a "mask" that continues around their nape. Their upperparts, wings, and tail are blackish brown, with slightly paler remiges and wing coverts. The lower part of their face, their throat, and their underparts are the same shade of red as their crown. Adult females have a grayish brown head with an indistinct grayish supercilium. Their back, rump, wings, and tail are grayish brown that is darkest on the tail. Their throat is whitish. Their underparts progress from pale red on the breast to salmon on the undertail coverts, with thin gray streaks on the breast, sides, and flanks. Both sexes have a dark brown iris, a brownish black bill, and black to brownish black legs and feet.

== Distribution and habitat ==
The brujo flycatcher is found on the major islands of Ecuador's Galápagos archipelago. It inhabits the interior and edges of somewhat humid forest in the highlands. Typical forest species are of genera Scalesia, Tournefortia, and Zanthoxylum.

== Behavior ==
=== Movement ===
The brujo flycatcher is a year-round resident.

=== Feeding ===
The brujo flycatcher feeds mostly on flying and terrestrial insects and also includes other arthropods in its diet, though details are lacking. It sits on an exposed perch and chases or pounces on prey from it.

=== Breeding ===
The brujo flycatcher breeds between December and May, the rainy season. Its nest is a cup made from moss and lichens placed in a tree or shrub. Its clutch is three eggs. Nothing else is known about the species' breeding biology.

=== Vocalization ===
As of April 2025 xeno-canto had seven recordings of the brujo flycatcher vocalizations and the Cornell Lab of Ornithology's Macaulay Library had 10 with no overlap between them. The species sings during an undulating circular flight display, with the song described as "loudly whispering chew wit" followed by a "sharp mechanical snap". Perched birds give a similar chew wit and also "a sharp pew note".

== Status ==
The IUCN has assessed the brujo flycatcher as Near Threatened. It has a limited range. Its "best estimate" population is 52,000 mature individuals with a possible range of 36,000 to 72,000. It is possibly extirpated from Floreana and Santa Fe islands. The species is "in serious decline" on Santa Cruz. "[T]hreats include competition from non-native birds like the smooth-billed ani [Crotophaga ani], and parasitisation from the larvae of the introduced parasitic fly, Philornis downsi. The Galapagos Conservation Trust "is currently supporting partners in their efforts to restore Floreana island to its former ecological glory, with the long-term goal of reintroducing locally extinct species such as the little vermilion flycatcher." In May 2023 conservation experts reported that 12 new chicks had been born that year on Santa Cruz. There were only 15 breeding pairs. The reserve's director Danny Rueda said that each chick that is born was a "new hope to save this species", adding "These 12 new birds constitute a veritable success since initiating the program in 2018 and finally getting results".
