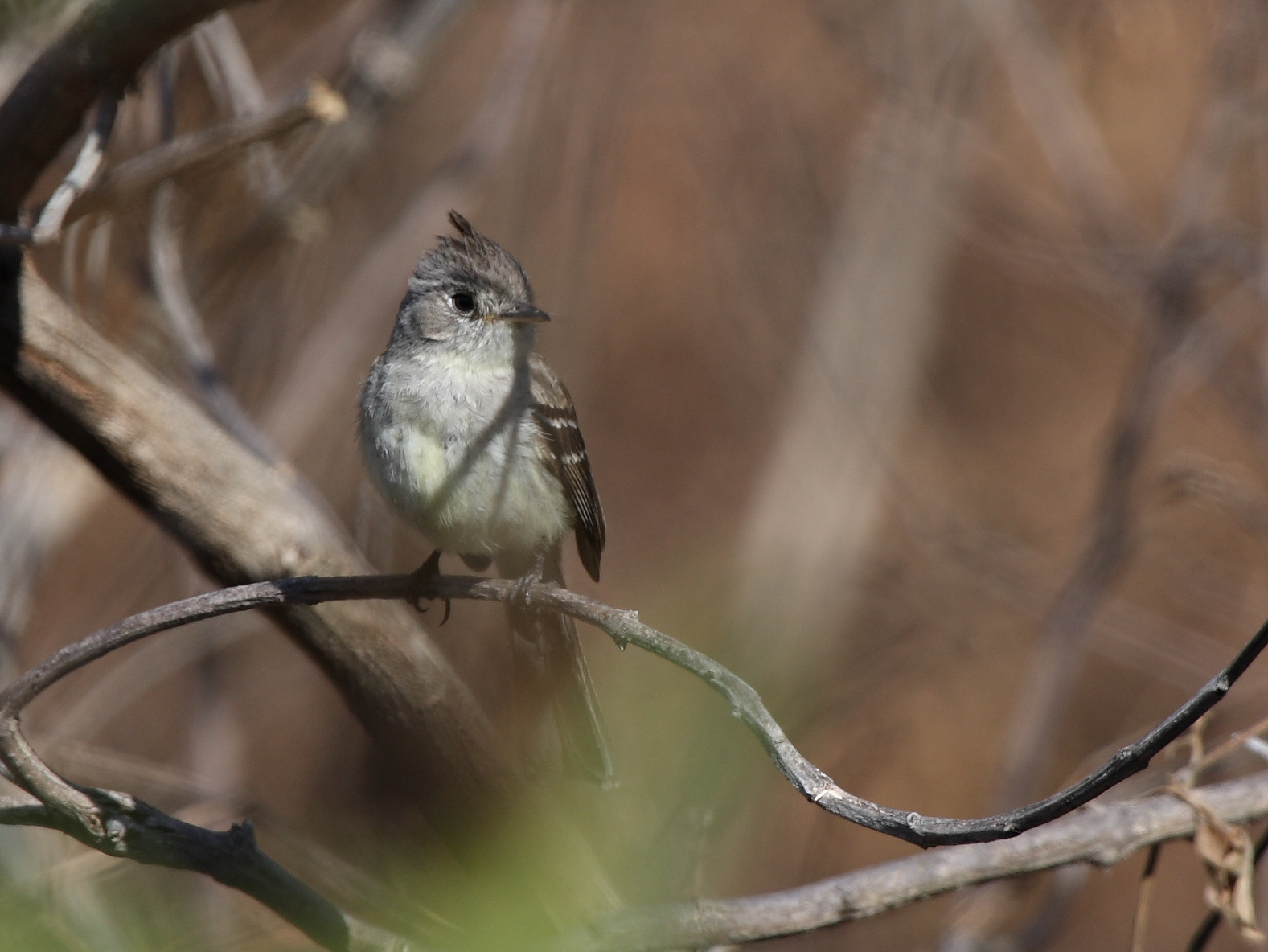
- Pileated flycatcher (Xenotriccus mexicanus)

Scientific classification
- Kingdom: Animalia
- Phylum: Chordata
- Class: Aves
- Order: Passeriformes
- Family: Tyrannidae
- Genus: Xenotriccus; Dwight & Griscom, 1927

Type species
- Xenotriccus callizonus Dwight & Griscom, 1927

Species
- see text

= Xenotriccus =

Genus of birds

Xenotriccus is a genus of bird in the family Tyrannidae.

== Species ==
It contains the following species:

Image	Common name	Scientific name	Distribution
	Belted flycatcher	Xenotriccus callizonus	southern Mexico, Guatemala and El Salvador.
	Pileated flycatcher	Xenotriccus mexicanus	western Mexico.
