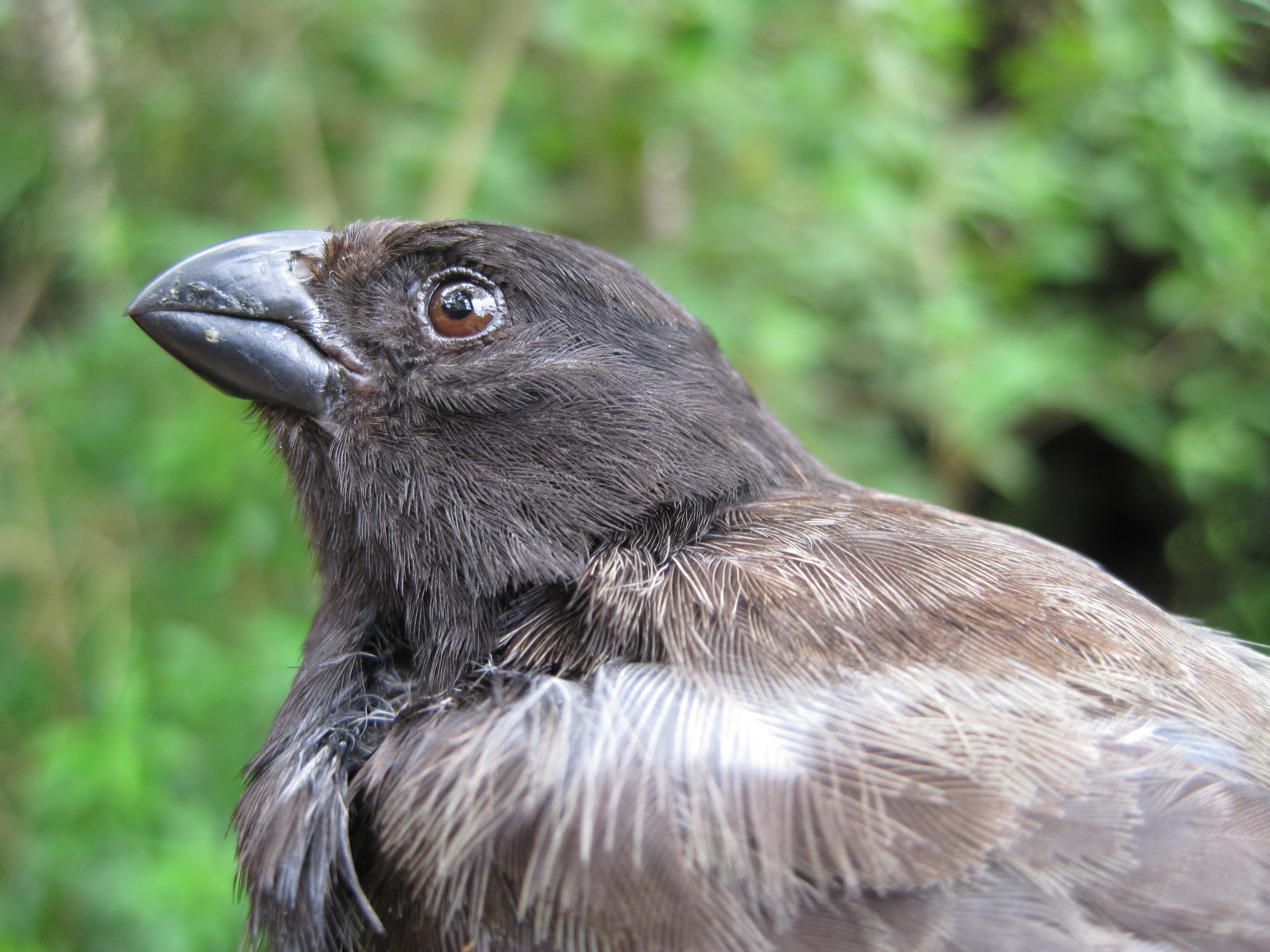
- male

Conservation status
- Critically Endangered (IUCN 3.1)

Scientific classification
- Kingdom: Animalia
- Phylum: Chordata
- Class: Aves
- Order: Passeriformes
- Family: Thraupidae
- Genus: Camarhynchus
- Species: C. pauper

Binomial name
- Camarhynchus pauper Ridgway, 1890

Synonyms
- Geospiza pauper

= Medium tree finch =

Species of bird

The medium tree finch (Camarhynchus pauper) is a species of Darwin's finch. It is endemic to the Galápagos Islands, where it occurs only on Floreana Island. Its name derives from its intermediate size between the small tree finch and large tree finch. Due to its limited geographic range and its high breeding mortality following the introduction of the parasitic avian vampire fly, the medium tree finch is listed as critically endangered on the IUCN Red List.

== Distribution ==
This species is only found on Floreana Island at elevations above 250 meters (820 ft) in moist highland forest habitats, across an range of about 24 km². Prime breeding habitat is dominated by Scalesia pedunculata trees, although the species also occurs in the surrounding agricultural zones. A 2008 survey estimated the number of medium tree finches as 1,620, while a series of surveys between 2014 and 2016 put the number of medium tree finch territories at between 3900 and 4700.

== Ecology ==
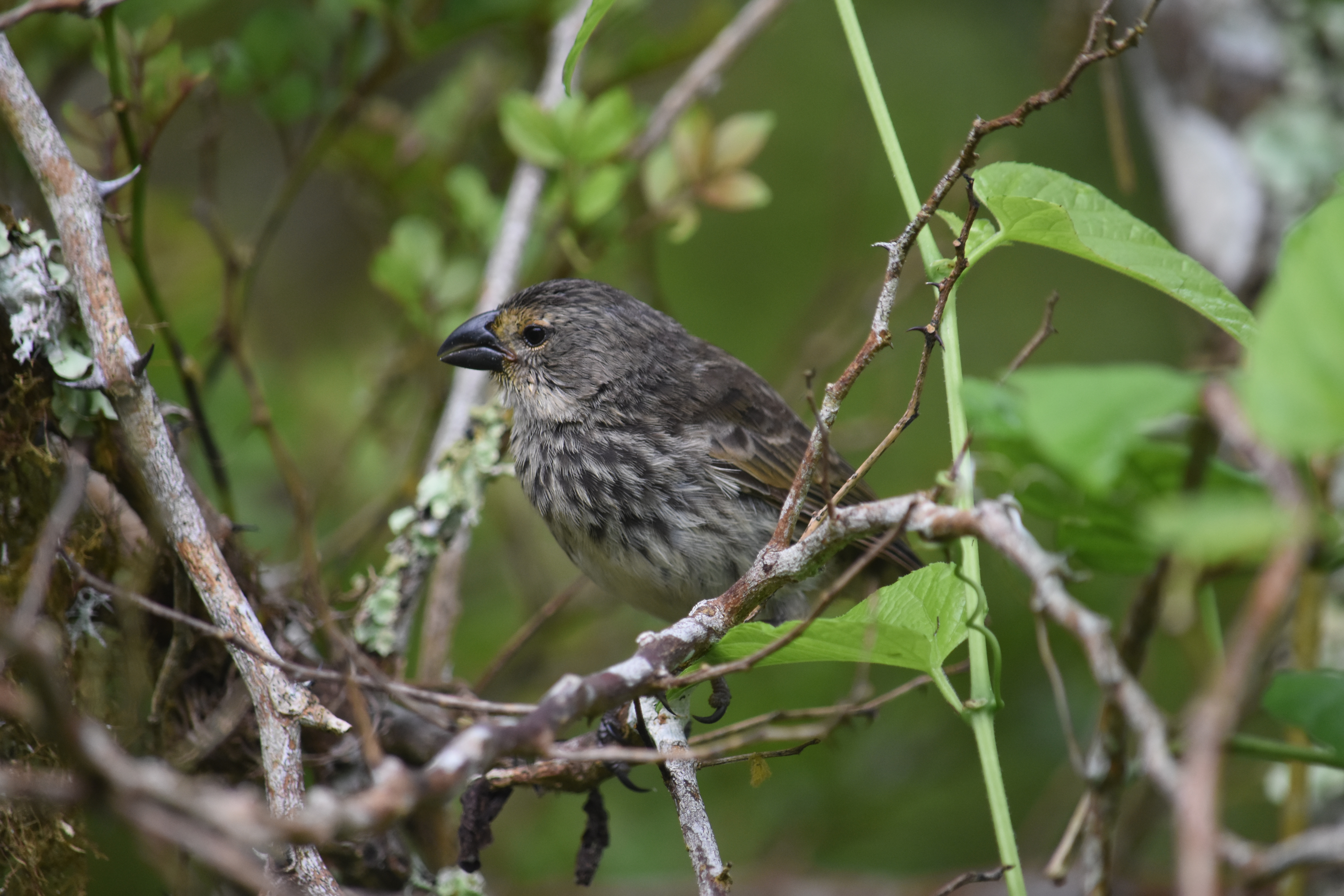
Young male medium tree finch on Floreana Island

The diurnal Galapagos short-eared owl is its only remaining natural predator. Medium tree finches generally lay two to three eggs. Eggs are incubated for approximately 12 days, and nestlings are fed by both parents at the nest for approximately 14 days before becoming fledglings. The beak of the medium tree finch is intermediate in size between the small tree finch and large tree finch.

== Status ==
The medium tree finch is threatened by introduced predators such as rats, mice, cats, and the smooth-billed ani, as well as habitat loss, which has occurred through clearance for agriculture.

The introduced avian vampire fly (Philornis downsi) is a significant threat to the survival of this species. The fly's parasitic larvae reside inside the nest material and feed on the blood and body tissues of nestlings. This parasitism causes high nestling mortality in the medium tree finch. Because of this, and because it has a very small range on a single island, the medium tree finch is listed as critically endangered on the IUCN Red List.
