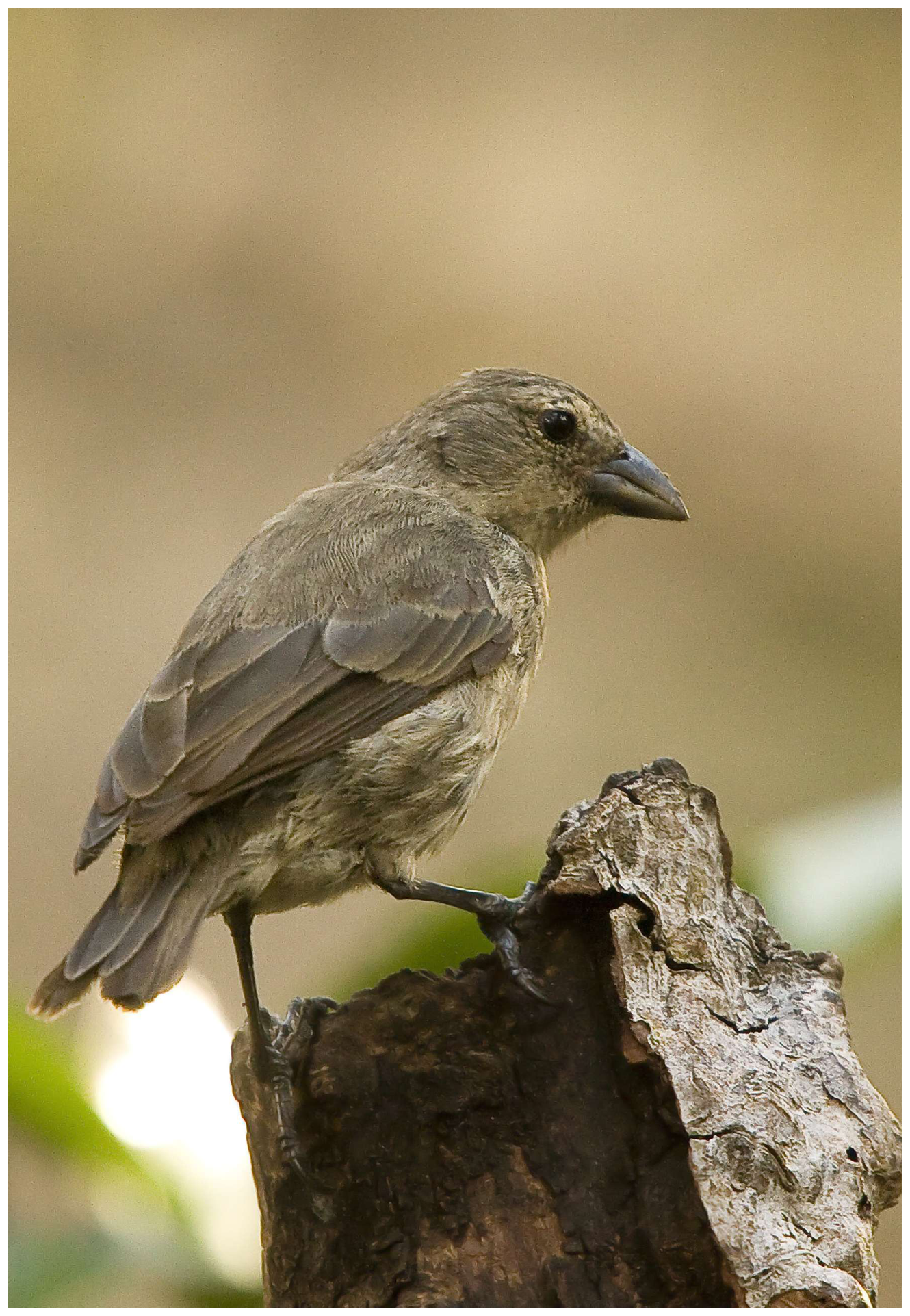

Conservation status
- Critically Endangered (IUCN 3.1)

Scientific classification
- Kingdom: Animalia
- Phylum: Chordata
- Class: Aves
- Order: Passeriformes
- Family: Thraupidae
- Genus: Camarhynchus
- Species: C. heliobates

Binomial name
- Camarhynchus heliobates (Snodgrass & Heller, 1901)

Synonyms
- Geospiza heliobates

= Mangrove finch =

Species of bird

The mangrove finch (Camarhynchus heliobates) is a species of bird in the Darwin's finch group of the tanager family Thraupidae. It is endemic to the Galápagos Islands. It was found on the islands of Fernandina and Isabela, but recent surveys have failed to record the species on Fernandina. It has been classified as critically endangered by BirdLife International, with an estimated population of 20–40 mature individuals in 2021, located in two large mangroves on Isabela. A study has shown that the two small populations remaining on Isabela Island have begun undergoing speciation and that one or both populations will eventually become extinct due to a lack of interbreeding.

== Habitat ==
As its name suggests, the mangrove finch lives in the mangroves of the Galápagos Islands. The mangrove finch feeds upon the various insects, larvae, spiders, and vegetable matter found in the mangroves. It closely resembles the far commoner woodpecker finch, but is not known to use tools.

== Predators ==
The main predators of the mangrove finch are cats, fire ants, paper wasps, and especially destructive black rats and parasitic flies. The black rats (Rattus rattus) are predators that account for 54% mortality rate of the mangrove finch during egg incubation, while the larvae of the avian vampire fly (Philornis downsi) add an additional 14% mortality rate of newly hatched chicks. Due to high predation rates in 2007 and 2008, rat poison was spread throughout different mangrove sites where the finches lived, which decreased rat predation to 30% mortality of the finch eggs. A year before the rat poison was dispersed, predation was observed in 70% of nests and the average success of nesting was 18%. By 2013, the avian vampire fly (introduced to the Galapagos Islands circa 1960s) had spread and killed about 55% of Darwin's finch nestlings within nests.

== Conservation ==
The mangrove finch is classified as critically endangered on the IUCN Red List, with only 20–40 mature individuals as of 2021.

In January 2014, project researchers reported successfully raising 15 mangrove finch chicks in captivity and releasing them back into the wild. Since then, 36 fledglings have been "head-started" and the project is building on this success.

The Mangrove Finch Project is a bi-institutional project carried out by the Charles Darwin Foundation and Galapagos National Park in collaboration with San Diego Zoo Global and Durrell Wildlife Conservation Trust. The project is supported by the Galapagos Conservation Trust, the Mohamed bin Zayed Species Conservation Fund, Durrell Wildlife Conservation Trust, The Leona M. and Harry B. Helmsley Charitable Trust, Galapagos Conservancy, and the British Embassy in Ecuador.

== Threats ==
=== Predators and parasites ===
The presence of invasive species, particularly the black rat, poses a significant threat to the mangrove finch. High rat abundance at breeding sites has led to substantial nesting failure due to predation and low fledgling success. Additional introduced predators, such as feral cats, smooth-billed ani, and fire ants, have also been identified as potential threats. The blood-sucking nest parasite Philornis downsi represents a significant and ongoing threat to the mangrove finch. It is present in all nests, with a high infestation rate, leading to substantial chick mortality. The impact of this parasite has become more prominent as invasive rodents have been controlled.

=== Disease ===
The potential arrival of avian pox poses another significant threat to the species, as the mangrove finch lacks exposure and resilience to this disease. The small population size makes the species inherently vulnerable to inbreeding, loss of genetic diversity, and hybridization with other species.

=== Habitat ===
Observations of widespread dieback in black mangrove trees in 2019 have raised concerns. While the mangrove finch can survive without these trees, they are the preferred nest sites. Changes in rainfall patterns negatively impact the population, resulting in fewer females attaining breeding condition. The species faces additional pressure from potential sea level rise driven by climate change.
