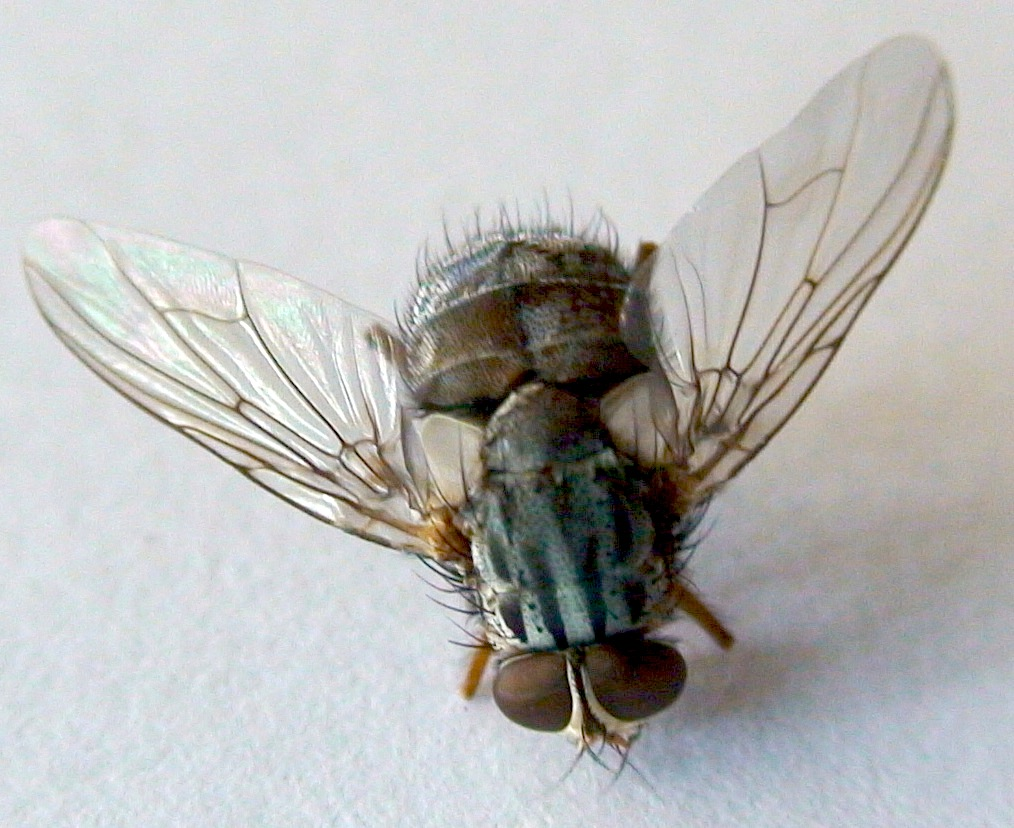
- Philornis downsi

Scientific classification
- Kingdom: Animalia
- Phylum: Arthropoda
- Clade: Pancrustacea
- Class: Insecta
- Order: Diptera
- Family: Muscidae
- Subfamily: Azeliinae
- Tribe: Reinwardtiini
- Genus: Philornis; Meinert, 1890

Synonyms
- Mesembrinellopsis Townsend, 1927; Neomusca Malloch, 1921

= Philornis =

Genus of flies

Philornis is a genus of around 50 species of fly (Diptera, Muscidae) from Central and South America. Their larvae are subcutaneous parasites of nestling birds. They are sometimes referred to as "bot flies", though they are not related to true bot flies (family Oestridae).

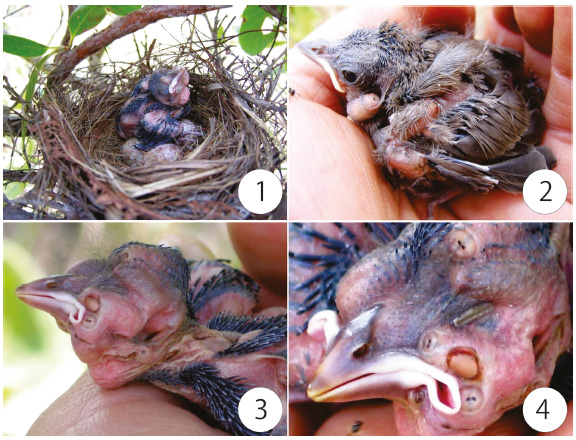
Nest of Neothraupis fasciata with parasitized nestlings by P. torquans

Two species are also found in the southern United States. One species, P. downsi, has been accidentally introduced to the Galapagos Archipelago, posing a major threat to some of its endemic birds.

They parasitize a wide range of bird species including psittacines. A study in the Peruvian Amazon compared parasite prevalence among different nests of scarlet macaws at the Tambopata research site, to see whether any of the nest types resulted in higher infestation. Parasite prevalence was significantly lower in natural nest hollows than in artificial nest boxes. The most extreme intensity was 63 larvae per chick, which is higher than those found for other Neotropical parrots. The study also described a new and efficient technique to remove larvae using a reverse syringe design snake bite extractor.

== Species ==
- Philornis aitkeni Dodge, 1963
- Philornis albuquerquei Couri, 1983
- Philornis amazonensis Couri, 1983
- Philornis angustifrons (Loew, 1861)
- Philornis bella Couri, 1984
- Philornis blanchardi García, 1952
- Philornis carinata Dodge, 1968
- Philornis cinnamomina (Stein, 1918)
- Philornis deceptiva (Dodge & Aitken, 1968)
- Philornis diminuta Couri, 1984
- Philornis downsi (Dodge & Aitken, 1968)
- Philornis falsifica (Dodge & Aitken, 1968)
- Philornis fasciventris (Wulp, 1896)
- Philornis frontalis Couri, 1984
- Philornis fumicosta Dodge, 1968
- Philornis gagnei Couri, 1983
- Philornis glaucinis Dodge & Aitken, 1968
- Philornis grandis Couri, 1984
- Philornis insularis Couri, 1983
- Philornis isla Couri, 2000
- Philornis lopesi Couri, 1983
- Philornis masoni Couri, 1986
- Philornis mediana Couri, 1984
- Philornis mima (Townsend, 1927)
- Philornis mimicola Dodge, 1968
- Philornis molesta Meinert, 1890)
- Philornis nielseni Dodge, 1968
- Philornis nigra Dodge & Aitken, 1968
- Philornis obscura (Wulp, 1896)
- Philornis obscurinervis Couri, 1984
- Philornis petersoni Couri, 1984
- Philornis porteri Dodge, 1955
- Philornis querula Dodge & Aitken, 1968
- Philornis rettenmeyeri Dodge, 1963
- Philornis ruforscutellaris Couri, 1983
- Philornis sabroskyi Albuquerque, 1957
- Philornis sanguinis Dodge & Aitken, 1968
- Philornis schildi Dodge, 1963
- Philornis seguyi García, 1952
- Philornis setinervis Dodge, 1963
- Philornis sperophila (Townsend, 1895)
- Philornis torquans (Nielsen, 1913)
- Philornis trinitensis Dodge & Aitken, 1968
- Philornis umanani García, 1952
- Philornis univittata Dodge, 1968
- Philornis vespidicola Dodge, 1968
- Philornis vulgaris Couri, 1984
- Philornis zeteki Dodge, 1963
