= Small tree finch =

Conservation status
- Least Concern (IUCN 3.1)

Scientific classification
- Kingdom: Animalia
- Phylum: Chordata
- Class: Aves
- Order: Passeriformes
- Family: Thraupidae
- Genus: Camarhynchus
- Species: C. parvulus

Binomial name
- Camarhynchus parvulus (Gould, 1837)

Synonyms
- Geospiza parvula

Species of bird

The small tree finch (Camarhynchus parvulus) is a bird species belonging to the Darwin's finch group within the tanager family Thraupidae. It has a grasping beak with curved culmens. Its natural habitats are subtropical or tropical dry forests and subtropical or tropical dry shrubland. During the non-breeding season it is known to form large groups with small ground-finches.

It is an endemic species to the Galapagos islands and its conservation status has been listed as "Least Concern". However, bird counts which have been conducted since 1997 have shown a continuous decline in small tree-finch populations in the Scalesia and agricultural zones of Santa Cruz, where the small tree-finch is most abundant. Small tree-finch counts have remained stable in the transition zone (also quite abundant here) and in the less popular dry and fern zones on Santa Cruz island. This species is in particularly impacted by the larvae of the parasitic avian vampire fly (Philornis downsi).

== Distribution ==
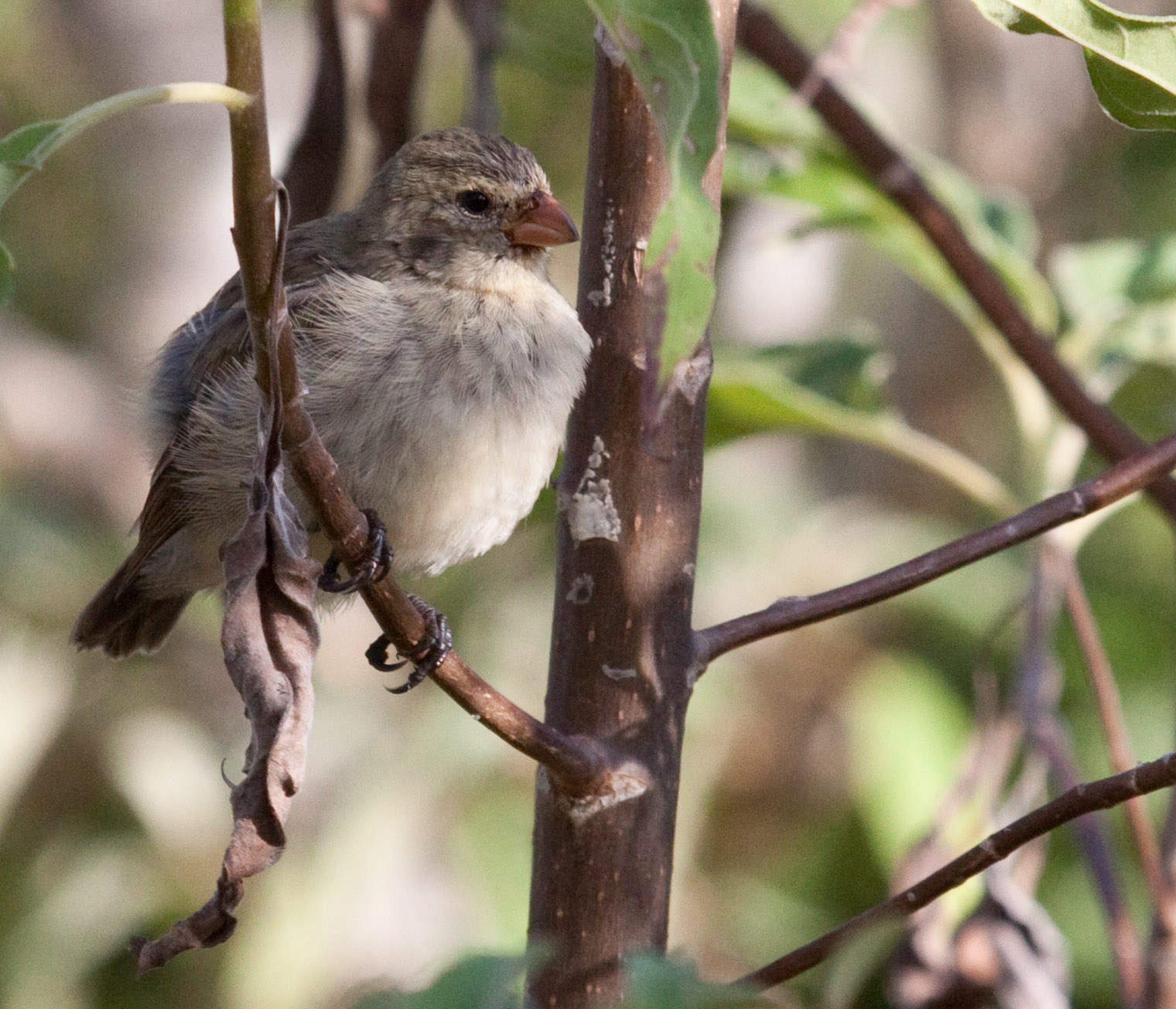
A female bird

The small tree finch is found on all the main islands except Española, Genovesa, Marchena, Darwin, and Wolf. It was also absent in the most recent census (2017–2018) on Rábida, Pinta, and Santa Fé islands.

== Mating ==
Darwin's tree finches build display domed nests and use these to attract mates and for nesting. Male small tree finches will sing close to their nest once it has been built, to attract female small tree finches. When these arrive, they inspect the display nest by entering it. Thereafter they will either choose to accept both the male and the display nest, accept the male but reject the nest (so they will then build a new nest together), or reject both the male and the display nest.

Older males build more concealed nests, typically higher within the tree canopy, compared to younger males, which reduces predation on the nests. Females preferentially choose to breed with older males with whom they have higher fledging success compared to younger males. In a study by Kleindorfer (2007), predation accounted for 60% of nest loss, making it a strong selective force. Males with high vocal performance, which is predicted by beak morphology, also have higher pairing success. There is also evidence for size-assortative pairing based on beak and tarsus length. Thus multiple factors influence pairing success in small tree finches: male and female body and beak size, male vocal performance, nest concealment, and male age.

== Colouration ==
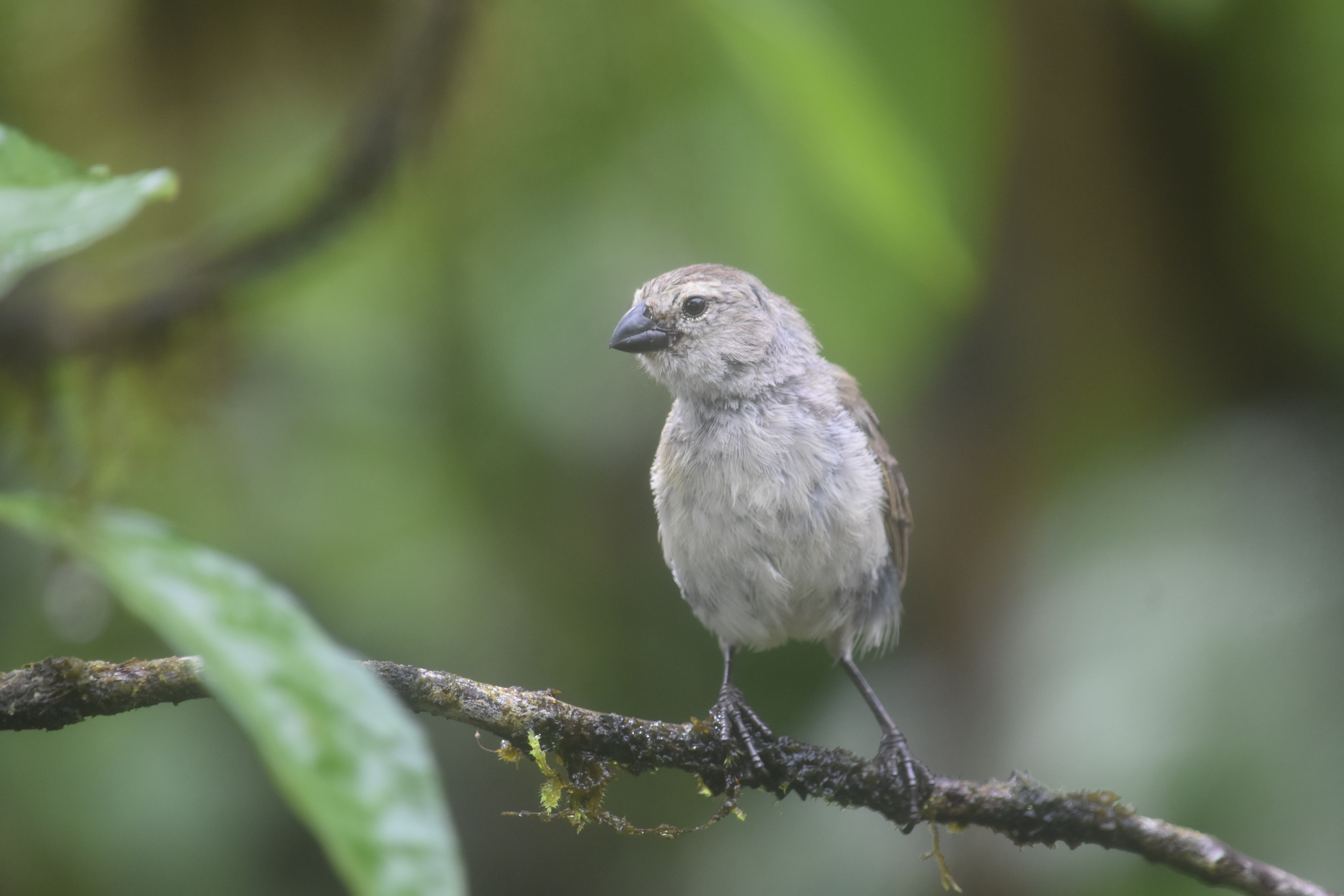
Young male small tree finch on Santa Cruz Island

Small tree finches moult annually. Female small tree finches are grey/brown throughout their lives. Male ground finches are born grey/brown, similar to females, but through a pattern of annual moult, attain a black crown and chin (the upper part of their body). Age difference can be assessed in males by observing the darkness of their crown and chin.

== Feeding ==
The small tree-finch is a mainly insectivorous bird, although has a varied diet. Typically, it gleans arthropods and leaves from bark surfaces, but 42% of its diet consists of vegetable matter (nectar, fruits, and seeds).
