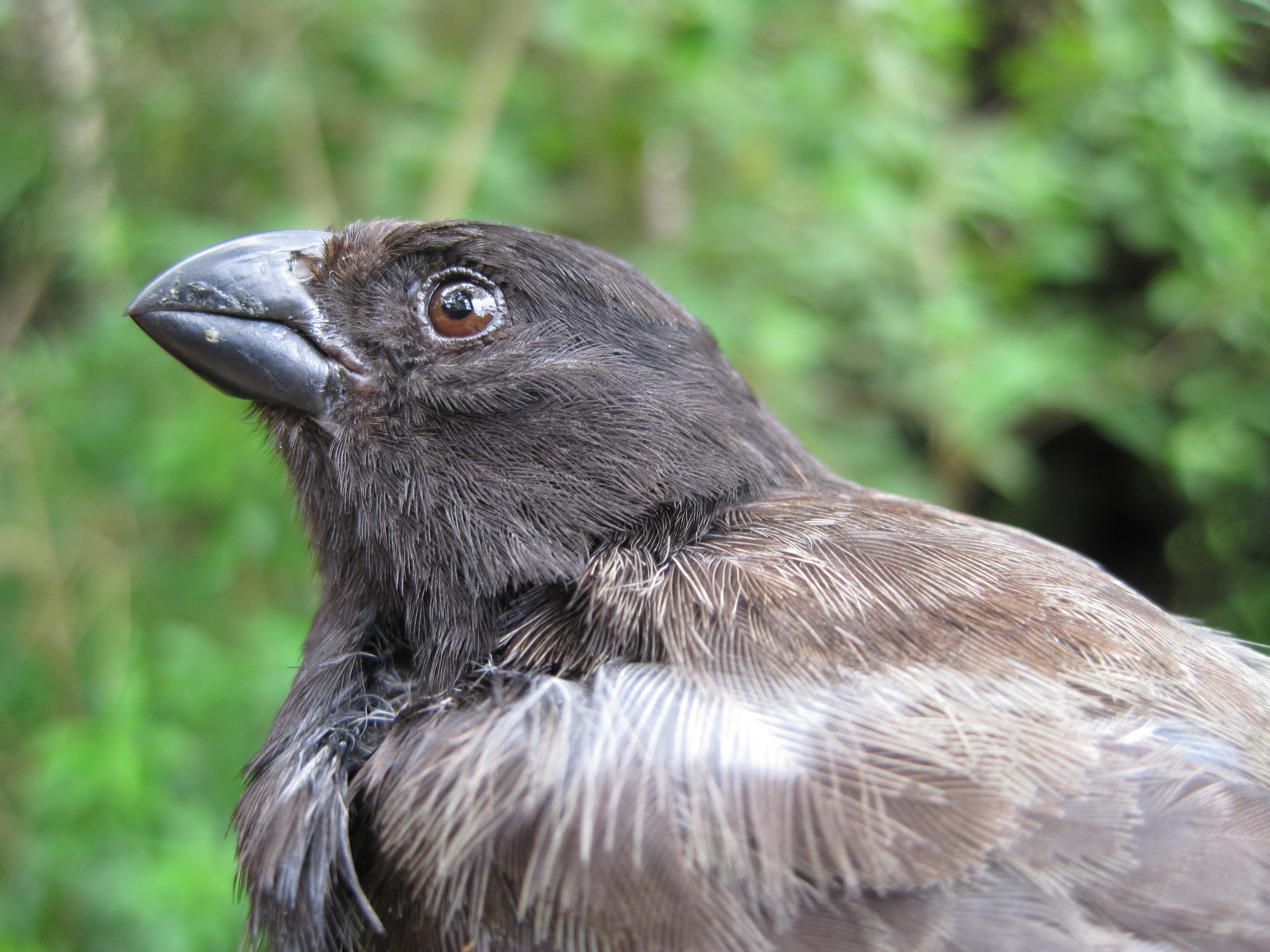
- Medium tree finch (Camarhynchus pauper)

Scientific classification
- Kingdom: Animalia
- Phylum: Chordata
- Class: Aves
- Order: Passeriformes
- Family: Thraupidae
- Genus: Camarhynchus; Gould, 1837

Type species
- Camarhynchus psittacula Gould, 1837

= Camarhynchus =

Genus of birds

Camarhynchus is a genus of birds in the tanager family Thraupidae. All species of Camarhynchus are endemic to the Galápagos Islands, and together with related genera, they are collectively known as Darwin's finches. Formerly classified in the bunting and American sparrow family Emberizidae, more recent molecular genetic studies have shown it to belong in the tanager family.

== Taxonomy and species list ==
The genus Camarhynchus was introduced in 1837 by English ornithologist John Gould, with the large tree finch as the type species. The name combines the Ancient Greek kamara meaning "arch" or "vault" with rhunkhos meaning "bill". The members of the genus form part of a group collectively known as Darwin's finches. Although traditionally placed with the buntings and New World sparrows in the family Emberizidae, molecular phylogenetic studies have shown that Darwin's finches are members of the subfamily Coerebinae within the tanager family Thraupidae. The genus contains the following five species.

Image	Scientific name	Common name	Distribution
	Camarhynchus parvulus	Small tree finch	Galapagos Islands.
	Camarhynchus pauper	Medium tree finch	Galápagos Islands where it is only found on Floreana Island
	Camarhynchus psittacula	Large tree finch	Galapagos Islands
	Camarhynchus pallidus	Woodpecker finch	Galapagos Islands
	Camarhynchus heliobates	Mangrove finch	Galápagos Islands

The vegetarian finch (Platyspiza crassirostris) has sometimes been included in this genus.
