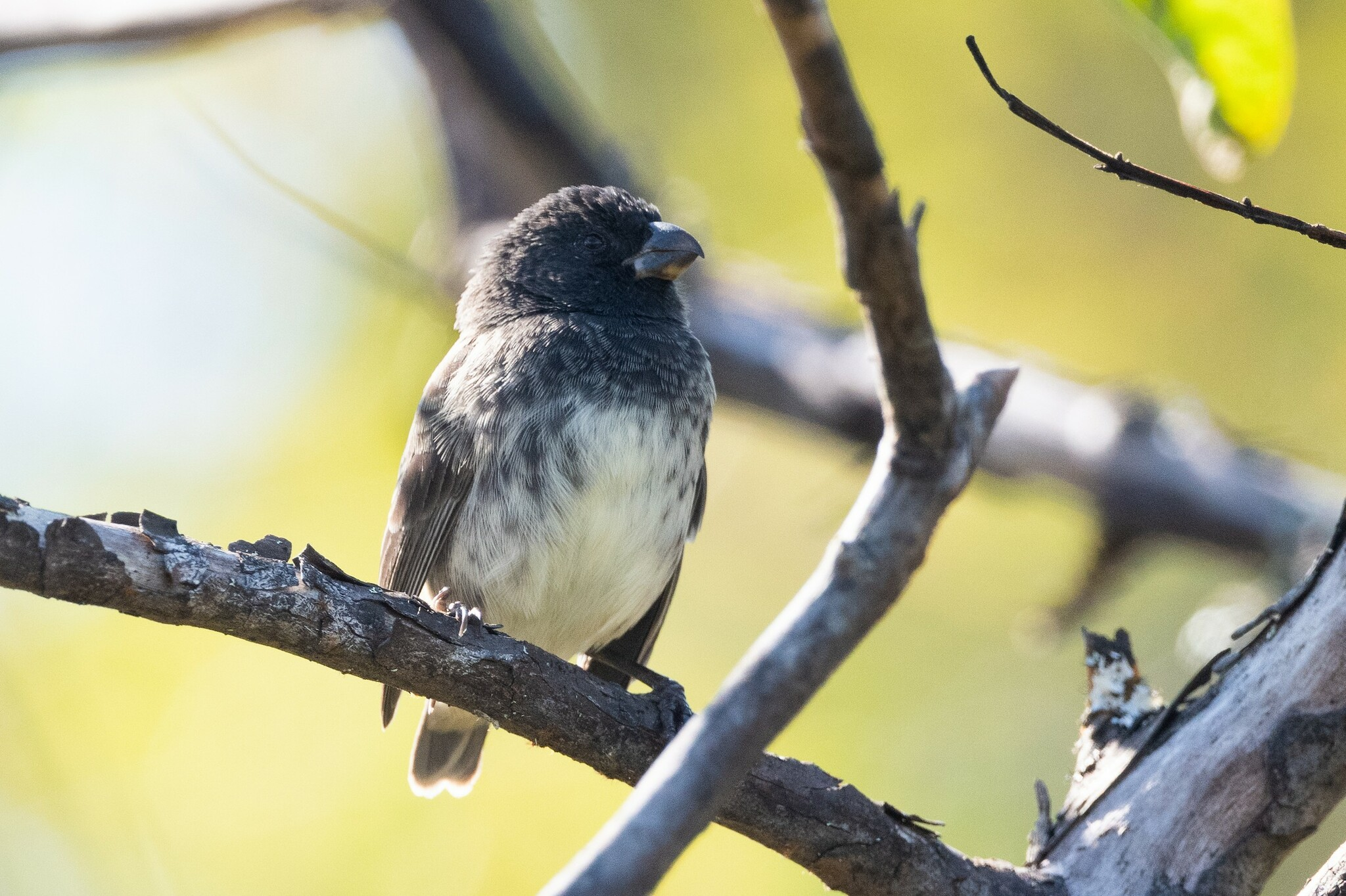

Conservation status
- Vulnerable (IUCN 3.1)

Scientific classification
- Kingdom: Animalia
- Phylum: Chordata
- Class: Aves
- Order: Passeriformes
- Family: Thraupidae
- Genus: Camarhynchus
- Species: C. psittacula

Binomial name
- Camarhynchus psittacula Gould, 1837

Synonyms
- Geospiza psittacula

= Large tree finch =

Species of bird

The large tree finch (Camarhynchus psittacula) is a species of bird in the Darwin's finch group of the tanager family Thraupidae. It is endemic to the Galapagos Islands.

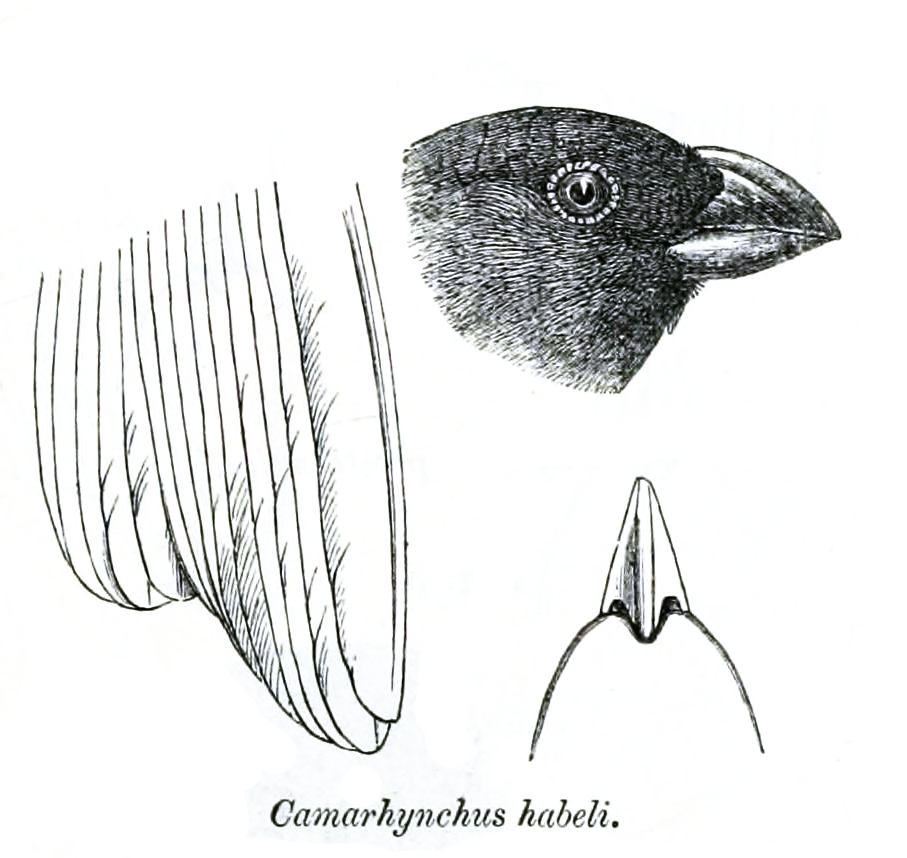

Its natural habitats are subtropical or tropical dry forests and subtropical or tropical moist montane forests.
