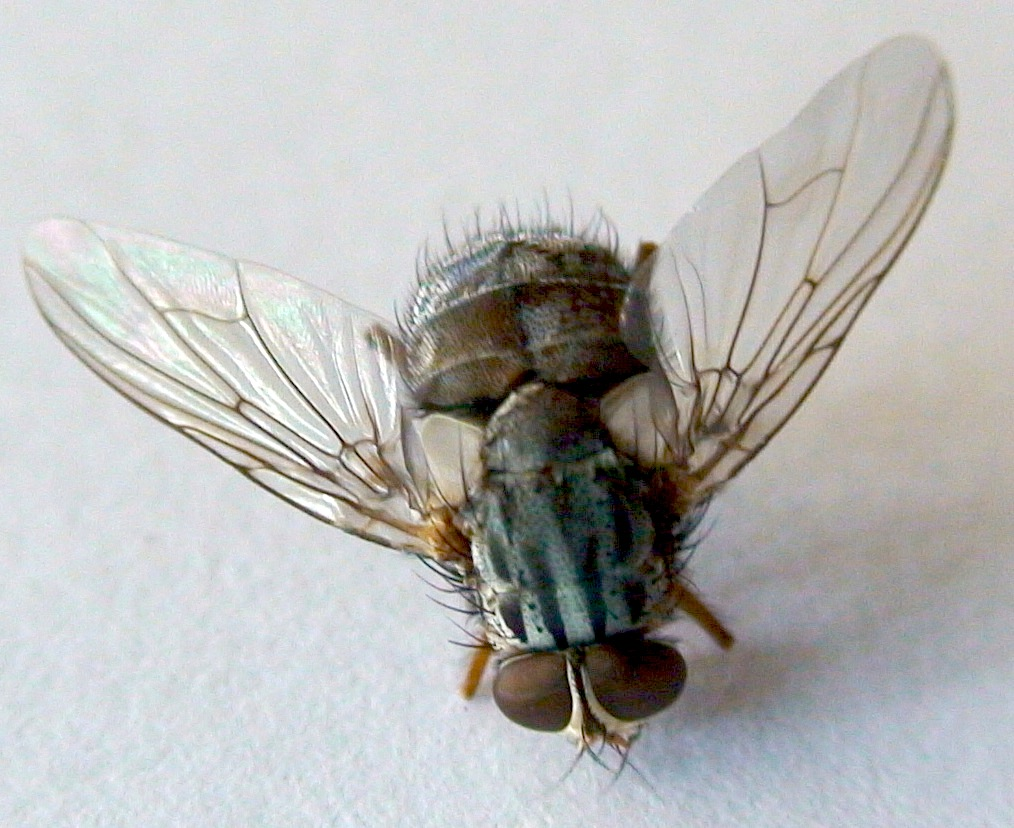

Scientific classification
- Kingdom: Animalia
- Phylum: Arthropoda
- Clade: Pancrustacea
- Class: Insecta
- Order: Diptera
- Family: Muscidae
- Genus: Philornis
- Species: P. downsi

Binomial name
- Philornis downsi Dodge & Aitken, 1968

Synonyms
- Neomusca downsi Dodge & Aitken, 1968

= Avian vampire fly =

Species of fly

The avian vampire fly (Philornis downsi) is a species of parasitic fly. Although adult avian vampire flies are vegetarian, their larvae survive by parasitising birds in the nest. The species was accidentally introduced to the Galápagos Islands, where it has become a major cause of breeding mortality in Darwin's finches.

== Taxonomy ==
The avian vampire fly is one of about 50 species in the genus Philornis, of which all but two are obligate parasites of nestling birds. It is the best studied in the genus, given the conservation threat it poses to Galápagos landbirds.

== Life cycle ==
The adult avian vampire fly is free-living and vegetarian, feeding on decaying vegetation. Female flies lay their eggs inside bird nests, with the larvae hatching three days later. These fly larvae are parasitic, feeding both internally and externally on the blood and flesh of developing nestlings, and sometimes on the incubating adult birds. First-instar larvae live inside the nares of nestlings, while second- and third-instar larvae remain inside the nest material and emerge at night to feed on nestlings. Avian vampire flies complete their larval stages within 4–7 days (Note: In laboratory conditions, this typically takes 9–10 days.) and spend another 9–10 days as pupae.

== Conservation concerns ==
Avian vampire fly larvae were first reported in Darwin's finch nests on Santa Cruz Island in 1997, although the species was present on the Galápagos Islands as early as the 1960s.

The fly's parasitic larvae cause significant mortality in Darwin's finch nestlings and threaten the survival of some rarer species such as the mangrove finch (Camarhynchus heliobates) and medium tree finch (C. pauper). Exposure to avian vampire fly parasitism enlarges the nares of nestlings. Even offspring that successfully fledge may suffer fitness consequences from early-life parasitism, as their damaged beaks are less able to produce high-quality species-specific songs.

To protect the threatened finch populations, insecticide-laced cotton has been supplied as nesting material for the finches, with the results being highly successful in combating P. downsi infestations at a localized scale. Currently, biological pest control agents, including Conura annulifera, are being investigated for their potential safety and efficacy in controlling P. downsi on the Galapagos Islands.

== Gallery ==
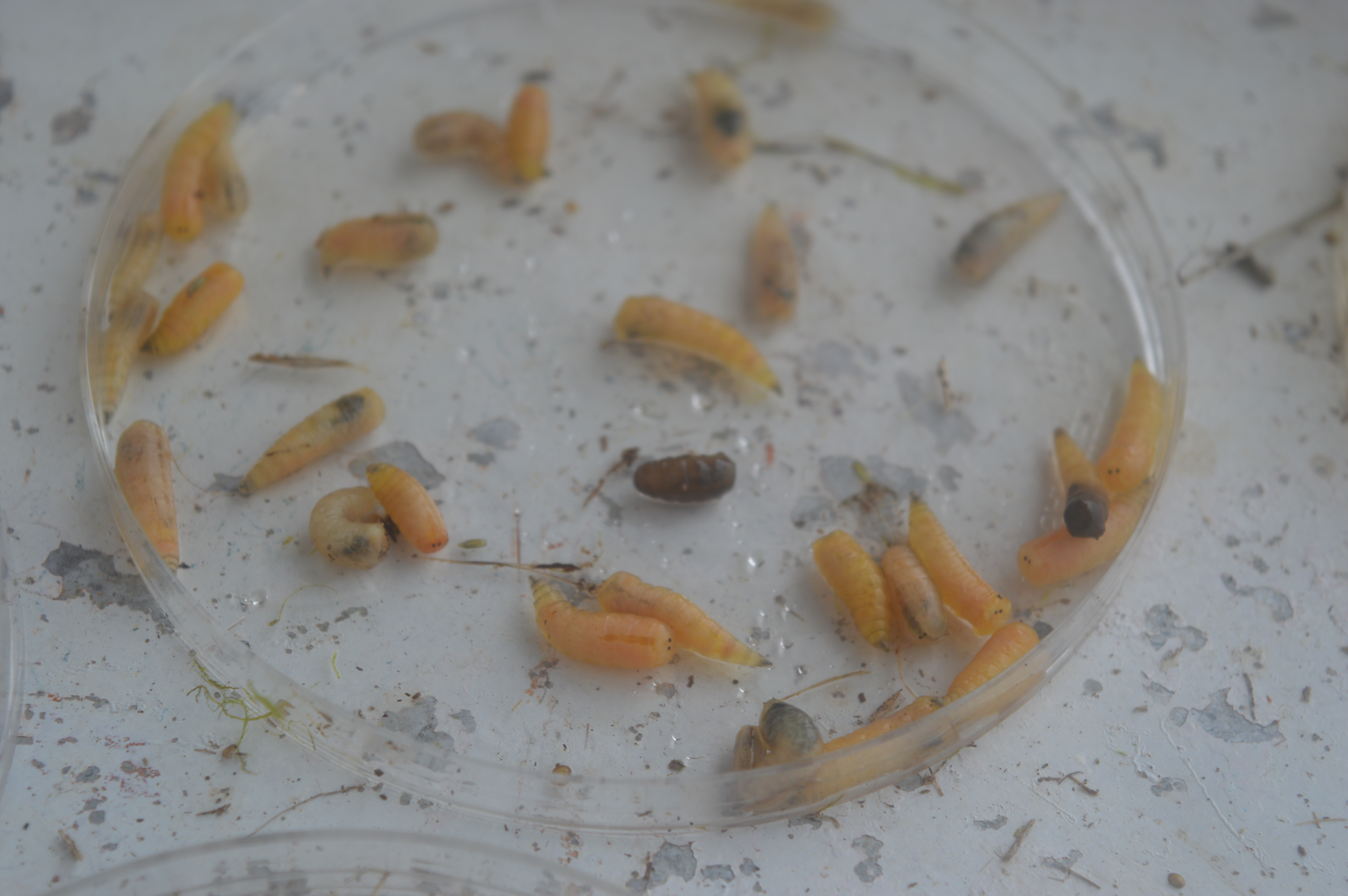
Avian vampire fly larvae collected from a Darwin's finch nest

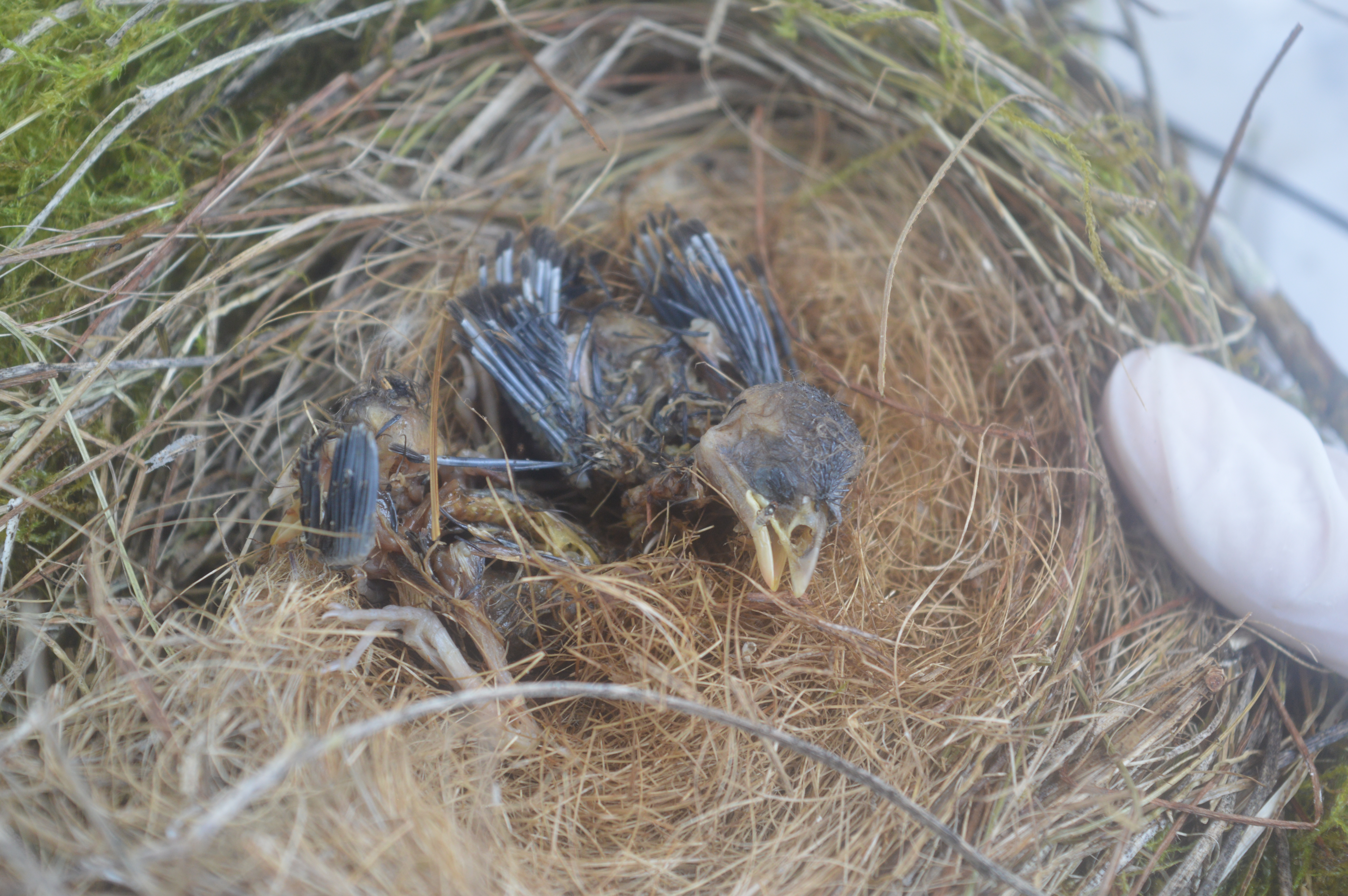
Dead Darwin's finch nestlings with enlarged nares caused by avian vampire fly parasitism
