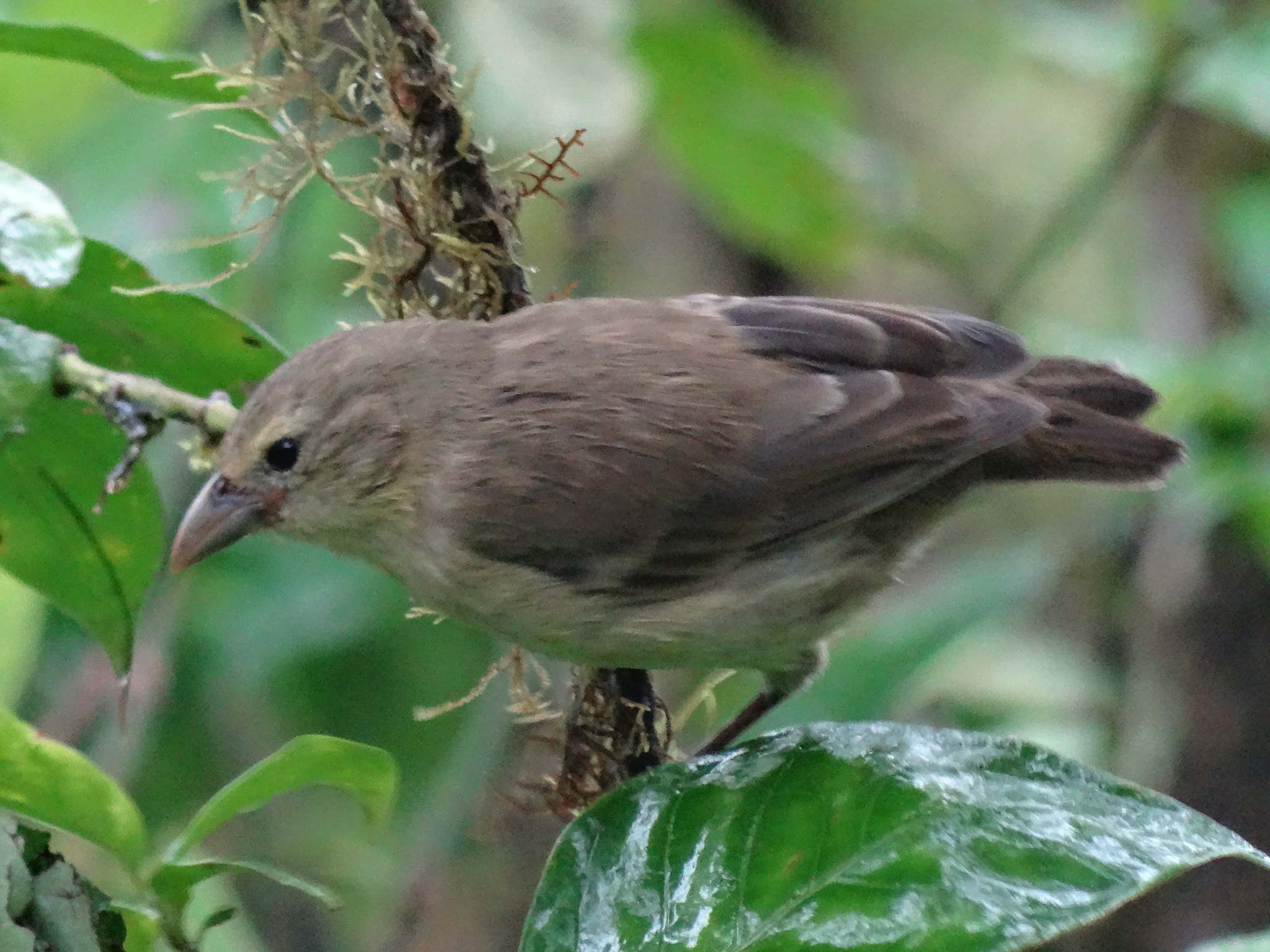

Conservation status
- Near Threatened (IUCN 3.1)

Scientific classification
- Kingdom: Animalia
- Phylum: Chordata
- Class: Aves
- Order: Passeriformes
- Family: Thraupidae
- Genus: Camarhynchus
- Species: C. pallidus

Binomial name
- Camarhynchus pallidus (Sclater, PL & Salvin, 1870)

Synonyms
- Geospiza pallida; Cactospiza pallida

= Woodpecker finch =

Species of bird

The woodpecker finch (Camarhynchus pallidus) is a monomorphic species of bird in the Darwin's finch group of the tanager family Thraupidae, endemic to the Galapagos Islands. The diet of a woodpecker finch revolves mostly around invertebrates, but also encompasses a variety of seeds. Woodpecker finches, like many other species of birds, form breeding pairs and care for young until they have fledged. The most distinctive characteristic of woodpecker finches is their ability to use tools for foraging. This behaviour indicates that they have highly specialized cognitive abilities. Woodpecker finches have also shown the ability to learn new behaviours regarding tool use via social learning. Not all populations of woodpecker finches use tools equally often, as this is influenced by the environment in which they live.

== Description ==
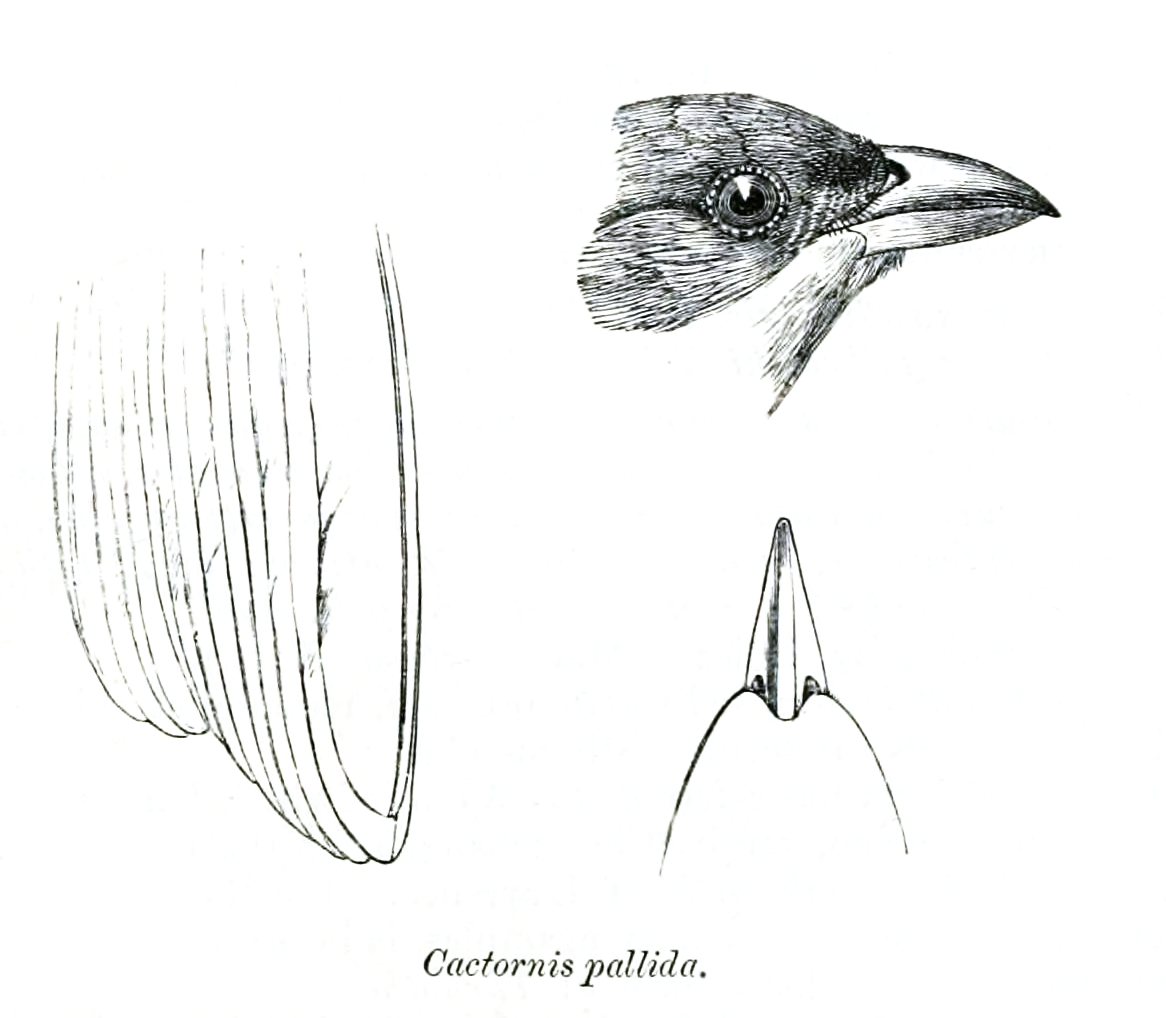
Illustration of a woodpecker finch

Woodpecker finches range in weight from 23 to 29 g (0.81 to 1.02 oz) and are about 15 cm (5.9 in) long. Although their tongues are quite short, they have a relatively long bill compared to other species of Darwin's finches.

== Distribution ==
Woodpecker finches are native to the Galapagos Islands. They are commonly found on the islands of Isabela, Santa Cruz, San Cristobal, Fernandina, Santiago, and Penzón. They occupy all areas of the islands, from the most arid zones to more humid zones. However, the density of woodpecker finches is greater in the more humid zones than in the drier ones. Woodpecker finches are also found at a variety of altitudes, from sea level to higher inland elevations. They are not a migratory species and when they do fly, they only fly short distances.

== Diet ==
Woodpecker finch diets mainly consist of arthropods found under dead logs and rocks. They also eat larvae, which are often located inside dead logs. Their habit of pecking at fallen logs is similar to a woodpecker's drumming on a tree trunk. Wood-boring beetle larvae are a staple of their diet. They also often feed on moths, caterpillars, and crickets. Another significant part of their diet includes meat from the small animals it kills, making woodpecker finches important hunters.

== Foraging behaviour ==
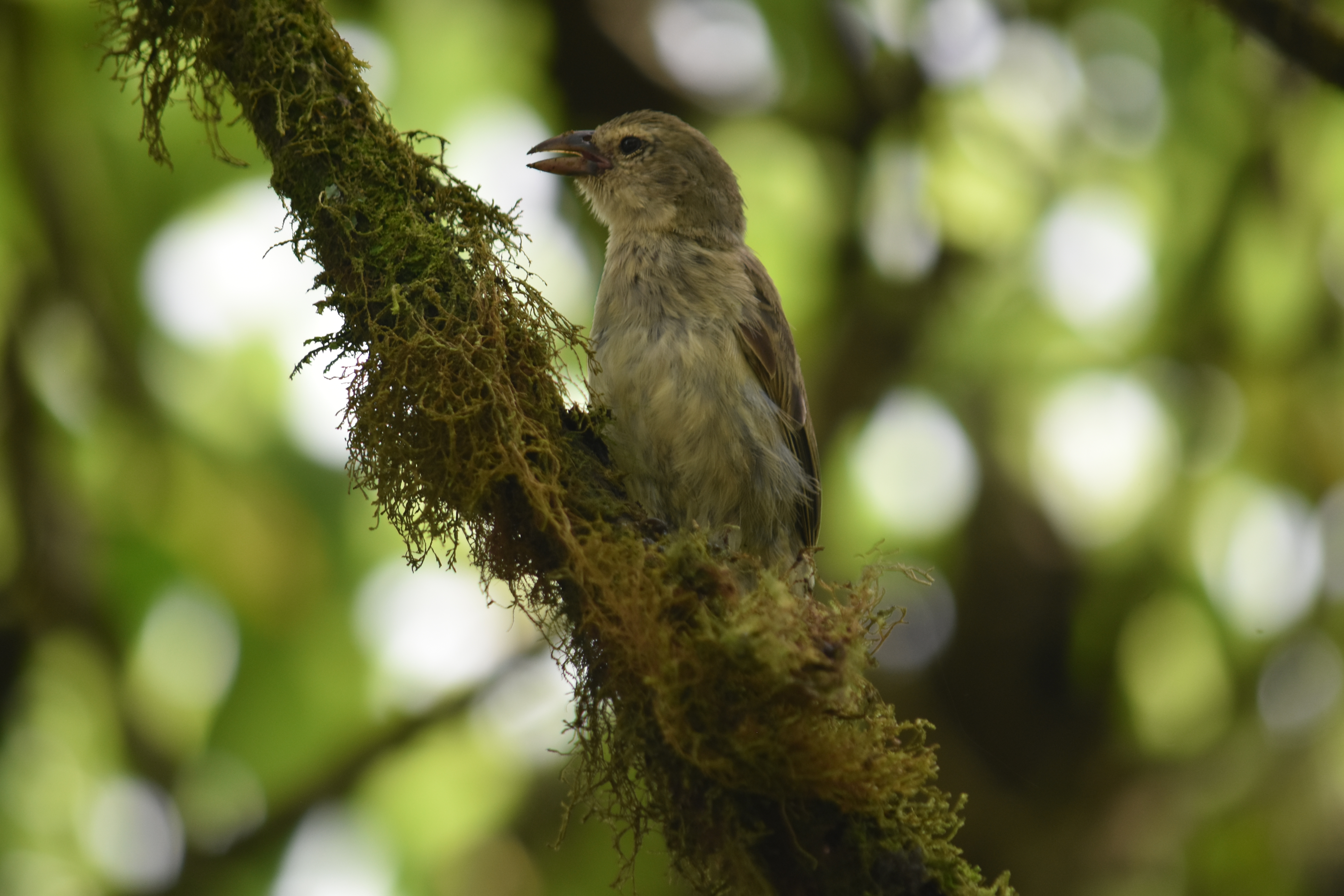
Male woodpecker finch on Santa Cruz Island

One of the most distinguishable traits of the woodpecker finch is its ability to use twigs, sticks, or cactus spines as tools. This behaviour has earned it the nicknames "tool-using finch" and "carpenter finch". The finch manipulates the tool to dislodge invertebrate prey, such as grubs, from crevices in trees. It has been hypothesized that, due to the absence of woodpeckers on the Galapagos islands, woodpecker finches filled a similar niche on the Galapagos Islands.

The ability to use tools is a highly specialized cognitive ability, as it involves the animal creating and recognizing a relationship between two foreign objects found in its environment. Woodpecker finches are capable of using a variety of materials to construct the tools they use. Scientists have observed finches shortening the length of sticks or cactus spines to make them more manageable for tool use. The same tool can be used multiple times and on different trees. Woodpecker finches may also try various sticks or spines at one site before finding one that can reach and extract the prey item. There is conflicting evidence about whether this behaviour is acquired through social learning. On the one hand, juveniles have been observed using tools without previous contact with adults. In contrast, juvenile woodpecker finches have also been observed learning to use novel tools made from non-native plant species, such as blackberry bushes. After observing adult woodpecker finches prep barbed twigs and use them to obtain prey from crevices in trees, juvenile finches displayed the same behaviour with the novel tool. These observations indicate that social learning may occur in wild woodpecker finch populations.

Woodpecker finch uses a stick tool to forage, on Santa Cruz Island

The frequency of tool use by woodpecker finches depends largely on whether they live in a more wet or dry environment. Woodpecker finches living in wetter environments seldom use tools, as prey is much more abundant, whereas those in dry areas commonly use tools during foraging. During the dry season, woodpecker finches use tools while foraging to acquire up to 50% of their prey. This tool use allows woodpecker finches to obtain prey that they would otherwise be unable to reach with their short tongues. It is thought that this behaviour evolved due to the dry and unstable environmental conditions on the Galapagos Islands.

== Reproduction ==
There are no morphological differences between either sex in woodpecker finches, as they are monomorphic. Woodpecker finches mainly use moss, lichens, and grass as building materials for their nests. During the 2-week incubation period when females are sitting on the eggs, males linger nearby, often feeding the females. Female woodpecker finches typically lay around 2–3 eggs. Both males and females participate in the feeding of the chicks from the day they hatch until well after they have become independent. Woodpecker finch chicks will fledge around 2 weeks after hatching.
