= Isabela Canton =

Isabela Canton Cantón Isabela
- Canton
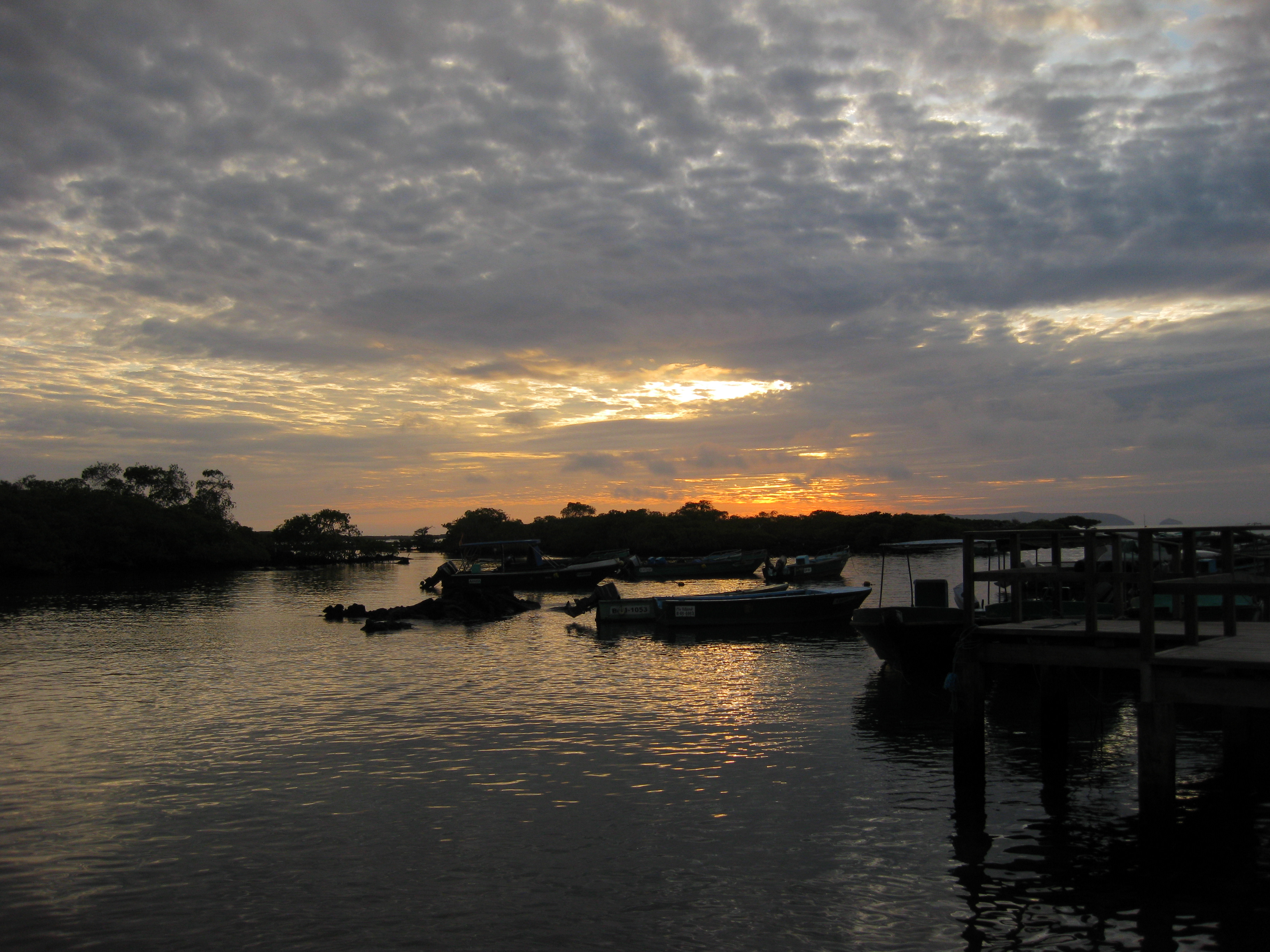
- Puerto Villamil

- Cantons of Galápagos Province
- Coordinates: 0.4724°S 90.6811°W
- Country: Ecuador
- Province: Galápagos Province
- Capital: Puerto Villamil

Area
  - Total: 5,367 km^{2} (2,072 sq mi)

Population (2010)
  - Total: 1,780
  - Density: 0.332/km^{2} (0.859/sq mi)

Isabela Canton is a canton of Galápagos Province, Ecuador, consisting of the islands of Isabela Island, Darwin, Fernandina, Wolf, and some minor islets. Isabela is the largest island in the Galápagos, and well known for its beaches, bays and coastal lagoons with a wide variety of plants and birds. The capital of the canton is Puerto Villamil.

Isabela's human population has increased over the years, mainly during the 1970s, but the canton remains the least populated in the province, and among the least populated in Ecuador. Today fishing is the principal economic activity, but ecotourism and the production of handcrafts are becoming increasingly important.

Six volcanoes are found on the island of Isabela, of which two are over 1,700 meters, Wolf and Cerro Azul. The sites most commonly visited by tourists are Punta Garcia, to see the flightless cormorants; Volcán Alcedo for Land Tortoises; Tagus Cove for blue-footed boobies, flightless cormorants, Galápagos penguins, and marine iguanas; and Urbina Bay for sea turtles.
