= Volcanoes of the Galápagos Islands =

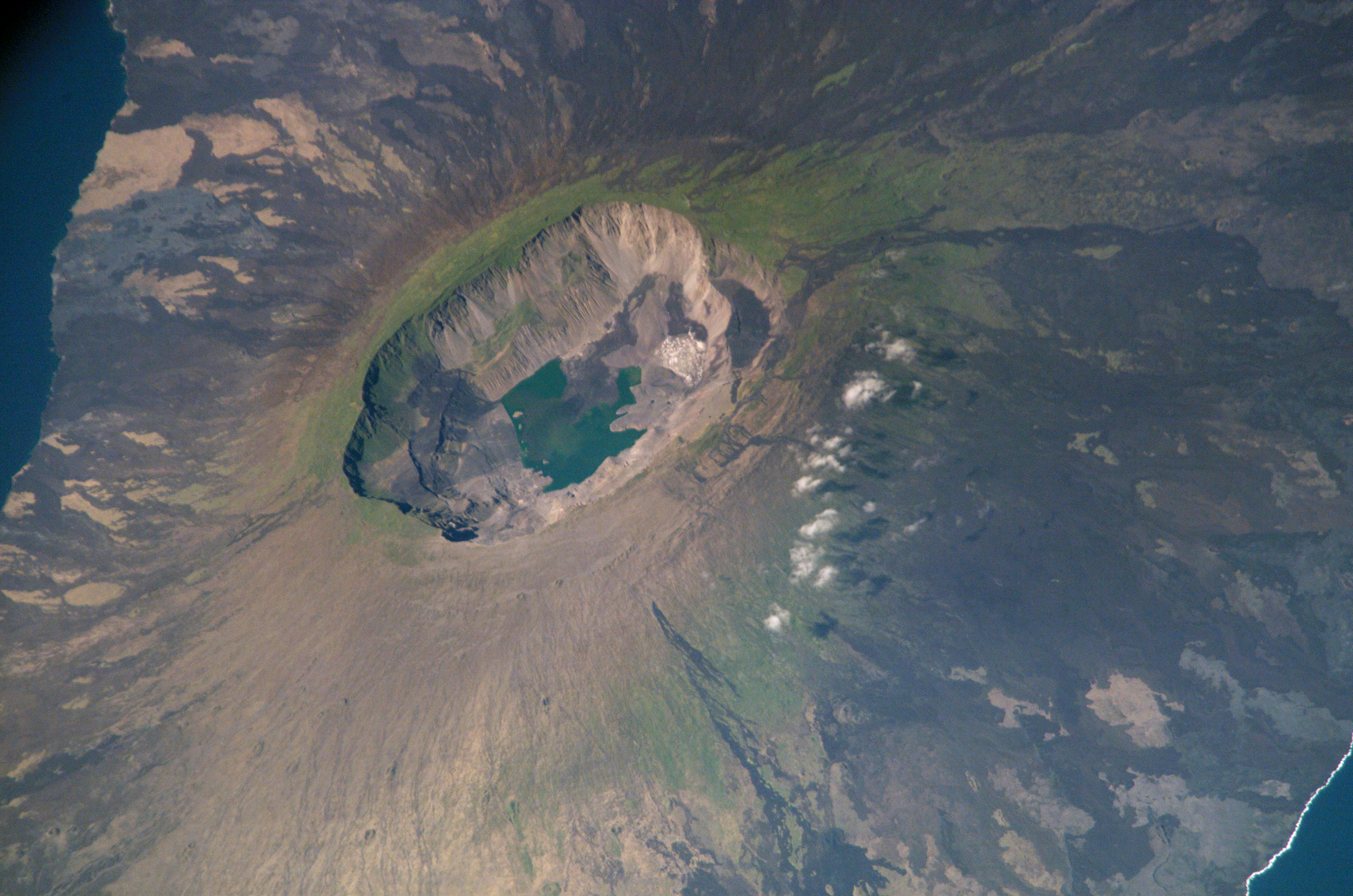
La Cumbre volcano, viewed from the ISS, July 2002

The Galápagos Islands are an isolated set of volcanoes, consisting of shield volcanoes and lava plateaus, located 1,200 km (746 mi) west of Ecuador. They are driven by the Galápagos hotspot, and are between 4.2 million and 700,000 years of age. The largest island, Isabela, consists of six coalesced shield volcanoes, each delineated by a large summit caldera. Española, the oldest island, and Fernandina, the youngest, are also shield volcanoes, as are most of the other islands in the chain. The Galápagos Islands are perched on a large lava plateau known as the Galápagos Platform, which creates a shallow-water depth of 360 to 900 m (1,181 to 2,953 ft) at the base of the islands, which stretch over a 174 mi (280 km)-long diameter. Since Charles Darwin's famous visit to the islands in 1835, over 60 recorded eruptions have occurred in the islands, from six different shield volcanoes. Of the 21 emergent volcanoes, 13 are considered active.

The Galápagos are geologically young for such a big chain, and the pattern of their rift zones follows one of two trends, one north-northwest, and one east–west. The composition of the lavas of the Galápagos shields are strikingly similar to those of the Hawaiian volcanoes. Curiously, they do not form the same volcanic "line" associated with most hotspots. They are not alone in this regard; the Cobb–Eickelberg Seamount chain in the North Pacific is another example of such a delineated chain. In addition, no clear pattern of age is seen between the volcanoes, suggesting a complicated, irregular pattern of creation.

List of Galápagos volcanoes
Name	Last eruption
La Cumbre	2024
Wolf	2022
Sierra Negra	2018
Cerro Azul	2008
Alcedo	1993
Marchena Island	1991
Pinta Island	1928
Santiago Island	1906
Darwin	1813
Ecuador	1150
Santa Cruz Island	Unknown
Floreana Island	Unknown
Genovesa Island	Unknown
San Cristóbal Island	Unknown
Roca Redonda	Unknown
Darwin Island	Extinct
Wolf Island	Extinct
Cerro Pajas	Extinct
Española	Extinct
Pinzon	Extinct
Rabida	Extinct
Santa Fe	Extinct

== Isabela Island ==
Wolf Volcano (also known as Mount Whiton), the highest peak in the Galápagos Islands, is situated on Isabela Island and reaches 1,707 m (5,600 ft). It is a shield volcano with a characteristic upturned soup-bowl shape. Inactive for 33 years, the Wolf Volcano erupted May 25, 2015. A further eruption occurred in early January 2022.

Cerro Azul is a shield volcano on the south western part of Isabela Island, and is one of the most active in the Galapagos, with its last eruption between May and June 2008. Sierra Negra is a large shield volcano at the southeastern end of Isabela Island that rises to an altitude of 1124 m. It coalesces with the volcanoes Cerro Azul to the west and Alcedo to the north. The volcano is one of the most active in the Galapagos, with the last eruption starting on 26 June 2018 and ending on 23 Aug 2018.

Alcedo Volcano is one of the six coalescing shield volcanoes that make up Isabela Island. Alcedo, like the other volcanoes in the Galapagos, has been formed as part of the Galapagos hotspot, which is a mantle plume resulting in a hotspot. The volcano is not directly on the hotspot, which is believed to be under the neighbouring island of Fernandina to the west. However, it is still active, with its last eruption in 1993. Due to the remoteness of Alcedo, historical eruptions are not well recorded. An eruption occurred between 1946 and 1960, as determined from variation in photographs. Another eruption in 1954 is now believed to have taken place on neighbouring Sierra Negra. Even the 1993 eruption was not observed at the time and only recorded after an expedition discovered new craters in 1995.

== Fernandina ==
Fernandina Island (formerly known in English as Narborough Island, after John Narborough), is the third-largest, and youngest, island of the Galápagos Islands. Like the others, the island was formed by the Galápagos hotspot. The island has an active shield volcano, named La Cumbre, whose last eruption was on 15 May 2024.
