= Galápagos hotspot =

Pacific volcanic hotspot

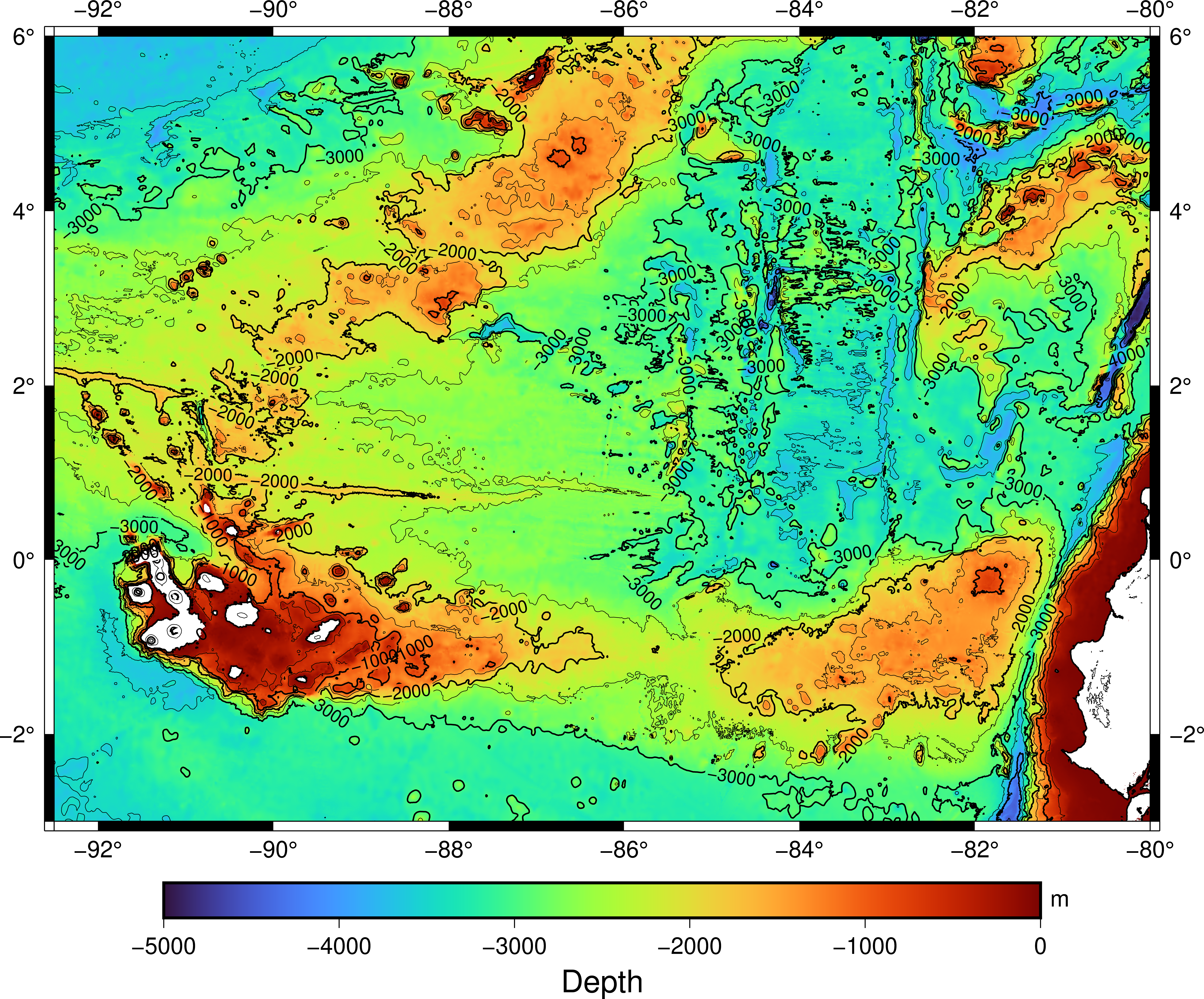
- Bathymetric map of the Galápagos Islands and the effects of the hotspot on the tectonic plates

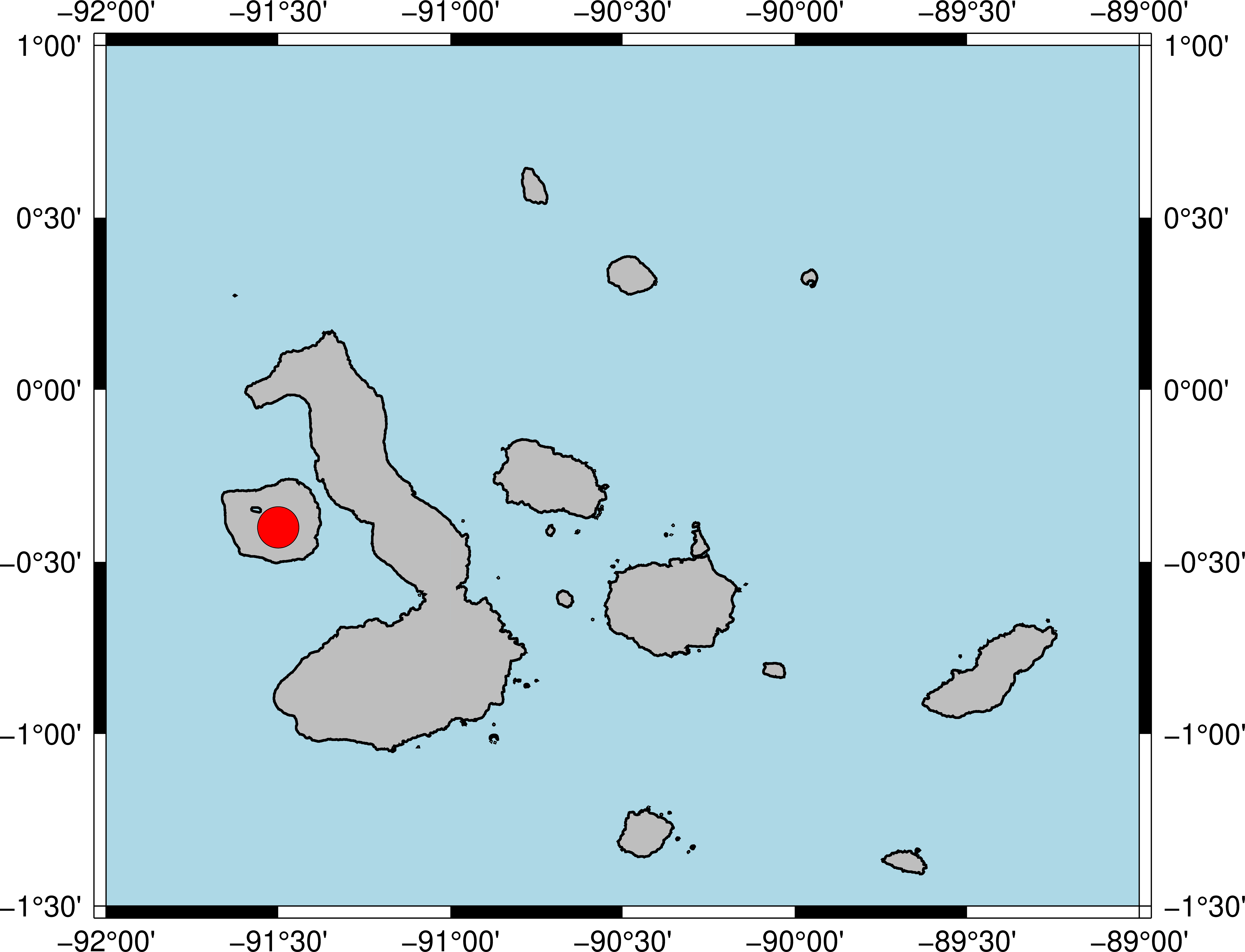
- The Galápagos Islands, with a red dot over Isla Fernandina to show the approximate location of the mantle plume
- Country: Ecuador
- Territory: Galápagos Islands
- Region: Pacific Ocean
- Coordinates: 0.37°S 91.55°W

The Galápagos hotspot is a volcanic hotspot in the East Pacific Ocean responsible for the creation of the Galápagos Islands as well as three major aseismic ridge systems, Carnegie, Cocos and Malpelo which are on two tectonic plates. The hotspot is located near the Equator on the Nazca plate not far from the divergent plate boundary with the Cocos plate. The tectonic setting of the hotspot is complicated by the Galápagos triple junction of the Nazca and Cocos plates with the Pacific plate. The movement of the plates over the hotspot is determined not solely by the spreading along the ridge but also by the relative motion between the Pacific plate and the Cocos and Nazca plates.

The hotspot is believed to be over 20 million years old and in that time there has been interaction between the hotspot, both of these plates, and the divergent plate boundary, at the Galapagos spreading centre. Lavas from the hotspot do not exhibit the homogeneous nature of many hotspots; instead there is evidence of four major reservoirs feeding the hotspot. These mix to varying degrees at different locations on the archipelago and also within the Galapagos spreading centre.

== Hotspot theory ==
In 1963, Canadian geophysicist John Tuzo Wilson proposed the "hotspot" theory to explain why although most earthquake and volcanic activity occurs at plate boundaries, some occurs far from plate boundaries. The theory claimed that small, long-lasting, exceptionally "hot" areas of magma are located under certain points on Earth. These places, dubbed "hotspots", provide localized heat and energy systems (thermal plumes) that sustain long-lasting volcanic activity on the surface. This volcanism builds up seamounts that eventually rise above the ocean current, forming volcanic islands.

As the islands slowly moved away from the hotspot, by the motion of sliding plates as described by the theory of plate tectonics, the magma supply is cut, and the volcano goes dormant. Meanwhile, the process repeats all over again, this time forming a new island, on and on until the hotspot collapses. The theory was developed to explain the Hawaiian-Emperor seamount chain, where historic islands could be traced to the northwest in the direction that the Pacific plate is moving. The early theory put these fixed sources of heat for the plumes deep within the Earth; however, recent research has led scientists to believe that hotspots are actually dynamic, and able to move on their own accord.

== Tectonic setting ==
The Galapagos hotspot has a very complicated tectonic setting. It is located very close to the spreading ridge between the Cocos and Nazca plates; the hotspot interacts with both plates and the spreading ridge over the last twenty million years as the relative location of the hotspot in relation to the plates has varied. Based on similar seismic velocity gradients of the lavas of the Carnegie, Cocos and Malpelos Ridges there is evidence that the hotspot activity has been the result of a single long mantle melt rather than multiple periods of activity and dormancy.

In Hawaii the evidence suggests that each volcano has a distinct period of activity as the hotspot moves under that portion of the Pacific plate before becoming dormant and then extinct and eroding under the ocean. This does not appear to be the case in the Galapagos, instead there is evidence of concurrent volcanism over a wide area. Nearly all Galapagos Islands show volcanism in the recent geological past, not just at the current location of the hotspot at Fernandina. The list below gives the last eruption dates for the Galapagos volcanoes, ordered from West to East.

List of Galápagos volcanoes
| Name | Last eruption |
|---|---|
| La Cumbre | 2024 |
| Wolf | 2022 |
| Sierra Negra | 2018 |
| Cerro Azul | 2008 |
| Alcedo | 1993 |
| Marchena Island | 1991 |
| Pinta Island | 1928 |
| Santiago Island | 1906 |
| Darwin | 1813 |
| Ecuador | 1150 |
| Santa Cruz Island | Unknown |
| Floreana Island | Unknown |
| Genovesa Island | Unknown |
| San Cristóbal Island | Unknown |
| Roca Redonda | Unknown |
| Darwin Island | Extinct |
| Wolf Island | Extinct |
| Cerro Pajas | Extinct |
| Española | Extinct |
| Pinzon | Extinct |
| Rabida | Extinct |
| Santa Fe | Extinct |

The movement of the Nazca and Cocos plates have been tracked. The Nazca plate moves at 90 degrees at a rate of 58±2 km per million years. The Cocos plate moves at 41 degrees at a rate of 83±3 km per million years. The location of the hotspot over time is recorded in the oceanic plate as the Carnegie and Cocos Ridges.

The Carnegie Ridge is on the Nazca plate is 600 km (373 mi) long and up to 300 km (186 mi) wide. It is orientated parallel to the plate movement, and its eastern end is approximately 20 million years old. There is a prominent saddle in the ridge at 86 degrees West where the height drops much closer to the surrounding ocean floor. The Malpelo Ridge, which is 300 km (186 mi) long was once believed to be part of the Carnegie Ridge.

The Cocos Ridge is a 1000 km long feature located on the Cocos plate and is orientated parallel to the plates motion from the 91 degree west transform fault at the Galapagos spreading centre towards the Panamanian coast. The north eastern end of the ridge dates from about 13–14.5 million years ago. However, Cocos Island at the northern end of the ridge is only 2 million years old, and was therefore created at a time well after the ridge had moved away from the hotspot. The presence of a pronounced sedimentary hiatus in sediments on the Cocos Ridge indicates that the Cocos Ridge was probably buckled upon its initial shallow subduction along the Middle American Trench.

The current model for the interaction of the hotspot and the spreading centre between the Cocos and Nazca plates attempts to explain the ridges on both plates; the split between the Carnegie and Malpelo Ridge and subsequent volcanic activity away from the hotspot. There have been eight major phases in the last 20 million years.

1. 19.5 million years – 14.5 million years ago: the hotspot was located on the Nazca plate, forming a combined Carnegie and Malpelo Ridge. The type of lava erupted was a mix of plume material and depleted upper mantle, similar to the type of lava found in the central Galapagos islands at the current time.
2. From 14.5 million years to 12.5 million years ago: the Galapagos spreading centre moved south and the ridge overlay the southern edge of the hotspot. Less material is erupted over the Nazca plate resulted in the saddle being formed in the Carnegie Ridge. The movement of the location of the Galapagos Spreading Centre starts to rift the Malpelo Ridge away from the Carnegie Ridge. The majority of the hotspot lavas are created on the Cocos plate resulting in the formation of the Cocos Ridge. The lavas formed here are similar to the types erupted on the western shield volcanoes of the Galapagos, which are predominantly plume.
3. 12 million years to 11 million years: The Galapagos hotspot is centred under the Galapagos spreading centre. plume-type lavas are now abundant on the Cocos Ridge.
4. 9.5 million years ago: the rifting between the Carnegie and Malpelo Ridges ends.
5. 5.2 million years ago to 3.5 million years ago: the Galapagos spreading centre has another ridge jump, moving northwards with the plume now erupting on the Nazca plate, similar to the present orientation.
6. 3.5 million to 2 million years ago: A short-lived east–west trending spreading centre is formed north of the Galapagos Spreading Centre. This new rift fails but leads to post abandonment volcanic activity and the subsequent formation of the Cocos Island and surrounding seamounts. Around the hotspot plume lavas predominate.
7. 2.6 million years ago: a major transform fault occurs north of the Galapagos hotspot. This results in widespread volcanism in the northern Galapagos along the Wolf Darwin Lineament and around Genovesa Island.
8. Present : The Galapagos hotspot is south of the spreading centre and there is geochemical zonation of the plume.

== Lava chemistry ==
Analysis of the radioactive isotopes of the lavas on the islands of the Galapagos archipelago and on the Carnegie Ridge shows that there are four major reservoirs of magma that mix in varying combinations to form the volcanic province.

The four types are:

- PLUME – this is magma associated with the plume itself and is similar to magmas from other ocean islands within the Pacific. It has the characteristics of intermediate Strontium (Sr), Neodymium (Nd) and Lead (Pb) ratios. The PLUME lavas are found predominantly in the west of the islands, around Ferdinandina and Isabela Islands, which is near to the current position of the hotspot. The PLUME lavas erupted on Fernandina and Isabela are relatively cool. Analysis shows that they are as much as 100 degrees Celsius cooler than those in Hawaii. The cause of this is not fully understood but may be due to cooling in the lithosphere or being relatively cool at formation in the mantle. They are then found in lower quantities in a horseshoe pattern north and south of the central islands mixing with the other reservoirs as it progresses east. PLUME lavas are also found in the lavas from the Galapagos spreading centre due to convection and mixing of all of these lavas. In the upper mantle convection currents bring in mantle material at shallow angles from the south of the Galapagos spreading centre. These convection current will draw in some PLUME type magma to the spreading centre where it is then erupted.
- DGM – (Depleted Galapagos Mantle), this has similar characteristics to ocean ridge basalts throughout the Pacific and the Galapagos Spreading Centre. Partial melting of the upper mantle as a result of the spreading centre will leave mantle material depleted in some compounds. It has low Sr and Pb isotope ratios and high Nd ratios. DGM is found in the central islands of the Galapagos such as Santiago, Santa Cruz, San Cristobal and Santa Fe. It fills in the centre of the horseshoe formed by the PLUME lavas to the west, north and south.
- FLO – (Floreana), characteristic of that island's lavas. It is thought that this reservoir came from subducted ocean crust that has been entrained by the mantle plume. It has enriched Sr and Pb ratios and is enriched with trace elements. FLO is associated principally with the island of Floreana and shows up on the mixing of lavas within the Galapagos along the southern side archipelago and is diluted to the east and north of there.
- WD – (Wolf Darwin) is unique in the Pacific and resembles material from an Indian Ocean Ridge system. It is found on the Wolf and Darwin Islands and the seamounts that connect them along the Wolf Darwin Lineament. It has a unique Pb ratio. WD is located along the northern side of the archipelago and dilutes to the east and south.

== See also ==
- Caribbean large igneous province
- Volcanoes of the Galápagos Islands
