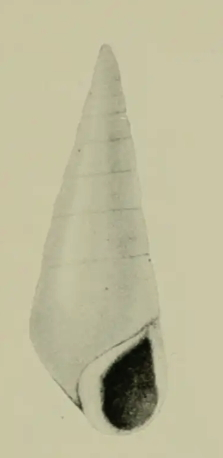
- Shell of Melanella ochsneri (original image)

Scientific classification
- Kingdom: Animalia
- Phylum: Mollusca
- Class: Gastropoda
- Subclass: Caenogastropoda
- Order: Littorinimorpha
- Family: Eulimidae
- Genus: Melanella
- Species: M. ochsneri

Binomial name
- Melanella ochsneri Bartsch, 1917

Synonyms
- Melanella (Melanella) ochsneri Bartsch, 1917 superseded combination

= Melanella ochsneri =

Species of gastropod

Melanella ochsneri is a species of sea snail, a marine gastropod mollusk in the family Eulimidae. The species is one of many species known to exist within the genus, Melanella.

== Description ==
The length of the shell attains 9 mm, its diameter 3 mm.

(Original description) The rather large, shell is almost straight. It is polished, and bluish-white in color. The holotype has lost the apex and probably the first two post-nuclear whorls, with 12 whorls remaining. Two whorls are very slightly rounded and appressed at the summit, which scarcely shows at its junction with the preceding whorls. The basal portion of the preceding whorls shows through the substance of the succeeding whorls in such a manner as to render this more conspicuous than the suture. The body whorl is moderately long and well rounded. The aperture is very small, with a posterior angle that is pinched in and acute; the outer lip is thick, coming to a sharp edge; the inner lip is very strong and slightly oblique; and the parietal wall is covered by a very strong callus, which is reflected over and about the columella and renders the peritreme complete.

== Distribution ==
This species occurs off the Pacific coast of Mexico, Costa Rica and Ecuador (Albemarle Island, Galapagos Islands)
