= Redonda Rock =

Islet in the Galápagos Archipelago

Roca Redonda
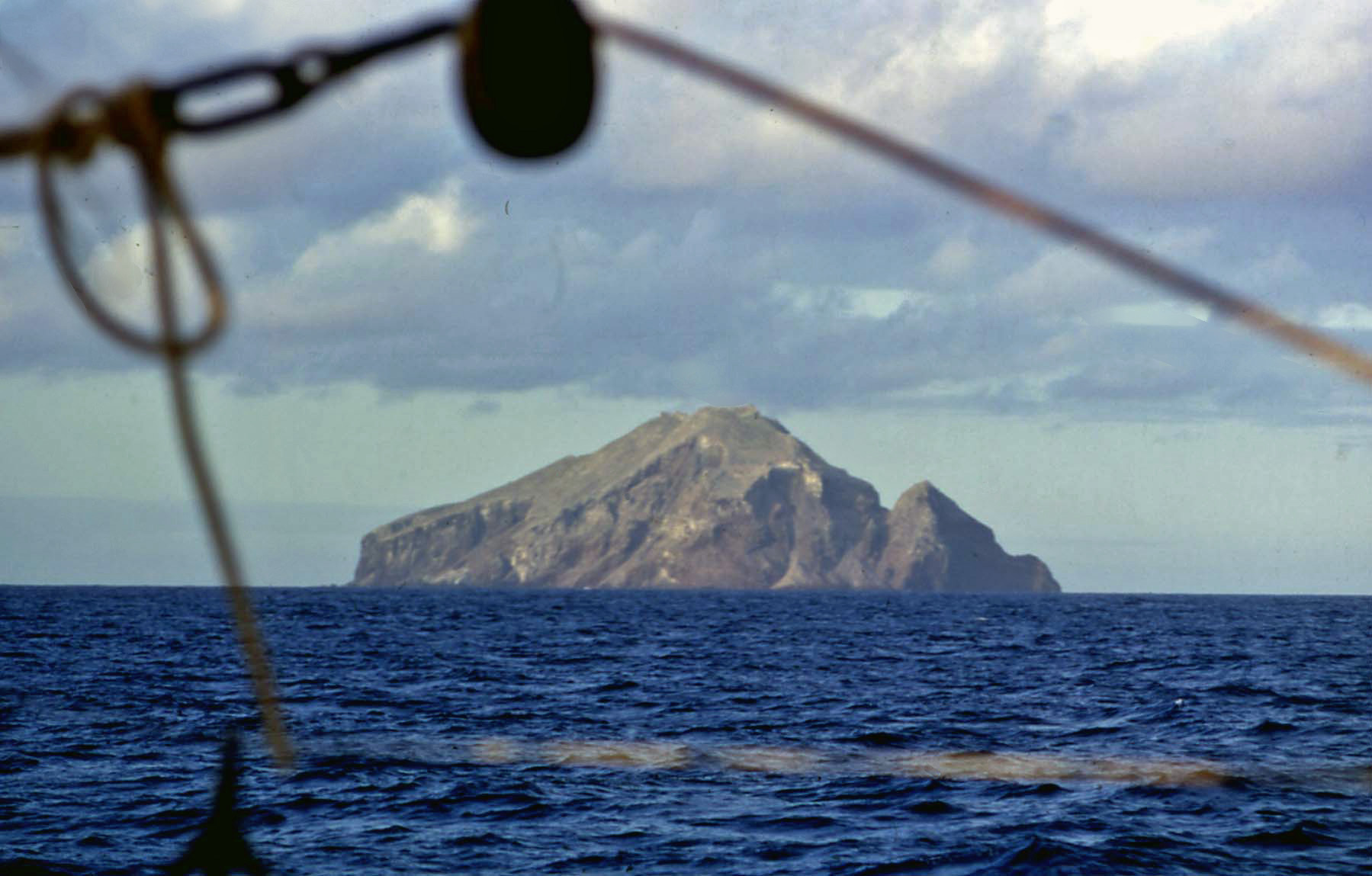
- Roca Redonda

Highest point
- Elevation: 67 m (220 ft)
- Prominence: 67 m (220 ft)
- Coordinates: 0°16′N 91°38′W

Geography
- Location within Galápagos Islands
- Location: Galápagos Islands, Ecuador

Geology
- Mountain type: Shield volcano
- Last eruption: Unknown

Redonda Rock (Note: The name sometimes also appears as Redondo Rock.) (Spanish: Roca Redonda, "Round Rock") is a flat-topped, steep-sided islet located roughly 25 km (16 mi) northwest of the island of Isabela in Ecuador's Galápagos Islands. Redonda measures 100 m (330 ft) long and 50 m (160 ft) wide with a maximum elevation of 67 m (220 ft). Its isolation and inaccessibility coupled with its rocky cliffs riddled with crevices and crossed by ledges has made Redonda a haven for nesting seabirds.

This small volcanic island is the remains of a large shield volcano that has vastly eroded away below sea level. Potassium–argon dating of Redonda indicates that the islet is at least 53,000 years old. However, it remains unknown when the last eruption occurred from the shield volcano. Several shallow submarine fumaroles exist around the island and may indicate that the volcano is still active. Herman Melville described the rock in detail in his short story The Encantadas.

== See also ==
- Volcanoes of the Galápagos Islands
- List of volcanoes in Ecuador
