= Clypeosectus delectus =

Scientific classification
- Kingdom: Animalia
- Phylum: Mollusca
- Class: Gastropoda
- Subclass: Vetigastropoda
- Order: Lepetellida
- Family: Lepetodrilidae
- Genus: Clypeosectus
- Species: C. delectus

Binomial name
- Clypeosectus delectus McLean, 1989

Species of gastropod

Clypeosectus delectus is a species of sea snail, a marine gastropod mollusc in the family Lepetodrilidae.

== Distribution ==
This marine species is found in the Pacific Ocean at thermal vents, Galapagos Rift
