= Cerro Azul (Ecuador volcano) =

Mountain in Ecuador

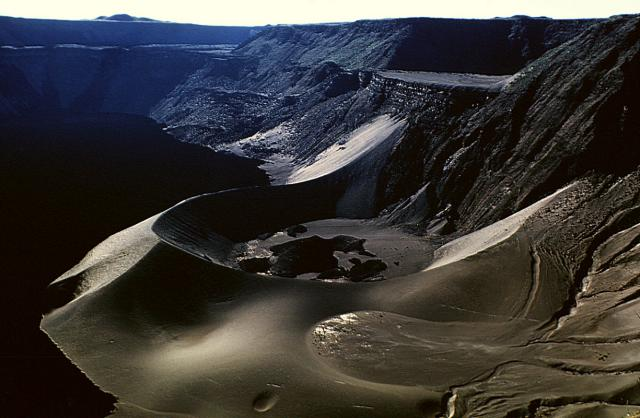
- A large tuff cone occupying the east-northeast side of summit caldera

Highest point
- Elevation: 1,689 m (5,541 ft)
- Prominence: 1,668 m (5,472 ft)
- Listing: Ultra
- Coordinates: 0°55′12″S 91°24′28.8″W

Geography
- Location within Galápagos Islands
- Location: Isabela Island, Galápagos Islands, Ecuador

Geology
- Mountain type: Shield volcano
- Last eruption: 29 May – 17 June 2008

Cerro Azul (Spanish: Blue Hill) is a shield volcano on the south western part of Isabela Island in the Galápagos Islands. At a height of 1,689 m (5,541 ft) it is the second highest peak in the Galapagos and due to its topographic prominence of over 1,500 m (4,921 ft) it is categorised as an ultra. The volcano is one of the most active in the Galapagos, with the last eruption between May and June 2008.

== Geology ==
The Galapagos Islands are believed to be formed from a mantle plume which creates a hotspot of volcanic activity away from plate boundaries where islands then form above it, similar to process that has created the Hawaiian islands. Cerro Azul is at the edge of the upwelling with steep drop offs in the ocean to the West, while the sea is shallower to the east of Isabela Island.

Cerro Azul is one of six coalescing volcanoes on Isabela Island: Ecuador, Wolf, Darwin, Alcedo, and Sierra Negra. Cerro Azul is shaped like a large upturned soup bowl and, like the other volcanoes on Isabela Island, has a large caldera. Its caldera, at 4x5 km across, is one of the smallest. The caldera shows evidence of collapse following eruptive episodes and reaches a depth of 450 m to 650 m below the rim of the caldera; only Wolf Volcano in the Galapagos is as deep. The volcano is 34 by 22 km at maximum and has a volume of 172 km3. It has steep upper slopes of between 12 and 30 degrees. The shape of the volcano is affected by the sharp ocean drop off to the west where this flank of the volcano slopes steeply to the ocean.

Historical eruptions date back to 1932, but the volcano has had a number of active periods since then in 1940, 1943,1949, 1951, 1959, 1968, 1979, 1998 and most recently in 2008. It is estimated that the surface of the volcano is less than 5000 years old and that the volcano itself is about 350,000 years old. The age of Cerro Azul is similar to Sierra Negra and Alcedo, and their positioning is believed to be due to an interaction between the plume and the lithosphere rather than plate movement over the magma plume.

The 2008 eruption began in May and included a fissure eruption on the southeast flank of the volcano; the eruption in 1998 had also included fissure eruptions on this part of the volcano. The fissure eruptions resulted in lava flowing 10 km (6 mi) from the fissure. There was also an eruption within the caldera. A second fissure opened lower down the slope in early June.

Analysis of the lavas on Cerro Azul show a range of tholeiitic to alkalic basalts that are unlike the neighboring Sierra Negra or Alcedo volcanoes.

A study published in 2006 showed that there was continuous expansion of the volcano prior to and after the eruption in 1998. This expansion would have been due to the emplacement of magma into the magma chamber.

== Wildlife ==
The species of Galapagos tortoise on the island is Geochelone vicina. This subspecies is dome-shelled and has an overlapping range with the species on the neighboring Sierra Negra volcano, Geochelone guentheri, which is a saddle-backed tortoise. The Cerro Azul tortoises were not affected by the 2008 eruption, although the 1998 eruption did force the National Park authorities to move the tortoises by land and helicopter. Other tortoises were killed in that eruption, either from lava or associated fires.

== See also ==
- Volcanoes of the Galápagos Islands
- List of volcanoes in Ecuador
