= Theodor Wolf =

German naturalist (1841–1924)

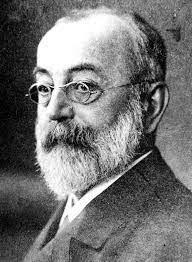
- Born: Theodor Franz Wolf; February 13, 1841; Bartholomä, Kingdom of Württemberg
- Died: June 22, 1924 (aged 83); Dresden, Weimar Republic
- Scientific career
- Fields: Natural History

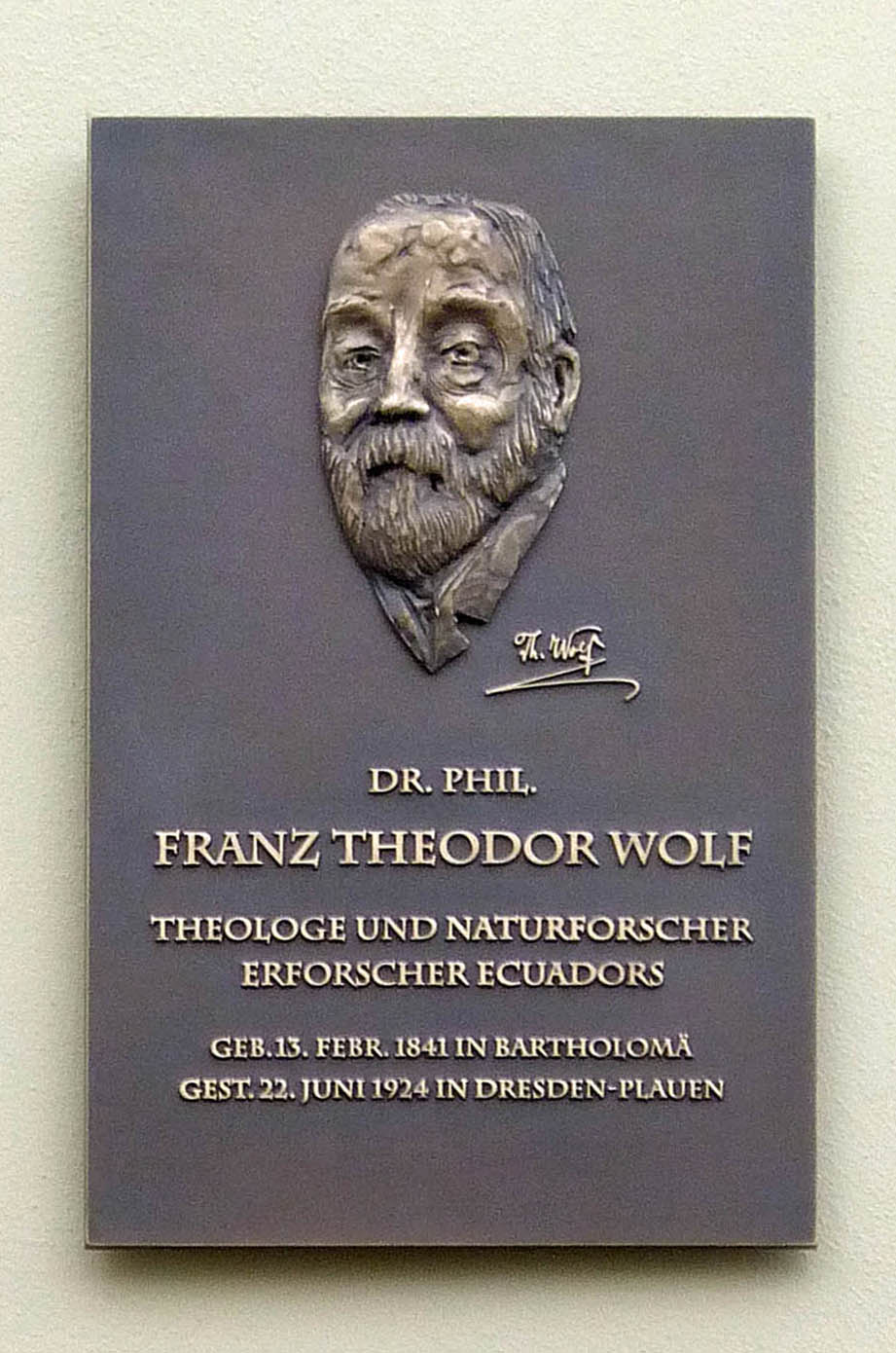
Memorial plaque on his home in Dresden

Franz Theodor Wolf (February 13, 1841 – June 22, 1924) was a German naturalist who studied the Galápagos Islands during the late nineteenth century. Wolf Island (Wenman Island) is named after him. The peak Volcán Wolf on Isabela Island is also named after him. He was born at Bartholomä (in the Ostalbkreis).

He published his Ein Besuch der Galápagos-Inseln, Sammlung von Vortraegen fuer das deutsche Volk (“A Visit to the Galápagos Islands: A Collection of Presentations for the German People”) in 1892. His observations also include notes on the human population on the islands.

He is one of the protagonists of the Golden age of Ecuadorian botany which started in 1870 when Ecuadorian Ecuadorian President and aristocrat Gabriel García Moreno brought members of a German Jesuits Order to manage the National Polytechnic School and the Quito Astronomical Observatory. That consisted of Theodor Wolf, astronomer Juan Bautista Menten, José Kolberg, José Epping, Luis Dressel and botanist Luis Sodiro.

He had performed a geologic survey of mainland Ecuador, but unfortunately his collections were lost in storage when his house caught fire in 1891.

Wolf’s observations, which became the standard interpretation of island geology, depicted the islands as exposed tops of oceanic volcanoes with a distinctly different composition from the volcanic mountains of South America.

As a botanist he described or co-described numerous species within the genus Potentilla.

He died in Dresden.

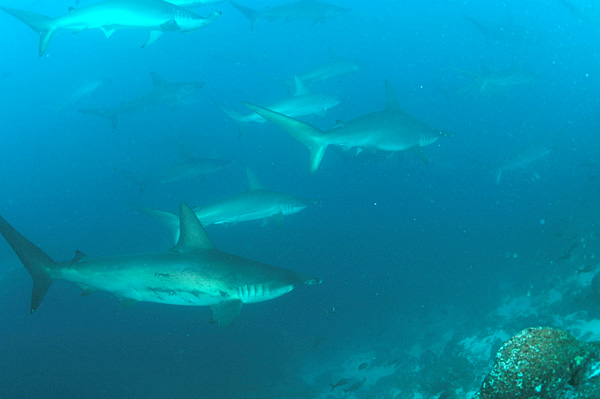
School of scalloped hammerheads, Wolf Island, named after "Theodor Wolf" in the Galapagos Islands
