= Sierra Negra (Galápagos) =

Volcano on the Galapagos island Isabela

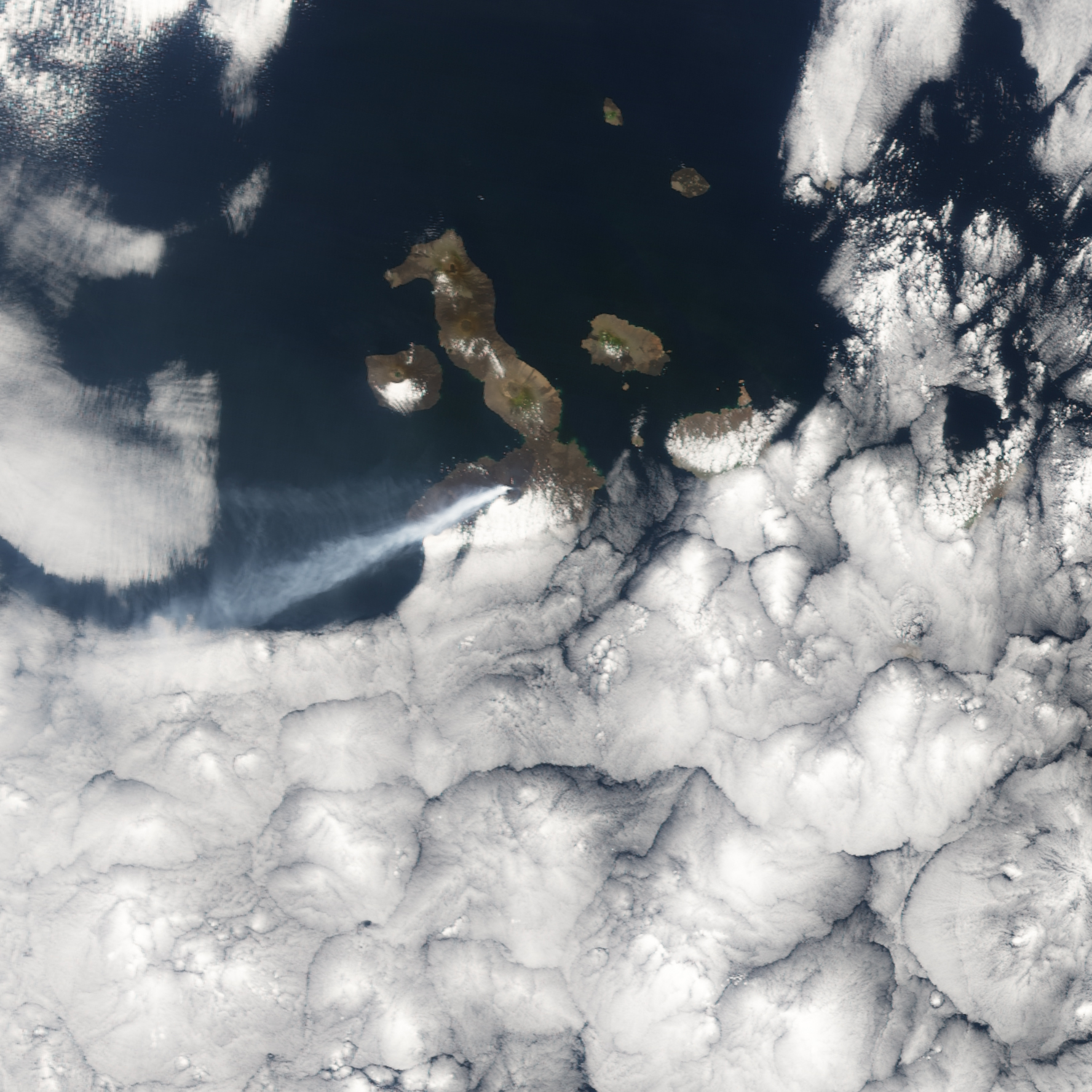
- Eruption of Sierra Negra, 2005-10-25

Highest point
- Elevation: 1,124 m (3,688 ft)
- Coordinates: 0.83°S 91.17°W

Geography
- Location within Galápagos Islands
- Location: Isabela Island, Galápagos Islands, Ecuador

Geology
- Mountain type: Shield volcano
- Last eruption: 27 June – 23 August 2018

Sierra Negra (Spanish: Black Mountain) is a large shield volcano at the southeastern end of Isabela Island in the Galapagos that rises to an altitude of 1124m. It coalesces with the volcanoes Cerro Azul to the west and Alcedo to the north. It is one of the most active of the Galapagos volcanoes with the most recent historic eruption beginning in June 2018 and continuing through the summer.

Guided tours of the volcano typically start at Puerto Villamil and traverse the rim of the caldera along its East side before heading into the fresh lava fields north east of the main crater.

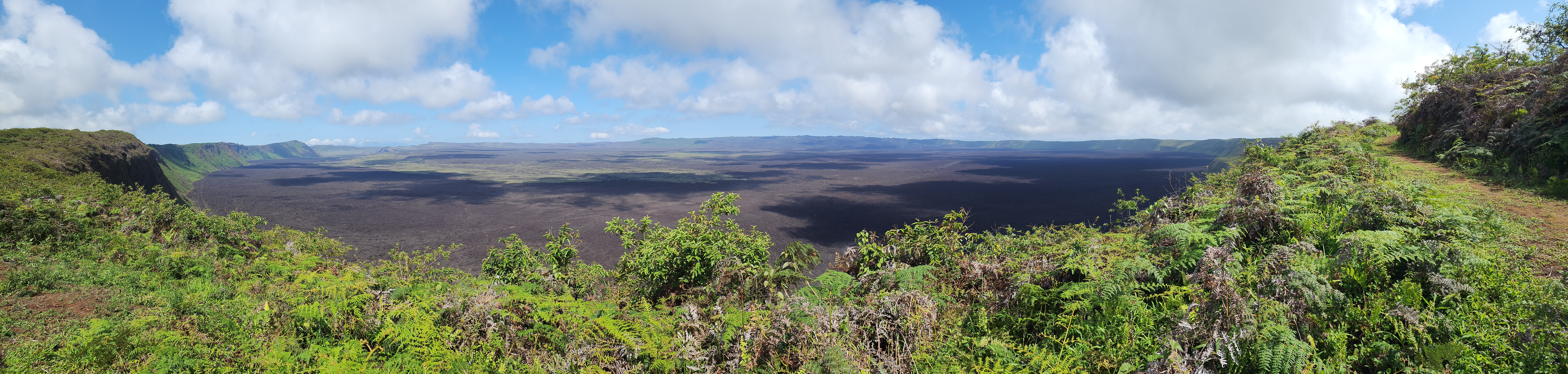
Sierra Negra view from the steeper, southern guided path. A rare, sunny morning view as it is normally shielded by fog and rain. The volcano remains active and is covered by invasive guava trees. Another active volcano can be seen in the far back left of the image.

== Geology ==
The Sierra Negra like the other volcanoes on Isabela is believed to have been created from a mantle plume which has created the hotspot. The age of Sierra Negra and the other volcanoes on Isabela is hard to determine as they are in a north–south line to the east of the hotspot, which is believed to be under Fernandina volcano, and the Nazca Plate is moving east. This puts the volcanoes perpendicular to the hotspot. The surface of Sierra Negra and its neighbouring volcanoes are also covered by young lavas, adding to the difficulty of aging them. An estimate based on volume (588 km^{3}) and eruption rates suggest that Sierra Negra is approximately 535,000 years old.

The morphology of Sierra Negra is the upturned soup bowl shape of the other Isabela volcanoes, however it does not have the steep sloping sides that are on others. Instead the slope goes from approximately 2 degrees at its base and although increasing averages only 5 degrees. The volcano has the largest caldera of all of the Galapagos volcanoes, with dimensions of 7.2 × 9.3 km, with the long axis being south west to north east. The caldera is also the shallowest of the Isabela volcanoes at only 100m. The caldera is structurally complex with a 14 km long ridge within it. A large fumarolic area, Volcan de Azufre, lies between this ridge and the western caldera wall. This fumarolic area is one of the locations where terrestrial sulfur flows have been identified, this is associated with the melting of sulfur deposits.

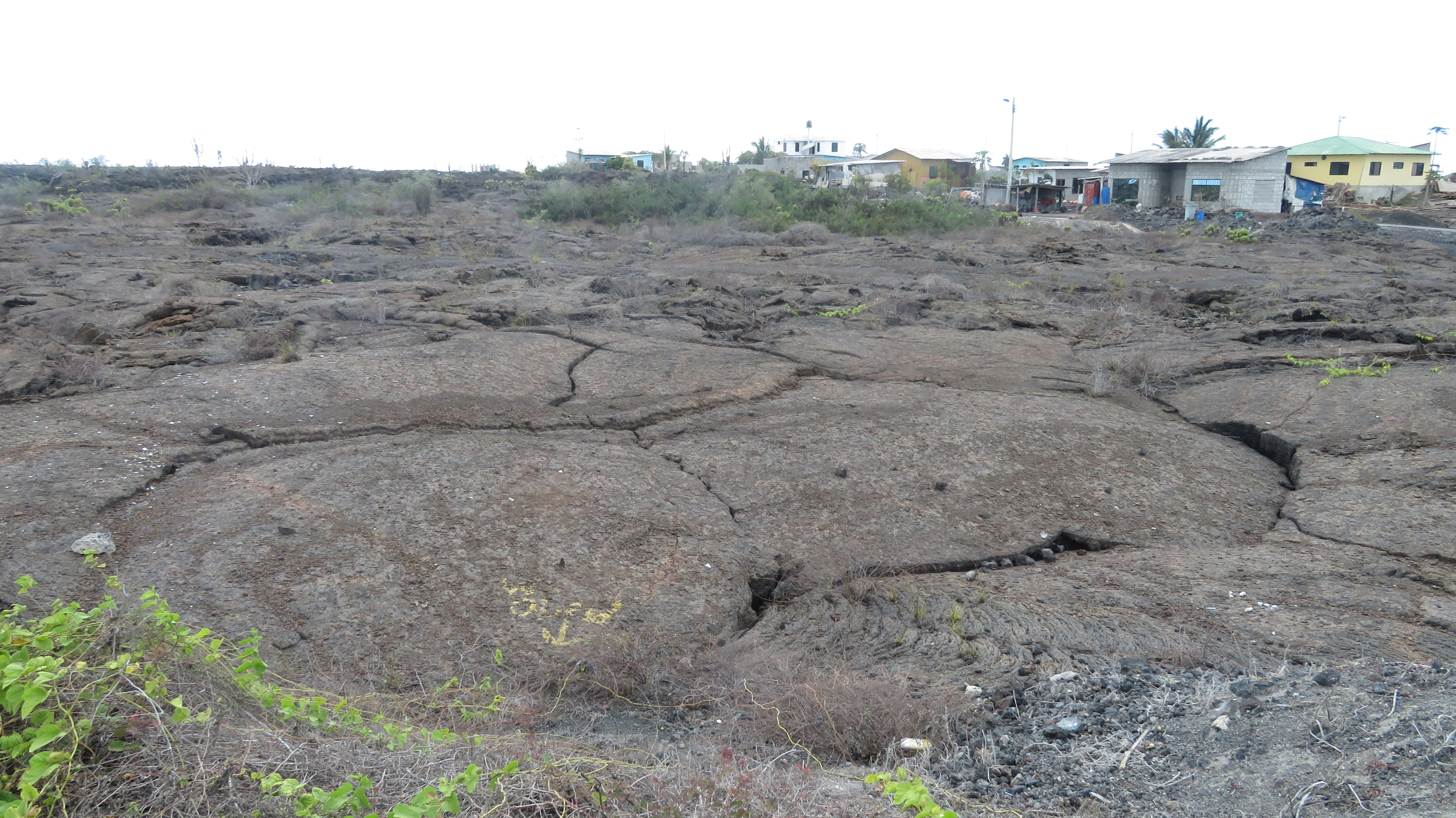
Lava flow near Puerto Villamil

The volcano is one of the most active in the Galapagos, with the most recent eruption beginning on 26 June 2018, only ten days after a nearby Volcano, La Cumbre, also began erupting. A group of scientists predicted this eruption through supercomputer models five months before the eruption actually occurred. The previous eruption began on 22 October 2005 and ended on 30 October 2005. That eruption was estimated to have produced 1.5 × 10^{8} m^{3} of lava. Despite the GPS monitoring on Sierra Negra there was no advance warning of the eruption. There had been expansion of the caldera floor since 1992 but no short term deformational signal was noted before the eruption. Contraction continued through the nine-day eruption before starting again immediately after the eruption ended.

Other eruptions in the historical record are 1911, 1948, 1953, 1954, 1957, 1963, 1979 and 2005. Eruptions in earlier years are recorded by dating lava flows but their location on the volcano and the dates of the eruption are not known precisely.

== Ecology ==
The majority of the 2200 population on Isabela live in the town of Puerto Villamil on the southern shore of the volcano. Consequently, the eastern side of the volcano is partly used for agriculture, with fishing the initial activities of the island's population. Those involved in farming were one of the sources of non native species including cattle and goats, some of which escaped and became feral, other sources were sailors who released goats to provide a source of fresh meat on future trips. Eradication efforts of feral goats were undertaken in Northern Isabela island, north of the Perry isthmus between Sierra Negra and Alcedo volcanoes but not in the southern portion of the island.

While the southern and eastern side of the volcano is covered with lush tropical forest vegetation and fertile soil at moderate altitudes, the higher reaches are more barren with bushes and grasses of modest height of 2–3 meters. The northern side of the volcano is almost entirely devoid of vegetation (with the exception of some cacti) as it has been resurfaced in more recent times by lava flows.

The habitat for the Sierra Negra giant tortoise, Chelonoidis nigra guentheri, which has a saddleback shell, is on the southern and south eastern slopes of the volcano. This species is endangered due to population pressure brought on by hunting, habitat alteration, and predation by feral mammals. C. n. guentheri is part of an ecosystem restoration program in order to recover the population of the tortoises in their natural habitat.

== See also ==
- Volcanoes of the Galápagos Islands
- List of volcanoes in Ecuador
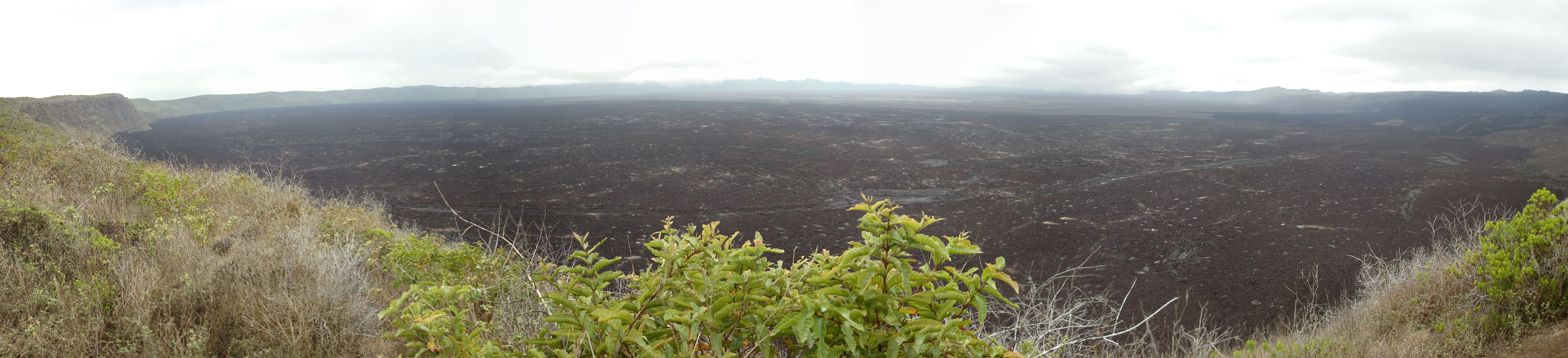
Caldera of the Sierra Negra volcano. The entire floor of the caldera is covered by lava flows from the 2005 eruption with flows emanating from the slightly elevated fissure plateau on the far right of the picture.
