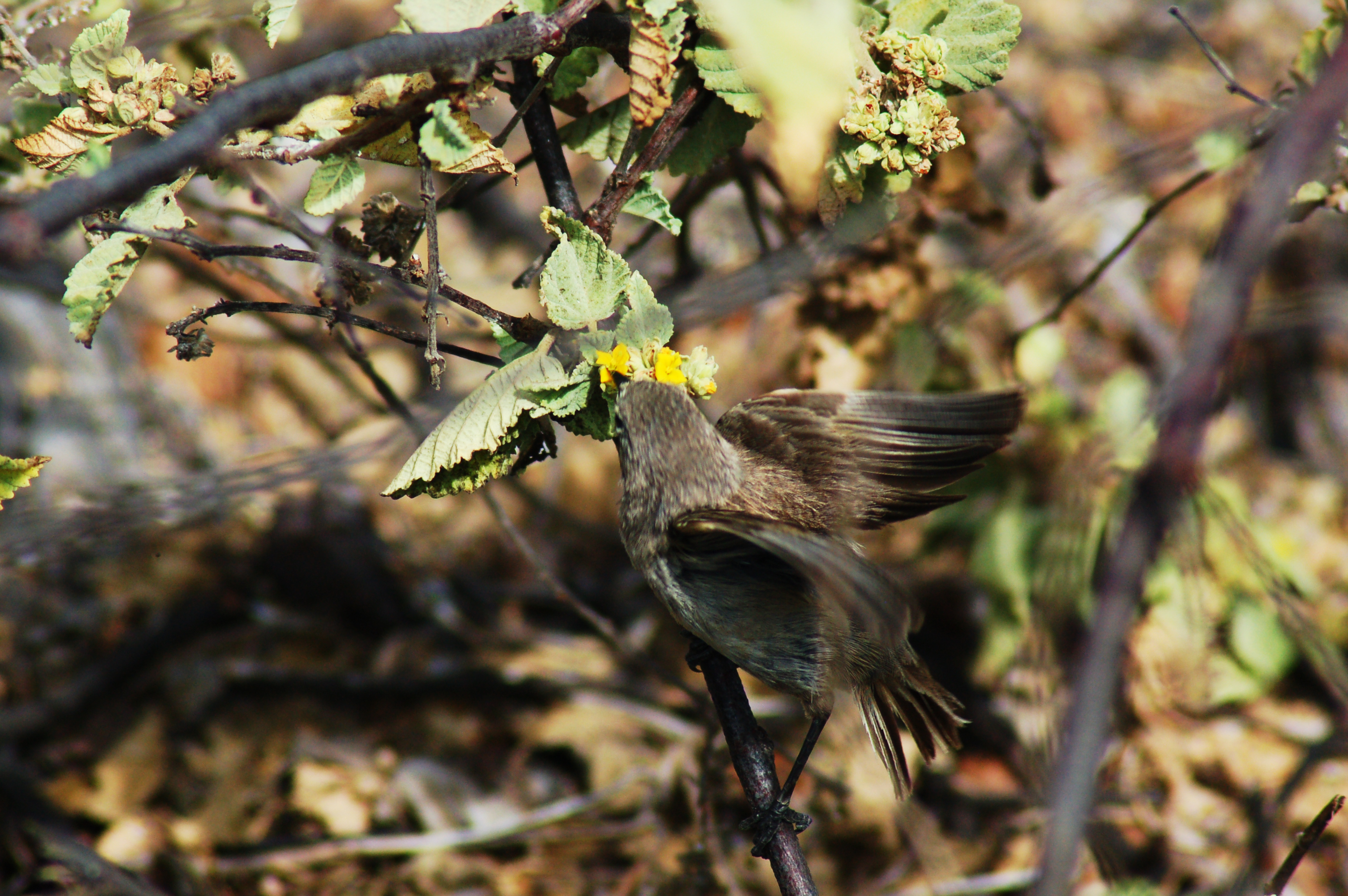

Conservation status
- Vulnerable (IUCN 3.1)

Scientific classification
- Kingdom: Animalia
- Phylum: Chordata
- Class: Aves
- Order: Passeriformes
- Family: Thraupidae
- Genus: Geospiza
- Species: G. septentrionalis

Binomial name
- Geospiza septentrionalis Rothschild & Hartert, 1899

Synonyms
- Geospiza difficilis septentrionalis

= Vampire ground finch =

Species of bird

The Vampire ground finch (Geospiza septentrionalis) or Vampire finch is a small bird native to the Galápagos Islands. A member of the Darwin's finches group, it is known for its unique parasitic behavior of feeding on the blood of other birds. It is endemic to Wolf and Darwin Island. The species was previously considered a very distinct subspecies of the sharp-beaked ground finch (Geospiza difficilis), but the International Ornithologists' Union has split the species based on strong genetic evidence that they are not closely related, and divergences in morphology and song.

== Description ==
The vampire finch is sexually dimorphic as typical for its genus, with the males being primarily black and the females grey with brown streaks. It has a lilting song along with a drawn-out, buzzing call on Wolf, a buzzing song on Darwin, and whistling calls on both islands.

== Diet ==
This bird is most famous for its unusual diet. When alternative sources are scarce, the vampire finch occasionally feeds by drinking the blood of other birds, chiefly the Nazca and blue-footed boobies, pecking at their skin with their sharp beaks until blood is drawn. This behaviour may have evolved as a symbiotic relationship, with the finches removing ectoparasites from the boobies' feathers, but has become a parasitic relationship over time. While boobies will typically swat at pecking finches, several finches may feed on a single booby at once, making defense impractical. The finches also predate the boobies' eggs, making their hosts reluctant to leave their nests to stop the blood-letting. Guano and leftover fish from other predators additionally serve as diet options.

Vampire ground finches drink more blood during dry seasons when seeds and other prey are scarce, resuming omnivory when the rainy season begins. There were also significant variations in the intestinal microbial community structure between species, with a clear separation between vampire ground finches and other finches. Vampire ground finches have intestinal microbial communities rich in peptostreptococcaceae, similar to vampire bats.

More conventionally for birds, but still unusual among Geospiza, they also take nectar from Galápagos prickly pear (Opuntia echios var. gigantea) flowers, at least on Wolf Island. The reason for these peculiar feeding habits is the lack of fresh water on these birds' home islands. Nonetheless, the mainstay of their diet is made up of seeds and invertebrates, like other members of their genus.

== Conservation ==
The vampire finch is classified as vulnerable by the IUCN based on its very restricted distribution and small population. Conservation efforts primarily involve biosecurity measures and restricted access to Darwin and Wolf islands to prevent the spread of disease and invasive species.

As of 2022, fewer than 1,000 mature individuals of the vampire ground finch are estimated to inhabit their range. This isolated population makes it vulnerable to potential threats such as the invasive avian vampire fly (Philornis downsi) and viruses like the avian pox, though neither of these threats have yet been reported on Wolf or Darwin islands.
