= List of volcanoes in Ecuador =

This is a list of active and extinct volcanoes in Ecuador.

In Ecuador, EPN monitors the volcanic activity in this Andean nation.

== Mainland ==
Major volcanoes in Ecuador

Name	Meters	Feet	Coordinates	Last Eruption
El Altar / Kapak Urku	5405	17,730	1.68°S 78.42°W	Unknown
Antisana	5753	18,870	0.481°S 78.14°W	1802
Atacazo	4463	14,639	0.353°S 78.617°W	320 BCE
Carihuairazo	5018	16,463	01°24′25″S 78°45′00″W	Unknown
Cayambe	5790	18,991	0.029°N 77.986°W	1786
Chakana	4643	15,229	0.37°S 78.25°W	1773
Chiles	4756	15,616	0°47′52″N 77°57′3″W	1936
Chimborazo	6310	20,560	01°28′09″S 78°49′03″W	640 AD ± 500 years
Corazón	4790	15,715	0.43°S 77.72°W	Holocene
Cotacachi	4944	16220	0°21′39″N 78°20′57″W	Holocene
Cotopaxi	5897	19,347	0.677°S 78.436°W	2023
Cuicocha	3246	10,649	0°18′30″N 78°21′50″W	950 BCE
Cusín	4012	-	0.15°N 78.14°W	-
Illiniza	5248	17,213	0.659°S 78.714°W	Holocene
Imbabura	4557	14,952	0.26°N 78.18°W	Late Pleistocene
Licto	3336	10,945	1.78°S 78.613°W	Holocene-Pleistocene
Mojanda	4263	13,983	0.13°N 78.27°W	Holocene
Ninahuilca				
Pan de Azucar	3482	11,424	0.43°S 77.72°W	Holocene
Pasochoa	4200	–	0.46°S 78.48°W	Extinct
Guagua Pichincha	4784	15,692	0.171°S 78.598°W	2004
Pilavo			8°31′N 78°22′W	20,000/40,000 – 8,000 years before present
Pululagua	3356	11,008	0.038°N 78.463°W	467 BCE
Quilindaña	4823	15,821	0.780°S 78.329°W	200,000 years before present
Quilotoa	3914	12,838	0.85°S 78.90°W	1797
Reventador	3562	11,683	0.007°S 77.65°W	2008–present
Rumiñawi	4721	15,489	0°38′0″S 78°32′0″W	Unknown
Sangay	5188	17,017	2.03°S 78.34°W	2020
Sincholagua	4873	–	0°32′44.86″S 78°21′59.69″W	1877
Soche	3955	12,972	0.552°N 77.580°W	6650 BCE
Sumaco	3990	13,087	0.53°S 77.62°W	1933
Tulabug	3336	10,942	1.78°S 78.613°W	Holocene
Tungurahua	5023	16,475	1.467°S 78.442°W	2018
Yanaurcu	4535	14,879	0.49849°N 78.33389°W	60,600 ± 20,000 years ago

== Galápagos Islands ==
Name	Meters	Feet	Coordinates	Last Eruption
Alcedo	1130	3706	0.43°S 91.12°W	1993
Cerro Azul	1640	5379	0.90°S 91.42°W	2008
Darwin	1330	4362	0.18°S 91.28°W	1813
Ecuador	790	2591	0.02°S 91.546°W	1150
Fernandina Island (La Cumbre)	1495	4904	0.37°S 91.55°W	2020
Cerro Pajas	640	2099	1.30°S 90.45°W	Holocene
Galápagos Rift	-2430	-7972	0.792°N 86.15°W	1996
Genovesa	64	210	0.32°N 89.958°W	-
Marchena	343	1125	0.33°S 90.47°W	1991
Pinta	780	2558	0.58°S 90.75°W	1928
San Cristóbal	759	2490	0.88°S 89.50°W	-
Santa Cruz	964	2834	0.62°S 90.33°W	-
Santiago	920	3018	0.22°S 90.77°W	1906
Sierra Negra	1124	3687	0.83°S 91.17°W	2018
Wolf	1710	5609	0.02°N 91.35°W	2022
