= Darwin's Arch =

Rock arch near Darwin Island (collapsed 2021)

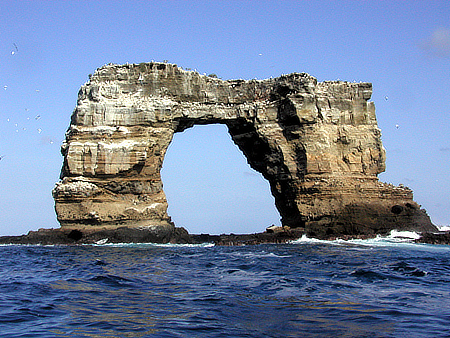
- Darwin's Arch, 2006

- Location within Galápagos Islands Location within Pacific Ocean

Geography
- Location: Southeast of Darwin Island, Galápagos Islands, Ecuador
- Coordinates: 1°40′19.2″N 91°59′26.6″W
- Archipelago: Galápagos Islands

Administration
- Ecuador

Darwin's Arch (Spanish: Arco de Darwin) was a natural rock arch feature to the south-east of Darwin Island in the Galápagos Archipelago in the Pacific Ocean, and is now a pillar formation. The arch sat on an irregularly shaped, rocky, submerged plateau, nicknamed "the theatre". The arch collapsed into the sea on 17 May 2021 from natural erosion.

Darwin's Arch, along with the nearby Darwin Island, was named after English naturalist Charles Darwin, whose studies in the surrounding area helped him to form his theory of evolution by means of natural selection. As a tribute to Darwin and his works, some locals and industry professionals have nicknamed the remaining stone "towers" the Pillars of Evolution (Spanish: Los Pilares de la Evolución).

== Geography ==
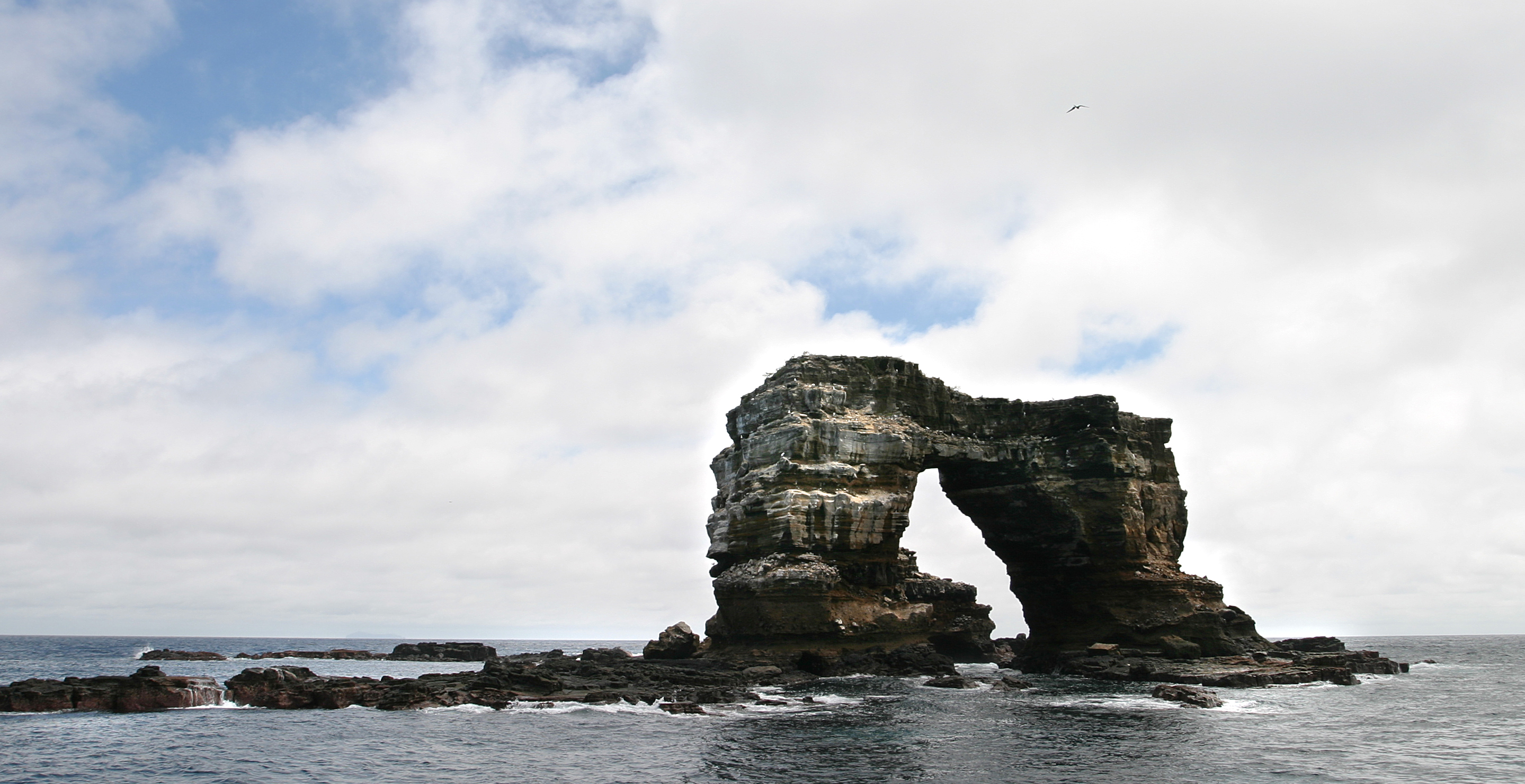
Darwin's Arch and partial view of the plateau, 2003

Part of Ecuador's Galápagos Archipelago, Darwin Island is a small, uninhabited island with an area of 2.33 square kilometres (0.90 sq mi) and an elevation of 168 metres (551 ft). Darwin's Arch was 1 kilometre (0.62 mi) to the southeast of the island and had a bridge-like appearance, which had been caused by erosion. The plateau's wall drops away into the sea, and the arch's ocean side featured a "viewing platform" at 18 metres (59 ft). The arch was 43 metres (141 ft) high, 70 metres (230 ft) long, and 23 metres (75 ft) wide.

== Fauna ==
From its southern tip to the sloping channel, the marine fauna seen are scalloped hammerheads, manta rays, big-eye jacks, bonito, yellowfin tuna, dolphins, big schooling of species of pelagic fish, and also whale sharks of up to 14 metres (45 ft) in length. The whale sharks are found from early July. Other marine fauna include Moorish idols, Galapagos sharks, eagle rays, green turtles, hawksbill turtles, silkie and white-tipped reef sharks, barracuda and black jack sharks. Many birds are endemic and the species commonly noted is the sooty tern (Sterna fuscata), which breeds on Darwin Island.

== Tourism ==
The arch was popular with photographers and cruise-ship tours. The rich wildlife around the arch made it a popular scuba diving location. As with Darwin Island, tourists were not permitted to set foot on the arch. The surrounding area of the Galápagos Islands was declared a UNESCO World Heritage Site in 1978.

== Collapse ==
On 17 May 2021, at 11:20 a.m. Galápagos Time (UTC–6), the arch collapsed through natural erosion. A post from Ecuador's Ministry of Environment and Water stated that "this event was a consequence of natural erosion. Darwin's Arch is made of natural stone that at one time would have been part of Darwin Island, which is not open to visits by land." The event was witnessed by divers aboard the Galapagos Aggressor III.

Following the collapse of the arch, the remaining columns of rock have been nicknamed the "Pillars of Evolution" (Spanish: Los Pilares de la Evolución) by locals in the tourism and diving industry. The nickname alludes to the arch and the nearby island having been named after Charles Darwin, whose studies of the surrounding area's wildlife contributed to the inception of his theory of evolution by means of natural selection.
