= Volcán Wolf =

Highest mountain in the Galápagos Islands

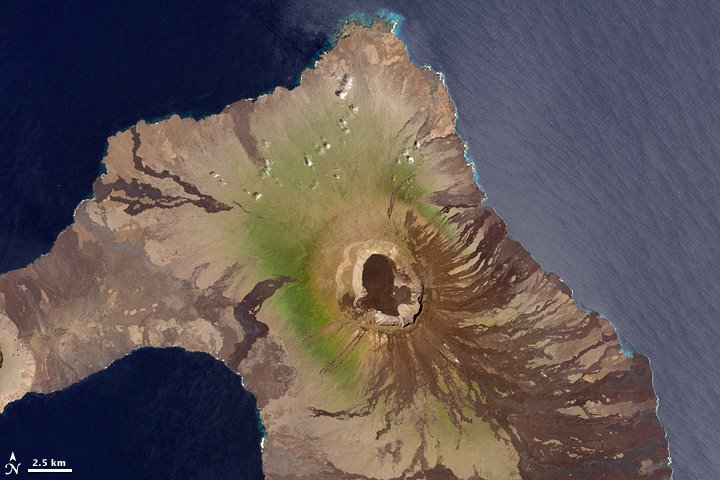
- Wolf Volcano, 2001, NASA Landsat 7 image

Highest point
- Elevation: 1,710 m (5,610 ft)
- Prominence: 1,710 m (5,610 ft)
- Listing: Ultra
- Coordinates: 0°0′00″N 91°20′00″W

Geography
- Location within Galápagos Islands
- Location: Isabela Island, Galápagos Islands

Geology
- Mountain type: Shield volcano
- Last eruption: 7 January 2022

Wolf Volcano (Spanish: Volcán Wolf), also known as Mount Whiton, is the highest peak in the Galápagos Islands. It is situated on Isabela Island and reaches 1,710 m (5,610 ft). It is a shield volcano with a characteristic upturned soup bowl shape.

The volcano was named after Theodor Wolf, a German geologist who studied the Galápagos Islands in the 19th century. Wolf Island in the north of the Galápagos is also named after the geologist.

Wolf Volcano's height makes it an ultra prominent peak (a peak with a topographic prominence of over 1,500 m (4,900 ft)).

== Geology ==
In a process similar to the formation of the Hawaiian islands, the Galapagos (along with associated hotspot) appear to be created from a mantle plume. This plume stays in place while the Nazca Plate moves above it; the relative movement of this plate is 0.46 degrees per million years. The volcano itself is estimated to be less than half a million years old; the oceanic plate beneath it is theorized to be around 10 million years old.

Wolf is situated at the northern end of Isabela Island in the Galapagos, and sits on the equator, one of six coalescing volcanoes that make up this island (the others being Ecuador, Darwin, Alcedo, Sierra Negra, and Cerro Azul). Along with the Fernandina Island volcano, the western Galapagos volcanoes have similar structures that differ from the volcanoes in the eastern part of the archipelago. The western volcanoes are higher and have larger calderas than those to the east, they are also shaped like an upturned soup bowl.

Wolf reaches a height of over 1,700 metres (5,600 ft); the caldera is 6 by 7 km (3.7 by 4.3 mi) and has a depth of 700 m (2,300 ft). Only Cerro Azul has a caldera of similar depth in the Galapagos. Following the last eruption, there was collapse in the caldera, causing its stepped appearance. Wolf has very steep slopes reaching 35 degrees in places, making access difficult. The first historical eruption in the Galapagos was recorded for this volcano in 1797; a further eleven eruptions have been recorded since then, the last being in Early January 2022. Eruptions prior to 1797 have been dated from analysis of surface exposures. The newest lavas are on the eastern and southern sides as well as within the caldera.

Lava flows from Wolf are unusual for a mid-ocean island and also differ from the two volcanoes next to it, Ecuador and Darwin, and other volcanoes closer to the centre of the plume. The lavas from Wolf are similar to those erupted from the Galapagos Spreading Center, a mid-ocean ridge over 200 km (120 mi) away, which may be due to interaction between the plume, which is centred on Fernandina, and the upper mantle.

== Wildlife ==
As is common in the Galapagos, Wolf Volcano has unique fauna, differing from not only the other islands in the group but also its neighbouring volcanoes on the same island. It has its own subspecies of Galapagos tortoise, Chelonoidis nigra becki which has a saddleback shell and is found on the northern and western slopes of the volcano, away from the more recent lava flows where there is denser vegetation. However, tortoise subspecies from many different Galapagos islands have been abandoned at Wolf Volcano by ships which at one time collected the tortoise as a food source. C. n. becki is threatened due to population pressures such as predation by feral cats. During a 2008 survey of over 1600 specimens on Wolf Volcano, all morphologies of tortoise were found, including two that in shape are similar to Lonesome George. DNA studies of these specimens are currently being undertaken.

In 2009, a new species of land iguana, the pink land iguana, was identified on the slopes of Wolf Volcano. The pink land iguana had been discovered by park rangers in 1986 and studied by scientists since 2000, and identified as a separate species in 2009. Scientists are unsure where the species developed, as it is believed to have separated from the other land iguana of Galapagos prior to the formation of Wolf volcano or Isabela Island.

== Ecology ==
The natural habitat is under threat from the introduction of goats. The Galapagos National Park has instituted Project Isabela to eradicate feral goats from around Wolf.

== Eruptions ==
2015 eruption

Inactive for 33 years, the Wolf volcano erupted 25 May 2015. The volcano is not located near a populated area. The lava flowed down the volcano's east and southeast sides, so the pink land iguana inhabiting the north and west sides were not endangered.

2022 eruption

On 7 January 2022, Ecuador's Geophysical Institute announced that shortly before midnight (local time) on Wednesday, 5 January 2022, Wolf volcano sent a cloud of ashen lava 3,793 meters (12,444 feet) into the sky.

== See also ==
- Volcanoes of the Galápagos Islands
- List of volcanoes in Ecuador
