= Clypeosectus curvus =

Scientific classification
- Kingdom: Animalia
- Phylum: Mollusca
- Class: Gastropoda
- Subclass: Vetigastropoda
- Order: Lepetellida
- Family: Lepetodrilidae
- Genus: Clypeosectus
- Species: C. curvus

Binomial name
- Clypeosectus curvus McLean, 1989

Species of gastropod

Clypeosectus curvus is a species of sea snail, a marine gastropod mollusc in the family Lepetodrilidae.

== Distribution ==
This marine species is found at thermal vents in the Juan de Fuca Ridge.
