= Clypeosectus =

Scientific classification
- Kingdom: Animalia
- Phylum: Mollusca
- Class: Gastropoda
- Subclass: Vetigastropoda
- Order: Lepetellida
- Family: Lepetodrilidae
- Genus: Clypeosectus; McLean, 1989

Genus of gastropods

Clypeosectus is a genus of sea snails, marine gastropod molluscs in the family Lepetodrilidae.

== Species ==
Species within the genus Clypeosectus include:

- Clypeosectus curvus McLean, 1989
- Clypeosectus delectus McLean, 1989
