= Chacana =

- Location within Ecuador

Highest point
- Elevation: 4,643 m (15,233 ft)
- Coordinates: 00°22′30″S 78°15′00″W

Geography
- Location: Ecuador

Geology
- Mountain type: Caldera
- Last eruption: 1773

Chacana is a large 32-km long - 18–24 km wide caldera that has erupted in historical times. It forms one of the largest rhyolite centers in the Northern Andes with major eruptions over the past 240,000, 180,00, and 160,000 years ago and has had andesitic-rhyolitic volcanism. With dacitic lava flows continuing into historical times. Lava domes were also constructed in the Holocene. Chacana is located 30 km from Quito and the large Antisana volcano is constructed to the southeast.

== Eruptions ==
Eruptions in the past 10,000 years have been limited to small lava flows originating from Fissures.

- 1760 Eruption: A small (VEI 0) Eruption, the first in historical time, came from a flank vent on the SW of the Caldera which caused some damage.
- 1773 Eruption: Another small eruption took place in 1773. It came from a fissure in the South part of the caldera.

== See also ==
- Lists of volcanoes
  - List of volcanoes in Ecuador
