= Ninahuilca =

Volcano in Ecuador

- Location within Ecuador

Highest point
- Coordinates: 0.3535°S 78.617°W

Ninahuilca is a volcano in the Western Cordillera of Ecuador. It is southwest of Atacazo.
