= Volcán Darwin =

Lava shield in Ecuador

Darwin
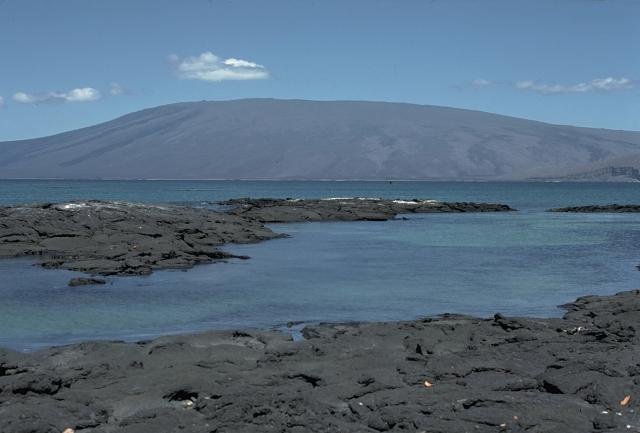

Highest point
- Prominence: 1,330 m (4,360 ft)
- Coordinates: 0.18°S 91.28°W

Geography
- Location: Galapagos Islands, Ecuador
- Parent range: Galapagos Hotspot

Geology
- Mountain type: Shield volcano
- Last eruption: 1813

Volcán Darwin is a large shield volcano on Isabela Island in the Galápagos Islands. It was named after the naturalist Charles Darwin and is located between Volcán Wolf and Volcán Alcedo; part of the World Heritage Site designated area. The volcano last erupted in 1813 and it features a caldera measuring 5 km (3.1 mi) across and 200 m (660 ft) deep. Along the western slopes are two pyroclastic cones, called Tagus and Beagle cones. The walls of Tagus Cone is partially breached and flooded, forming a cove. Tagus Cove is a popular tourist destination and was historically important for whalers. Charles Darwin's ship, HMS Beagle also anchored in this cove.
