= Alcedo Volcano =

Alcedo
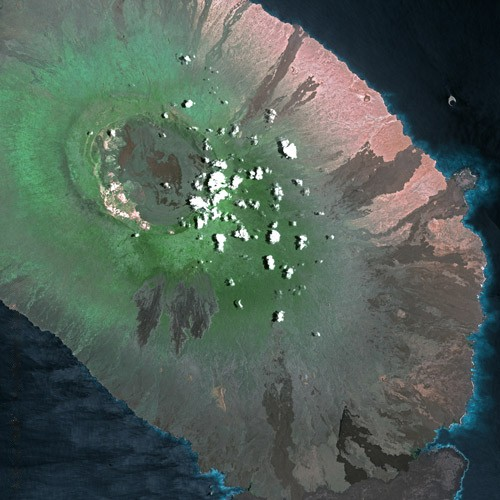
- Alcedo Volcano from SPOT Satellite image

Highest point
- Elevation: 1,130 m (3,710 ft)
- Coordinates: 0°26′S 91°07′W

Geography
- Location within Galápagos Islands
- Location: Isabela Island, Galápagos Islands, Ecuador

Geology
- Mountain type: Shield volcano
- Last eruption: December 1993

Alcedo Volcano is one of the six coalescing shield volcanoes that make up Isabela Island in the Galapagos. The remote location of the volcano has meant that even the most recent eruption in 1993 was not recorded until two years later. It is also the only volcano in the Galapagos to have erupted rhyolite and basaltic lava.

The volcano has the largest number of wild tortoises of any of the volcanoes in the Galapagos, though their genetic diversity is amongst the lowest of any of the breeds in the archipelago. The habitat of the tortoises was threatened when feral goats crossed from southern Isabela Island in the 1970s and then reproduced rapidly.

== Geology ==
It is believed that Alcedo volcano emerged from the sea approximately 313,000 years ago, based on its sub -aerial volume of 234 km^{3} and average eruption rate of 1 million m^{3} per year. This has produced a volcano that is 1130m high with a caldera that measures 6.1 x 7.4 km. Alcedo volcano is similar to its neighbours to the north, Darwin and to the south, Sierra Negra which also have shallow slopes for the majority of their height. It is also similar to these two in that the depth of the caldera is less than 25% of the height of the volcano. This contrasts with the other major shield volcanoes, Cerro Azul, Wolf on Isabela and Fernandina that have much steeper slopes and have calderas that have a depth which is 40-60% of the sub-aerial height.

Alcedo, like the other volcanoes in the Galapagos, has been formed as part of the Galapagos hotspot which is a mantle plume resulting in a hotspot. The volcano is not directly on the hotspot, which is believed to be under the neighbouring island of Fernandina to the west. However, it is still active with the last eruption in 1993. Due to the remoteness of Alcedo historical eruptions are not well recorded. There was an eruption between 1946 and 1960, as determined from variation in photographs. Another eruption in 1954 is now believed to have taken place on neighbouring Sierra Negra. Even the 1993 eruption was not observed at the time and only recorded after an expedition discovered new craters in 1995

It is the only volcano in the Galapagos to have erupted Rhyolite lavas. Approximately 1 km^{3} of Rhyolite was erupted in total, a small amount compared to its sub-aerial volume. The eruption of this began about 120,000 years ago in a series of eruptions, the largest of these has resulted in a tephra covering on the eastern slopes. Following the rhyolite eruption there has been a return to basaltic lava eruptions. It is theorised that the change in volcanic output is due to the movement of Alcedo away from the hotspot, which has resulted in the changing chemical makeup of the magma being supplied to the magma chamber.

There is a hydrothermal system within Alcedo, the temperature of the water released is less than 97 degrees Celsius, though chemical analysis has shown that the reservoir temperature is over 260 degrees Celsius. The analysis has also shown that the residence time, the time that water remains in the hydrothermal system, is approximately 400 years and that the source of the water is from rainfall.

== Wildlife ==
In a 2003 study of the species of Galapagos tortoise on Alcedo, Chelonoidis vandenburghi, the genetic diversity was shown to be much lower than would be expected in a population of its size, currently estimated to be approximately 4000. The Alcedo tortoise has the largest wild populations in the Galapagos Islands, however, the genetic diversity was 3-5 times less than that of other sub species of Galapagos tortoise. This low diversity is believed to be caused by a massive reduction in the population approximately 100,000 years ago. The reduction in population to only a few individuals is believed to have been caused by a large eruption of Alcedo volcano. The Alcedo tortoise has managed to rebuild its population since that time. Since the islands discovery by man it has come under new pressure, as have other Galapagos tortoises. They were hunted by early sailors to the islands as tortoises provided a food source on subsequent voyages. The introduction of non-native species also affected the habitat of the tortoise and other fauna and flora on Alcedo.

For many years it was believed that feral goats would not be able to cross the Perry Isthmus, a 12 km wide lava field, from southern Isabela to northern Isabela Island. However, goats were recorded as having crossed this in the early 1970s and by 1998 it was estimated that the population was between 75,000 and 125,000. The goats affected the environment that was detrimental to the native tortoises, eating plants that were the food source for them. The removal of the plants also meant that watering holes dried up. To combat this Project Isabela was undertaken to eradicate the goats from northern Isabela island by the National Park and the Charles Darwin Foundation. The project was completed in 2006 with all goats on northern Isabela Island being removed, following the project there has been a rapid recovery of small trees and shrubs that are associated with the native habitat.

== See also ==
- List of volcanoes in Ecuador
