= La Cumbre (Galápagos Islands) =

Shield volcano on Fernandina Island

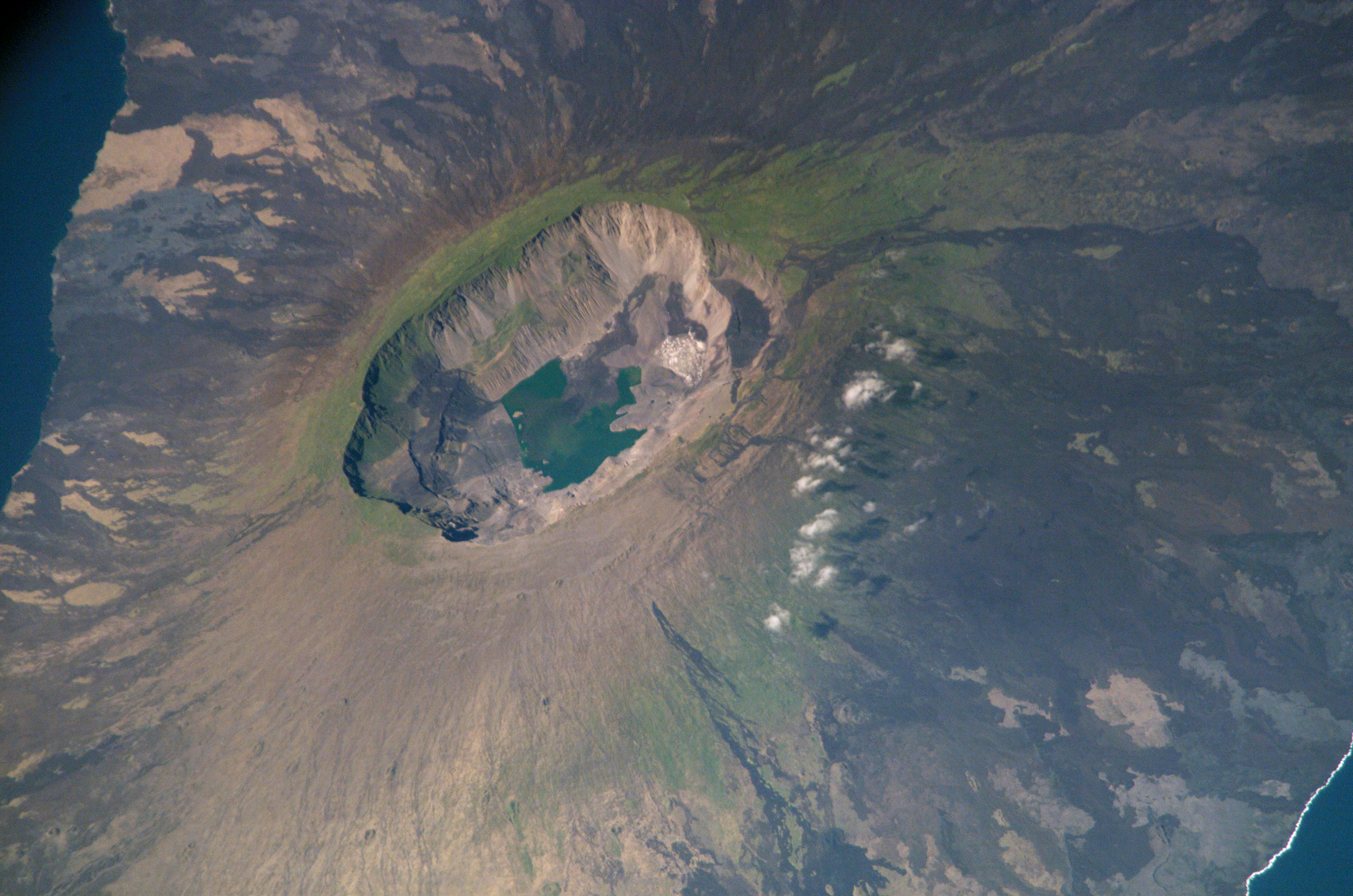
- La Cumbre, as seen from the International Space Station, July 2002

Highest point
- Elevation: 1,476 metres (4,843 ft)
- Coordinates: 0°22′S 91°33′W

Geography
- Location: Fernandina Island, Galápagos Islands

Geology
- Mountain type: Shield volcano
- Last eruption: March 2024

La Cumbre is a shield volcano on Fernandina Island in the Galápagos Islands. La Cumbre is also the youngest volcano in the Galápagos Islands.

== History ==
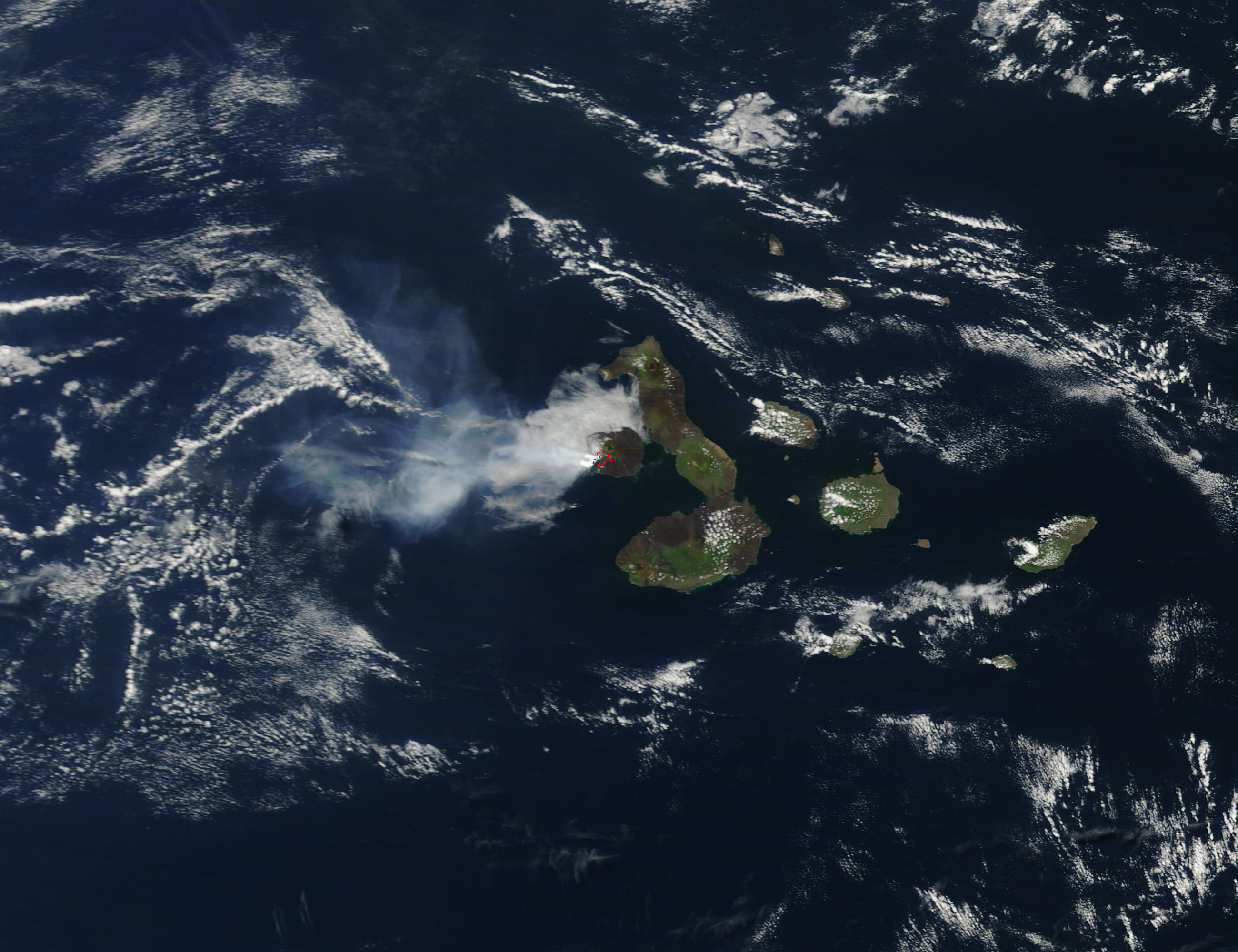
Fernandina Island during the April 2009 eruption as seen from space. Isla Isabela can also be seen to the east (right).

On 14 February 1825, while anchored in Banks Bay, Captain Benjamin Morrell recorded one of the largest eruptions in Galápagos' history at Fernandina Volcano. His ship escaped to safety and his account of the event was preserved.

The southern flank of the volcano La Cumbre had a fissure eruption that generated flows in April 2009, which subsided within hours. Isla Fernandina supports wildlife that was threatened by the burst of volcanic activity, according to rangers at Galápagos National Park. As the island has no human residents, no settlements were endangered. Park rangers and a passing tourist boat initially observed the volcano at 10:00 p.m. local time on April 10. The sparse population of the western reaches of the Galápagos Islands means that volcanic activity is not always observed or reported as soon as it starts. The seismic station at Puerto Ayora, on the nearby island of Santa Cruz, recorded no earthquakes associated with this eruption.

La Cumbre began erupting again in April 2009. There were fears that lava flowing into the ocean could disrupt and destroy unique flora and fauna of the island, as the flows engulfed much of the island. La Cumbre is the most active volcano of the Galapagos Islands and its peak has an elevation of 1,476 m (4,842 feet). It has experienced several collapses of the caldera floor, often following explosive eruptions.

On 16 June 2018, after a period of heavy seismic activity, La Cumbre erupted. A fissure formed on the north north east flank of the volcano. Lava fountains quickly produced a large lava flow that soon reached the ocean. Gas clouds from the eruption reached 2 to 3 kilometers in height, but did not cause any effects due to the low ash concentration.

The volcano erupted again on 12 January 2020. The volcano began to erupt again on 3 March 2024. Authorities described this eruption as likely bigger than previous ones.
