= Volcán Ecuador =

Dormant shield volcano of the Galapagos Islands

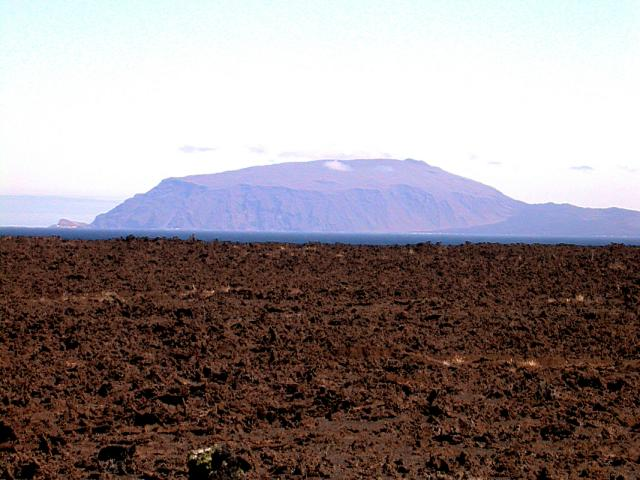

Highest point
- Elevation: 790 m (2,590 ft)
- Prominence: 790 m (2,590 ft)
- Coordinates: 0°01′12″N 91°32′46″W

Geography
- Location within Galápagos Islands
- Location: Isabela Island, Galapagos Islands

Geology
- Mountain type: Shield volcano
- Last eruption: After 1150

Volcán Ecuador (Spanish for 'Ecuador Volcano'), also known as Cape Berkeley Volcano, is the smallest of the six shield volcanoes on Isabela Island, one of the Galápagos Islands, with an elevation of 790 m (2,590 ft). It is situated in the west of the Galapagos, straddling the equator, and is the northwestern most point of Isabela Island.

The volcano contains a caldera that is breached to the west by edifice collapse. The caldera floor is largely covered by youthful lava flows and contains several chains of spatter cones and small scoria cones. It is a dormant volcano which has not erupted for more than 800 years.

== Geography ==
Isabela Island (Spanish: Isla Isabela) is one of the westernmost islands in the Galápagos Islands. Volcán Ecuador is located in the northwest of the island, around 76.5 mi (123.11 km) from Puerto Villamil, the largest settlement on the island. Like Volcán Wolf to the east, Volcán Ecuador straddles the equator. The island forms part of the Galápagos National Park which is a UNESCO World Heritage Site.

== Geology ==
Volcán Ecuador is a shield volcano – a low profile volcano which resembles a shield lying on the ground – and the smallest of the six volcanoes on Isabela Island. It contains a caldera that has been breached by edifice collapse on the west side. The floor of the caldera is largely covered by youthful lava flows and there are spatter cones – a low, steep-sided hill or mound – and small scoria cones – small, steep-sided cones built of loose pyroclastic rock fragments. Cape Berkeley lies on the west of a tuff cone – a small monogenetic cone produced by hydrovolcanic explosions – and is formed of young lava flows extending to the coast.

The geomorphology of its youngest lava flows is comparable to those of very recent lava flows from other volcanoes on Isabela Island.

Little is known of any previous eruptions. Volcán Ecuador is known to have erupted in or after 1150 but has not erupted for more than 800 years.

== See also ==
- List of volcanoes in Ecuador
