= Wolf Island =

Island in the Galápagos Archipelago

Wolf Island (Wenman Island)
- Location within Galápagos Islands

Geography
- Location: Galápagos Islands, Ecuador
- Coordinates: 01°22′57″N 91°48′54″W
- Archipelago: Galápagos Islands

Administration
- Ecuador

Location of Wolf Island in the Pacific Ocean

Wolf Island (Spanish: Isla Wolf) is a small island in the northern Galápagos Islands. It has an area of 1.3 km^{2} (0.5 sq mi) and a maximum altitude of 253 m (830 ft) above sea level. The island is remote from the main archipelago and has no permanent population. The Galápagos National Park does not allow landing on the island; however, it is a popular diving location.

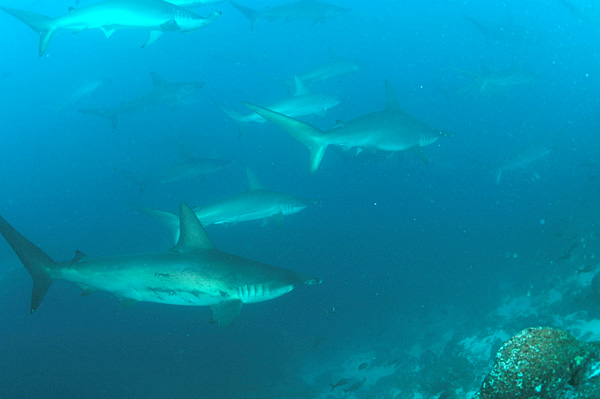
School of scalloped hammerheads, Wolf Island, Galápagos Islands

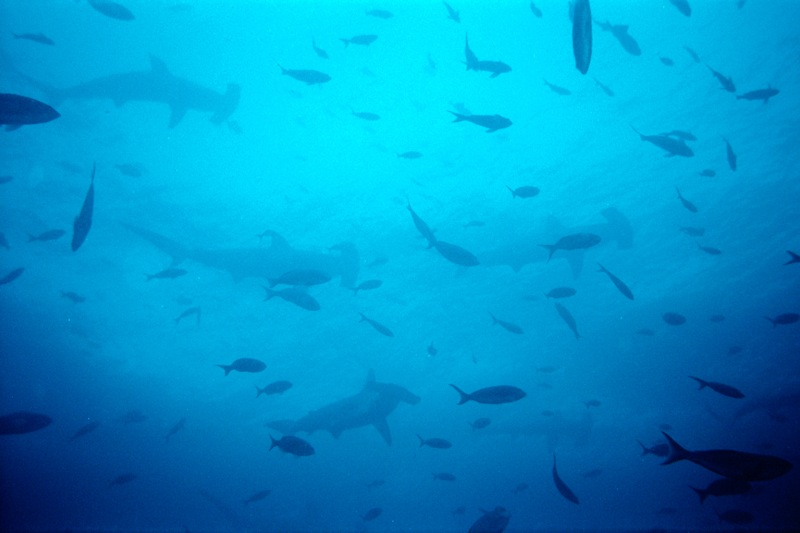
Another school of scalloped hammerheads at Wolf Island, Galápagos

== Names ==
Wolf is named in honor of the German geologist Theodor Wolf ([vɔlf]), who published several important works on the geography and geology of the Galapagos Islands and mainland Ecuador. He is also the namesake of Wolf Volcano on Isabela Island.

In English, the island was previously named Lord Wenman's Island or Wenman Island in honor of Philip Wenman, 3rd Viscount Wenman. The name was bestowed by the English pirate William Ambrosia Cowley in 1684 and used for centuries thereafter.

The group formed by Wolf and nearby Darwin Island is now known as Darwin and Wolf, Darwin–Wolf, or Darwin-Wolf. It was previously known in English as Culpepper and Wenman and in Spanish as Los Hermanos ("The Brothers") or los Dos Hermanos ("the Two Brothers").

== Geology ==
Wolf Island is the remains of an extinct volcano that reaches a maximum 253 m (830 ft) above sea level, it is situated north west of the main Galápagos Island group on the Wolf-Darwin Lineament that extends from the Galápagos Platform to the Galápagos Spreading Center, a mid ocean ridge separating the Nazca and Cocos tectonic plates. Like its near neighbor Darwin Island, Wolf is upstream of the magma plume, in terms of plate movement, that forms the main Galápagos Islands and does not fit in with the formation of those islands. There are currently two theories on the formation of the lineament and therefore Wolf island: the first is that magma rising from the mantle plume forming the main Galápagos Islands has been channelled towards the Galápagos Spreading Center; alternatively there has been a separate rise in magma caused by stress in the ocean lithosphere by a transform fault.

Wolf Island is the southerly island on the lineament. The volcano that formed Wolf Island is now extinct with last eruptions believed to have been 900,000–1,600,000 years ago, meaning the last eruptions occurred before the last eruptions on Darwin Island. The volcanic history of Wolf is complex, with at least two major eruptive phases. The southern area of the island is formed from flat basalt layers from two eruptive phases, the second of which formed a caldera that has now eroded. The lavas formed have been plagioclase ultraphyric basalts with large 4 cm crystals. This chemical makeup is similar to those found in lavas from the northern Galápagos Islands. The extent of the ultraphyric flows make up an unusually large percentage of the volume. There is large variation in the composition of the lavas between eruptive phases, with later flows being depleted.

== Wildlife ==
Wolf Island is part of the Galápagos National Park; however, it is not accessible to land visits. Like its neighbor Darwin, it is open to visits by scuba divers. The marine life of Wolf Island includes: schooling hammerhead, Galápagos and occasionally whale sharks, as well as green turtles, manta rays and other pelagic fish.

Birdlife on the island is abundant with frigatebirds, red-footed boobies, and vampire finches.
