= Darwin Island =

Small island in the Galápagos Islands

Darwin Island (Culpepper Island)
- Location within Galápagos Islands

Geography
- Location: Galápagos Islands, Ecuador
- Coordinates: 1.678°N 92.003°W
- Archipelago: Galápagos Islands

Administration
- Ecuador

Location of Darwin Island in the Pacific Ocean

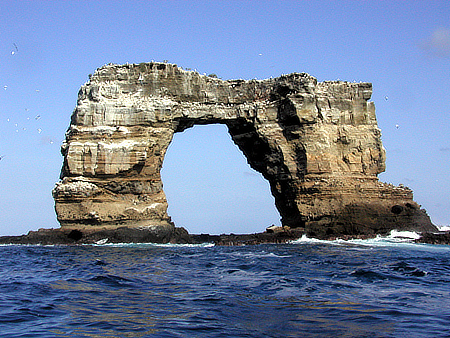
Darwin's Arch prior to it becoming a group of pillars due to erosion

Darwin Island (Spanish: Isla Darwin) is an isolated northern member of the Galápagos Islands in Ecuador, the uppermost extent of an extinct volcano. It has an area of 1 square kilometer (0.4 sq mi) and reaches 165 meters (541 ft) above sea level. Visits to the island are restricted by the Government of Ecuador, but scuba diving is permitted.

== Names ==
Darwin is named in honor of the English scientist Charles Darwin, whose visit to the Galapagos led him to publish his theories on evolution in On the Origin of Species and other works. He is also the namesake of Great Darwin Bay on Genovesa Island. Darwin Island was previously named Lord Culpeper's Island, Culpepper's Island, and Culpepper Island in honor of Thomas Colepeper, 2nd Baron Colepeper. The name was bestowed by the pirate William Ambrosia Cowley in 1684 and continued in use for centuries thereafter.

The group formed by Darwin and nearby Wolf Island is now known as Darwin and Wolf, Darwin–Wolf, or Darwin-Wolf. It was previously known in English as Culpepper and Wenman and in Spanish as Los Hermanos ("The Brothers") or los Dos Hermanos ("the Two Brothers").

== Geology ==
Darwin Island is the remains of an extinct volcano that reaches 165 meters (541 ft) above sea level. It is among the smallest in the Galápagos Archipelago with an area of just one square kilometre (0.4 sq mi). It is situated north-west of the main Galápagos Island group on the Wolf-Darwin Lineament, which extends from the Galápagos Platform to the Galápagos spreading center, a mid-ocean ridge separating the Nazca and Cocos tectonic plates. The formation of Darwin Island is different from the formation of the main Galápagos Islands. There are currently two theories on the formation of the lineament: the first is that magma rising from the mantle plume forming the main Galápagos Islands has been channelled towards the Galápagos spreading center; alternatively there has been a separate rise in magma caused by stress in the ocean lithosphere by a transform fault.

Darwin Island is the most northerly of the two peaks on the Wolf Darwin Lineament that reach above the surface. The other, Wolf Island, is approximately 40 km (25 mi) away, although there are other sub-surface peaks. The volcano that forms the island is extinct, with the last eruption believed to have been approximately 400,000 years ago, making it younger than Wolf. The lava flows around Darwin are homogenous, apparently because of its young age, and they have a similar chemical composition to those of the Galápagos spreading center.

Darwin is believed to have had at least two eruptive periods in its history, depositing two tuff layers separated by plagioclase ultraphyric basalt. Evidence also exists to suggest that Darwin Island is the remains of what was once a much larger edifice. Since the eruptive phase this would have been eroded.

Darwin's Arch, a natural rock arch which would at one time have been part of this larger structure, was located less than a kilometer from the main Darwin Island, and it was a landmark well known to the island's few visitors, until its collapse in May 2021.

== Wildlife ==
Darwin Island is not open to land visits. With no dry landing sites, Darwin Island's main attractions are found in the Pacific Ocean, which is teeming with a large variety of marine life. The only visitors are those that come to scuba dive, even here due to the distance from the main island only a limited number of liveaboard ships cruise here.

The marine life at Darwin is diverse with large schools of fish. The island's waters attract whale sharks from June to November, as well as hammerhead, Galápagos, silky and blacktip sharks. In addition green turtles, manta rays and dolphins can be found.

The island also supports a large bird population, including frigatebirds, red-footed boobies and the vampire finch.

== History ==
Although the island had been marked on maps, the first known landing on Darwin did not occur until 1964, when it was visited by helicopter.
