= Fernandina Island =

Island in the Galapagos

Fernandina Island (Narborough Island)
- Location within Galápagos Islands

Geography
- Location: Galápagos Islands, Ecuador
- Coordinates: 0°22′S 91°33′W
- Archipelago: Galápagos Islands
- Area: 642 km^{2} (248 sq mi)
- Highest elevation: 1,476 m (4843 ft)
- Highest point: Volcan La Cumbre

Administration
- Ecuador
- Province: Galápagos

Fernandina
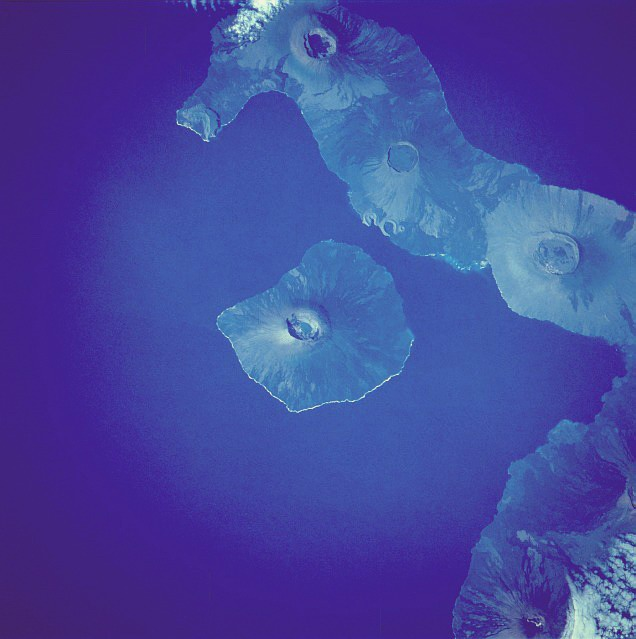
- Fernandina Island (centre) and Isabela Island

Highest point
- Peak: Volcan La Cumbre
- Elevation: 1,476 m (4,843 ft)
- Coordinates: 0°22′S 91°33′W

Geography
- Location within Galápagos Islands
- Location: Galápagos Islands, Ecuador

Geology
- Mountain type: Shield volcano
- Last eruption: 2024

Fernandina Island (Spanish: Isla Fernandina) is the youngest and third largest island in the Galápagos, as well as the furthest west. It has an area of 642 km^{2} (248 sq mi) and a height of 1,476 m (4,843 ft), with a summit caldera about 6.5 km (4.0 mi) wide. It is younger than Isabela, being only less than one million years old since its formation. Like the other islands, it was formed by the Galápagos hotspot. The island is an active shield volcano that has most recently erupted in March 2024.

== Names ==
Fernandina is named in honor of King Ferdinand II of Aragon, one of the sponsors of Christopher Columbus's voyages. It was formerly known in Spanish as Isla de Plata ("Silver Island") and in English as Narbrough or Narborough Island, honoring Admiral John Narborough who commanded a British Navy squadron in the West Indies. The name was bestowed by the English pirate William Ambrosia Cowley in 1684 and preserved for centuries thereafter.

== Geography ==
Fernandina is the youngest and third largest island in the Galápagos, as well as the furthest west. It has an area of 642 km^{2} (248 sq mi) and a height of 1,476 m (4,843 ft), with a summit caldera about 6.5 km (4.0 mi) wide. The caldera underwent a collapse in 1968, when parts of the caldera floor dropped 350 m (1,150 ft). A small lake has intermittently occupied the northern caldera floor, most recently in 1988. Due to the recent volcanic activity, the island does not present much plant life and has a mostly rocky surface. Visitors to Fernandina Island will be taken to see only the outskirts of the crater for safety reasons. Two types of lava flow can be observed, ʻaʻā and pāhoehoe.

== Wildlife ==
Punta Espinoza is a narrow stretch of land where hundreds of marine iguanas gather in large groups on black lava rocks. The famous flightless cormorant inhabits this island as well as penguins, pelicans and sea lions. The Narborough Island tortoise is a highly elusive subspecies of Galápagos tortoise restricted to the island, thought likely extinct when no sighting had been made for 113 years after 1906, one old female being found in 2019.

== Flora ==
Mangrove forests are also found on the island.

== Volcanic history ==
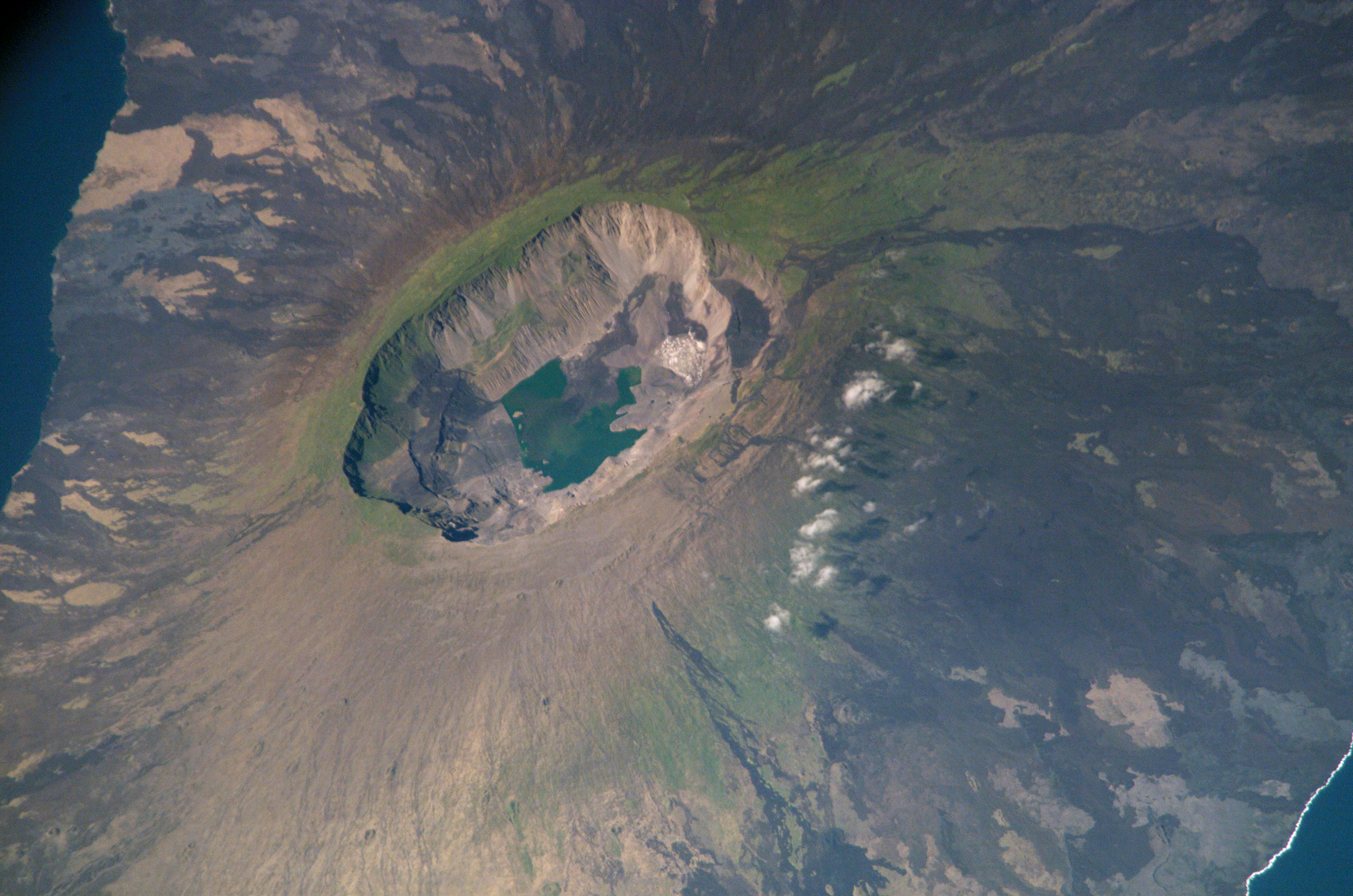
La Cumbre volcano, viewed from the ISS, July 2002

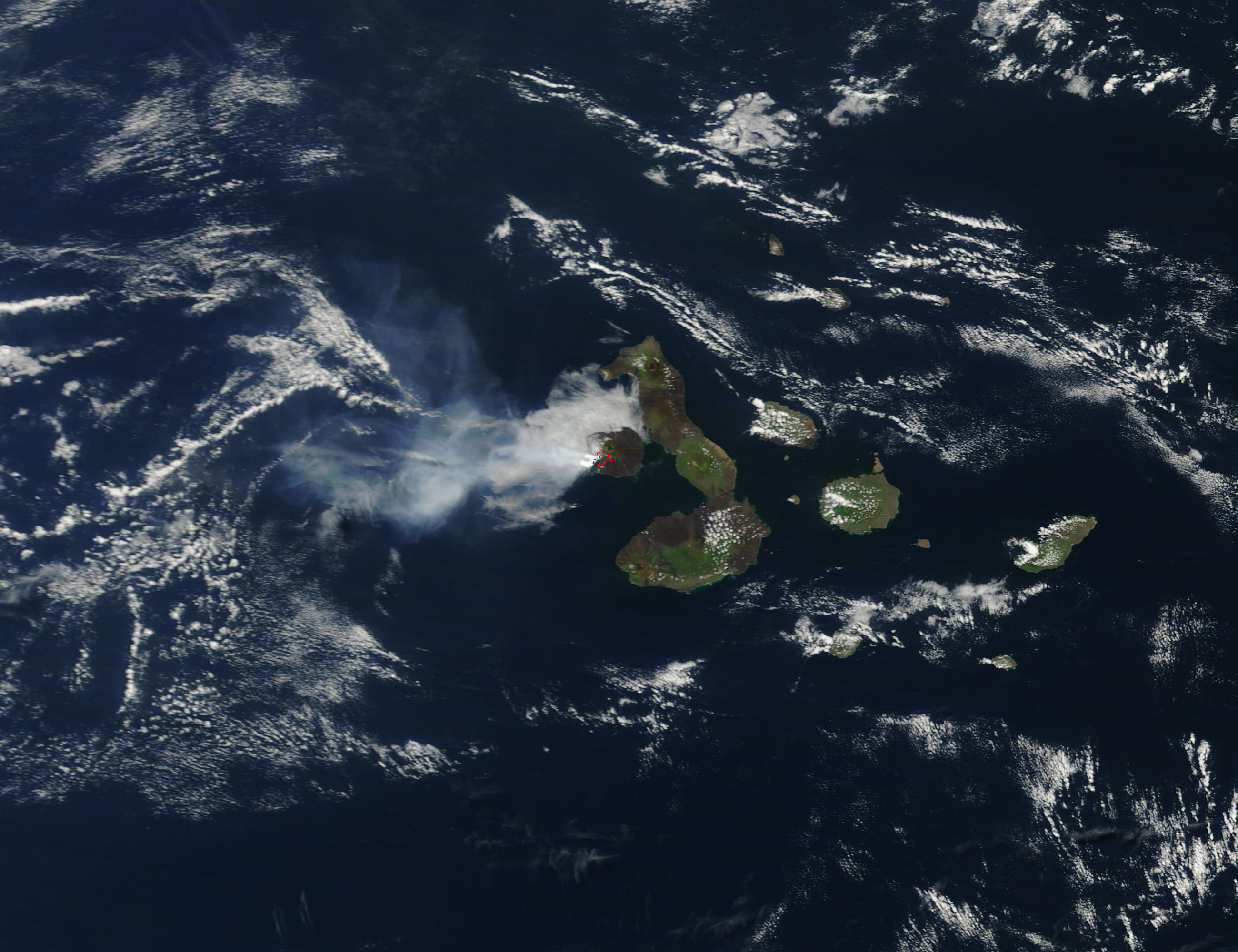
Fernandina Island during the April 2009 eruption as seen from space. Isla Isabela can also be seen to the east (right).

Eruptions of La Cumbre have been recorded in 1825, 2009, 2018, 2020 and 2024. It is one of the most active volcanoes in the Galápagos chain.

=== 2026 activity ===
On January 8, 2026 the Galapagos National Park reported that seismic activity has increased over the past week. Scientists are unsure if this will lead to an eruption, but note that it isn't out of the question that a near term eruption might take place.

== See also ==
- Volcanoes of the Galápagos Islands
- List of volcanoes in Ecuador
