= Isabela Island (Galápagos) =

Largest Island in the Galápagos Archipelago

Isabela Island (Albemarle Island)
Native name: Isabela
- Map of Galápagos Islands

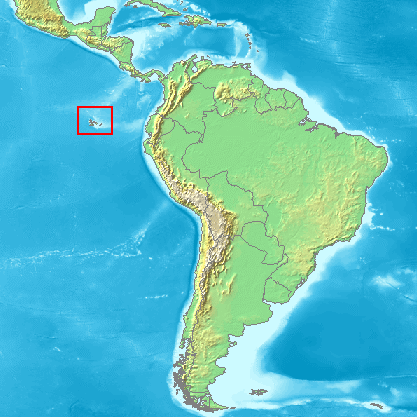

Geography
- Location: Pacific Ocean
- Coordinates: 00°30′S 91°04′W
- Archipelago: Galápagos Islands
- Area: 4,586 km^{2} (1,771 sq mi)
- Length: 100 km (60 mi)
- Highest elevation: 1,707 m (5600 ft)
- Highest point: Volcán Wolf

Administration
- Ecuador
- Province: Galápagos Province

Demographics
- Population: 1,748
- Pop. density: 0.47/km^{2} (1.22/sq mi)
- Ethnic groups: Ecuadorians

Isabela Island (Spanish: Isla Isabela) is the largest of the Galápagos Islands, with an area of 4,586 km^{2} (1,771 sq mi) and a length of 100 km (62 mi). By itself, it is larger than all the other islands in the chain combined, and it has a little under 2,000 permanent inhabitants. The island straddles the equator.

== Names ==
The original Spanish name of Isabela ([isaˈβela]) was Santa Isabela Island (Isla Santa Isabela or Ysla Santa Ysabel) in honor of the Aragonese Queen Elizabeth of Portugal, who was canonized by Pope Urban VIII on 24 June 1626. When the name was formally changed to Isabela Island in 1892 as part of Ecuador's quadricentennial celebration of Columbus's first voyage, its eponym changed to Columbus's patron Queen Isabella I of Castile. Isabela and nearby Fernandina Island—honoring Isabella's husband Ferdinand II of Aragon—also preserve the names bestowed on the third and fourth islands encountered by Columbus during his voyage.

The former English name Duke of Albemarl's Island or Albemarle Island was bestowed by English buccaneer Ambrose Cowley in 1684 in honor of Christopher Monck, 2nd Duke of Albemarle.

== Geography ==
Isabela Island is the largest of the Galápagos Islands, with an area of 4,586 km^{2} (1,771 sq mi) and a length of 100 km (62 mi). Almost four times larger than Santa Cruz, the second largest of the archipelago, Isabela is larger than every other island in the Galápagos combined.

== Geology ==
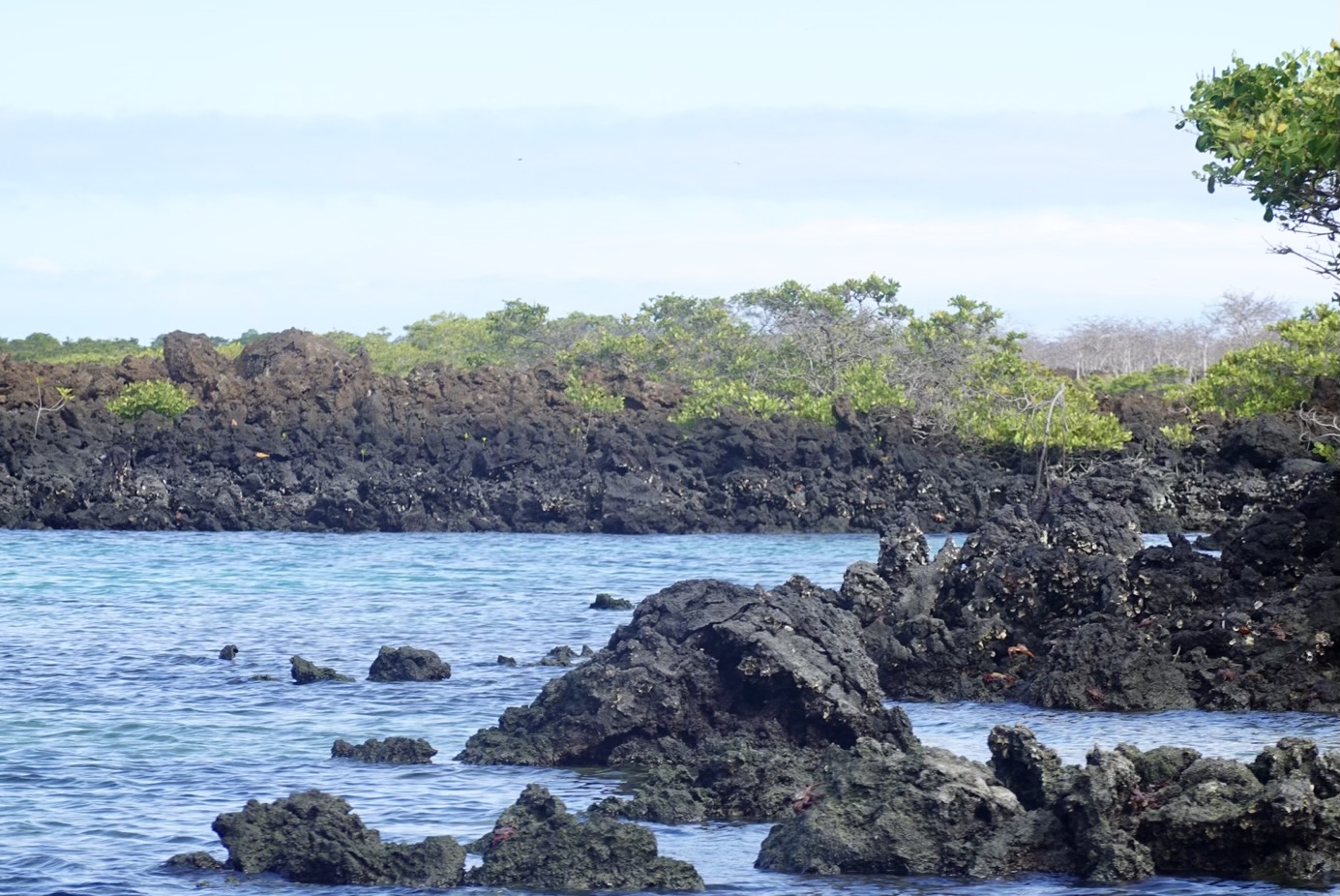
Volcanic rocks of the island in Elizabeth Bay

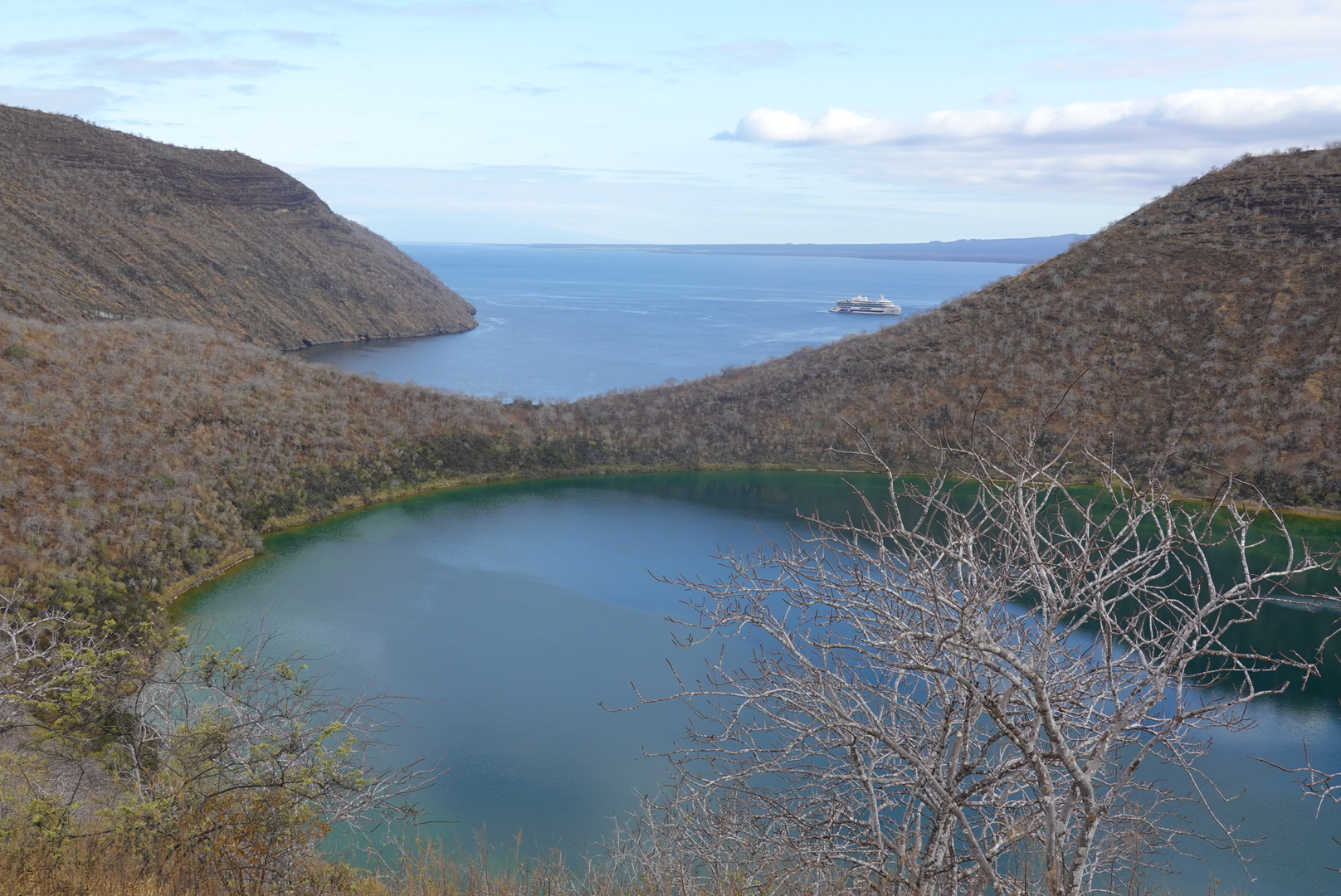
Darwin Lake near Tagus Cove

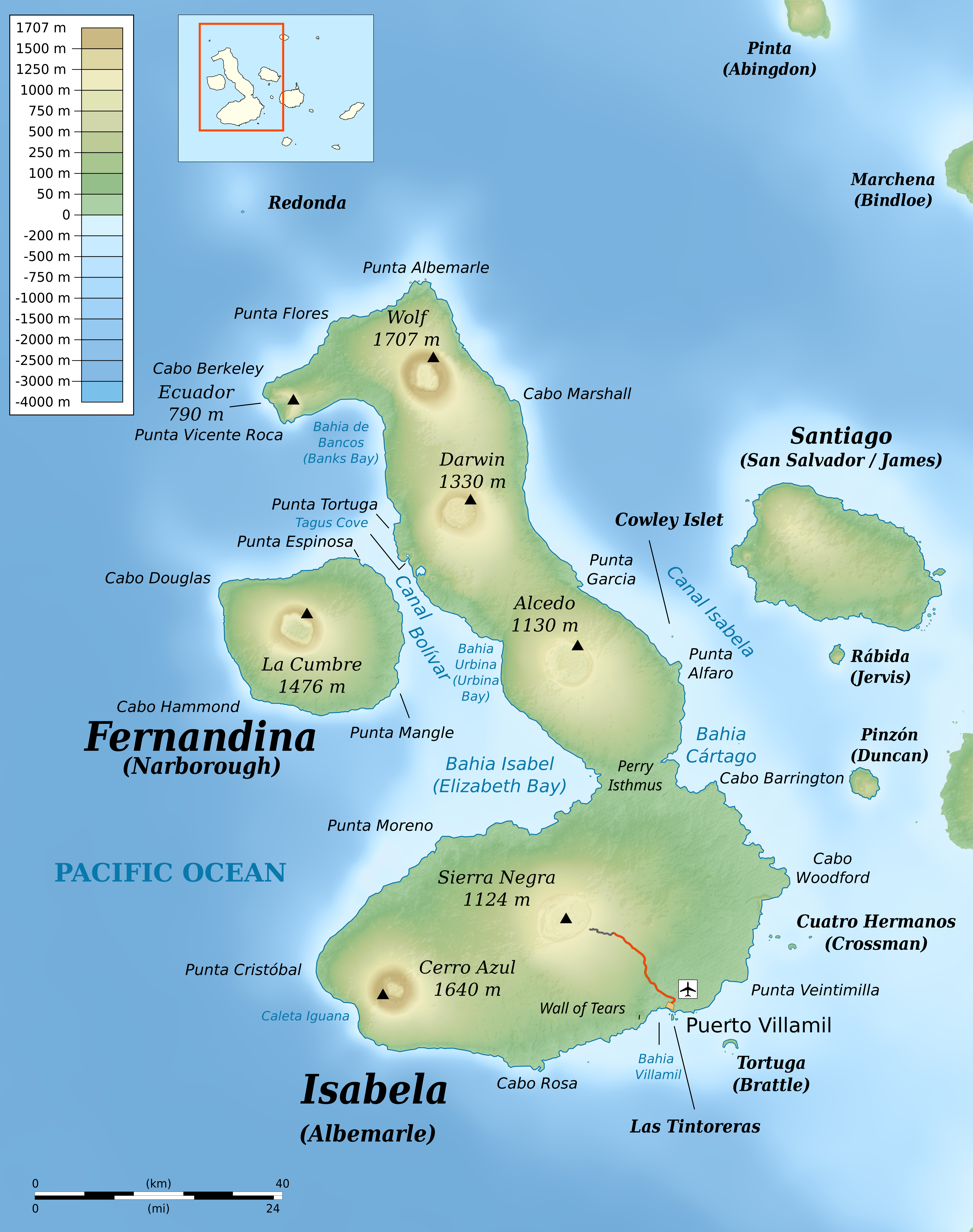
Topographic map

One of the youngest islands, Isabela is located on the western edge of the archipelago near the Galápagos hotspot. At approximately 1 million years old, the seahorse-shaped island was formed by the merger of six shield volcanoes; Alcedo, Cerro Azul, Darwin, Ecuador, Sierra Negra, and Wolf. All of these volcanoes except Ecuador are still active, making it one of the most volcanically active places on earth. Two of the volcanoes, Volcan Ecuador and Volcan Wolf (the island's highest point with an elevation of 1,707 m [5,600 ft]), lie directly on the equator. The island is primarily noted for its geology, providing excellent examples of a geologic occurrence that created the Galápagos Islands including uplifts at Urbina Bay and the Bolivar Channel, tuff cones at Tagus Cove, and Pulmace on Alcedo and Sierra Negra, one of the most active volcanoes in the world.

== Wildlife ==
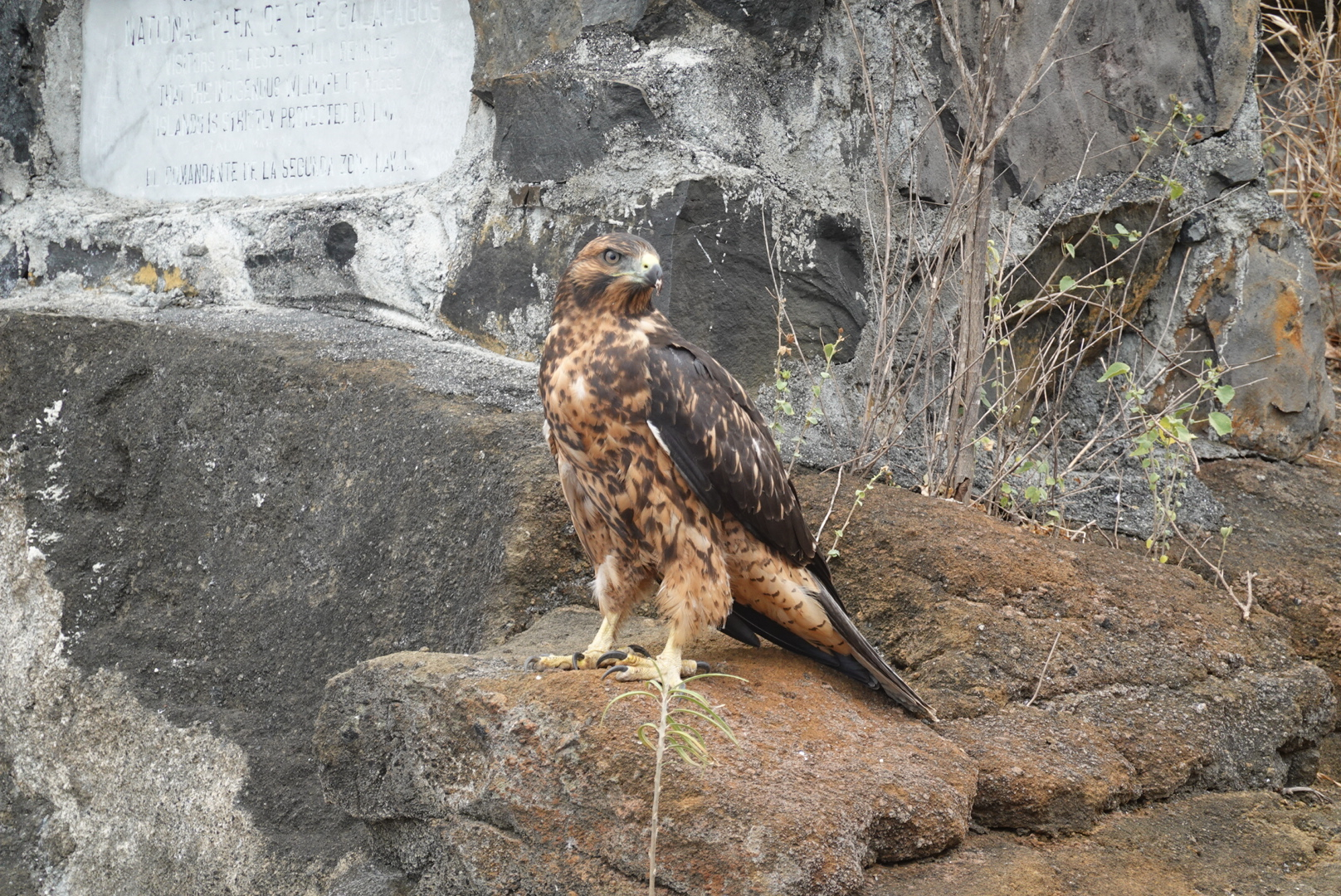
Galápagos Hawk on Isabela Island

Isabela is also interesting for its flora and fauna. The young island does not follow the vegetation zones of the other islands. The relatively new lava fields and surrounding soils have not developed the sufficient nutrients required to support the varied life zones found on other islands. Another obvious difference occurs on Volcan Wolf and Cerro Azul; these volcanoes loft above the cloud cover and are arid on top.

Isabela's rich bird, animal and marine life is beyond compare. Isabela is home to more wild tortoises than all the other islands. Isabela's large size and notable topography created barriers for the slow-moving tortoises; apparently the creatures were unable to cross lava flows and other obstacles, causing several different sub-species of tortoise to develop. Today, tortoises roam free in the calderas of Alcedo, Wolf, Cerro Azul, Darwin, and Sierra Negra.

Introduced goats multiplied to over 100,000, but were eradicated by the Galápagos National Park Service and the Charles Darwin Foundation in 2006-2007. Since then, the vegetation has recovered greatly.

Other noted species include penguins, cormorants, marine iguanas, boobies, pelicans, Sally Lightfoot crabs, Galápagos land iguanas, Darwin's finches, Galápagos hawks, Galápagos doves, and lowland vegetation. It is possible to view whales and dolphins from the west coast of Isabela in the Bolivar Channel in Galápagos.

== History ==
The settlements of Puerto Villamil and Santo Tomás were founded in 1893. By 1905, the population of the island was 200. Exports at the time were sulfur mined from fumaroles and lime made from coral. Tortoises were used for meat and oil. Puerto Villamil, the third-largest settlement of the archipelago, is located at the southeastern tip of the island.

== Attractions ==
The island's attractions include the Wall of Tears (el Muro de las Lágrimas), built by prisoners when the island was a penal colony, and the Flamingo Lagoon, named for the flamingos found there. Both are on the south of the island.

== See also ==
- List of volcanoes in Ecuador
- Volcanoes of the Galápagos Islands
