= Guy Fawkes (disambiguation) =

Guy Fawkes (1570–1606) was a conspirator in the Gunpowder Plot.

Guy Fawkes may also refer to:

- Guy Fawkes (novel), a novel by William Harrison Ainsworth
- Guy Fawkes (film), a 1923 British silent historical film
- Isla Guy Fawkes, an island of the Galapagos Islands
- Guy Fawkes River, a river in New South Wales, Australia
  - Guy Fawkes River National Park

== See also ==
- Bridgwater Guy Fawkes Carnival, an annual festival
- Guy Fawkes mask
- Guy Fawkes Night, an annual celebration of the foiling of the plot, on November 5
- Guido Fawkes, a political blog
