= Galápagos Islands =

Ecuadorian volcanic archipelago

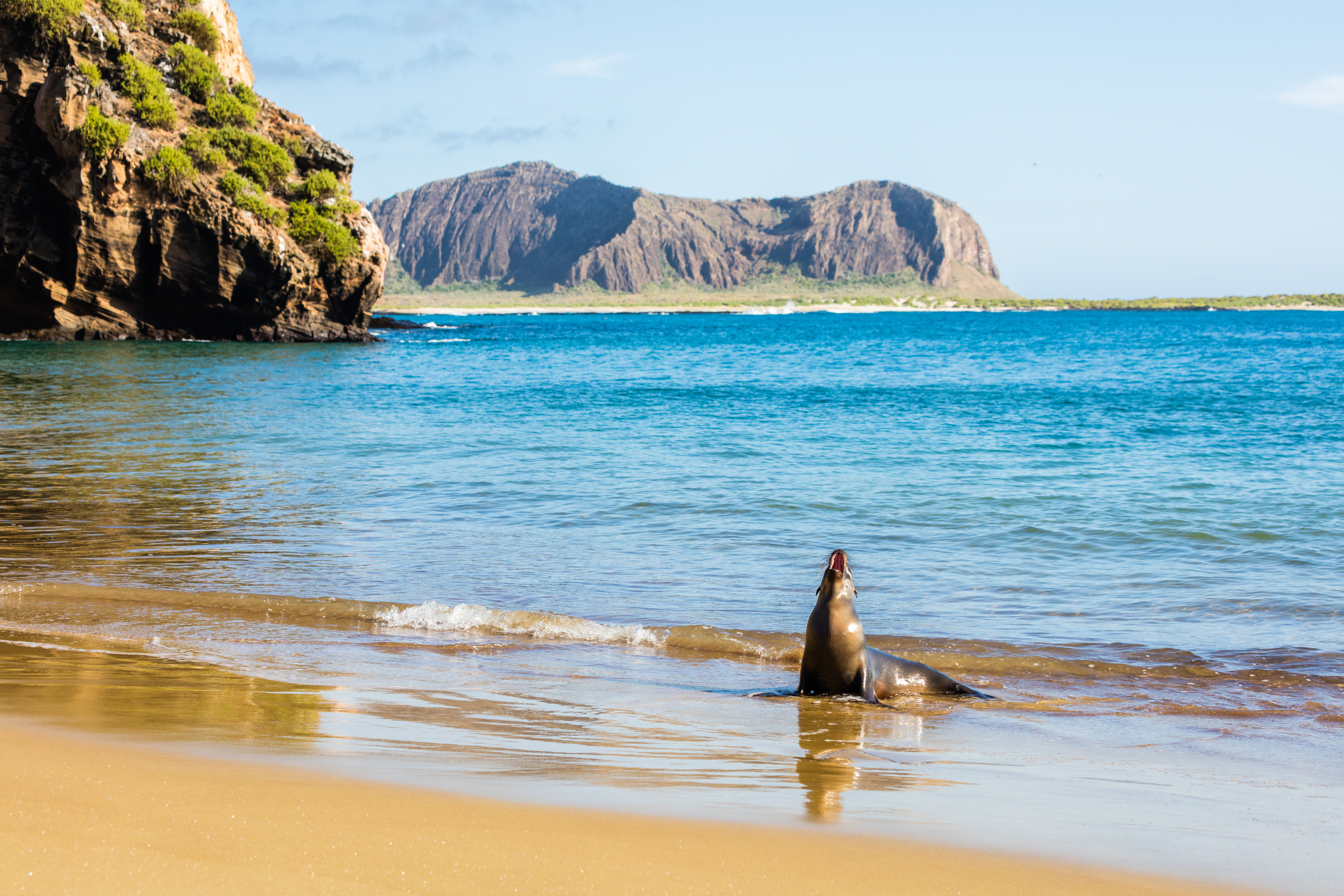
- Galapagos sea lion on San Cristóbal Island

Geography
- Location: Pacific Ocean
- Coordinates: 0°30′S 90°30′W
- Total islands: 127
- Major islands: 19
- Area: 8,010 (Note: The Galapagos are 7,880 square kilometers in land area.) km^{2} (3,090 sq mi)
- Highest elevation: 1,707 m (5600 ft)
- Highest point: Volcán Wolf

Administration
- Ecuador
- Province: Galápagos
- Capital city: Puerto Baquerizo Moreno

Demographics
- Population: 33,042 (2020)
- Pop. density: 3/km^{2} (8/sq mi)

Additional information
- Time zone: GALT (UTC-6)

UNESCO World Heritage Site
- Official name: Galápagos Islands
- Type: Natural
- Criteria: vii, viii, ix, x
- Designated: 1978 (2nd session)
- Reference no.: 1
- Region: South America
- Extension: 2001 and 2003
- Endangered: 2007–2010

Location of the Galápagos Islands relative to continental Ecuador

The Galápagos Islands (Note: /ɡəˈlæpəɡəs/ in British English, /ɡəˈlɑpəˌɡoʊs/ in American English) (Spanish: Islas Galápagos) are an archipelago of volcanic islands in the Eastern Pacific, located around the equator, 485 nautical miles (898 km; 558 mi) west of the mainland of South America. They form the Galápagos Province of the Republic of Ecuador, with a population of slightly over 33,450 in 2020. The province is divided into the cantons of San Cristóbal, Santa Cruz, and Isabela, the three most populated islands in the chain. The Galápagos are famous for their large number of endemic species, which were studied by Charles Darwin in the 1830s and inspired his theory of evolution by means of natural selection. All of these islands are protected as part of Ecuador's Galápagos National Park and Marine Reserve.

There is no firm evidence that Polynesians or the Indigenous peoples of South America reached the islands before their accidental discovery by Bishop Tomás de Berlanga in 1535. If some visitors did arrive, poor access to fresh water on the islands seems to have limited settlement. The Spanish Empire similarly ignored the islands, although during the Golden Age of Piracy, various pirates used the Galápagos as a base to raid Spanish shipping along the Peruvian coast. The goats and black and brown rats introduced during this period greatly damaged the existing ecosystems of several islands. British sailors were chiefly responsible for exploring and mapping the area. Darwin's voyage on HMS Beagle was part of an extensive British survey of the coasts of South America. Ecuador, which won its independence from Spain in 1822 and left Gran Colombia in 1830, formally occupied and claimed the islands on 12 February 1832 while the voyage was ongoing. José de Villamil, the founder of the Ecuadorian Navy, led the push to colonize and settle the islands, gradually supplanting the English names of the major islands with Spanish ones. The United States built the islands' first airport as a base to protect the western approaches of the Panama Canal in the 1930s. After World War II, its facilities were transferred to Ecuador. With the growing importance of ecotourism to the local economy, the airport modernized in the 2010s, using recycled materials for any expansion and shifting entirely to renewable energy sources to handle its roughly 300,000 visitors each year.

== Etymology ==
The Galápagos Islands take their name from their native giant tortoises, known in Spanish as "galápagos" (derived from a pre-Roman Iberian word meaning 'turtle' or 'tortoise'). The name is first attested as the Spanish/Latin hybrid Insulae de los Galopegos ('Islands of the Turtles') on the map of the Americas in Abraham Ortelius's Theater of the Lands of the World (Latin: Theatrum Orbis Terrarum), first published in 1570. Early sailors to the islands also dubbed them the "Enchanted Isles" due to the difficulty in navigating the winds and currents around them.

The islands have also been known by other names. They were officially named the Ecuador Archipelago (Archipiélago de Ecuador) or Archipelago of the Equator (Archipiélago del Ecuador) following their annexation by Ecuador in 1832. In 1892, upon the quadricentennial of Christopher Columbus's first voyage they were renamed the Colón or Columbus Archipelago (Archipiélago del Colón). This remains their official title in Ecuadorian maps and state documents.

The islands were mapped by the English buccaneer Ambrose Cowley in 1684 and the British naval officer Captain James Colnett in 1793. Both men named the archipelago's islands after British monarchs, noblemen, and Royal Navy officers. Over time, the English names were gradually replaced by Spanish names after Ecuador annexed the islands in 1832, but the English names remain in use in older sources.

== Geology ==
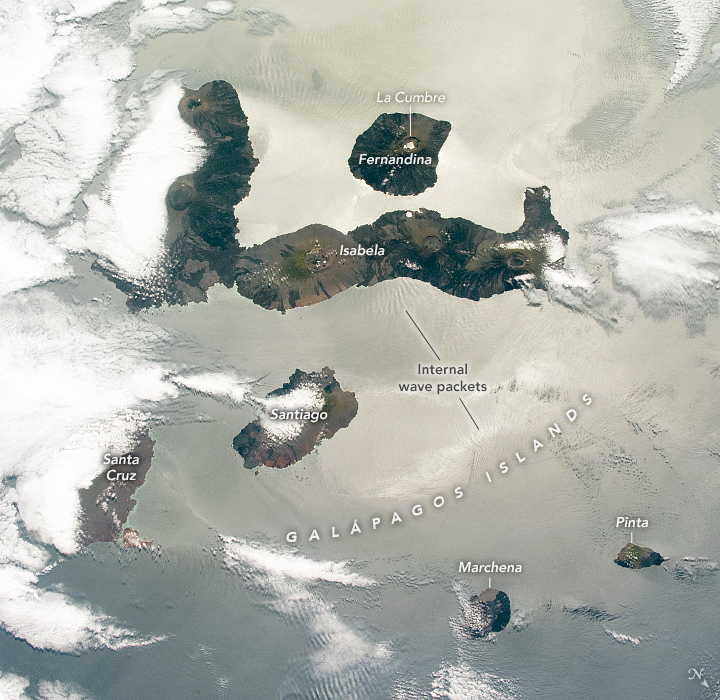
A photograph of the Galápagos Islands from the International Space Station in October 2020. North is to the right. The sunglint reveals features usually difficult to spot, including the crater lake in the caldera of La Cumbre, the shield volcano that formed Fernandina Island. More details via click-through.

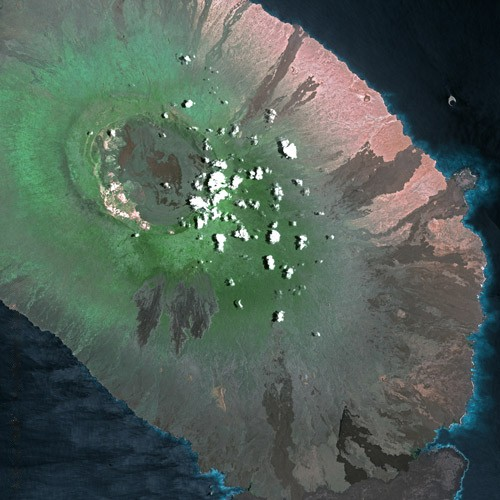
Isabela seen from the Spot Satellite

The Galápagos islands are located at the Galápagos triple junction. The archipelago is located on the Nazca plate (a tectonic plate), which is moving east/southeast, diving under the South American plate at a rate of about 2.5 inches (6.4 cm) per year. It is also atop the Galápagos hotspot, a place where the Earth's crust is being melted from below by a mantle plume, creating volcanoes. The first islands formed here at least 8 million and possibly up to 90 million years ago.

Volcanism has been continuous on the Galápagos Islands for at least 20 million years, and perhaps even longer. The mantle plume beneath the eastward-moving Nazca plate (51 km/Myr) has given rise to a 3-kilometre-thick platform under the island chain and seamounts. Besides the Galápagos Archipelago, other key tectonic features in the region include the Northern Galápagos volcanic province between the archipelago and the Galápagos spreading center (GSC) 200 km (120 mi) to the north at the boundary of the Nazca plate and the Cocos plate. This spreading center terminates at the East Pacific Rise to the west and is bounded by the Cocos Ridge and the Carnegie Ridge to the east. Furthermore, the Galápagos Hotspot is at the northern boundary of the Pacific Large Low Shear Velocity Province while the Easter Hotspot is on the southern boundary.

The Galápagos Archipelago is characterized by numerous contemporaneous volcanoes, some with plume magma sources, others from the asthenosphere, possibly due to the young and thin oceanic crust. The GSC caused structural weaknesses in this thin lithosphere leading to eruptions forming the Galápagos Platform. Fernandina and Isabela in particular are aligned along these weaknesses. Lacking a well-defined rift zone, the islands have a high rate of inflation prior to eruption. Sierra Negra on Isabela Island experienced a 240 cm (94 in) uplift between 1992 and 1998, most recent eruption in 2005, while Fernandina on Fernandina Island indicated an uplift of 90 cm (35 in), most recent eruption in 2009. Alcedo on Isabela Island had an uplift of greater than 90 cm, most recent eruption in 1993. While the older islands have disappeared below the sea as they moved away from the mantle plume, the youngest islands, Isabela and Fernandina, are still being formed. Additional characteristics of the Galápagos Archipelago are closer volcano spacing, smaller volcano sizes, and larger calderas. For instance, Isabela Island includes six major volcanoes, Ecuador, Wolf, Darwin, Alcedo, Sierra Negra and Cerro Azul, with most recent eruptions ranging from 1813 to 2018. The neighboring islands of Santiago and Fernandina last erupted in 1906 and 2009, respectively. Overall, the nine active volcanoes in the archipelago have erupted 24 times between 1961 and 2011. The shape of these volcanoes is tall and rounded as opposed to wide and smooth in the Hawaiian Islands. The Galápagos's shape is due to the pattern of radial and circumferential fissure, radial on the flanks, but circumferential near the caldera summits. It is the circumferential fissures which give rise to stacks of short lava flows.

The volcanoes at the west end of the archipelago are in general, taller, younger, have well-developed calderas, and are mostly composed of tholeiitic basalt, while those on the east are shorter, older, lack calderas, and have a more diverse composition. The ages of the islands, from west to east are 0.05 Ma for Fernandina, 0.65 Ma for Isabela, 1.10 Ma for Santiago, 1.7 Ma for Santa Cruz, 2.90 Ma for Santa Fe, and 3.2 Ma for San Cristobal. The calderas on Sierra Negra and Alcedo have active fault systems. The Sierra Negra fault is associated with a sill 2 km (1.2 mi) below the caldera. The caldera on Fernandina experienced the largest basaltic volcano collapse in history, with the 1968 phreatomagmatic eruption. Fernandina has also been the most active volcano since 1790, with recent eruptions in 1991, 1995, 2005, and 2009, and the entire surface has been covered in numerous flows since 4.3 Ka. The western volcanoes have numerous tuff cones. In late June 2018, Sierra Negra, one of five volcanoes on Isabela and one of the most active in the Galapagos archipelago, began erupting for the first time since 2005. Lava flows made their way to the coastline, prompting the evacuation of about fifty nearby residents and restricting tourist access.

== Physical geography ==
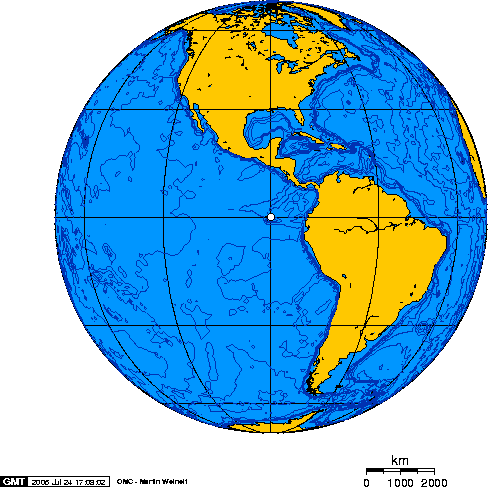
Orthographic projection centered over the Galápagos

The Galápagos Islands have a land area of about 8,000 square kilometers (3,100 sq mi) spread over 45,000 square kilometers (17,000 sq mi) of ocean. The archipelago is composed of 127 islands, islets, and rocks, of which 19 are large islands with an area exceeding 1 square kilometer (0.39 sq mi). The largest island by far is Isabela. Its area of 4,588 square kilometers (1,771 sq mi) makes up close to three-fifths of the Galápagos's total area. The islands of Santa Cruz (986 square kilometers (381 sq mi)) and Fernandina (642 square kilometers (248 sq mi)) follow. The highest point in the islands is Volcán Wolf on Isabela, reaching an altitude of 1,700 meters (5,600 ft). While broad shield volcanoes are found in the western islands of Isabela and Fernandina, smaller, more significantly eroded landforms are found in the eastern islands.

The islands are found at the coordinates 1°40'N–1°36'S, 89°16'–92°01'W. They are located in the eastern Pacific Ocean, around 1,000 km (620 mi) to the west of mainland Ecuador, the country to which they belong. Straddling the equator, islands in the chain are located in both the Northern and Southern hemispheres, with Volcán Wolf and Volcán Ecuador on Isabela being directly on the equator. Española Island, the southernmost island of the archipelago, and Darwin Island, the northernmost one, are spread out over a distance of 220 km (140 mi). Although bisected by the equator, the archipelago is considered to be wholly within the South Pacific Ocean by the International Hydrographic Organization. The surrounding Galápagos Marine Reserve encompasses 133,000 square kilometers (51,000 sq mi) of ocean within 40 nautical miles of the archipelago. The local marine environment is shaped by the convergence of several major ocean currents, including the cool Humboldt Current from the south, the warm Panama Current from the north, and the deep, nutrient-rich Cromwell Current upwelling from the west.

=== Main islands ===
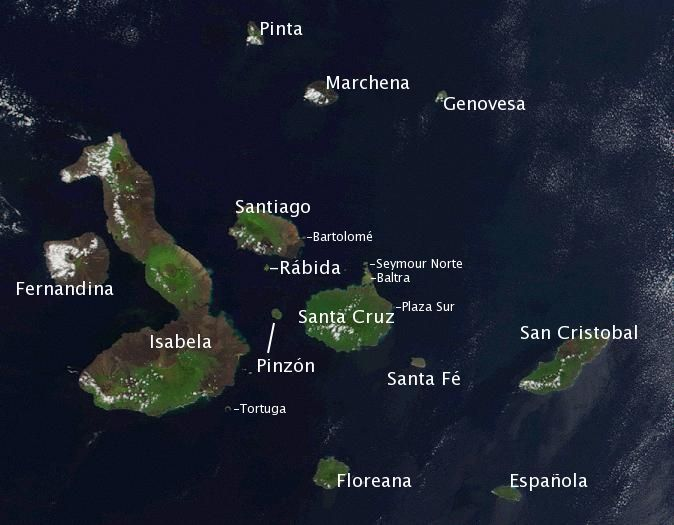
Satellite photo of the Galápagos islands overlaid with the names of the islands

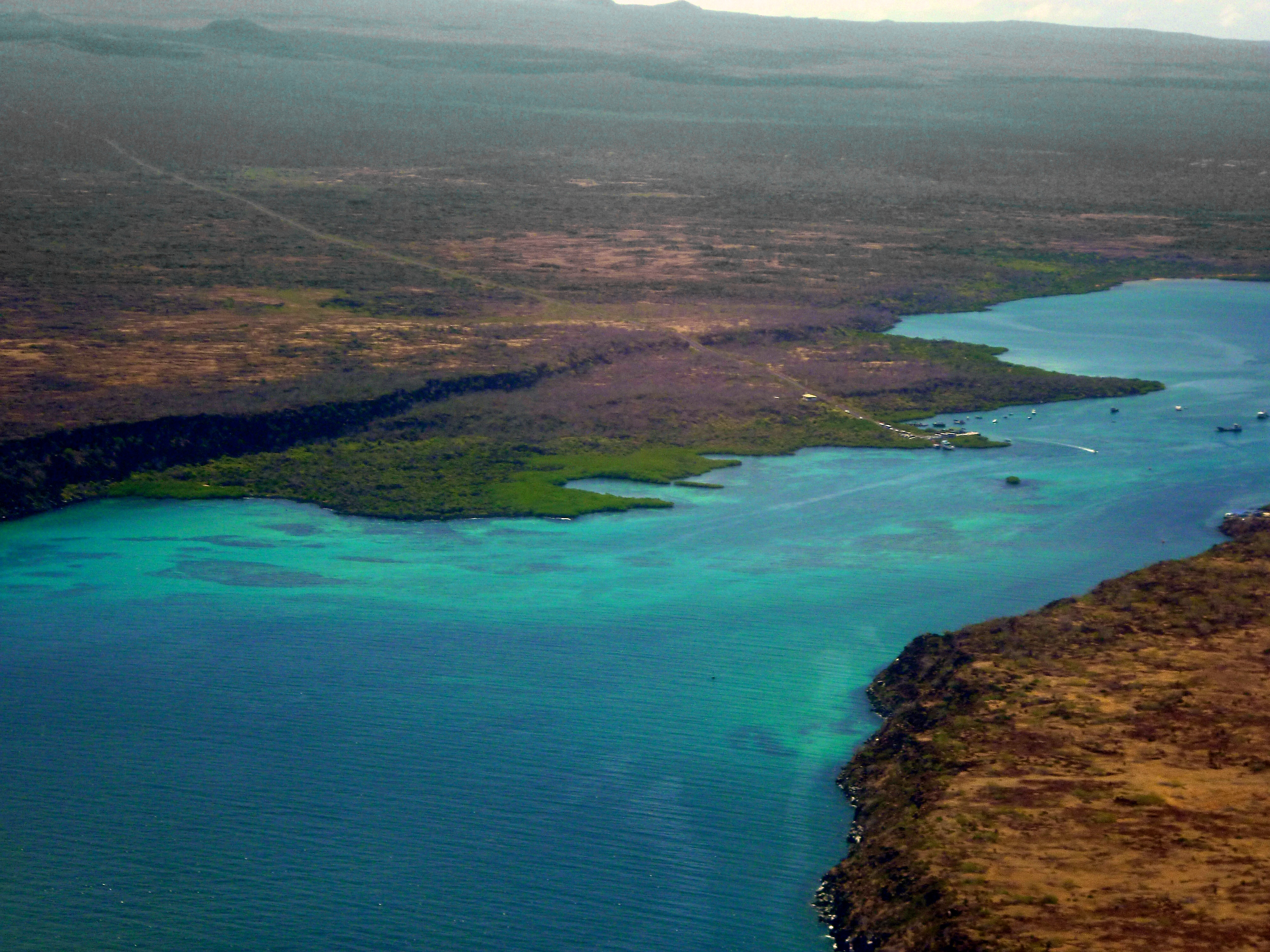
From an aircraft flying out of Baltra Island (on the right) and the Santa Cruz (on the left), the Itabaca Channel is the waterway between the islands.

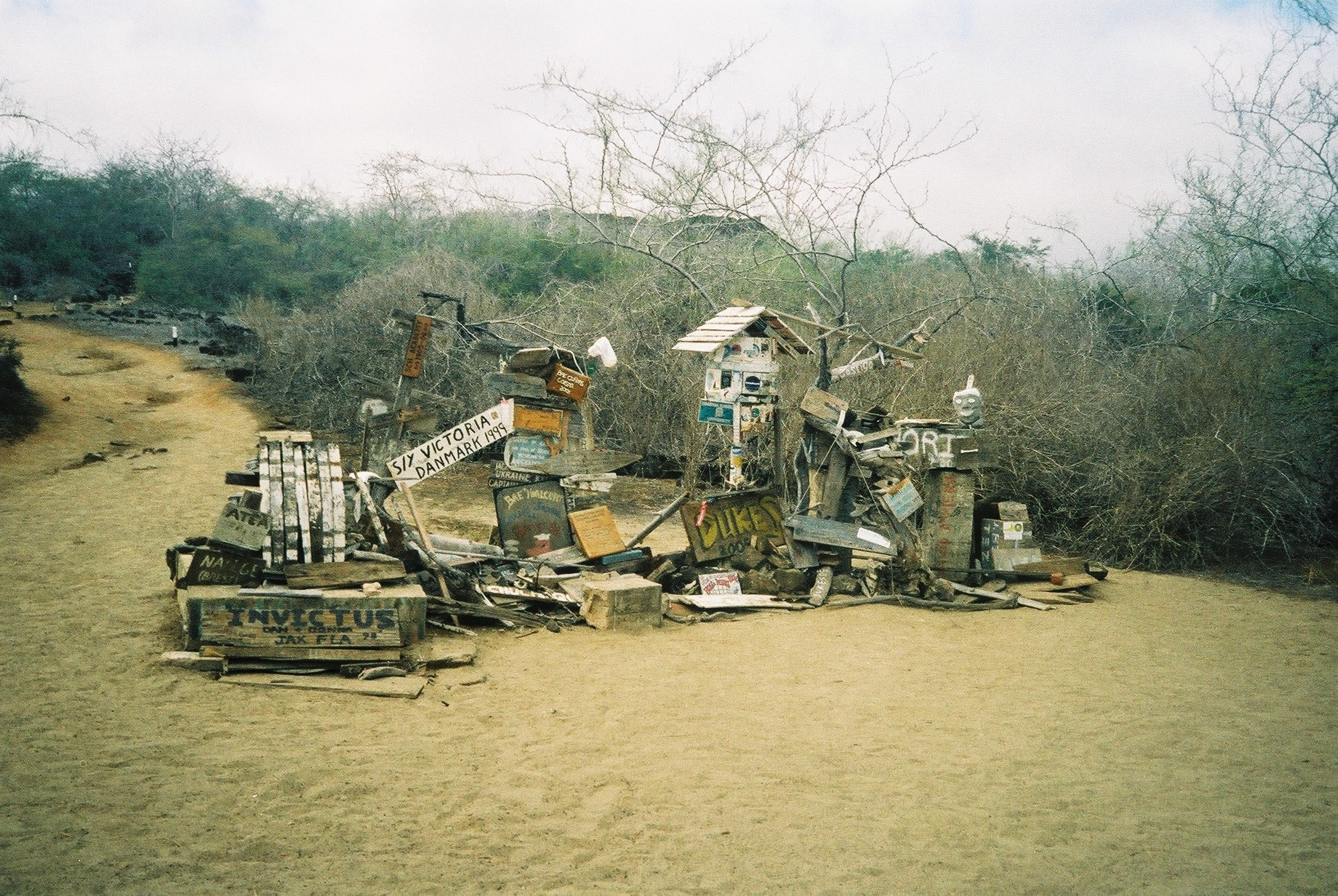
The Post Barrel on Floreana Island, formerly used by sailors to pass messages to any passing ships

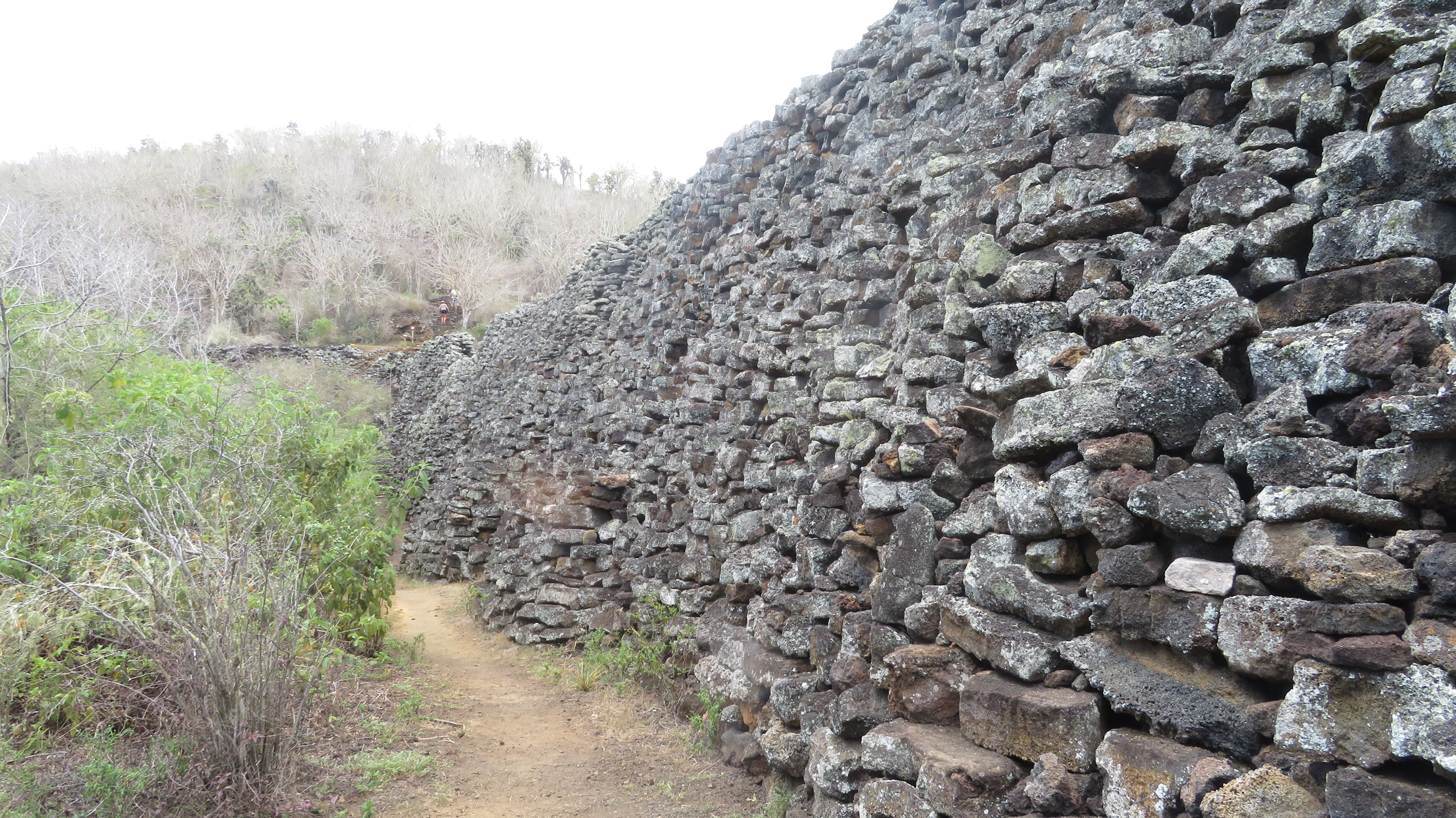
The Wall of Tears at Puerto Villamil on Isabela, the largest of the Galapagos

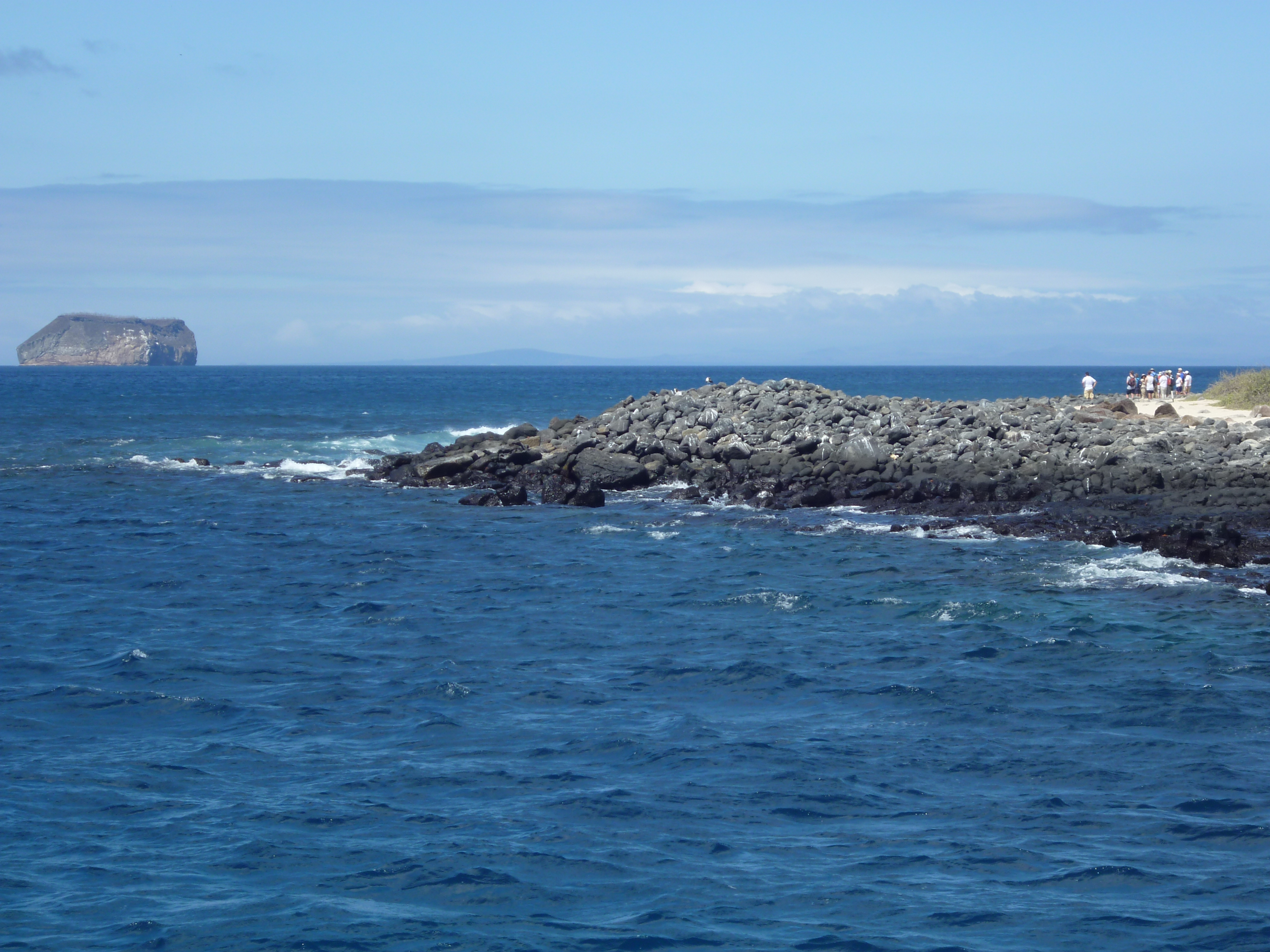
North Seymour Island with Daphne Island in the distance

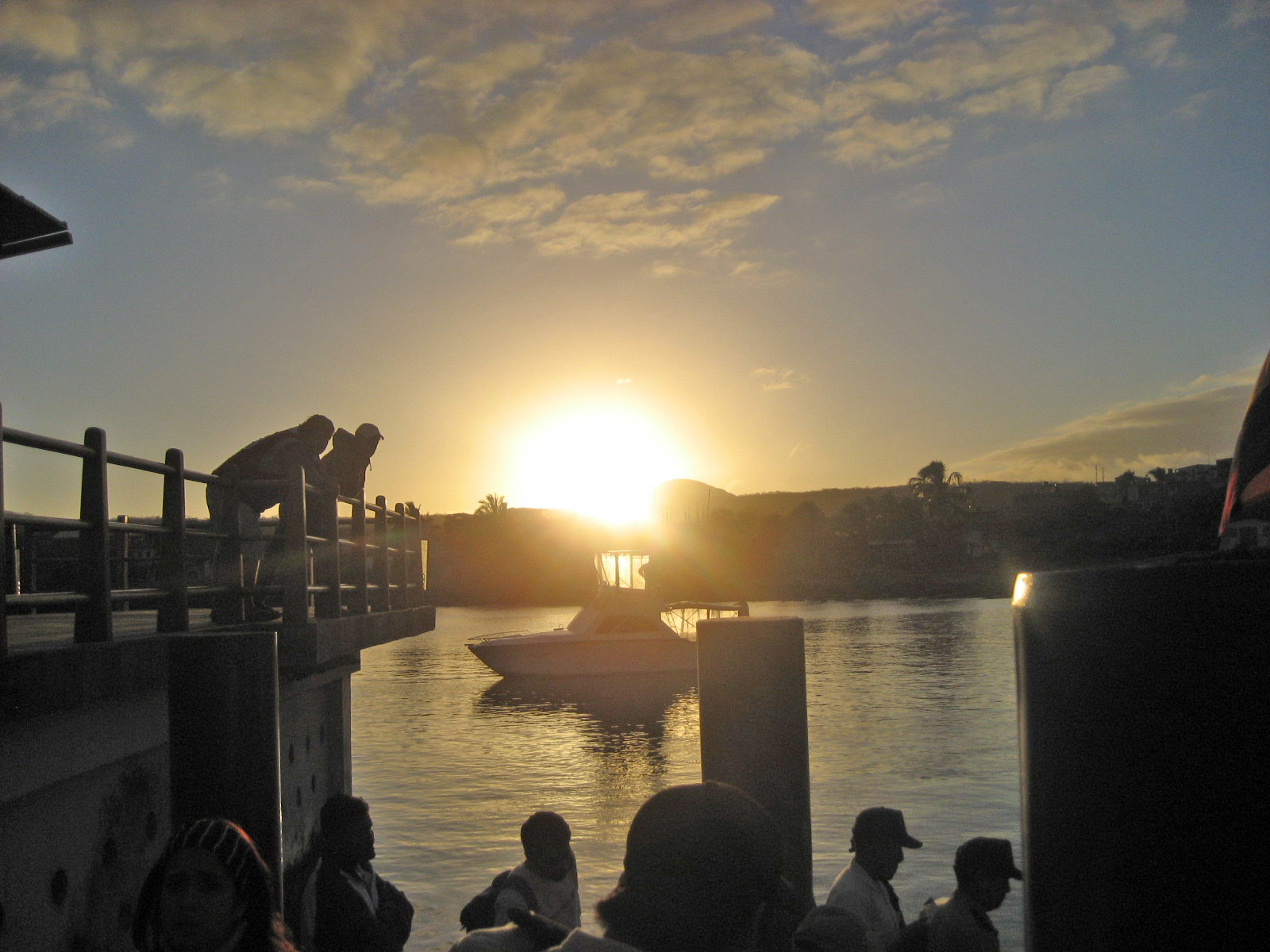
Sunset on San Cristóbal Island

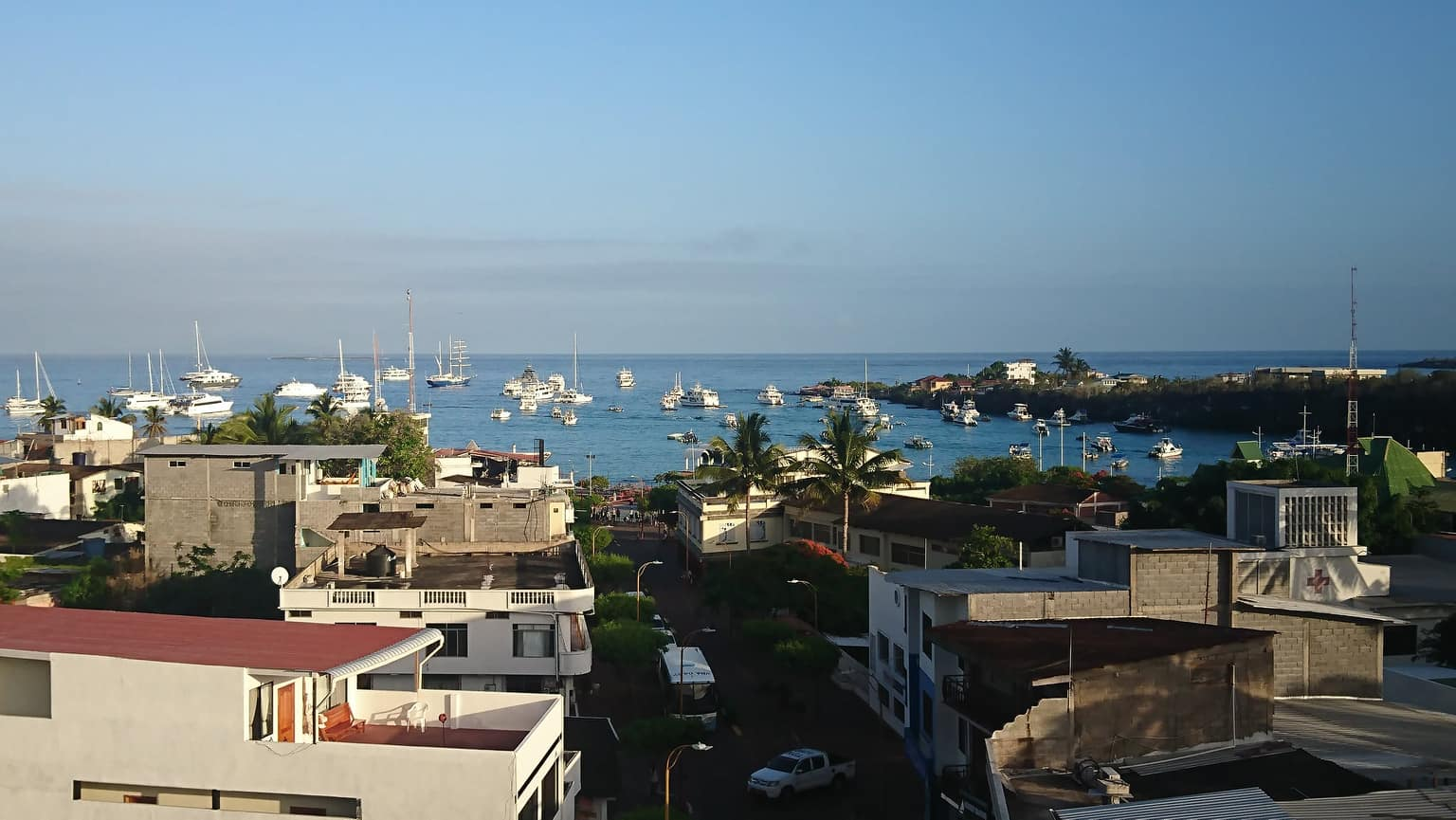
Puerto Ayora, the largest town in the Galápagos

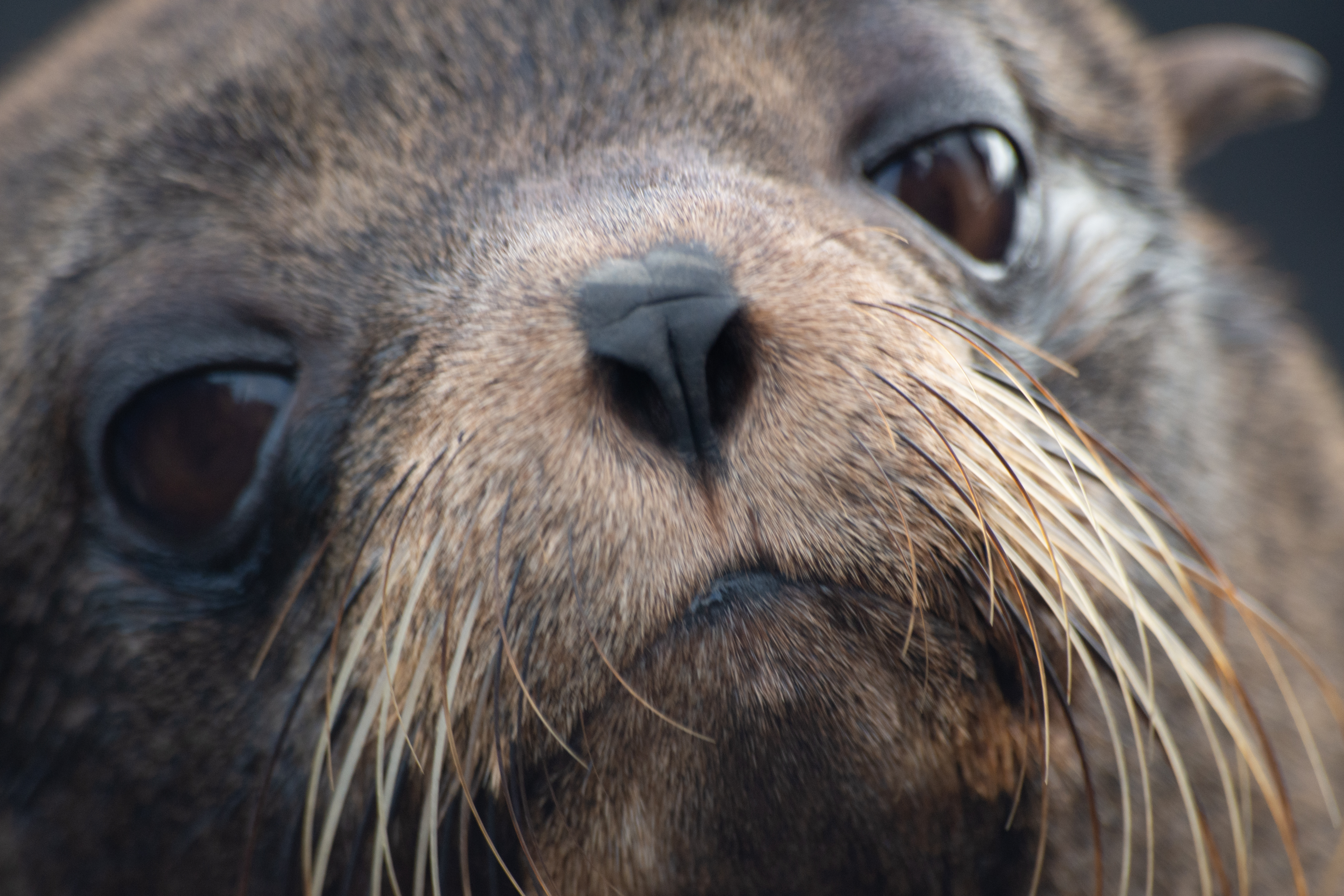
A Galápagos fur seal on Santiago Island

An animated tour of the Galápagos

NASA oceanographer Gene Carl Feldman reflecting on the islands

There are 19 islands with areas above 1 square kilometer (0.39 sq mi).

Island	English Name	Area	Highest Point	Notable Features
Isabela	Albemarle	4,588 square kilometers (1,771 sq mi)	1,707 meters (5,600 ft)	Six prominent shield volcanoes, five active, as well as extensive lava fields.
Santa Cruz	Indefatigable	986 square kilometers (381 sq mi)	864 meters (2,835 ft)	Located in the center of the archipelago, with about twenty inactive smaller volcanic cones.
Fernandina	Narborough	642 square kilometers (248 sq mi)	1,494 meters (4,902 ft)	The youngest and westernmost of the islands, with active volcano that erupts periodically.
Santiago	James	585 square kilometers (226 sq mi)	907 meters (2,976 ft)	Dominated by Cerro Cowan, it contains extensive lava flows.
San Cristóbal	Chatham	547 square kilometers (211 sq mi)	896 meters (2,940 ft)	The most eastern island, made up of two inactive volcanoes.
Floreana	Charles	173 square kilometers (67 sq mi)	640 meters (2,100 ft)	Most southern of the main islands, with one of the only sources of fresh water: a large scenic lagoon.
Marchena	Bindloe	130 square kilometers (50 sq mi)	343 meters (1,125 ft)	Relatively remote, located well to the north of Santiago.
Española	Hood	60 square kilometers (23 sq mi)	206 meters (676 ft)	The oldest of the islands, with dramatic cliffs lining its southern coast.
Pinta	Abingdon	60 square kilometers (23 sq mi)	850 meters (2,790 ft)	In the north of the archipelago, with sharp, steep cliffs up to 300 meters (980 ft) in height.
Baltra	South Seymour	27 square kilometers (10 sq mi)	100 meters (330 ft)	The airstrip occupies a good part of the flat island.
Santa Fe	Barrington	24 square kilometers (9.3 sq mi)	259 meters (850 ft)	Old island with lavas dating back more than 3 million years. It is located to the southeast of Santa Cruz.
Pinzón	Duncan	18 square kilometers (6.9 sq mi)	458 meters (1,503 ft)	A mostly arid island located directly west of Santa Cruz.
Genovesa	Tower	14 square kilometers (5.4 sq mi)	76 meters (249 ft)	Located north of the main islands, between Santa Cruz and San Cristóbal.
Rábida	Jervis	4.9 square kilometers (1.9 sq mi)	367 meters (1,204 ft)	Small island in the geographic center of the archipelago, with reddish sand beaches.
Seymour Norte	North Seymour	1.9 square kilometers (0.73 sq mi)	0 meters (0 ft)	Small, flat island.
Wolf	Wenman	1.3 square kilometers (0.50 sq mi)	253 meters (830 ft)	Located about 160 kilometers (99 mi) from the other islands. It is the top of a very large volcano based in the ocean bottom.
Tortuga	—	1.3 square kilometers (0.50 sq mi)	—	
Bartolomé	Bartholemew	1.2 square kilometers (0.46 sq mi)	114 meters (374 ft)	Made of tuff cones and spatter cones, including Pinnacle Rock, an immense tuff cone.
Darwin	Culpepper	1.1 square kilometers (0.42 sq mi)	165 meters (541 ft)	Wolf's twin island, also the peak of a large oceanic volcano.

=== Minor islands ===
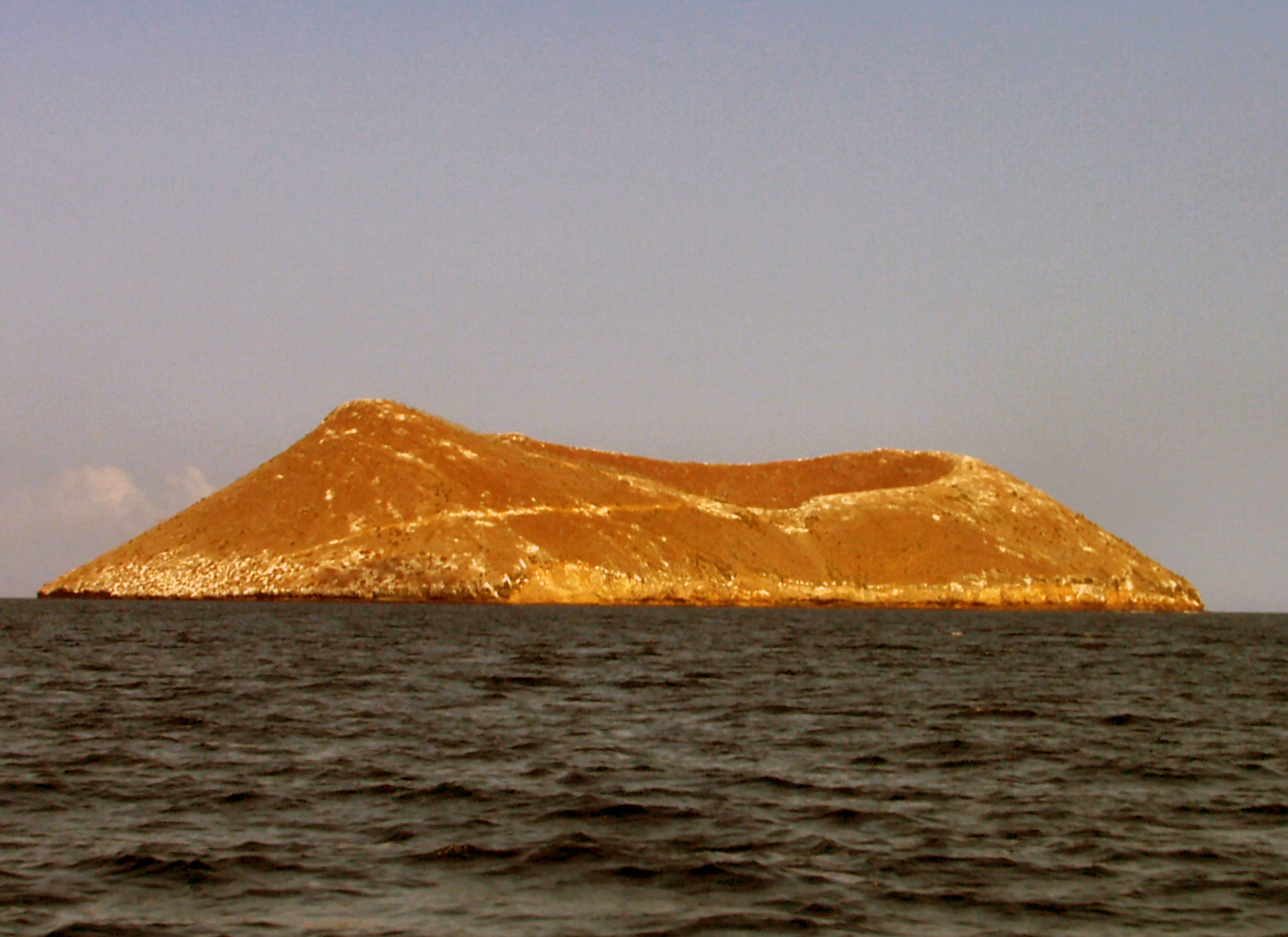
Daphne Major

- Daphne Major – A small island directly north of Santa Cruz and directly west of Baltra, this very inaccessible island appears, though unnamed, on Ambrose Cowley's 1684 chart. It is important as the location of multidecade finch population studies by Peter and Rosemary Grant.
- South Plaza Island (Isla Plaza Sur) – It is named in honor of a former president of Ecuador, General Leónidas Plaza. It has an area of 0.13 km^{2} (0.050 sq mi) and a maximum altitude of 23 m (75 ft). The flora of South Plaza includes Opuntia cactus and Sesuvium plants, which form a reddish carpet on top of the lava formations. Iguanas (land, marine and some hybrids of both species) are abundant, and large numbers of birds can be observed from the cliffs at the southern part of the island, including tropic birds and swallow-tailed gulls.
- North Plaza Island – This island lies north of South Plaza Island.
- Nameless Island – A small islet used mostly for scuba diving.
- Roca Redonda – An islet approximately 25 km (16 mi) northwest of Isabela. Herman Melville devotes the third and fourth sketches of The Encantadas to describing this islet (which he calls "Rock Rodondo") and the view from it.
- Guy Fawkes Island – A small island of the coast of Santa Cruz. It is an island group composed of two crescent-shaped islets—North Guy Fawkes I. (I. Guy Fawkes Norte) and South Guy Fawkes I. (I. Guy Fawkes Sud)—and two rocks located northwest of Santa Cruz Island in the Galápagos Archipelago in Ecuador. The group is uninhabited but sometimes visited by scuba divers.
- Isla Beagle – This small island near to Santiago is largely uninhabited.
- Isla Caldwell – This island is near Floreana and has a length of 3.06 kilometers.
- Isla Campéon – Also known as Champion island, this islet is 1.64 kilometers in length and is one of the last refuges of the Floreana mockingbird.
- Isla Watson – One of the many islets around Floreana island.
- Enderby Island – Besides of Isla Campéon, this island is another place where the Floreana mockingbird lives.
- Gardner Island (Galapagos) – In the Galapagos Islands, there are two places called Gardner Island. There is one island near Española, and one island near Floreana.
- Mosquera Island – Mosquera is one of the smallest islands in the archipelago. Located between North Seymour and Baltra Islands, it consists of many coral reefs, making it a great site for practicing snorkel and observing the marine life.

Mosquera is also home to one of the largest colonies of sea lions in the Galapagos, and there have been occasional orca whale sightings around the islet. As is usual in the archipelago, the islet is shared by many seabirds, marine iguanas, blue-footed boobies and Sally Lightfoot crabs.

- Tortuga Island – Isla Tortuga is uniquely shaped like a crescent. The island is actually a collapsed volcano that is a nesting location for a variety of seabirds such as Frigatebirds and the elusive Red-Billed Tropicbird, among others.
- Isla Los Hermanos – A small island off Isabela.
- Isla Sombrero Chino – One of the most recognizable of the Galapagos Islands, Sombrero Chino's name means "Chinese Hat." It's easy to see why: this islet off Santiago is shaped like an old-fashioned Chinaman's hat, a gently sloping cone rising out of the clear Galapagos water. Because of its distinctive shape, Sombrero Chino has fascinated visitors as long as they have been coming to Galapagos.
- Daphne Minor – Located near, and similar to, Daphne Major, as both are tuff cones devoid of trees.
- Las Tintoreras Islet – One of a group of seven small islets to the south of the bay of Puerto Villamil in the island of Isabela, that forms part of the archipelago and national park of the Galapagos Islands, including administratively in the Province Of Galapagos.
- Leon Dormido – Island located off San Cristobal.Visually striking, the two rocks of Leon Dormindo, which means "Sleeping Lion," soar to some 450 feet (140 meters) into the air. The mild current between the two rocks creates a hotbed habitat for an extremely diverse group of fish and mammals.
- Isla Cowley – A very small island located off Isabela.
- Isla El Edén – Eden Island is a sliver of volcanic rock located along the northwest shore of the large Santa Cruz Island. Isla El Edén measures less than 2,000 square feet in diameter. Despite its small size of .01 square miles, it exhibits three distinct landscapes. One is flat, arid and barren. In the middle is a 233 foot cliff.
- Isla Albany – Albany Rock is a small crescent shaped islet located in the northwest of Santiago Island.
- Isla Onslow – One of the many islands near Floreana.
- Corona Del Diablo – Corona Del Diablo, also known as the Devil's Crown, located off Floreana Island, not far from the shore, is a ring of uneven rocks that stick out of the water. Its name comes from the fact that it looks almost like an uncomfortable crown, that only the devil could wear.

== Climate ==
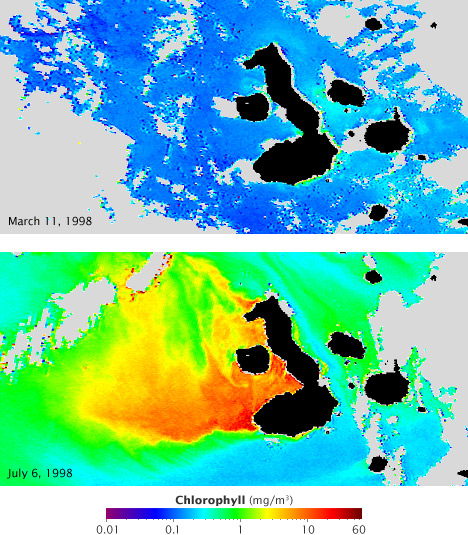
Satellite maps of the concentration of chlorophyll (representing abundance of phytoplankton) during El Niño (top) and La Niña (bottom). The color scale goes from blue at the lowest concentrations to red at the highest. Currents that normally fertilize phytoplankton reverse during El Niño, resulting in barren oceans. The same currents are strengthened by La Niña, resulting in an explosion of ocean life.

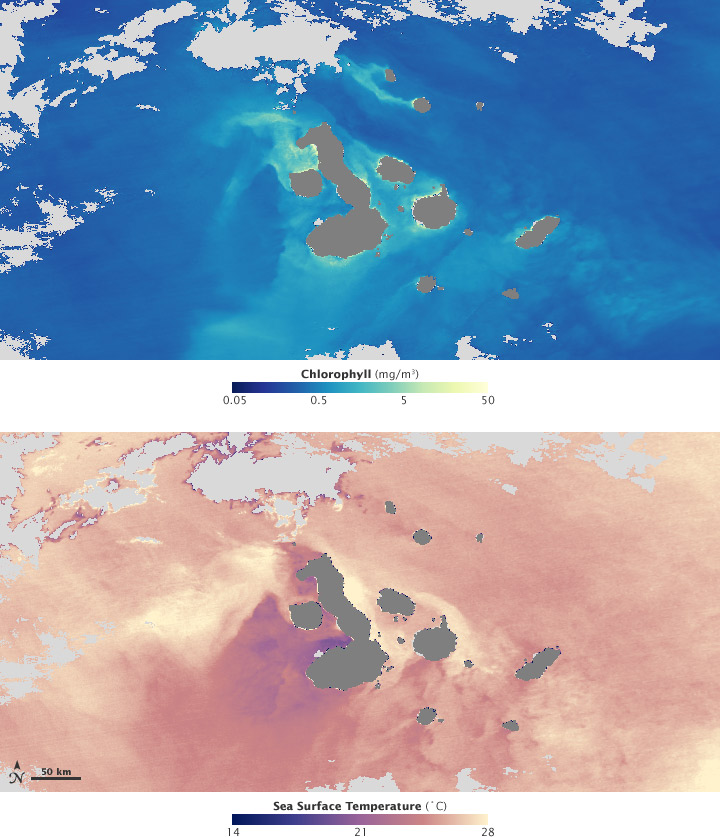
A satellite map of chlorophyll and phytoplankton concentration (top) paired with a map of oceanic surface temperatures at the same time (bottom). The thriving populations represented by green and yellow in the upper map correlate to areas of higher surface temperatures represented by yellow in the lower map (2 March 2009).

Although the islands are located on the equator, the Humboldt Current brings cold water to them, causing frequent drizzles during most of the year. The weather is regularly influenced by the El Niño events, which occur every 3 to 7 years and bring warmer sea surface temperatures, a rise in sea level, greater wave action, and a depletion of nutrients in the water. This cycle can greatly affect the precipitation from one year to another. At Charles Darwin Station, the precipitation during the month of March in the particularly wet year of 1969 was 249.0 mm (9.80 in), but during March 1970 the next year it was only 1.2 mm (0.047 in).

There is also a large range in precipitation from one place to another and across the islands' two main seasons. The archipelago is mainly characterized by a mixture of a tropical savanna climate and a semi-arid climate, transitioning to a tropical rainforest climate in the northwest. During the rainy season known as the garúa from June to November, the temperature near the sea is around 22 °C (72 °F), a steady cool wind blows from south and southeast, frequent drizzles (garúas) for days, and dense fog conceals the islands. During the warm season from December to May, the average sea and air temperatures rise to around 25 °C (77 °F), there is no wind at all, and the sun shines apart from sporadic strong downpours. Weather also changes as altitude increases on the larger islands. Temperature decreases gradually with altitude, while precipitation increases due to the condensation of moisture from clouds on the slopes. This pattern of generally wet highlands and drier lowlands affects the plant life on the larger islands. The vegetation in the highlands tends to be green and lush, with tropical woodland in places. The lowland areas tend to have arid and semi-arid vegetation, with many thorny shrubs and cacti and areas of barren volcanic rock.

Some islands also fall within the rain shadow of others during some seasons. During March 1969, the precipitation over Charles Darwin Station on the southern coast of Santa Cruz was 249.0 mm (9.80 in), while on nearby Baltra Island the precipitation during the same month was only 137.6 mm (5.42 in). This is because Baltra is located behind Santa Cruz when the prevailing winds are southerly, causing more moisture to fall on the Santa Cruz highlands.

Climate data for San Cristóbal Island, 1981–2010 normals
Month	Jan	Feb	Mar	Apr	May	Jun	Jul	Aug	Sep	Oct	Nov	Dec	Year
Mean daily maximum °C (°F)	29.2 (84.6)	30.3 (86.5)	30.5 (86.9)	30.2 (86.4)	29.2 (84.6)	27.6 (81.7)	26.4 (79.5)	25.6 (78.1)	25.7 (78.3)	26.0 (78.8)	27.0 (80.6)	27.8 (82.0)	28.0 (82.3)
Daily mean °C (°F)	26.1 (79.0)	26.7 (80.1)	26.7 (80.1)	26.5 (79.7)	25.9 (78.6)	24.7 (76.5)	23.5 (74.3)	22.7 (72.9)	22.8 (73.0)	23.0 (73.4)	23.9 (75.0)	24.8 (76.6)	24.8 (76.6)
Mean daily minimum °C (°F)	22.9 (73.2)	23.1 (73.6)	22.9 (73.2)	22.8 (73.0)	22.7 (72.9)	21.7 (71.1)	20.7 (69.3)	19.8 (67.6)	19.8 (67.6)	20.0 (68.0)	20.9 (69.6)	21.7 (71.1)	21.6 (70.9)
Average precipitation mm (inches)	83.4 (3.28)	107.4 (4.23)	106.3 (4.19)	94.9 (3.74)	41.9 (1.65)	32.5 (1.28)	18.8 (0.74)	9.8 (0.39)	7.6 (0.30)	11.0 (0.43)	12.6 (0.50)	51.5 (2.03)	577.7 (22.76)
Average precipitation days	11	10	11	6	5	8	13	14	12	11	8	10	119
Source: World Meteorological Organization

The following table for the especially wet year of 1969 shows the variation of precipitation in different places of Santa Cruz Island:

Location	Charles Darwin Station	Devine Farm	Media Luna
Altitude	6 m	320 m	620 m
January	23.0 mm	78.0 mm	172.6 mm
February	16.8 mm	155.2 mm	117.0 mm
March	249.0 mm	920.8 mm	666.7 mm
April	68.5 mm	79.5 mm	166.4 mm
May	31.4 mm	214.6 mm	309.8 mm
June	16.8 mm	147.3 mm	271.8 mm
July	12.0 mm	42.2 mm	135.6 mm
August	3.8 mm	13.7 mm	89.5 mm
September	18.5 mm	90.9 mm	282.6 mm
October	3.2 mm	22.6 mm	96.5 mm
November	11.0 mm	52.8 mm	172.7 mm
December	15.7 mm	84.1 mm	175.3 mm
TOTALS	469.7 mm	1901.7 mm	2656.4 mm

== Ecology ==
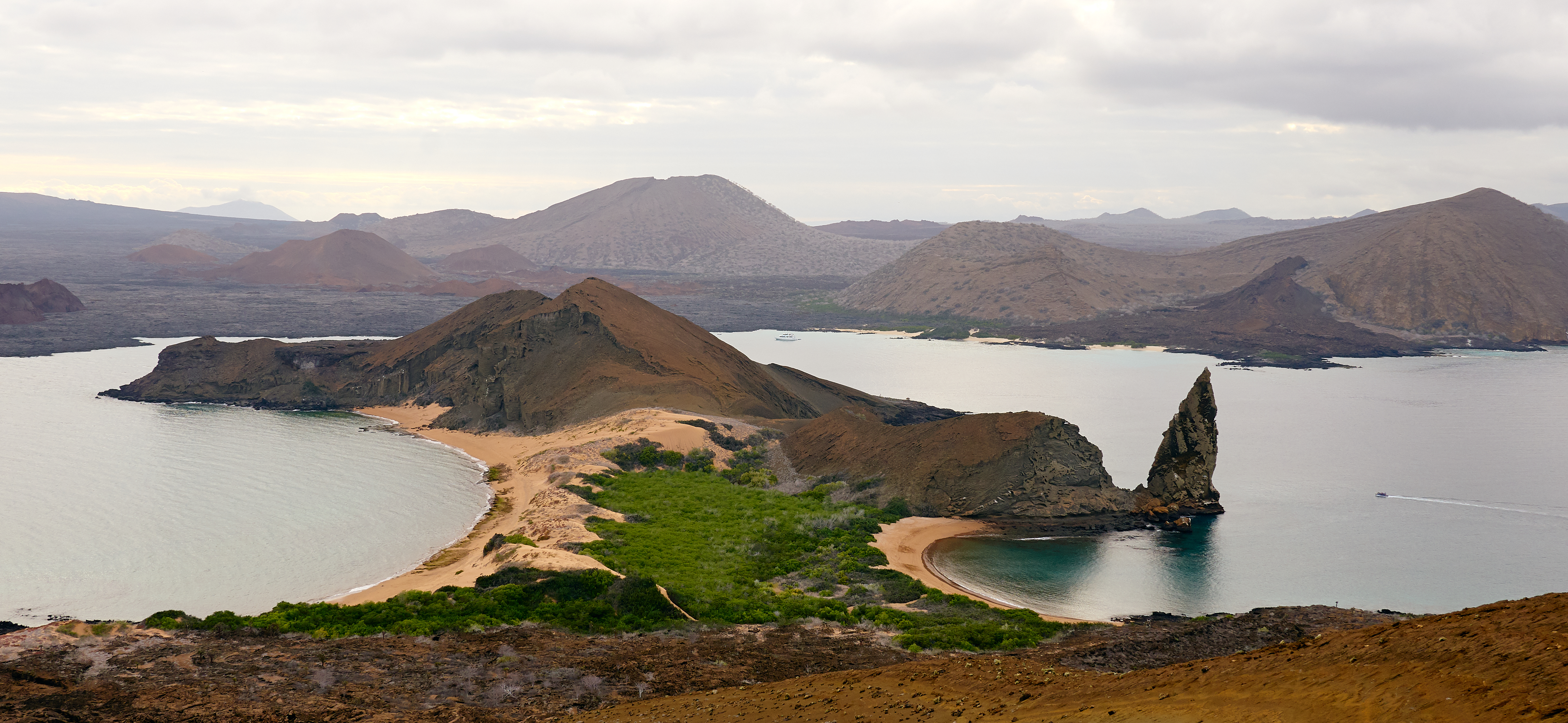
Pinnacle Rock on Bartolomé Island, with Santiago in the background and a ferry on the right for scale

=== Terrestrial ===
Most of the Galápagos is covered in semi-desert vegetation, including shrublands, grasslands, and dry forest. A few of the islands have high-elevation areas with cooler temperatures and higher rainfall, which are home to humid-climate forests and shrublands, and montane grasslands (pampas) at the highest elevations. There are about 500 species of native vascular plants on the islands, including 90 species of ferns. About 180 vascular plant species are endemic.

The islands are well known for their distinctive endemic species, including giant tortoises, finches, flightless cormorants, Galápagos lava lizards and marine iguanas, which evolved to adapt to islands' environments.

== History ==
=== Pre-Columbian era ===
Whether Polynesians or the indigenous peoples of South America ever made it to the islands is disputed. Oceanic Pacific islands in the same general area as Galápagos—including Clipperton, Cocos, the Desventuradas, the Juan Fernández Islands, and the Revillagigedos—were all uninhabited when discovered by Europeans, with no evidence to indicate any prehistoric human activity. The easternmost oceanic island in the South Pacific that was discovered with a human population was Easter Island, whose Rapa Nui people are known to be Polynesian rather than South American.

In 1572, the Spanish chronicler Pedro Sarmiento de Gamboa claimed that Topa Inca Yupanqui, the second Sapa Inca of the Inca Empire, had visited the archipelago. There is, however, little evidence for this and many experts consider it a far-fetched legend, especially since the Incas were not typically a seafaring people. A 1952 archaeological survey by Thor Heyerdahl and Arne Skjølsvold found potsherds and other artifacts from several sites on the islands that they claimed suggested visitation by South Americans during the pre-Columbian era. The group located an Inca flute and shards from more than 130 pieces of ceramics, later identified as pre-Incan. However, no remains of graves, ceremonial vessels, or buildings have ever been found, suggesting no permanent settlement occurred before the Spanish arrived in the 16th century. A 2016 reanalysis of Heyerdahl and Skjølsvold's archaeological sites rejected their conclusions. They found that—at all locations excavated by the 1952 survey—artifacts of Indian and European origin were interspersed without the distinct spatial or stratigraphic arrangement that would be expected from independent sequential deposition. (Heyerdahl and Skjølsvold had noted this in their original report while ignoring its implications.) Radiocarbon dates from the sites placed them in the post-Spanish era and preliminary paleoenvironmental analysis showed no disturbance older than 500 years before present, suggesting no evidence from the survey that the islands were visited prior to their Spanish discovery in 1535. The authors suggested that native artifacts found by Heyerdahl and Skjølsvold had probably been brought as mementos or souvenirs at the time of Spanish occupation.

A 2008 report by archeologists from the Australian National University stated that certain Asia–Pacific taxa may have been growing in the Galápagos prior to 1535. This opens a direction for future research which might "constitute a strong line of evidence for accidental or deliberate landfall in the Galápagos by a Polynesian vessel", although the report noted current scholarship finds no evidence that Pacific islands beyond Easter Island "play[ed] a 'stepping stone' role in the interaction between Amerindians or Polynesians in prehistory". The lack of fresh water on the islands seems to have limited visits and settlement, if any ever occurred.

=== European discovery ===
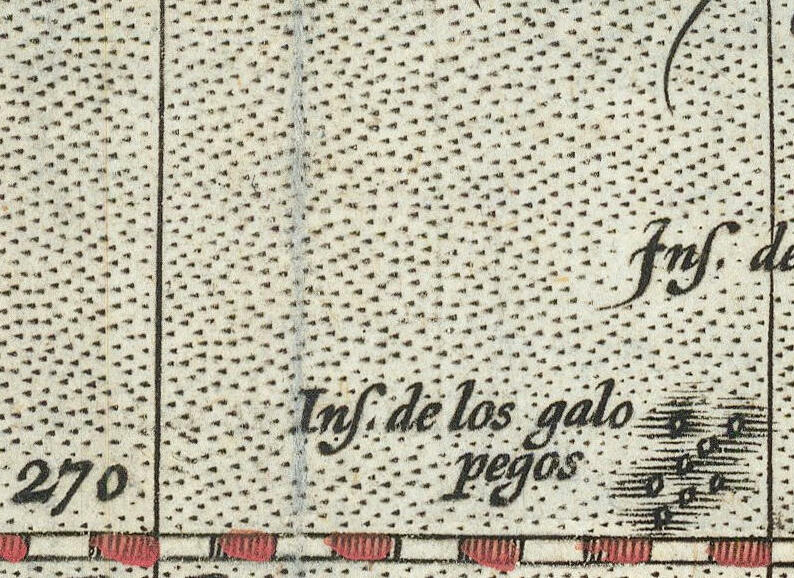
Detail of the Galápagos on Abraham Ortelius's 1570 map of the Americas

European discovery of the Galápagos Islands is recorded occurring on 10 March 1535, when the Spanish bishop of Panama Tomás de Berlanga—sailing to Peru to adjudicate a dispute between Francisco Pizarro and Diego de Almagro—drifted off course while his ship was becalmed in the Doldrums. They found the islands they visited uninhabited and so arid and barren that two men and ten horses died for lack of fresh water and the rest were forced to subsist on cactus pads. The ship left them unclaimed and unsettled. Berlanga, however, wrote a brief account of the islands, their condition, and their main wildlife for Charles V.

The Galápagos Islands first appeared on the maps of Gerardus Mercator and Abraham Ortelius around 1570.

=== Pirate era ===
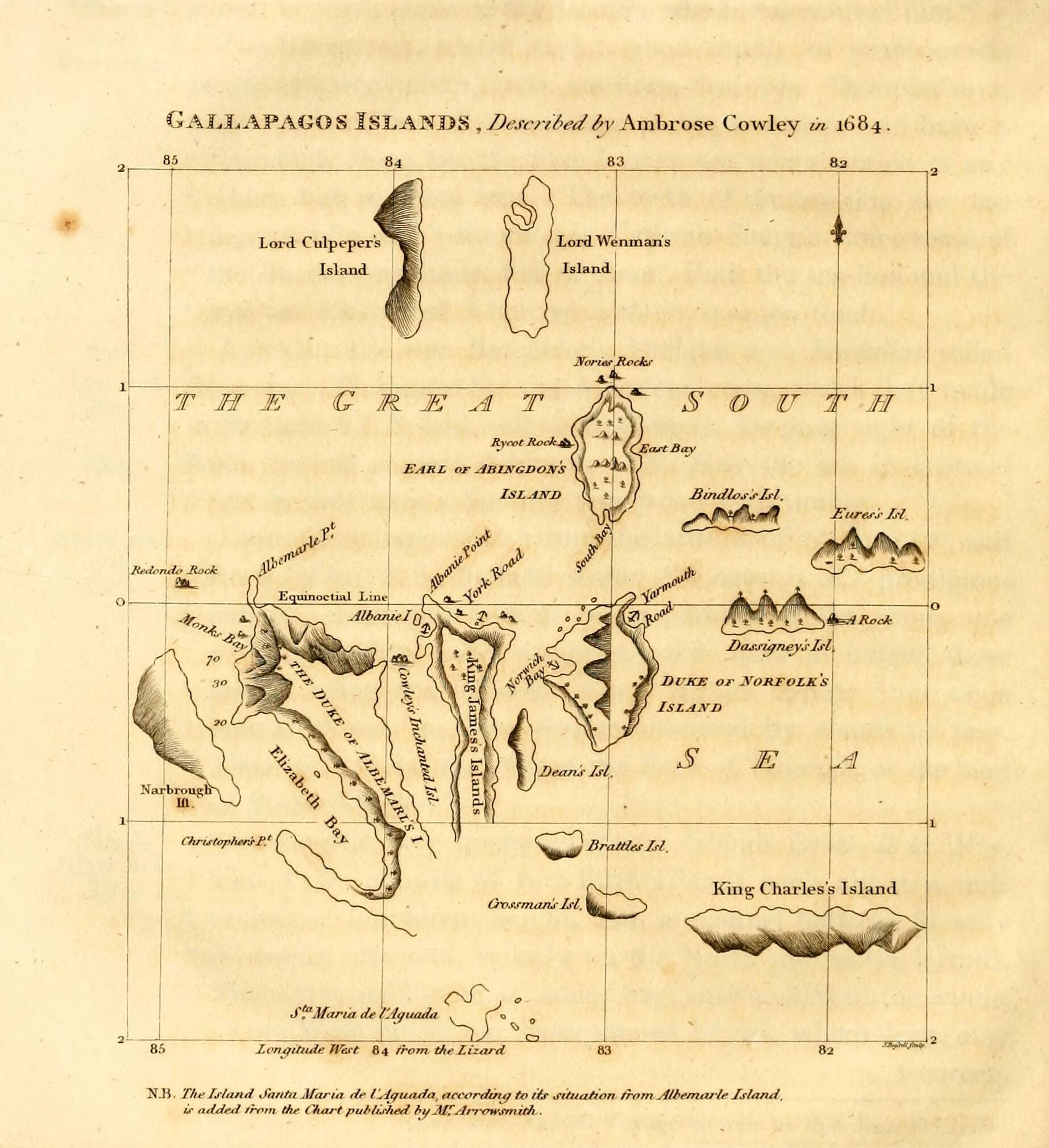
The chart of the Galápagos published by the English pirate William Ambrosia Cowley in 1684, the source of many of the islands' English names

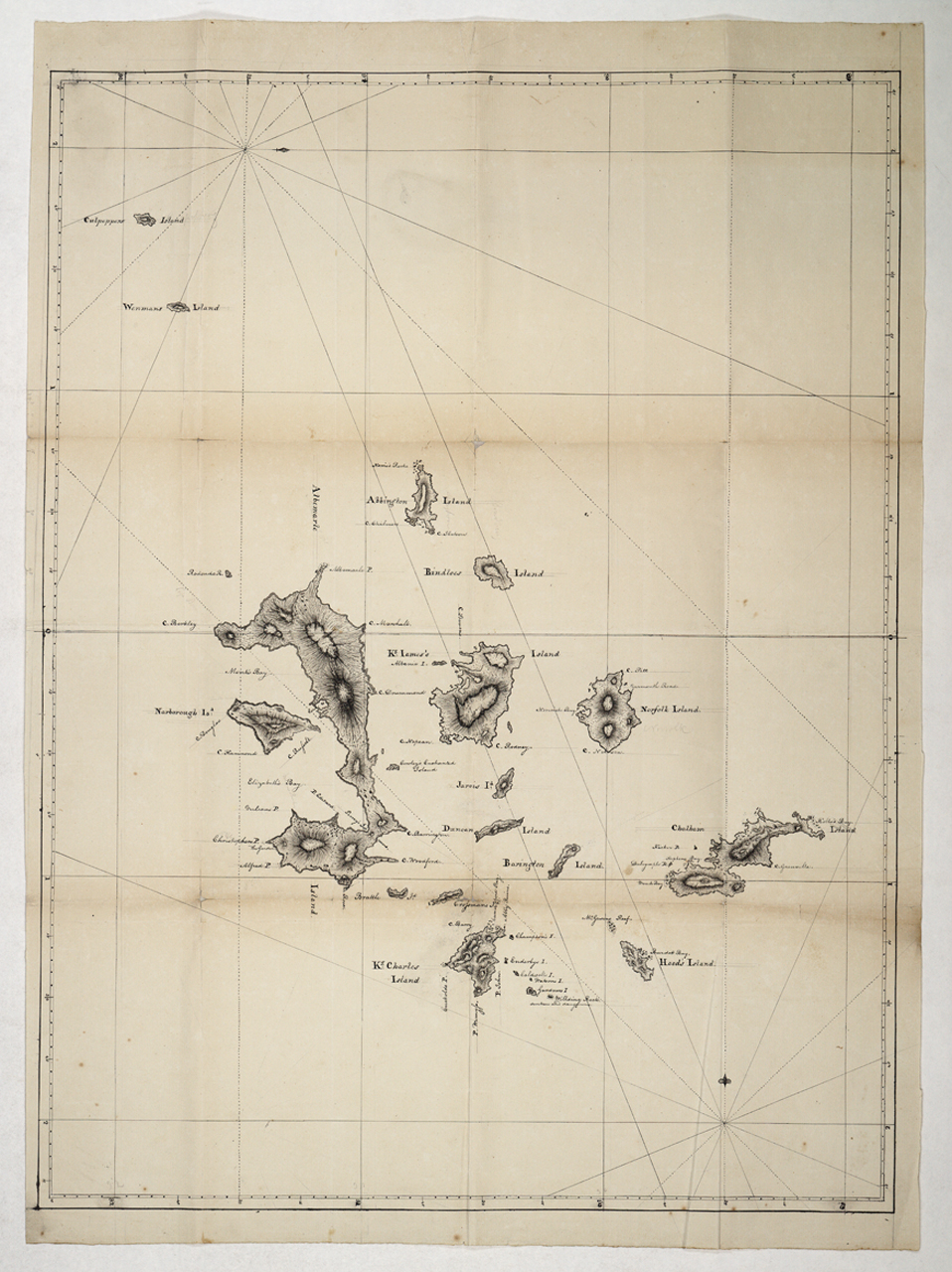
A manuscript map of the islands from the charts drafted by James Colnett of the British Royal Navy in 1793, adding additional names

The first English captain to visit the Galápagos Islands was Richard Hawkins in 1593. Until the early 19th century, the archipelago was often used as a hideout by (mostly English) pirates who attacked Spanish treasure fleets carrying gold, silver, and supplies from Peru to Panama and Spain. The English pirate William Ambrosia Cowley thoroughly mapped the islands in 1684 while sailing on John Cook's Batchelor's or Bachelor's Delight and John Eaton's Nicholas as they raided Peruvian shipping. One cargo captured that year was 7–8 tuns of quince marmalade, whose remains scattered pottery around the islands. Publishing the first thorough chart of the islands, Cowley coined the English names for 16 of the islands, chiefly honoring English royalty, nobles, and Jamaican officials of the era who might provide future patronage.

In 1793, during the early French Revolutionary Wars, the British captain James Colnett described the flora and fauna of Galápagos and suggested the islands could be used as a base for whalers operating in the Pacific. Colnett improved upon Cowley's chart, coining additional names although accidentally transferring Cowley's Charles Island from Española to Floreana. Whalers and maritime fur traders killed and captured thousands of the Galápagos tortoises to extract their fat. The tortoises could be kept on board ship as a means of providing fresh protein, as these animals could survive for several months on board without any food or water. The hunting of the tortoises was responsible for greatly diminishing, and in some cases eliminating, certain species. Along with whalers came the fur-seal hunters, who brought the population of this animal close to extinction.

=== 19th century ===
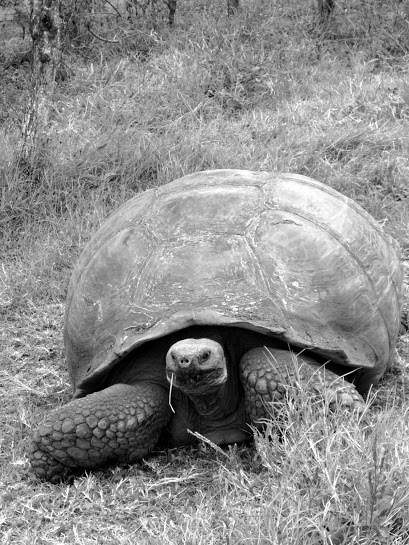
A Galápagos tortoise (Chelonoidis nigra) on Santa Cruz. C. nigra is the largest living species of tortoise, hunted to near extinction during the islands' whaling era.

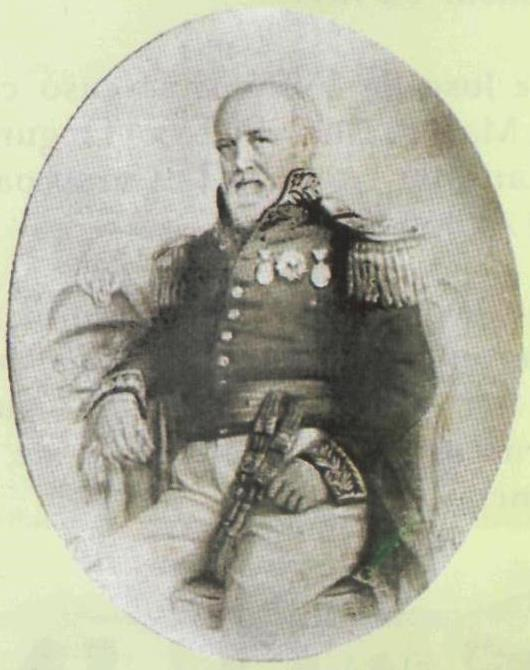
Gen. José de Villamil, founder of the Ecuadorian Navy and first governor of the islands

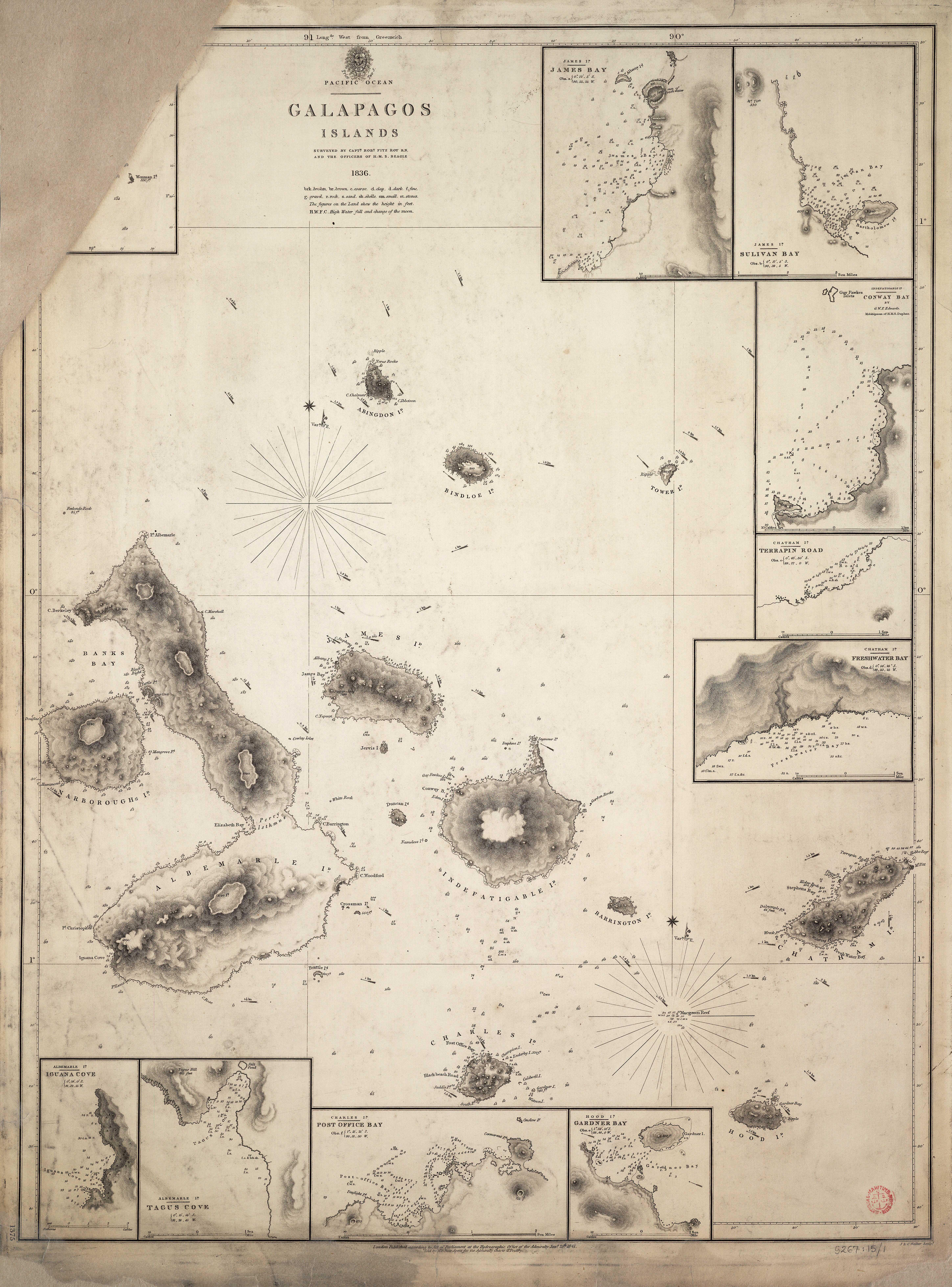
The 1841 Admiralty chart drafted from FitzRoy's survey of the islands on HMS Beagle

The first known permanent human resident on Galápagos was Patrick Watkins, an Irish sailor who was marooned on the Floreana from 1807 to 1809. According to later accounts, Watkins managed to survive by hunting, growing vegetables and trading with visiting whalers before stealing a longboat from a whaling ship, impressing five of its crew as his "slaves", and navigating to Guayaquil on the Ecuadorian mainland. Watkins was the only one of the six to survive the journey.

In 1818, the Nantucket whaleship Globe under Captain George Washington Gardner discovered a "mother lode" of sperm whales some thousand miles west of the South American coast approximately at the equator. He returned to Nantucket in 1820 with more than 2,000 barrels of sperm whale oil and the news of his discovery. This led to an influx of whaleships to exploit the new whaling ground and the Galápagos Islands became a frequent stop for the whalers both before and after visiting what came to be known as the Offshore Grounds. This led to the establishment in the Galápagos Islands of a kind of unofficial "post office" where whaleships stopped to pick up and drop off letters as well as for provisioning and repairing.

In October 1820, the whaleship Essex out of Nantucket stopped at the Galápagos for these purposes on its way to the Offshore Grounds. On Colnett's Charles Island, while most of the crew were hunting tortoises one crewmember, English boatsteerer Thomas Chappel—for reasons still unclear—lit a fire which quickly burned out of control. Some of the tortoise hunters had a narrow escape and had to run a gauntlet of fire to get back to the ship. Soon almost the entire island was in flames. Crewmembers reported that after a day of sailing away they could still see the flames against the horizon. One crewmember who returned to the Galápagos several years afterward described the entire island as still a blackened wasteland.

Ecuador won its independence from Spain in 1822 and seceded from Gran Colombia in 1830. Gen. José de Villamil, the founder of the Ecuadorian Navy, led the push to colonize and settle the islands before Ecuador's neighbors or the European empires could occupy them. He formed the Galapagos Settlement Company in mid-1831 and, with President Juan José Flores's support, sent Col. Ignacio Hernández with a dozen craftsmen to begin the settlement on Charles Island—renamed "Floriana" in the president's honour—early the next year. Hernández conducted a formal ceremony of annexation on Floreana on 12 February 1832, now celebrated locally as Galápagos Day or the Day of the Province. (Darwin's birthday was the same day, as was Francisco de Orellana's arrival at the headwaters of the Amazon River in 1542, celebrated on the mainland as Amazon Day.) Villamil arrived in September and established Haven of Peace (Asilo de Paz or de la Paz) in the island's highlands. The initial colonists who joined him were Ecuadorian soldiers—chiefly political prisoners—whose death sentences were commuted in exchange for their agreement to permanently settle the islands with their families. They were joined in October by additional artisans and farmers, bringing the population to about 120, at which point Villamil was formally made the area's first governor. Villamil's lieutenant governor was the Norwegian-born American and Chilean sailor and shipwright Nicholas Oliver Lawson. Haven of Peace was originally successful and peaceful but, after being named a penal colony in March 1833, violence and costs began to rise. Villamil was faced with bankruptcy by 1837 and resigned his post, founding a colony of 21 on Indefatigable Island—renamed Bolivia—and leaving Lawson as its mayor. Gen. Villamil's successors—incompetent, strict, or both—prompted a bloody uprising in 1841 that caused most settlers to return to the mainland. Villamil returned to try to rebuild afterwards but was unsuccessful and abandoned the attempt in 1848.

Gould's illustration of Darwin's finches

The second voyage of HMS Beagle under captain Robert FitzRoy was undertaken to better survey the coasts and harbours of South America for the British Navy's Hydrographic Department. It reached the Galápagos on 15 September 1835 and—while surveying its islands, channels, and bays—the captain and others on the crew observed the geology, plants, and wildlife on Floreana, Isabela, and Santiago before continuing on their round-the-world expedition on 20 October. The young naturalist Charles Darwin, primarily a geologist at the time, was struck by the many volcanic features they saw, later referring to the archipelago as "that land of craters". His study of several volcanic formations over the five weeks he stayed in the islands led to several important geological discoveries, including the first correct explanation for how volcanic tuff is formed. Darwin noticed the mockingbirds differed between islands, though he thought the birds now known as Darwin's finches were unrelated to each other and did not bother labelling them by island. Acting as governor of the islands while Villamil was on the mainland, Nicholas Lawson met Darwin and the British crew, mentioning in passing that the tortoises of the different islands could be easily identified by their different shells. By the end of his voyage, Darwin was beginning to wonder if the distribution of the mockingbirds and the tortoises might "undermine the stability of Species". Upon his return to England, analysis of the bird specimens he had collected showed that what had appeared to be many different species were actually finches displaying developments unique to the islands. The voyage became crucial in Darwin's development of his theory of evolution of species by natural selection, presented in the 1859 On the Origin of Species.

The Englishman William Gurney became mayor of a new settlement on Chatham Island in 1844.

In April 1888 USS Albatross, a Navy-crewed research vessel assigned to the United States Fish Commission, briefly touched eight islands in the Galapagos group for specimens; this included Wreck Bay on Chatham Island (now San Cristóbal Island) on 4 April and Charles Island (now Floreana Island) on 8 April.

José Valdizán and Manuel Julián Cobos tried a new colonization, beginning the exploitation of a type of lichen found in the islands (Roccella portentosa) used as a coloring agent. After the assassination of Valdizán by some of his workers, Cobos brought from the continent to San Cristóbal Island a group of more than a hundred workers, and tried his luck at planting sugar cane. He ruled his plantation with an iron hand, which led to his assassination in 1904. In 1897, Antonio Gil began another plantation on Isabela Island.

Over the course of a whole year, from September 1904, an expedition of the Academy of Sciences of California, led by Rollo Beck, stayed in the Galápagos collecting scientific material on geology, entomology, ornithology, botany, zoology, and herpetology. Another expedition from that Academy was done in 1932 (Templeton Crocker Expedition) to collect insects, fish, shells, fossils, birds, and plants.

=== 20th century ===
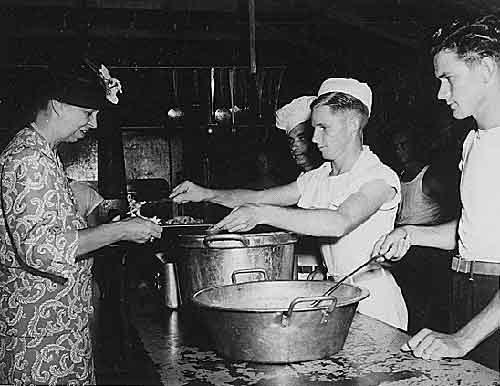
Eleanor Roosevelt visiting U.S. servicemen at Beta Base (Seymour Airport) on Baltra during World War II

Admiralty chart of the Galápagos (1953)

For a long time during the early 1900s and at least through 1929, a cash-strapped Ecuador had reached out for potential buyers of the islands to alleviate financial troubles at home. The US had repeatedly expressed its interest in buying the islands for military use as they were positioned strategically guarding the Panama Canal. Besides the United States, Japan, Germany and Chile also expressed interest in establishing bases in the islands at the turn of the century. Chile had previously acquired the Straits of Magellan and Easter Island for strategic reasons and lieutenant Gregorio Santa Cruz argued in 1903 that possessing an island in equatorial waters, like the Galápagos, would be of great benefit since the geopolitical situation of Chile was expected to drastically change when the Panama Canal opened. Another benefit would be to widen the security radius of Chile. Chile was alarmed by the United States plans to establish a Guantanamo-like base in the Galápagos Islands since it would mean that Chile's nitrate-rich northern provinces would be within the range of United States Navy. Ecuador's staunch resistance to a US purchase or bases in the islands can be credited to Chilean diplomacy, which in turn was informally backed on this issue by Great Britain and Germany.

In the 1920s and 1930s, a small wave of European settlers arrived in the islands. There occurred a series of unsolved disappearances on the island of Floreana in the 1930s among the largely European expatriate residents at the time, which prompted a book by John Treherne and the movies The Empress of Floreana, The Galápagos Affair: Satan Came to Eden, and Eden. Ecuadorian laws provided all colonists with the possibility of receiving twenty hectares each of free land, the right to maintain their citizenship, freedom from taxation for the first ten years in Galápagos, and the right to hunt and fish freely on all uninhabited islands where they might settle. The first European colonists to arrive were Norwegians who settled briefly on Floreana, before moving on to San Cristobal and Santa Cruz. A few years later, other colonists from Europe, America and Ecuador started arriving on the islands, seeking a simpler life. Descendants of the Norwegian Kastdalen family and the German Angermeyer still live on the islands.

During World War II, Ecuador authorized the United States to establish a naval base in Baltra Island, and radar stations in other strategic locations. Baltra was established as a United States Army Air Force base. Baltra was given the name of "Beta Base" along with "Alpha Base" in Nicaragua and "Gamma Base" in Salinas (continental Ecuador). The Crews stationed at Baltra and the aforementioned locations established a geographic triangle of protection in charge of patrolling the Pacific for enemy submarines, and also provided protection for the Panama Canal. After the war, the facilities were given to the government of Ecuador. Today, the island continues as an official Ecuadorian military base. The foundations and other remains of the US base can still be seen as one crosses the island. In 1946, a penal colony was established on Isabela Island, but it was suspended in 1959.

Galápagos National Park was established in 1959, with tourism starting to expand in the 1960s, imposing several restrictions upon the human population already living on the island. However, opportunities in the tourism, fishing, and farming industries attracted a mass of poor fishermen and farmers from mainland Ecuador. In the 1990s and 2000s, violent confrontations between parts of the local population and the Galápagos National Park Service occurred, including capturing and killing giant tortoises and holding staff of the Galápagos National Park Service hostage to obtain higher annual sea cucumber quotas.

=== 21st century ===
In May 2023, Credit Suisse said it would buy Ecuador's debt of $1.6 billion in a "Debt-for-nature swap". It will sell 2035 and 2040 bonds for Galapagos conservation at a reduced issue price. The U.S. International Development Finance Corporation insures the deal, which per Reuters was "in the works for more than a year", predating UBS takeover of Credit Suisse.

==== US Military presence ====
Under the Lenín Moreno government, Ecuador signed a cooperation agreement with the United States, permitting military deployments on the island of San Cristóbal. In 2025, the island's airfield was expanded to accommodate a Lockheed P-3 Orion, a Boeing E-3 Sentry and a De Havilland Canada Dash 8. US military personnel are exempt from the Galapagos islands' conservation and non-contamination policies.

== Politics ==
The flag of Galápagos Province

The islands are administered as Ecuador's Galápagos Province, established by presidential decree on 18 February 1973 during the administration of Guillermo Rodríguez Lara. The province is divided into three cantons, each covering groups of islands. The capital is Puerto Baquerizo Moreno.

== Demographics ==
The Galápagos Islands have experienced significant demographic changes over the past century, marked by substantial population growth and evolving community dynamics.

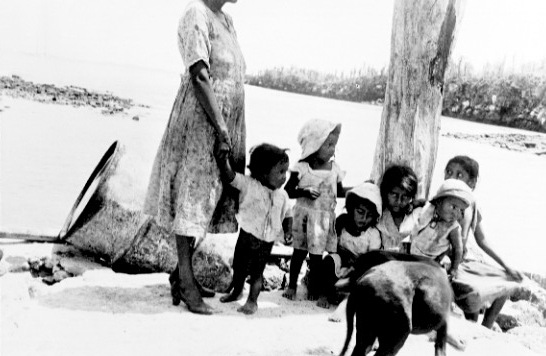
Ecuadorian children on a Galápagos beach in the 1920s

=== Population growth over time ===
- 1941: Approximately 810 inhabitants.
- 1960s: Population increased to around 3,000.
- 1972: Census recorded 3,488 residents.
- 1980s: Population exceeded 15,000.
- 2010: 25,124 inhabitants.
- 2022: Census reported 28,583 residents.

This rapid growth has been influenced by factors such as increased tourism and migration from mainland Ecuador. The permanent resident population has been growing at approximately 6.4% annually, compared to 2.1% on the mainland.

=== Ethnic composition ===
The majority of Galápagos residents are Ecuadorian Mestizos, descendants of Spanish colonists and indigenous Native Americans who migrated primarily from mainland Ecuador. Additionally, there are descendants of early European and American settlers.

=== Urbanization ===
Approximately 85% of the population resides in designated human-use areas, which constitute about 3.3% of the archipelago's land mass. The remaining area is protected as part of the national park.

==== Tourism impact ====
The Galápagos Islands attract a substantial number of tourists annually, significantly influencing the local economy and contributing to demographic changes. In 2022, the islands recorded 268,000 visitors, reflecting a 96% increase compared to 2021. Prior to the COVID-19 pandemic, tourism accounted for nearly 80% of the Galápagos economy. This heavy reliance on tourism has led to economic benefits, including employment opportunities for over two thousand residents. However, the increasing number of tourists has also raised concerns about environmental sustainability and the preservation of the islands' unique ecosystems.

== Travel ==
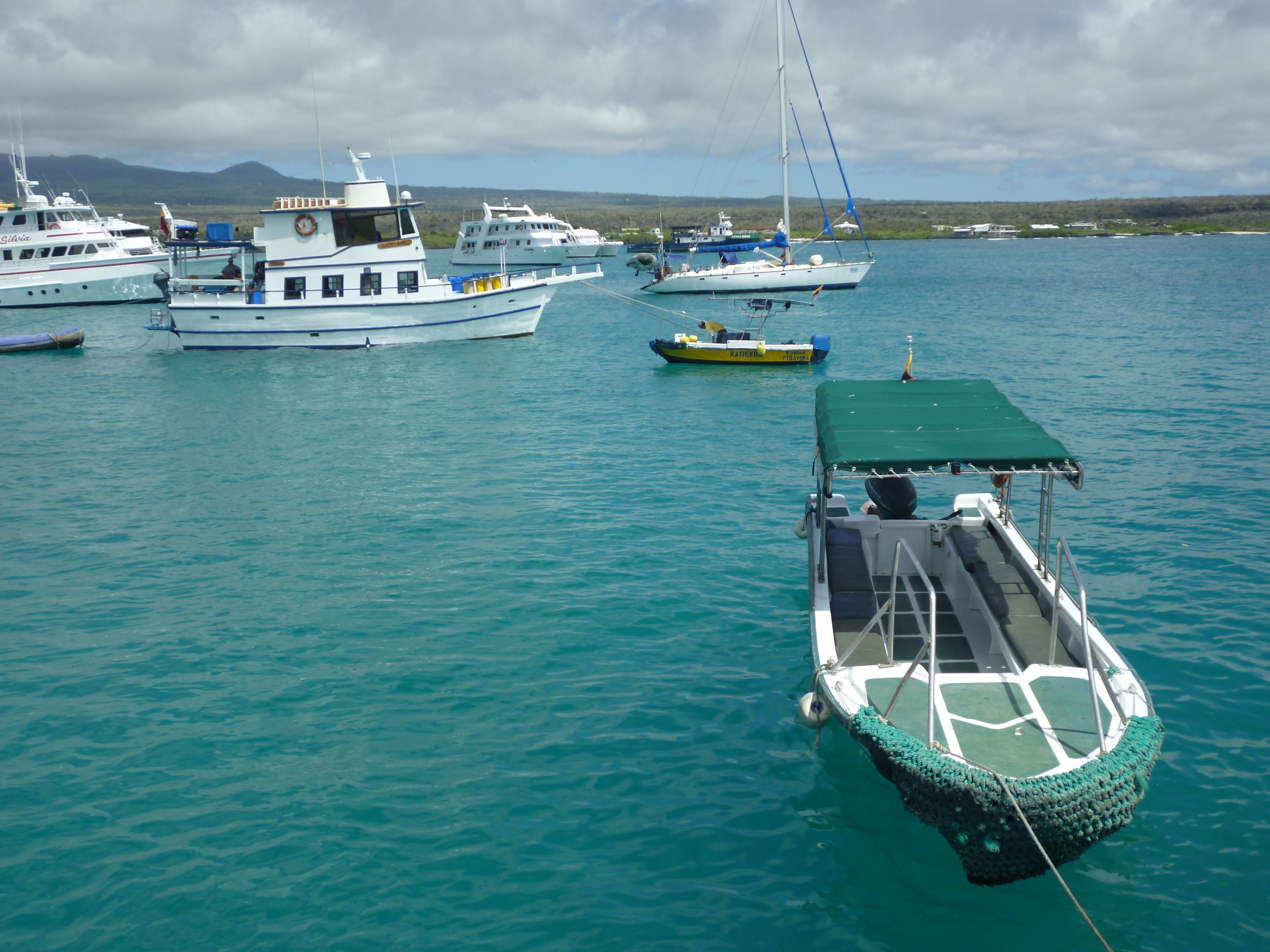
Water taxi in Puerto Ayora (2011)

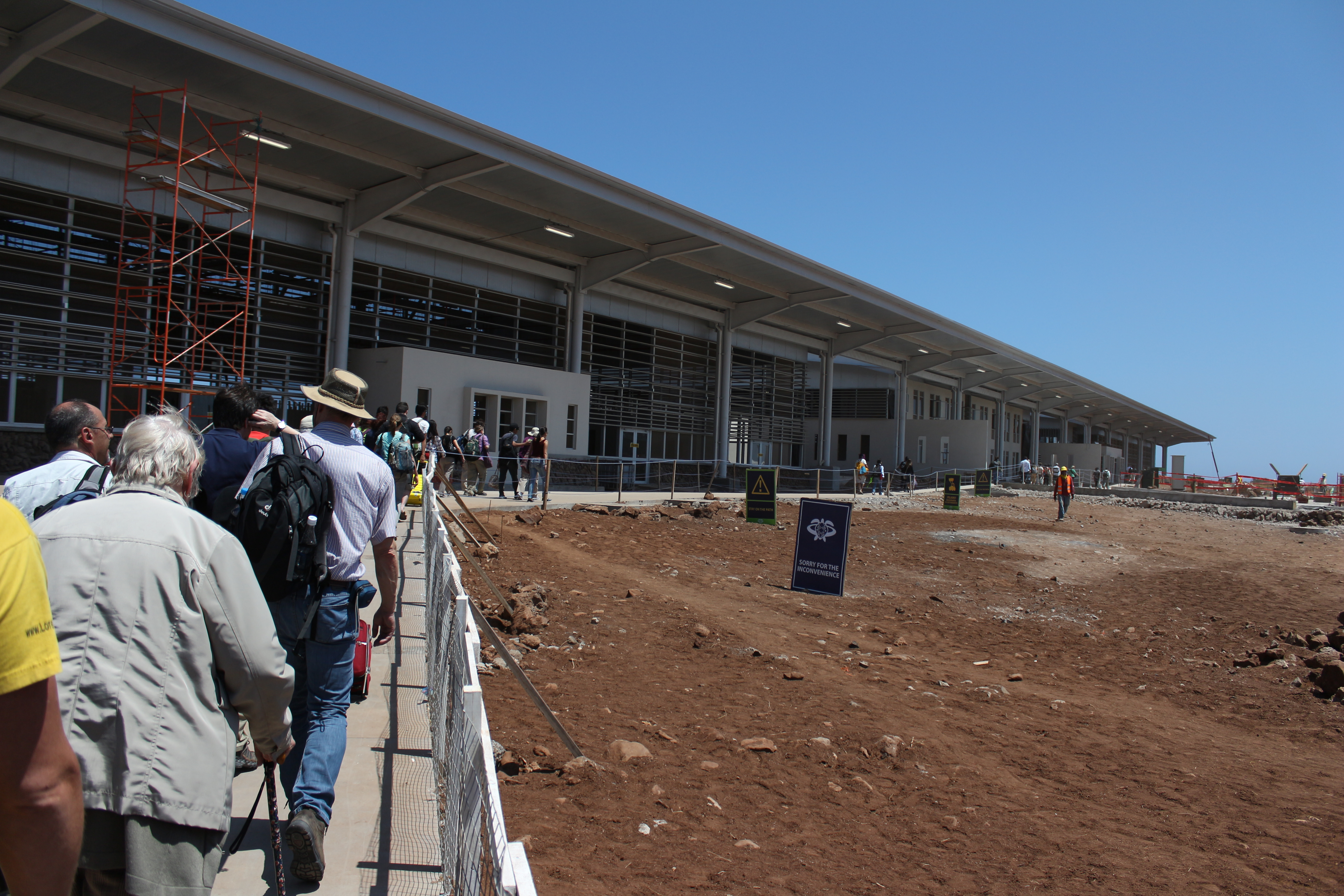
Seymour Airport on Baltra (2013)

Options for air travel to the Galápagos are limited to two islands: San Cristobal (San Cristóbal Airport) and Baltra (Seymour Airport). Private aircraft must use Baltra as it is the airport equipped with overnight plane accommodations. Seymour Airport on Baltra was renovated in 2012–2013 to accommodate larger planes.

Until 1969 the only way to visit was on a private or chartered vessel. There was no regular air service until Forrest Nelson's Hotel Galápagos began the first organized tours in April 1969. Soon other travel companies brought in tour ships and yachts, and local fishermen began converting their wooden boats for rudimentary cruising with guests. These vessels were the main source of overnight accommodations in the Galápagos. Today there are about 85 yachts and ships equipped for overnight guests. In 2006 the Baltra military governed island, was opened up to limited overnight camping. Baltra also requires permits by the military government for overnight stays on the beach. Other inhabited islands also allow camping on the beaches designated as "recreational" use to the locals. All of these camping permits are limited to number of people and nights, with most nights not to exceed three.

Land based hotels are opening on the inhabited islands of San Cristobal, Santa Cruz, Floreana and Isabela. By 2012, more than half the visitors to Galápagos made their tours using day boats and these small hotels. Restaurants, easy access and economy make this an attractive travel option.

There are only 116 visitor sites in the Galápagos: 54 land sites and 62 scuba-diving or snorkeling sites. Small groups are allowed to visit in 2- to 4-hour shifts only, to limit impact on the area. All groups are accompanied by licensed guides.

== Environmental protection policy ==
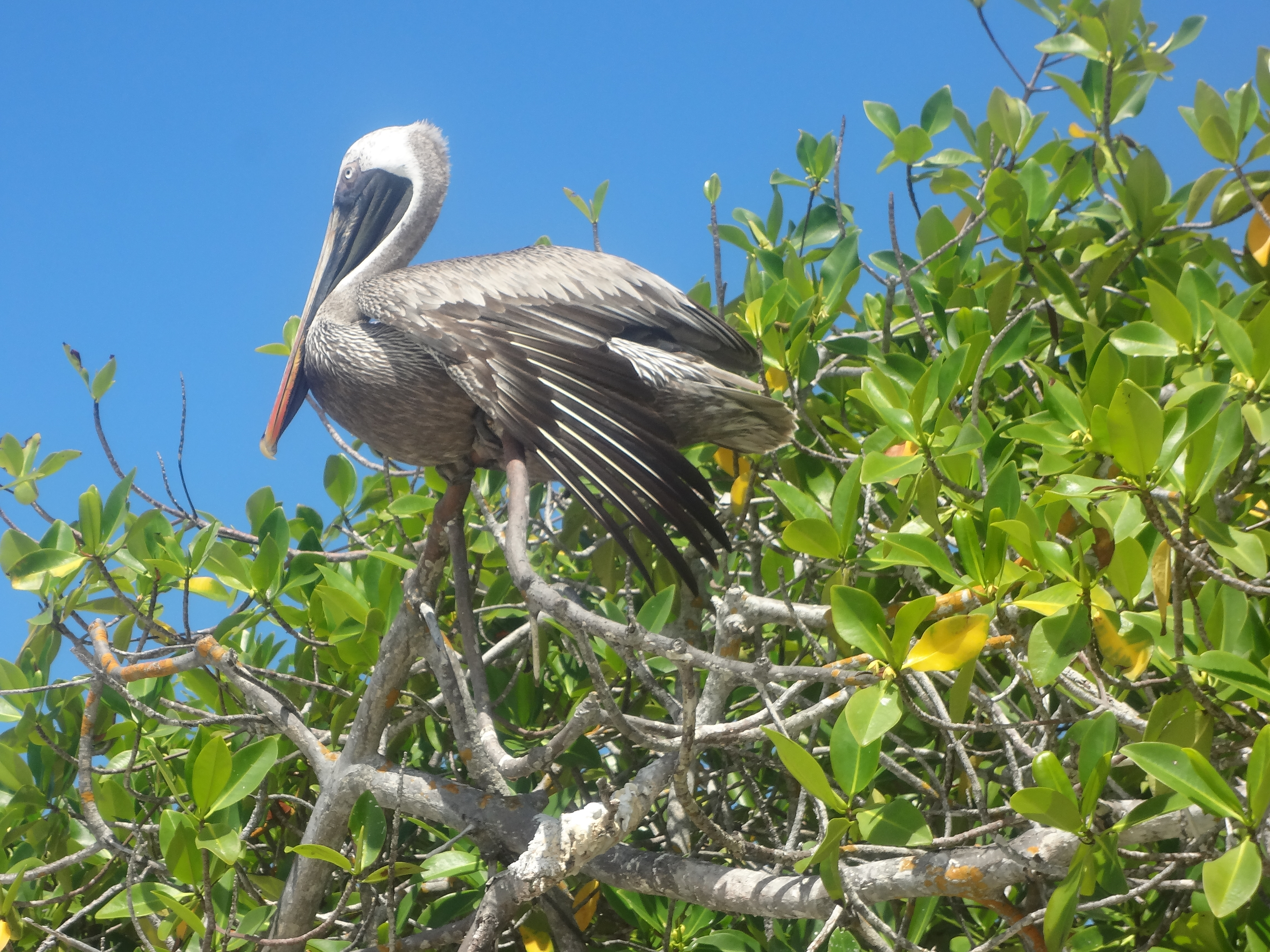
Brown pelican (Pelecanus occidentalis), Tortuga Bay

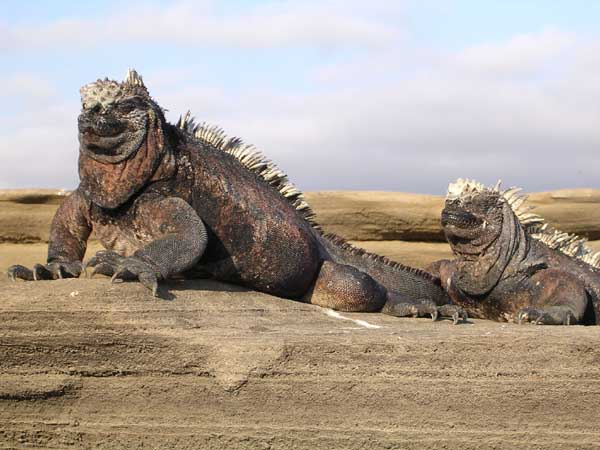
Marine iguana

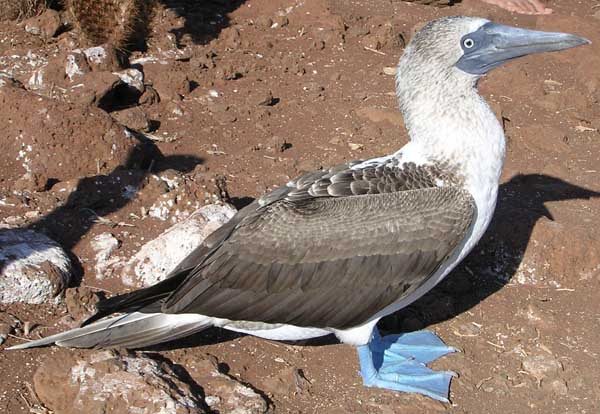
Blue-footed booby

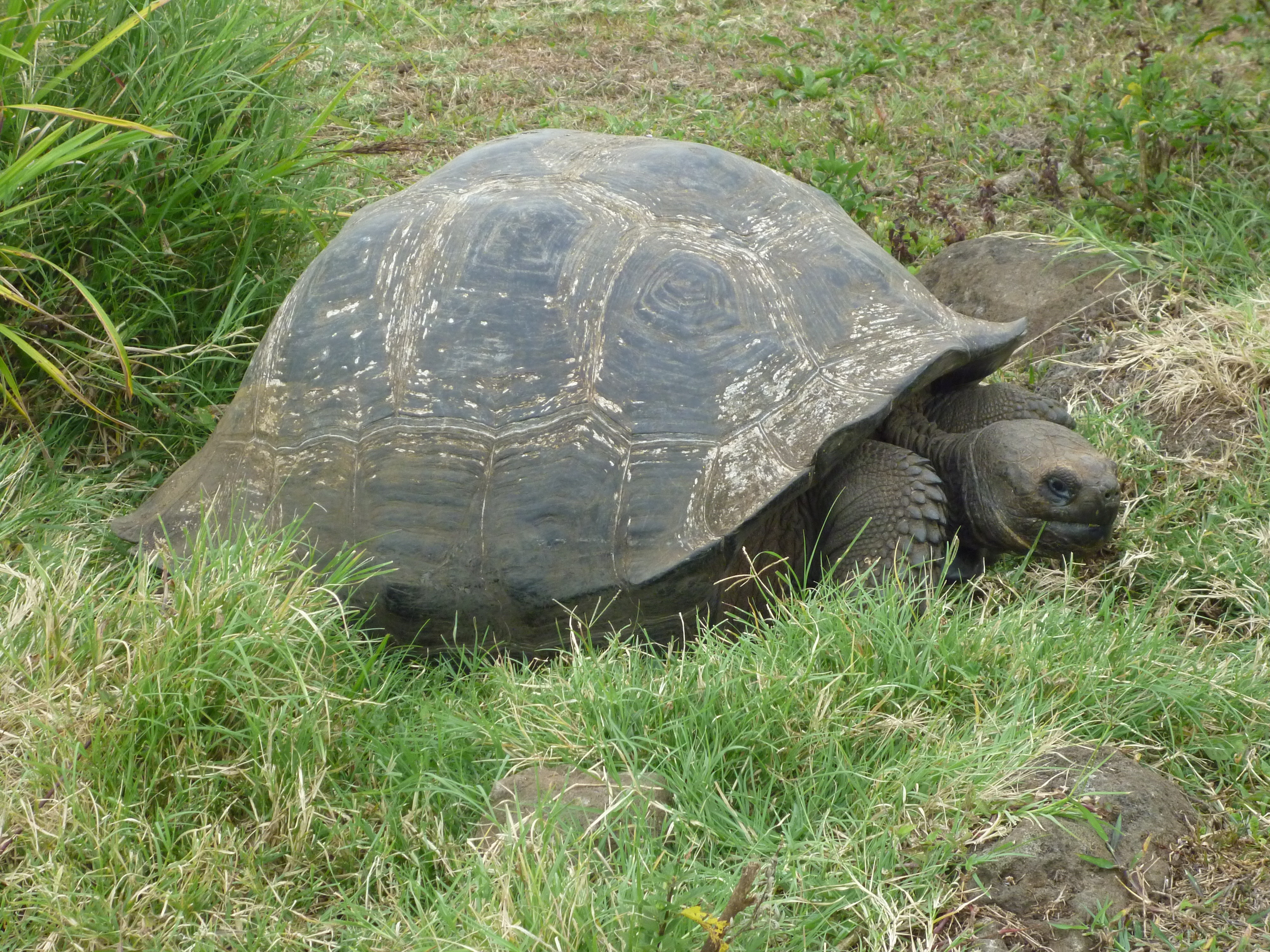
Galápagos tortoise on Santa Cruz Island

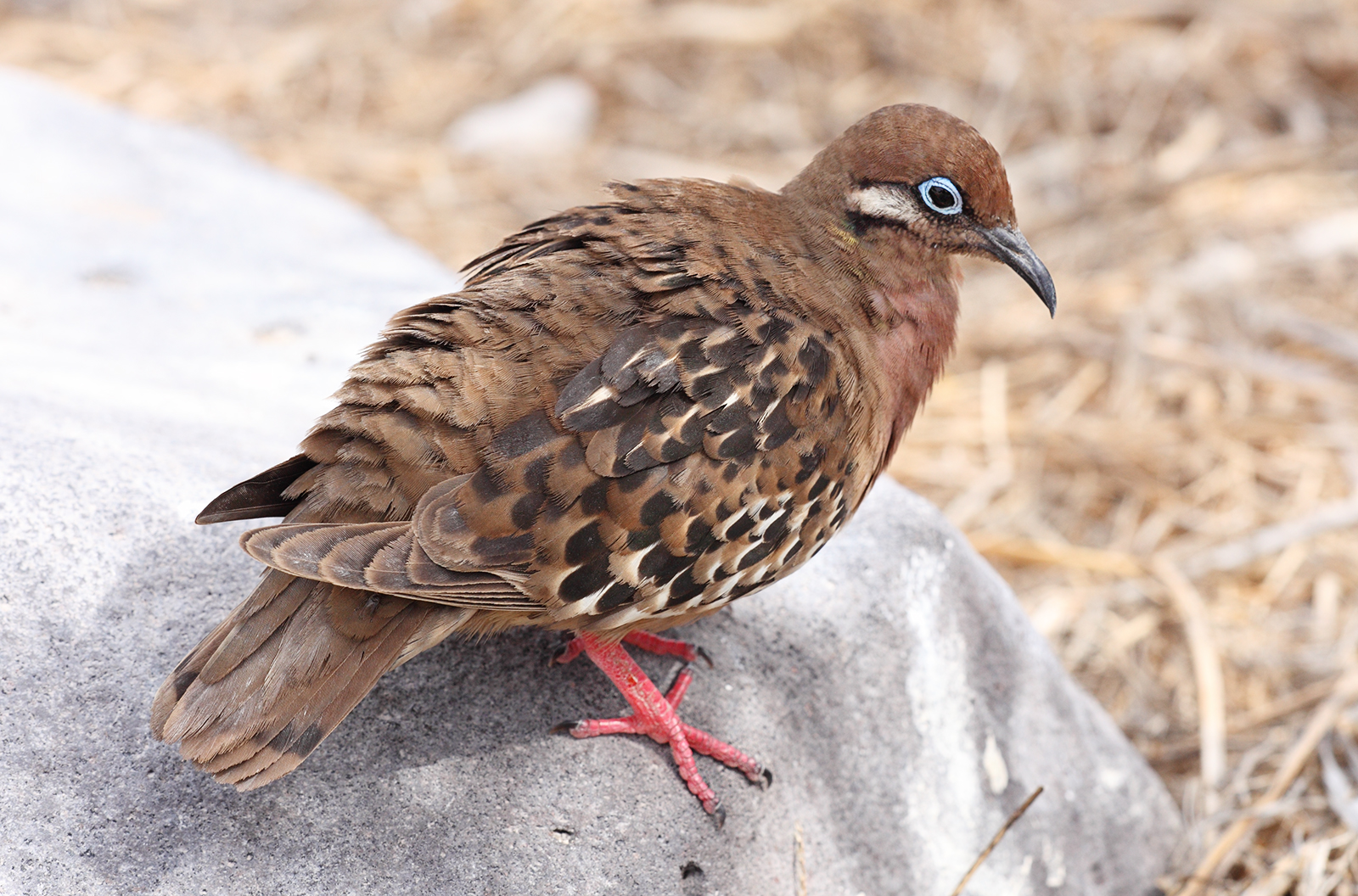
Galápagos dove on Española Island

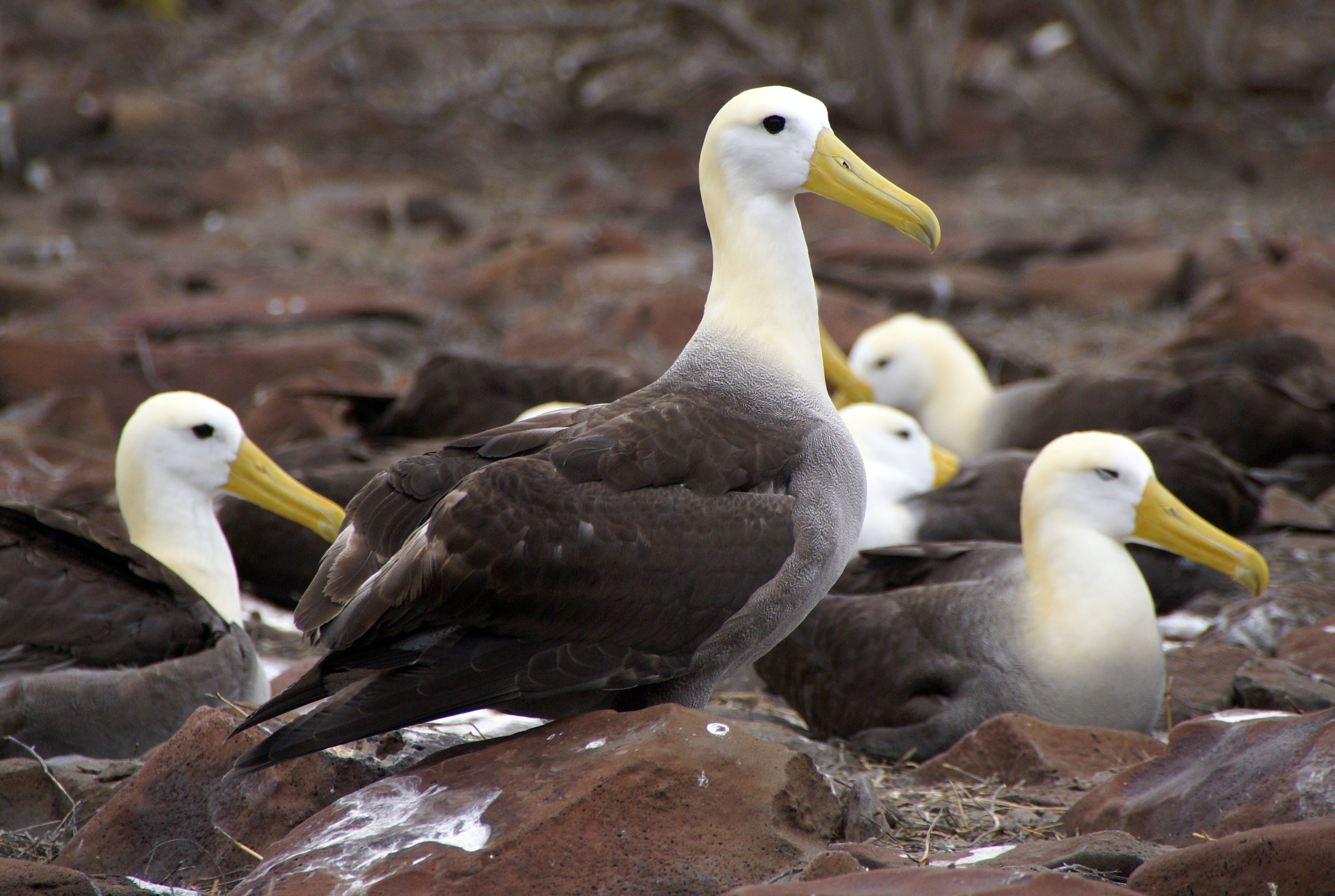
Waved albatrosses on Española

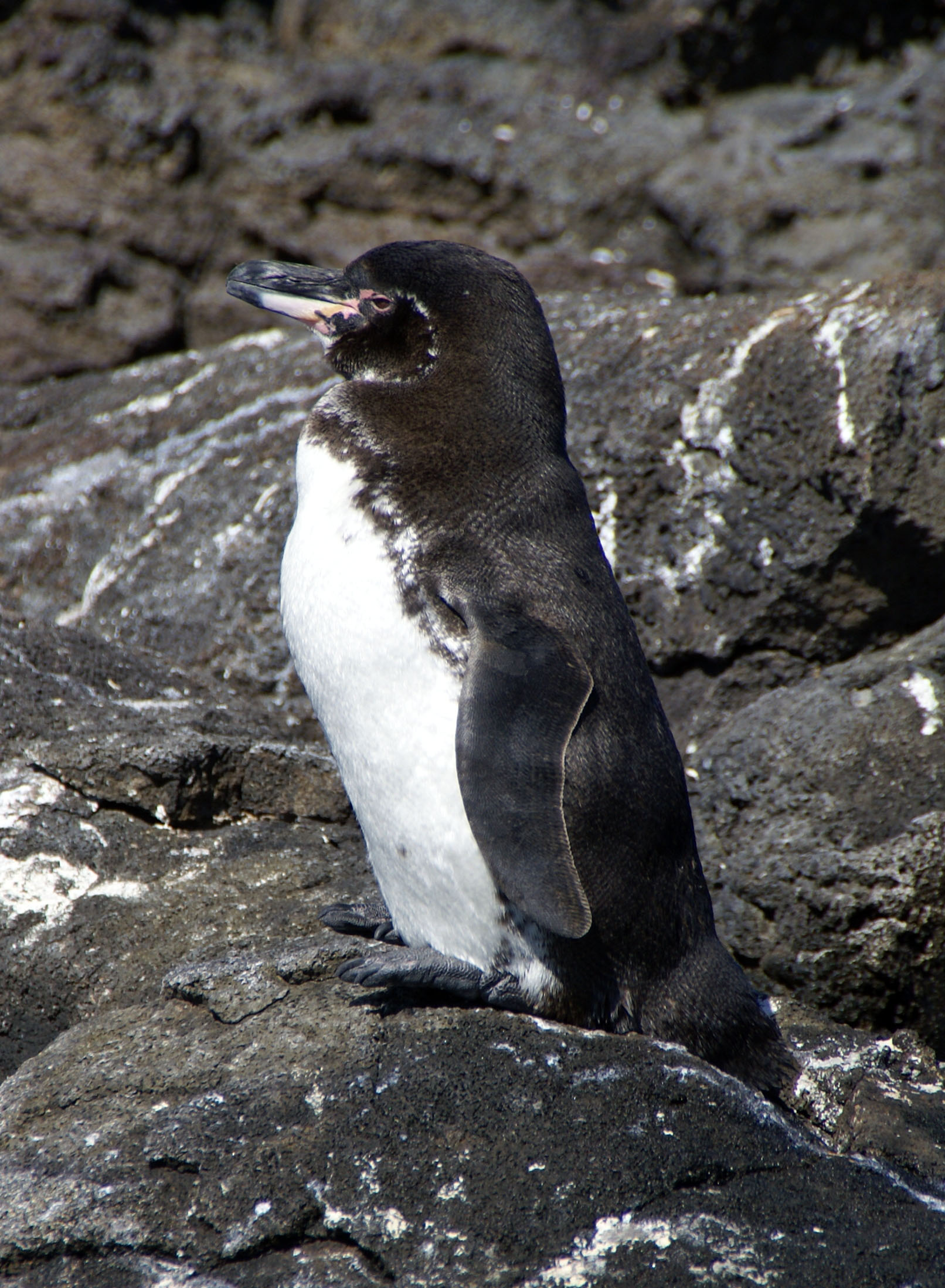
Galápagos penguin on Bartolomé Island

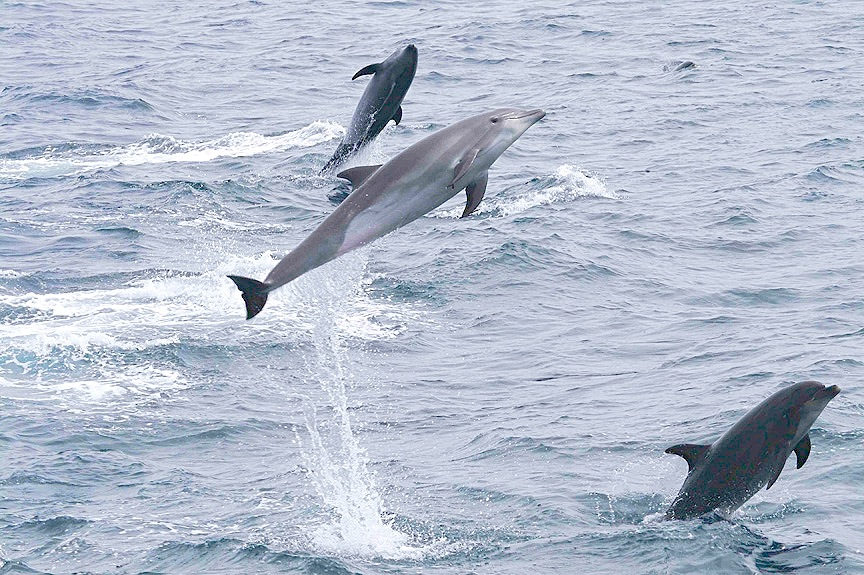
Bottlenose dolphins jumping offshore of the islands

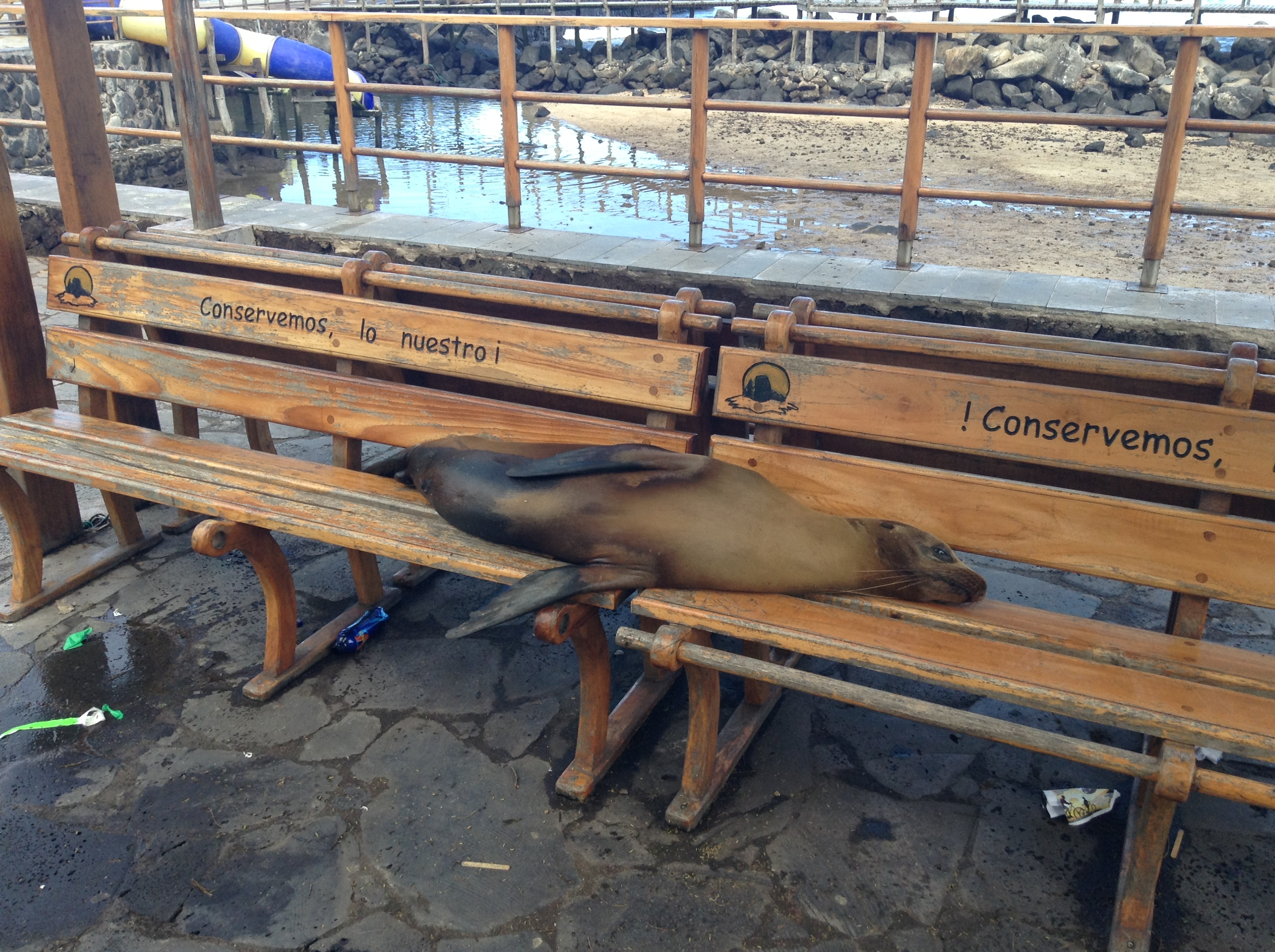
Adult Galápagos sea lion resting on a park bench in Puerto Baquerizo Moreno

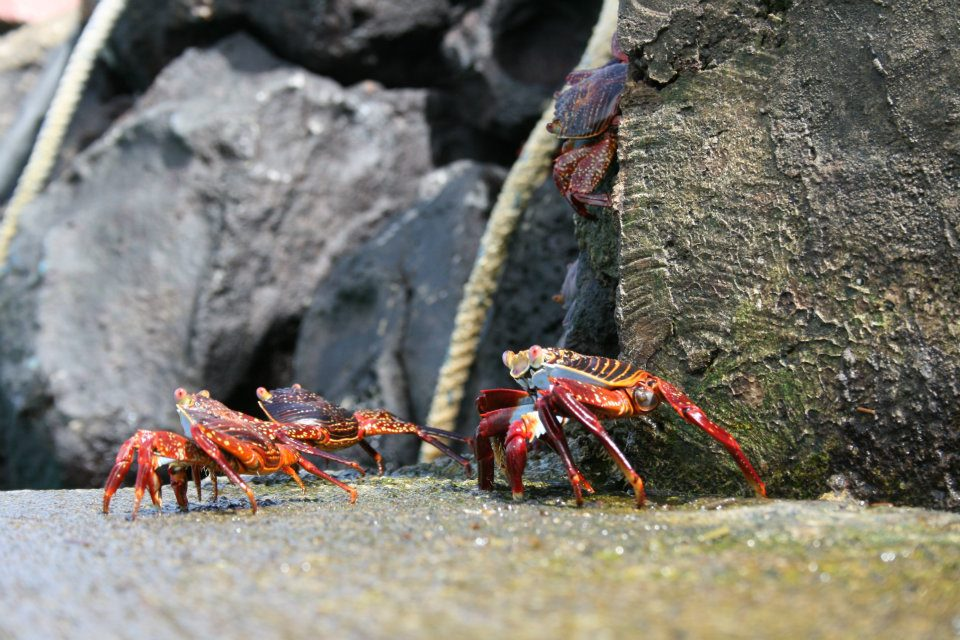
Grapsus grapsus on the rocks

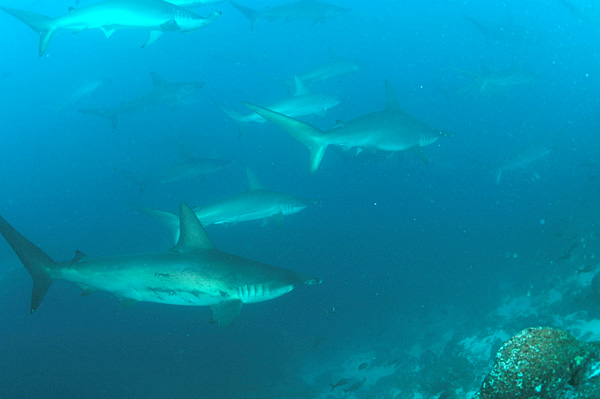
School of scalloped hammerheads off Wolf Island

Though the first protective legislation for the Galápagos was enacted in 1930 and supplemented in 1936, it was not until the late 1950s that positive action was taken to control what was happening to the native flora and fauna. In 1955, the International Union for the Conservation of Nature organized a fact-finding mission to the Galápagos. Two years later, in 1957, UNESCO, in cooperation with the government of Ecuador, sent another expedition to study the conservation situation and choose a site for a research station.

In 1959, the centenary year of Charles Darwin's publication of The Origin of Species, the Ecuadorian government declared 97.5% of the archipelago's land area a national park, excepting areas already colonised. The Charles Darwin Foundation (CDF) was founded the same year. The core responsibility of CDF, an international nongovernmental organization (NGO) constituted in Belgium, is to conduct research and provide the research findings to the government for effective management of Galápagos. CDF's research efforts began with the establishment of the Charles Darwin Research Station on Santa Cruz Island in 1964. During the early years, conservation programs, such as eradication of introduced species and protection of native species, were carried out by research station personnel. Now much of that work is accomplished by the Galápagos National Park Service using the research findings and methodologies developed by CDF.

In 1986, the 70,000 square kilometers (27,000 sq mi) of ocean surrounding the islands was declared a marine reserve, second in size only to Australia's Great Barrier Reef. In 1990, the archipelago became a whale sanctuary. UNESCO recognized the islands in 1978 as a World Heritage Site and in 1985, as a biosphere reserve. This was later extended in December 2001 to include the marine reserve. In July 2010, the World Heritage Committee agreed to remove the Galápagos Islands from its list of precious sites endangered by environmental threats or overuse.

Conservation International Ecuador has served as the project agency for a Global Environment Facility project in the Galápagos designed to strengthen archipelago biosecurity and support ecosystem restoration. Actions have included invasive-vertebrate eradication on Floreana Island and translocation of giant tortoises to Santa Fe Island.

Noteworthy species include:

- Galápagos dove, Zenaida galapagoensis, two subspecies
- Galápagos flycatcher, Myiarchus magnirostris
- Galápagos land iguanas, Conolophus spp.
- Marine iguana, Amblyrhynchus cristatus, the only iguana feeding in the sea
- Galápagos rice rat Aegialomys galapagoensis, the only native endemic terrestrial mammal
- Galápagos tortoise (Galápagos giant tortoise), Chelonoidis nigra, known as galápago in Spanish, it gave the name to the islands
- Galápagos green turtle, Chelonia mydas agassisi, a subspecies of the green turtle
- Galápagos racer, Pseudalsophis biserialis, an endemic species of snake with two subspecies
- Sea cucumbers, the cause of environmental battles with fishermen over quotas of this expensive Asian delicacy
- Flightless cormorant, Phalacrocorax harrisi
- Great frigatebird and magnificent frigatebird
- Blue-footed booby, Sula nebouxii, popular among visitors for their large blue feet which they show off in courtship
- Galápagos penguin, Spheniscus mendiculus, the only living tropical penguin
- Waved albatross, Phoebastria irrorata, the only living tropical albatross
- Galápagos hawk, Buteo galapagoensis, the islands' main scavenger (at the top of the food chain) and "environmental police"
- Four endemic species of Galápagos mockingbirds, the first species Darwin noticed to vary from island to island
- Thirteen endemic species of tanagers, popularly called Darwin's finches. Among them is the sharp-beaked ground finch Geospiza difficilis septentrionalis which is sometimes called the "vampire finch" for its blood-sucking habits, and the tool-using woodpecker finch, Camarhynchus pallidus
- Galápagos sea lions, Zalophus wollebaeki, closely related to the California sea lion, but smaller
- Two endemic genera of cacti, each with a single species: Jasminocereus thouarsii, the candelabra cactus, and Brachycereus nesioticus, the lava cactus

=== Environmental threats ===
Introduced plants and animals, such as feral goats, cats, and cattle, brought accidentally or willingly to the islands by humans, represent the main threat to Galápagos. Quick to reproduce and with no natural predators, these alien species decimated the habitats of native species. The native animals, lacking natural predators on the islands, are defenseless to introduced predators.

There are over 700 introduced plant species today. There are only 500 native and endemic species. This difference is creating a major problem for the islands and the natural species that inhabit them. These plants have invaded large areas and eliminated endemic species in the humid zones of San Cristobal, Floreana, Isabela and Santa Cruz. Some of the most harmful introduced plants are the guayaba or guava (Psidium guajava), avocado (Persea americana), cascarilla (Cinchona pubescens), balsa (Ochroma pyramidale), hill raspberry (Rubus niveus), various citrus (orange, grapefruit, lemon), floripondio, higuerilla (Ricinus communis) trees and the elephant grass, Pennisetum purpureum.

Many species were introduced to the Galápagos by pirates. Thor Heyerdahl quoted documents that mention the Viceroy of Peru, knowing that British pirates ate the goats that they themselves had released in the islands, ordered dogs to be freed there to eliminate the goats. Also, when colonization of Floreana by José de Villamil failed, he ordered the goats, donkeys, cattle and other animals from the farms in Floreana be transferred to other islands for the purpose of later colonization.

The black rat (Rattus rattus) attacks small Galápagos tortoises when they leave the nest, so in Pinzón they stopped the reproduction for a period of more than 50 years; only adults were found on that island. Also, where the black rat is found, the endemic rat has disappeared. Cattle and donkeys eat all the available vegetation and compete with native species for scarce water. In 1959, fishermen introduced one male and two female goats to Pinta island; by 1973, the National Park service estimated the population of goats to be over 30,000 individuals. Goats were also introduced to Marchena in 1967 and to Rabida in 1971. A goat eradication program, however, cleared the goats from Pinta and Santiago and most of the goat population from Isabela, and, by 2006, all feral pigs, donkeys and non-sterile goats had been eliminated from Santiago and Isabela, the largest islands with the worst problems due to non-native mammals.

Six species of small non-native vertebrates have established self-sufficient populations in Galápagos and may become invasive: Fowler's snouted tree frog Scinax quinquefasciatus, common house gecko Hemidactylus frenatus, mourning gecko Lepidodactylus lugubris, dwarf gecko Gonatodes caudiscutatus, Peters' leaf-toed gecko Phyllodactylus reissii, and smooth-billed ani Crotophaga ani. Domestic fowl Gallus gallus holds feral populations, which may have self-sufficient populations, but evidence is unclear.

The fast-growing poultry industry on the inhabited islands has been cause for concern from local conservationists, who fear domestic birds could introduce disease into the endemic wild bird populations.

The Galápagos marine sanctuary is under threat from a host of illegal fishing activities, in addition to other problems of development. The most pressing threat to the Marine Reserve comes from local, mainland and foreign fishing targeting marine life illegally within the Reserve, such as sharks (hammerheads and other species) for their fins, and the harvest of sea cucumbers out of season. Development threatens both land and sea species. The growth of both the tourism industry and local populations fuelled by high birth rates and illegal immigration threaten the wildlife of the Archipelago. The grounding of the oil tanker Jessica in 2001 and the subsequent oil spill brought this threat to world attention.

In 2007, UNESCO put the Galápagos Islands on their List of World Heritage in Danger because of threats posed by invasive species, unbridled tourism and overfishing. On 29 July 2010, the World Heritage Committee decided to remove the Galápagos Islands from the list because the Committee found significant progress had been made by Ecuador in addressing these problems.

On 28 January 2008, Galápagos National Park official Victor Carrion announced 53 sea lions (13 pups, 25 youngsters, 9 males and 6 females) were killed at the Galápagos Islands nature reserve on Pinta, with their heads caved in. In 2001, poachers killed 35 male sea lions.

The Galápagos Islands were short-listed as a candidate to be one of the New7Wonders of Nature by the New7Wonders of Nature Foundation. As of February 2009, the archipelago was ranked first in Group B, the category for islands.

The islands' biodiversity is under threat from several sources. The human population is growing at a rate of 8% per year (1995). Introduced species have caused damage, and in 1996 a US$5 million, five-year eradication plan commenced in an attempt to rid the islands of introduced species such as goats, rats, deer, and donkeys. Except for the rats, the project was essentially completed in 2006. Rats have only been eliminated from the smaller Galápagos Islands of Rábida and Pinzón.

El Niño has adversely affected the marine ecosystem. In January 2001, an oil slick from a stranded tanker threatened the islands, but winds and shifting ocean currents helped disperse the oil before much damage was done. The devastating El Niño of 1982–83 saw almost six times as much rain as normal in the Galapagos and created a wildlife catastrophe. The 1997–98 El Niño adversely affected wildlife in the waters surrounding the islands, as the waters were 5 °C (9 °F) warmer than normal. Corals and barnacles suffered, hammerhead sharks were driven away, and most of the island's seabirds failed to breed in 1997–98. The mortality rate of marine iguanas rose as the green algae they feed on was replaced by inedible red algae. During the 1982–83 El Niño, 70% of the marine iguanas starved to death because of this.

== See also ==
- List of birds of the Galápagos Islands
- List of animals in the Galápagos Islands
- Galápagos National Park
- Galápagos hotspot
- Galápagos Islands xeric scrub
- Galápagos Province
- Darwin's Arch
- Johanna Angermeyer, author of various books featuring the Galápagos Islands
