= Nameless Island =

Islet in the Galápagos Archipelago

Coordinates: 0°40′S 90°36′W

Nameless Island (Spanish: Isla Sin Nombre) is an islet of the Galápagos Islands group, in Ecuador, between Pinzón Island and Santa Cruz Island (Galápagos). The island is most commonly used for scuba diving.
