= Isla Guy Fawkes =

Island group in the Galápagos Archipelago

Guy Fawkes Islands
Native name: Islas Guy Fawkes
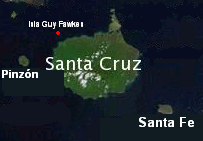

Geography
- Location: Galápagos Islands
- Coordinates: 0°30′55.69″S 90°31′37.90″W

Administration
- Ecuador

Demographics
- Population: Uninhabited

Guy Fawkes Island (Spanish: Isla Guy Fawkes), properly the Guy Fawkes Islands (Islas Guy Fawkes), is an island group composed of two crescent-shaped islets—North Guy Fawkes I. (I. Guy Fawkes Norte) and South Guy Fawkes I. (I. Guy Fawkes Sud)—and two rocks located northwest of Santa Cruz Island in the Galápagos Archipelago in Ecuador. The group is uninhabited but sometimes visited by scuba divers.

William Beebe visited the islands and makes mention of them in his book Galapagos: World's End. He described the cliffs—made of stratified layers of volcanic tuff—as majestic and also noted a population of sea lions.

The island is perhaps best known for its name, honoring the English Catholic revolutionary Guy Fawkes, who attempted to blow up Parliament in 1605.

== Gallery ==
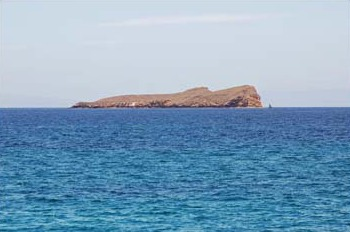
North Guy Fawkes Island from the direction of Santa Cruz

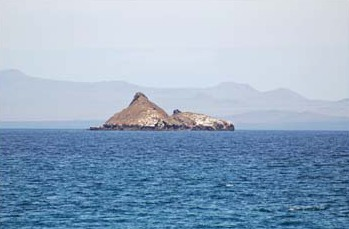
South Guy Fawkes Island from the direction of Santa Cruz
