= The Empress of Floreana =

1934 silent adventure short film

- Directed by: Emery Johnson
- Written by: Baroness Von Wagner; Captain George Allan Hancock
- Starring: Baroness Von Wagner; Robert Philippson
- Cinematography: Charles Sweat
- Release date: 1934
- Running time: 4 minutes
- Languages: Silent film (English intertitles)

The Empress of Floreana is a 1934 silent adventure short film made on Floreana Island by a millionaire captain who originally came with a crew to visit the Galápagos Islands for purposes of zoology. The crew chose to visit Floreana because of the rumors that surrounded the island's only two inhabitants, a German diaspora couple Friedrich Ritter and Dore Strauch, who immediately befriended them to the point where the crew wanted to return every few months with gifts of provisions for their hosts. Upon their second visit, they learned that two more groups joined the island: a family of three with another on the way; and Eloise von Wagner Bosquet, an imperious, self-described baroness who was accompanied by two younger gigolos, Robert and Rudolf, whom she introduced as the architect and engineer of a grand hotel she hoped to build on the island against her fellow islanders' wishes. Von Wagner's charm proved to be so promising, that Captain George Allan Hancock would write a film about her and film it upon their third visit. On January 21, 1934, the crew returned with film equipment to capture the planned production, with many of the ship's members standing in as cast and film crew.

The film follows a newlywed couple (director Emery Johnson filled in as the husband, while male student zoologist Ray Elliott played the wife) who find themselves stranded on the shores of Floreana Island. The eponymous character (von Wagner) and her swain (played by Philippson, one of her real life lovers) are the only people on the island, and they have other plans for the helpless couple.

The film is notable for being featured in The Galapagos Affair, and helping publicize Floreana and the Galápagos back in the early 1930s. Some of the footage is also featured in the closing credits of Eden (2024 film), director Ron Howard's 2024 version of the story.

== Cast ==
- Eloise von Wagner Bosquet as The Piratess (as Baroness von Wagner)
- Robert Philippson as Her Swain
- Emery Johnson as Her Paramour (uncredited director cameo)
- Ray Elliott as unnamed female (uncredited)

== See also ==
- The Galapagos Affair
- Eden (2024 film)
