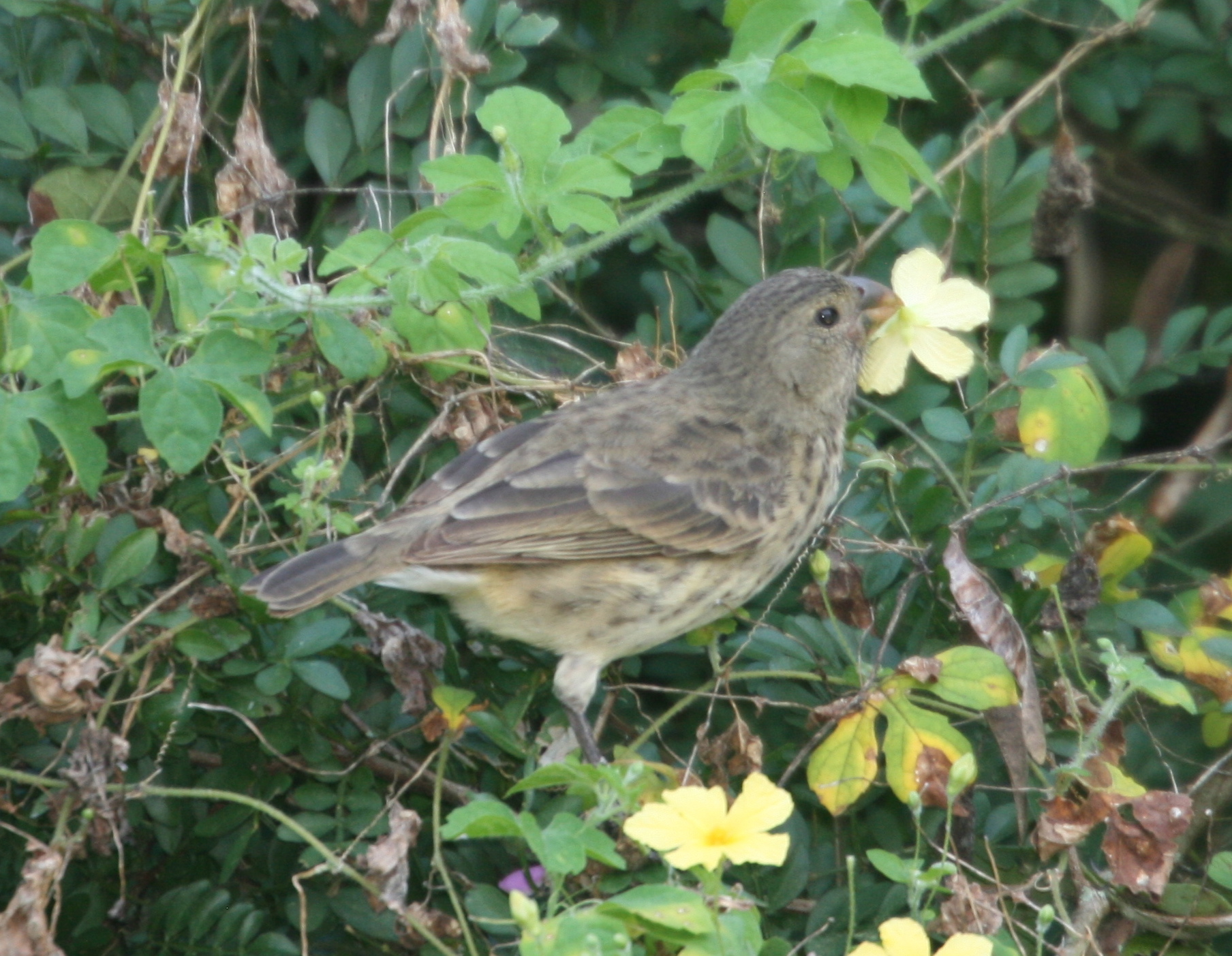
- Female

Conservation status
- Least Concern (IUCN 3.1)

Scientific classification
- Kingdom: Animalia
- Phylum: Chordata
- Class: Aves
- Order: Passeriformes
- Family: Thraupidae
- Genus: Platyspiza; Ridgway, 1897
- Species: P. crassirostris

Binomial name
- Platyspiza crassirostris (Gould, 1837)

Synonyms
- Camarhynchus crassirostris (Gould, 1837); Camarhynchus variegatus (Sclater & Salvin, 1870)

= Vegetarian finch =

Species of bird

The vegetarian finch (Platyspiza crassirostris) is a species of bird in the Darwin's finch group of the tanager family Thraupidae endemic to the Galápagos Islands. It is the only member of the genus Platyspiza.

== Taxonomy ==
The vegetarian finch is one of Darwin's finches, a group of closely related birds that evolved on the Galápagos Islands. The group is related to the yellow-faced grassquit (Tiaris olivaceus) which is found in South and Central America and the Caribbean. An ancestral relative of the grassquit arrived on the Galápagos Islands some 2–3 million years ago, and the vegetarian finch is an early evolutionary radiation from that ancestor.

When Darwin first collected the species in 1835, he assumed it was a finch. John Gould, who formally described the vegetarian finch in 1837, placed it in a new genus Camarhynchus and coined the binomial name Camarhynchus crassirostris. The vegetarian finch is now placed in the genus Platyspiza that was introduced by Robert Ridgway in 1897. Molecular phylogenetic studies have shown that Darwin's "finches" are actually members of the subfamily Coerebinae within the large tanager family Thraupidae.

The vegetarian finch is the sole member of the genus Platyspiza, which some taxonomists still subsume into the genus Camarhynchus.

== Etymology ==
The genus name Platyspiza comes from the Greek platus, meaning "broad" and spiza, meaning "finch". The specific name crassirostris comes from the Latin crassus, meaning "heavy" or "thick" and rostris, meaning "-billed" (rostrum = bill). The "vegetarian" of its common name refers to its primary diet.

== Description ==
The vegetarian finch is one of the largest Galápagos finches, measuring 16 cm (6.3 in) in length (Note: By convention, length is measured from the tip of the bill to the tip of the tail on a dead bird (or skin) laid on its back.) and ranging from 29 to 40 g (1.0 to 1.4 oz) in mass. Its upright stance is described as "parrot-like". Its beak is broad and stout, with a strongly curved culmen. Males have upper parts which are olive-colored, with underparts that are whitish, with smudgy streaking on the lower breast and flanks; some birds show rufous on the underparts. Their lower flanks and undertail coverts are buffy, with a black hood, throat, breast and upper flanks. Their iris is dark, and the bill is black in the breeding season and horn-colored during the rest of the year. Females are principally brown above and off-white below, with a buffy rump and flanks streaked with brown on the face, crown, upperparts, throat, breast and flanks, and show two indistinct buffy wingbars on the brown wings. Their beak is two-toned; the upper mandible ranges in color from dusky brown to black, while the lower mandible is dull orange or dull pink. The immature male is intermediate in appearance between the adult male and the adult female; it appears blackish on the face and throat, but is more streaked below than the adult male.

=== Voice ===
The song of the vegetarian finch is nasal and drawn out, with each note lasting about two seconds. Transcribed as ph'wheeeuuuuu-íííúúú, it is accented towards the end. The bird's primary call is high-pitched and squealing, said to resemble the sound of a radio tuner. It also gives a whiny pheep.

== Range and habitat ==
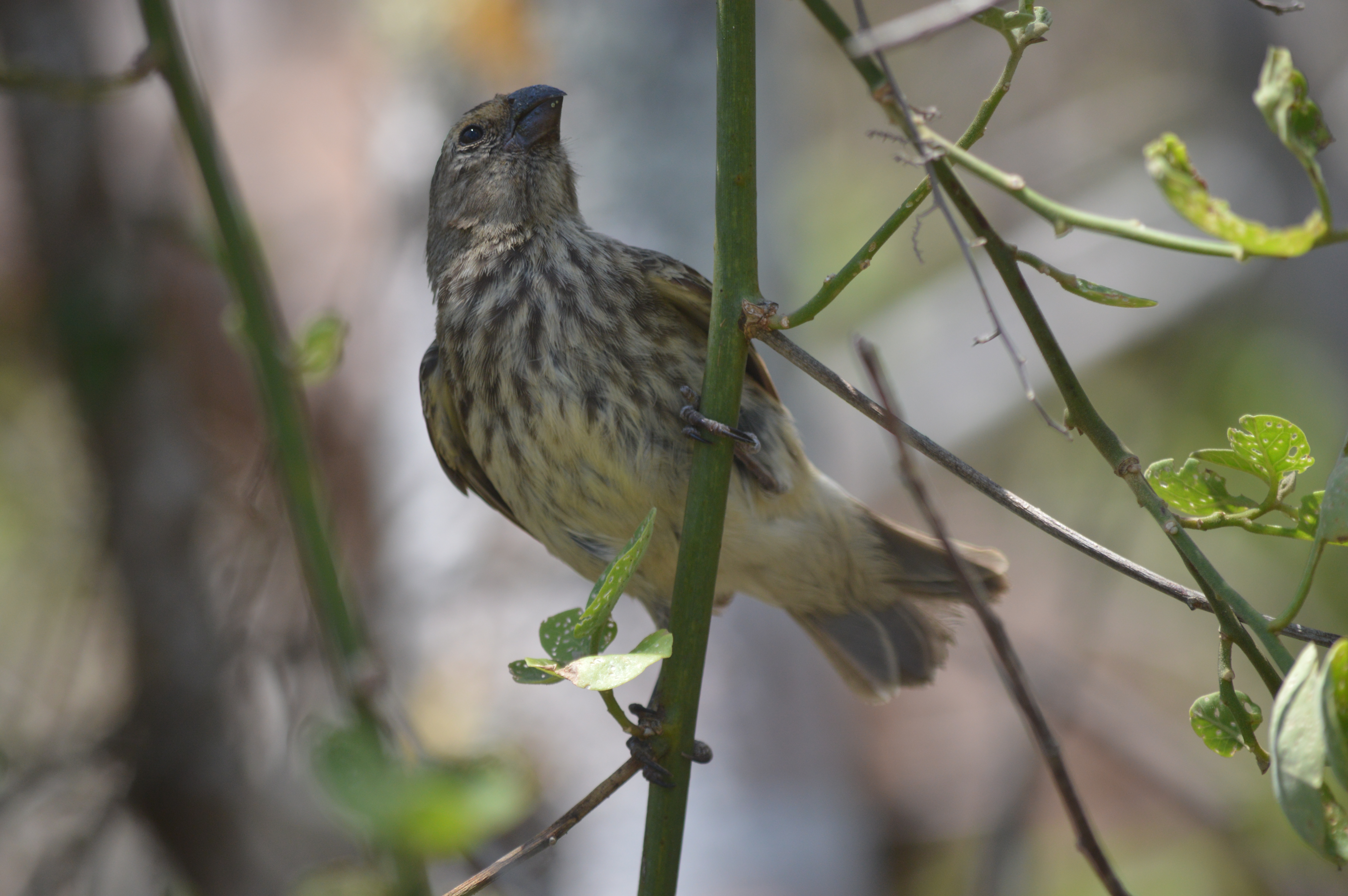
Vegetarian finch on Santa Cruz Island

Endemic to the Galápagos, the vegetarian finch is found on seven islands: San Cristóbal, Santa Cruz, Isabela, Marchena, Santiago, Pinta and Fernandina. It is found from 0 to 500 m (0 to 1,640 ft) above sea level. Although it is most common in montane evergreen forest, particularly the transition zone, its range also extends up into the humid zone and down into the arid zone. Although the vegetarian finch was previously found on Pinzón, Santa Fé, and Floreana, the species is now extirpated from these islands. On Floreana, the species was rarely observed in the second half of the 20th century, with the last reported sightings of single individuals in the agricultural zone in 2004 and at Cerro Pajas in 2008.

== Behavior ==
=== Breeding ===
Little is known about the breeding ecology of this species. It breeds primarily in the wet season, building a grassy domed nest with a side entrance. Courtship feeding is known to occur throughout courtship and incubation, with some pairs passing food items back and forth several times.

=== Feeding ===
The vegetarian finch is largely a plant-eater. It feeds primarily on buds, leaves, flowers and fruit, and will strip the bark off twigs to get to the cambium and phloem which lies underneath. Although it forages mainly in trees, it will descend to the ground to search for fallen fruits and young plant shoots. It also occasionally eats caterpillars. It feeds primarily at mid-levels, in what has been described as a "rather leisurely" manner. Because its principal food items are soft, the vegetarian finch has a beak morphology unlike those of Darwin's finches which specialize on hard seeds. Described as "parrot-like", the beak is small and stout, with a steep profile and a strong curve in the upper mandible. Its primary function is food manipulation at the tip, rather than seed crushing at the base. The vegetarian finch has a disproportionately large gizzard for its size, as well as a long intestine and a disproportionately small heart. These allow it to process the "relatively indigestible" leaves and buds that make up a large proportion of its diet.

== Conservation and threats ==
Although the vegetarian finch is uncommon, it is widespread across the Galápagos Islands. Its numbers appear to be stable, though they have not been quantified. The International Union for Conservation of Nature lists it as a species of Least Concern, as neither its population size nor its range size approach thresholds for concern. Like all endemic wildlife on the Galápagos Islands, though, it is impacted by some human activities. Fires, overgrazing by domestic and feral animals, and the introduction of exotic species are among the most serious threats it faces. It is found in seven of the important bird areas established on the islands.
