= Margret Wittmer =

Floreana Island settler

- Born: Margret Walbroel; 12 July 1904; Cologne, Germany
- Died: March 21, 2000 (aged 95); Floreana Island, Ecuador
- Spouse: Heinz Wittmer
- Children: 2

Margret Wittmer (née Walbroel; 12 July 1904 – 21 March 2000) was a German woman who was an early colonist of Floreana Island. Her experiences living on the island were documented in her 1959 biography Postlagernd Floreana: Ein außergewöhnliches Frauenleben am Ende der Welt (lit. Post Office Floreana: An Extraordinary Woman's Life at the End of the World), published in English as Floreana: A Woman's Pilgrimage to the Galapagos.

== Biography ==
Wittmer was born in Cologne on 12 July 1904, the daughter of Eva (née Leuchtenberg) and Johannes Walbroel, a goldsmith.

She wrote about her experiences of being an early settler in the book Postlagernd Floreana. Erlebnisbericht deutscher Siedler (1959) (English title: Floreana: A Woman's Pilgrimage to the Galapagos). She returned to Germany in 1960 to present her book.

In late March 1934, Wittmer said that Eloise von Wagner-Bosquet told her that American friends had arrived by yacht and that she and Robert Philippson were leaving Floreana immediately for the South Seas. Other settlers did not report seeing the yacht, and Wagner-Bosquet and Philippson were never seen again.

Margret's book attracted more German tourists to Floreana Island. She built several bungalows to host different tourists and scientists that visited Floreana. The family's Wittmer Lodge still operates on the island.

== Personal life and death ==
Wittmer, her husband Heinz, and his son, Harry, from a previous marriage, moved to Floreana Island in 1932, following the arrival of German doctor Friedrich Ritter and his wife, Dore Strauch. Wittmer was in the fourth month of her first pregnancy when they arrived, and she gave birth to a son, Rolf, and a daughter, Ingeborg, while living on the island.

Wittmer remained on Floreana Island for most of the remainder of her life, though she returned to Germany twice, once in 1935, and again in 1960 to present her book Floreana: A Woman's Pilgrimage to the Galapagos.

Wittmer died on 21 March 2000, at the age of 95. She was buried on Floreana Island, next to her husband Heinz, who died in 1963.

Margaret's stepson Harry died in a boating accident in 1951. Son Rolf innovated Galápagos’ ecotourism industry by setting up a tour boat company, Rolf Wittmer Turismo, Ltd, and is remembered with the Rolf Wittmer Foundation.

As of 2017, the family's Wittmer Lodge on Floreana was still being operated by Margret's daughter, Ingeborg, and her daughter Erika.

== In popular culture ==
Actress Diane Kruger portrayed Wittmer in the 2013 documentary The Galapagos Affair. Sydney Sweeney portrays Wittmer in the 2024 film Eden.

== Sources ==
- Wittmer, Margret (1989). Floreana: A Woman's Pilgrimage to the Galapagos. Translated by Nelson, Anthony. Avon, England: The Bath Press. ISBN 978-1-559-21001-0.
- Woram, John (June 1, 2005). Charles Darwin Slept Here: Tales of Human History at World's End. Rockville Center, New York: Rockville Press, Inc. ISBN 978-0-976-93360-1.
