= Noah Pink =

Canadian screenwriter

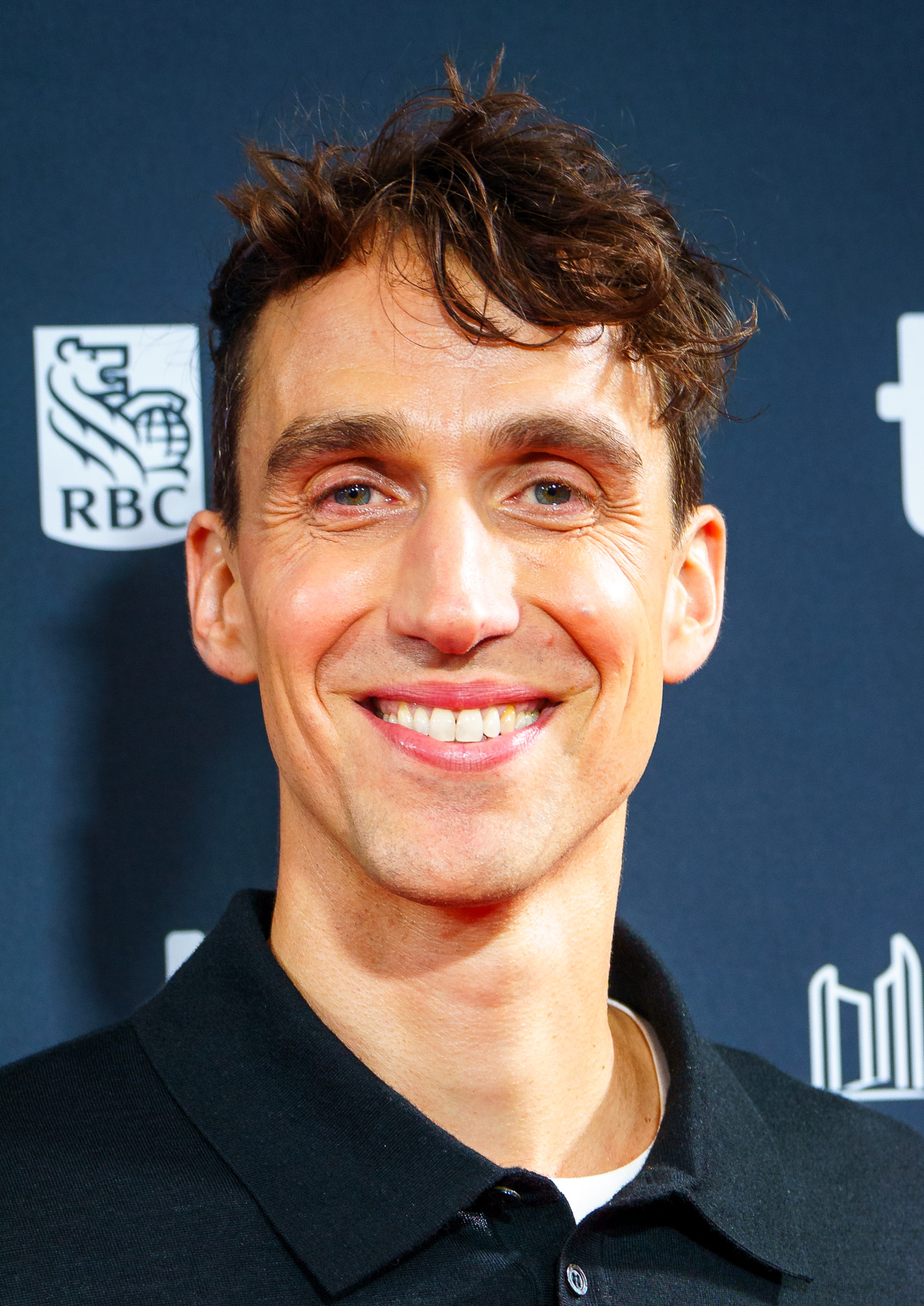
- Noah Pink in 2024
- Born: Halifax, Nova Scotia, Canada
- Education: University of Pennsylvania ('05)
- Occupations: Screenwriter, television producer, director

Noah Pink is a Canadian screenwriter, television producer, and director. He created the television series Genius for National Geographic, and wrote the screenplay Tetris for Apple TV+. His low-budget feature novella, Zedcrew, debuted at the 2010 Director's Fortnight at the Cannes Film Festival. He also competed for Canada in swimming at the 2001 Maccabiah Games in Israel.

== Early life ==
Pink was born in Halifax, Nova Scotia, Canada. He attended Halifax Grammar School. He then attended the University of Pennsylvania, where he was a member of the Men's Swimming Team, and graduated in 2005.

He competed for Canada in swimming at the 2001 Maccabiah Games in Israel.

== Filmography ==
Short film

- Bad Day Good Day Bad Day (2008)
- Zedcrew (2010)

Television

Year	Title	Writer	Executive Producer	Notes
2017–2021	Genius	Yes	Yes	Wrote 4 episodes

Film writer

- Tetris (2023) (Also executive producer)
- Eden (2024)
