= Eden (2024 film) =

2024 American film by Ron Howard

- Theatrical release poster
- Directed by: Ron Howard
- Screenplay by: Noah Pink
- Story by: Noah Pink; Ron Howard
- Produced by: Ron Howard; Brian Grazer; Karen Lunder; Stuart Ford; Bill Connor; Patrick Newall
- Starring: Jude Law; Ana de Armas; Vanessa Kirby; Daniel Brühl; Sydney Sweeney; Toby Wallace; Felix Kammerer
- Cinematography: Mathias Herndl
- Edited by: Matt Villa
- Music by: Hans Zimmer
- Production companies: Imagine Entertainment; AGC Studios; Library Pictures International; Medan Productions
- Distributed by: Vertical
- Release dates: September 7, 2024 (TIFF); August 22, 2025 (United States)
- Running time: 130 minutes
- Country: United States
- Language: English
- Budget: $55 million (gross); $35 million (net)
- Box office: $2.8 million

Eden is a 2024 American historical survival thriller film directed by Ron Howard and written by Noah Pink, from a story by the pair. It stars Jude Law, Ana de Armas, Vanessa Kirby, Daniel Brühl, and Sydney Sweeney. The film is based on the true story of several European settlers, including Margret Wittmer, who arrive on the isolated Floreana Island, in the Galápagos Islands, Ecuador, pre-World War II, hoping to start a life there.

The film premiered at the Toronto International Film Festival on September 7, 2024, and was released theatrically in Germany on April 2, 2025, by Leonine, and in the United States by Vertical on August 22, 2025. The film received mixed reviews from critics.

== Plot ==
Friedrich Ritter and Dore Strauch flee their native Germany in 1931, repudiating the bourgeois values they believe are corroding humankind. On the isle of Floreana in the Galápagos Islands, Friedrich focuses on writing his manifesto, while Dore resolves to cure her multiple sclerosis through meditation. Their solitude, however, is short-lived.

They are joined by fellow Germans Margret and Heinz Wittmer, along with Heinz's young son, Harry. Shortly after arriving, Margret learns she is pregnant. The Wittmers swiftly prove to be earnest, capable settlers. Some time later, Eloise Bosquet de Wagner Wehrhorn arrives, a manipulative and vainglorious self-described baroness, accompanied by two devoted lovers: Robert and Rudolph, along with Manuel, an Ecuadorian servant. Eloise explains her plan to build a lavish hotel on Floreana, and she proves to be a nuisance to Ritter, Dore, and the Wittmers.

Eloise sets up a rudimentary encampment near where the Wittmers have painstakingly built a house and spends most of her time engaging in hedonistic behavior, lounging, drinking, and having sex with Robert and Rudolph, both of whom she exerts significant influence over. Due to their lack of planning and restraint, they soon run out of food rations. When Margret is left alone one day, she goes into labor, giving birth to a son while fighting off a pack of feral dogs. During the birth, Manuel and Robert raid the Wittmers' home for canned goods at Eloise's instruction. Margret becomes ill after the birth, and her husband persuades Friedrich to help her. He removes her trapped placenta, and she recovers.

Eloise holds an ostentatious luncheon for the group to celebrate the birth of the Wittmers' son, presenting her guests with the Wittmers' stolen food. She antagonizes the two couples by insulting Heinz, saying that Margret only married him, "because he asked," and humiliating Dore by pointing out her desire and inability to have children. Friedrich and Dore attempt to leave the heated argument, but Eloise draws a pistol and reveals the governor of the Galapagos has granted her 2,500 acres of land to build her resort. Later, American industrialist Allan Hancock visits the island and films the settlers for a documentary he is making. Eloise, aiming to charm and manipulate Hancock for his Hollywood connections, unsuccessfully attempts to seduce him before he and his crew depart.

Friedrich begins to exhibit desperation and an impulse for violence, defying the values he has espoused to Dore. Meanwhile, Rudolph grows to despise Eloise, but she manipulates him into tricking Heinz into accidentally shooting Dore's beloved donkey one night. Realizing Eloise's manipulation, Friedrich and Heinz confront her and Robert, along with Rudolph, who has aligned with Friedrich and the Wittmers. A fight breaks out, during which Heinz stabs Robert to death before Friedrich kills Eloise with a rifle. They dispose of their bodies in the ocean and concoct a story suggesting the two departed on a boat for Tahiti. Margret and Dore are suspicious of Friedrich and Heinz's story.

Dore's condition worsens, and tensions rise between her and Friedrich as she comes to resent him for betraying their values. While walking, she comes upon Margret, who gifts her extra chickens. Dore explains that their own animals have fallen ill from rotten food, and Margret pointedly warns her against eating contaminated meat, as food poisoning can be fatal. Taking this advice, Dore prepares a meal for Friedrich after which he falls ill and dies in agony, cursing her with his last breath. Shortly after, Ecuadorian authorities arrive to investigate, having received letters sent by Friedrich in which he attempted to frame Heinz for Eloise's and Robert's disappearances. However, Margret shields Heinz from suspicion during her questioning, pointing to the suspicious nature of Friedrich's death. Dore eventually leaves the island with the Ecuadorians, but the Wittmers insist on remaining alone.

Intertitles reveal that Dore returned to Germany, where she died of multiple sclerosis in 1943, shortly after publishing a memoir about her experience on Floreana. Margret later wrote her own account of events, which conflicted with those in Dore's memoir. Rudolph, who attempted to escape the island with a traveling fisherman, died offshore when the boat became caught in a storm. The Wittmers remained on Floreana, with Margret eventually dying there in 2000. Her and Heinz's descendants maintain a small hotel on the island for travelers.

== Cast ==
- Jude Law as Friedrich Ritter
- Ana de Armas as Baroness Eloise Bosquet de Wagner Wehrhorn
- Vanessa Kirby as Dore Strauch
- Daniel Brühl as Heinz Wittmer
- Sydney Sweeney as Margret Wittmer
- Jonathan Tittel as Harry Wittmer
- Felix Kammerer as Rudolph Lorenz
- Toby Wallace as Robert Phillipson
- Ignacio Gasparini as Manuel Borja
- Richard Roxburgh as Allan Hancock
- Tim Ross as Hancock's first officer

== Production ==
=== Development ===
It was announced in October 2022 that Ron Howard would direct the film, and he had begun the casting process and location scouting. The film was to be titled Origin of Species at that time. The screenplay by Noah Pink is based on the true story of a group of Europeans who attempted to settle Floreana Island in the 1930s.

=== Casting ===
In May 2023, Ana de Armas, Jude Law, Alicia Vikander and Daniel Brühl were cast, with Daisy Edgar-Jones in negotiations. Casting was permitted to continue during the 2023 SAG-AFTRA strike after securing an interim agreement with the guild. In November, the film was retitled to Eden, with Vanessa Kirby and Sydney Sweeney added to the cast to replace Vikander and Edgar-Jones respectively, and Hans Zimmer was set to compose the score. Edgar-Jones was forced to exit as a result of the SAG-AFTRA strike, as she needed to keep her commitment to Twisters, which had to halt production as a result of the strike. In December 2023, it was announced that Richard Roxburgh, Felix Kammerer, Toby Wallace, Paul Gleeson, and Ignacio Gasparini had joined the cast.

=== Filming ===
Filming began in November 2023, with production taking place in Queensland, Australia, and a small unit filming on the Galápagos Islands. Filming began on November 27, 2023, on the Australian Gold Coast.

The film was shot on a gross budget of $55 million, which was brought down to a net of $35 million after Australian tax incentives; the salaries of the cast, producers, Howard, and Pink accounted for 38% of the budget.

== Release ==
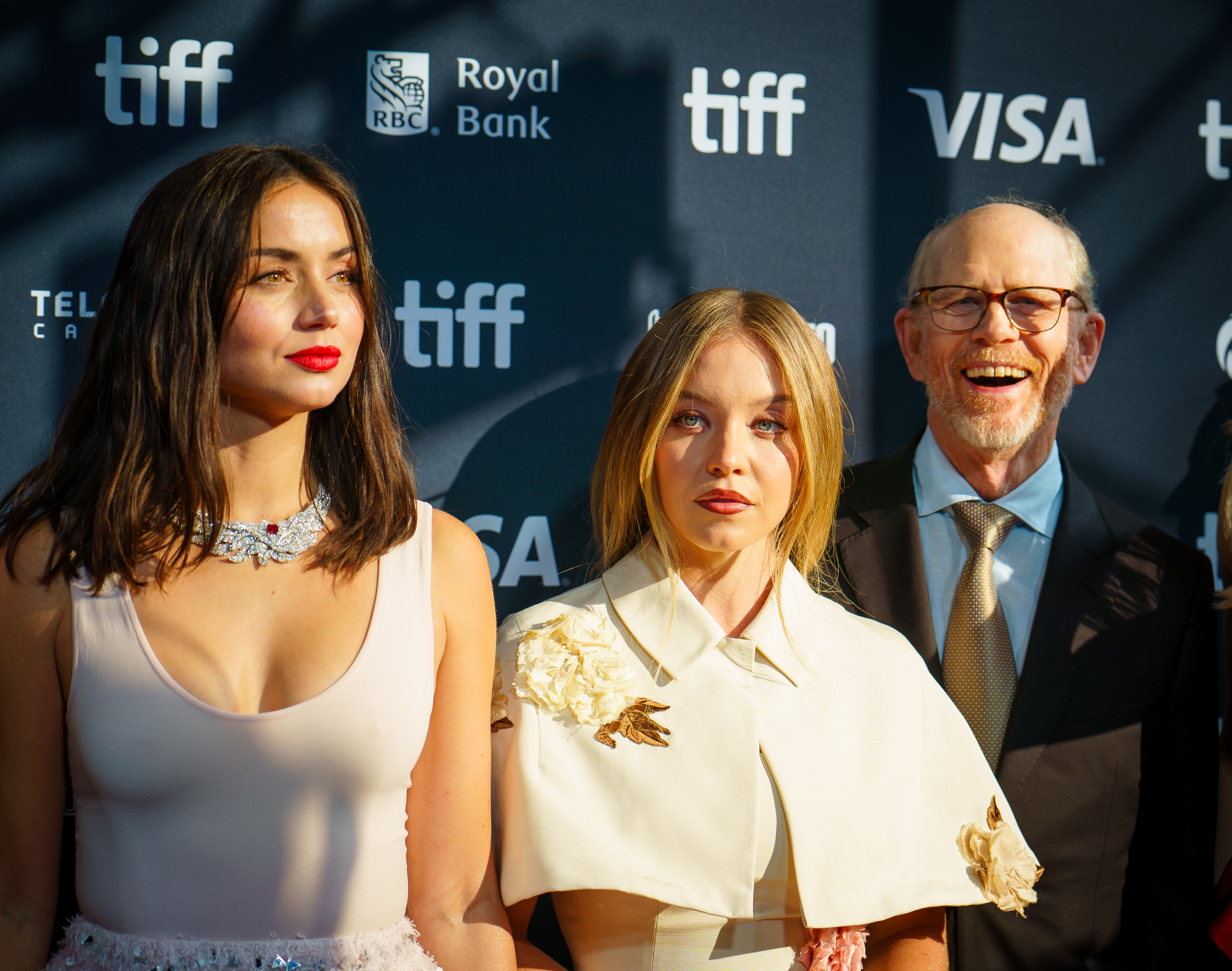
Ana de Armas, Sydney Sweeney and Ron Howard at the 2024 Toronto International Film Festival

The film premiered at the Toronto International Film Festival on September 7, 2024. It was released theatrically in Germany on April 3, 2025, and in Italy on April 10, 2025. Vertical released the film theatrically in the United States on August 22, 2025.

At the Cannes Film Market in May 2024, in advance of the film's premiere at TIFF that September, Amazon acquired distribution rights for international territories including the United Kingdom, Ireland, Australia, New Zealand, Canada, France, Scandinavia, Spain, the Americas, Japan, South Korea, South Africa, India, Turkey, the West Indies, and Asian pay television. The film was released on Amazon Prime Video on October 24, 2025.

== Reception ==
=== Box office ===
Following its releases in Germany and Italy, the film grossed a total of $825,041.

In the United States and Canada, the film made $1 million from 664 theaters in its opening weekend.

=== Critical response ===
On the review aggregator website Rotten Tomatoes, 58% of 125 critics' reviews are positive, with an average rating of 6/10. The website's consensus reads: "A cohesive theme gets marooned in Eden's melodramatic dramatization of a colorful true story, but it does provide a starry cast and salacious thrills as compensation." Metacritic, which uses a weighted average, assigned the film a score of 57 out of 100, based on 28 critics, indicating "mixed or average" reviews.

Glenn Kenney of The New York Times praised the film's performances, particularly that of de Armas, and summarized: "There are erotic shenanigans galore, and as the tension mounts, harrowing acts of violence. It’s a little surprising that these proceedings are led by the director Ron Howard, since this subject matter is more perverse than anything he has set his sights on before. The actors are up to the task, however." Kate Erbland of IndieWire remarked the film's dark humor, adding, "what we do get from Howard’s latest is a strong reminder of his handle on not just craft and casting, but also story and tone. No film about the utter demise of a supposed utopia — a real one, to boot! — and the utter infallibility of human beings should be this fun, but we’re lucky this one is." Mick LaSalle of the San Francisco Chronicle noted the screenplay's attention to historical detail as a strength, adding: "The only weakness of the movie is that, because it’s a true story, it can’t rearrange the order of events for maximum drama. Thus, what is essentially the climax of the film comes about three quarters in, and the rest of it, while never less than interesting, feels like falling action. The good news is that Sweeney and Kirby get their best scenes, respectively, in this last section of the movie."

Owen Gleiberman, writing for Variety, gave the film an unfavorable assessment, finding its characters "more dislikable by the minute" and described it as "a madcap version of Lord of the Flies... Eden lopes along, without energy or purpose, but with a great deal of random showboating." Michael Rechtshaffen of The Hollywood Reporter was also critical of the film, noting that its "prevailing overwrought tone lands more cartoonish than satirical, while a protracted running time accentuates the film’s deficiencies" and found the performances underwhelming, though he praised Sweeney's performance, noting that she "manages to retain the viewer’s sympathy and her character’s sanity as the decent pillar of stability that is Margaret."

== See also ==
- The Empress of Floreana – 1934 silent adventure short film
- The Galapagos Affair – 2013 documentary film
