= The Galapagos Affair =

2013 documentary film

- Theatrical release poster
- Directed by: Daniel Geller; Dayna Goldfine
- Written by: Daniel Geller; Dayna Goldfine; Celeste Schaefer Snyder
- Produced by: Daniel Geller; Dayna Goldfine; Celeste Schaefer Snyder
- Cinematography: Daniel Geller
- Edited by: Bill Webber
- Music by: Laura Karpman
- Production company: Geller/Goldfine Productions
- Distributed by: Zeitgeist Films
- Release dates: September 2, 2013 (TFF); April 4, 2014 (United States)
- Running time: 120 minutes
- Country: United States
- Language: English
- Box office: $247,159 (USA)

The Galapagos Affair: Satan Came to Eden is a 2013 feature-length documentary directed by Daniel Geller and Dayna Goldfine. It is about a series of unsolved disappearances on the Galapagos island of Floreana in the 1930s among the largely European expatriate residents at the time. The voice cast includes Cate Blanchett, Sebastian Koch, Thomas Kretschmann, Diane Kruger, Connie Nielsen, Josh Radnor and Gustaf Skarsgård.

It features the 1934 silent film The Empress of Floreana in its entirety, but the four-minute short is split into halves.

== Plot ==
This documentary shares a true story set in the 1930s on the Galapagos Islands. Disenchanted individuals from Europe sought refuge there after World War I, led by a German doctor, Friedrich Ritter, and a woman named Dore Strauch. The arrival of other settlers, including the Wittmers and the eccentric "Baroness" Eloise von Wagner-Bousquet, sparked tensions, disappearances, and rumors of foul play. Despite its excess, the film tells a remarkable tale, featuring actors like Cate Blanchett reading from diaries and reminiscences.

== Cast (voices) ==
- Cate Blanchett as Dore Strauch
- Sebastian Koch as Heinz Wittmer
- Thomas Kretschmann as Friedrich Ritter
- Diane Kruger as Margret Wittmer
- Connie Nielsen as Baroness von Wagner-Bousquet
- Josh Radnor as John Garth
- Gustaf Skarsgård as Rolf Blomberg

== Release ==
The film premiered at the 40th Telluride Film Festival on September 2, 2013. It was an official selection of the Hamptons International Film Festival on October 12, 2013, and Berlin International Film Festival on February 10, 2014. It opened theatrically in the US on April 4, 2014.

== Critical response ==
On review aggregator Rotten Tomatoes, the film holds an approval rating of 83% based on 53 reviews, with an average rating of 6.92/10. The website's critics consensus reads: "It doesn't quite live up to its marvelously lurid premise, but The Galapagos Affair is still stranger than fiction in a very entertaining way." On Metacritic, the film has a weighted average score of 69 out of 100, based on 21 critics, indicating "generally favorable reviews".

A review on Rogerebert views "the tension of that original storyline is slackened" by constantly introducing new plotlines.

== See also ==
- Eden (2024 film)
