= Nicholas Lawson =

Nicholas Oliver Lawson (born Nicolai Olaus Lossius; 23 November 1790 – 1 March 1851) was a Norwegian-born, vice governor of Galápagos for the Republic of Ecuador. While there, he provided information which contributed to Charles Darwin's first realisation that species might be changeable, and eventually to Darwin's theorising about evolution.

== Early life ==
Nicolai Olaus Lossius was born on the island of Sekken in Romsdal county, Norway on 23 November 1790. He was baptized in Veøy Church outside Molde in Romsdal during late 1790. At 16, he went to sea where he sailed from England. He served on ships making the passage to Brazil and in the Mediterranean and was captured by Barbary corsairs in 1809 and enslaved before being released.

As Nicholas Oliver Lawson, he took citizenship in the United States in 1811. At the start of the War of 1812 between the United States and Great Britain he narrowly escaped capture by the British near Gibraltar. He served as US officer in the war and later settled in Canada where he worked as a merchant. He was declared bankrupt in 1816.

By 1818, he had joined the Chilean Navy and fought in the Chilean War of Independence (1810–1821), aboard the Lautaro. He was wounded several times and was awarded his medal for actions during a battle near Valdivia in 1820. During one battle he captured a Spanish schooner and took a Spanish officer prisoner. The officer was mortally wounded and begged Lawson to make sure his family was cared for. Lawson left the Chilean military in 1823 but the following year married Rosario Asenjo (b. 1807) the daughter of the Spanish officer.

== Galápagos Islands ==
Lawson operated as a ship builder, owner and trader, often stopping at the Galápagos Islands to resupply with water and food (tortoises). Because of his familiarity with the islands he was appointed vice-governor by José de Villamil in 1832, he served in the role until 1837.

Lawson was acting governor when Charles Darwin visited the islands in September 1835. Darwin named Lawson several times in his notes and diaries. When the Beagle survey expedition arrived at Charles Island (Floreana Island) in September 1835, Darwin noted in his diary: "An Englishman Mr Lawson is now acting as Governor. — By chance he came down to visit a Whaling Vessel & in the morning accompanied us to the Settlement." Lawson described having seen a reduction in the numbers and size of Galápagos tortoises taken for meat by the whalers. In his zoological notes, Darwin recorded that "It is said that slight variations in the form of the shell are constant according to the Island which they inhabit — also the average largest size appears equally to vary according to the locality.— Mr Lawson states he can on seeing a Tortoise pronounce with certainty from which island it has been brought." This was one of the points which Darwin listed later in the voyage, between mid-June and August 1836, as arousing his first suspicion that "such facts would undermine the stability of Species". After the voyage, Darwin developed this idea during his investigations into transmutation of species, resulting in his theory of evolution.

Lawson introduced goats, sheep and pigs to Floreana, and possibly other islands, by 1830. These grew quickly in number and damaged the natural habitat. He also planted wheat, barley, figs, papaya, lemons and sugarcane on the island. The cotton plants he brought over hybridised with the native plants, the hybrid is now the dominant variety in the region around Puerto Velasco Ibarra.

== Later life ==
By 1839, Lawson returned to his wife and children in Valparaíso, Chile. He later served as a naval architect for Chilean government vessels before returning briefly to the Galápagos to manage a small Chilean colony there. He unsuccessfully sought appointment as consul at Valparaiso for the Union between Sweden and Norway. Lawson died at Valparaiso on 1 March 1851.
