= Conservation International Ecuador =

Country programme of Conservation International in Ecuador

- Conservación Internacional Ecuador
- Abbreviation: CI Ecuador
- Formation: 2001
- Type: Country programme
- Headquarters: Quito, Ecuador
- Region served: Ecuador
- Fields: Biodiversity conservation; protected areas; marine and coastal conservation; climate resilience
- Parent organization: Conservation International
- Website: ecuador.conservation.org

Conservation International Ecuador (CI Ecuador; Conservación Internacional Ecuador) is the Ecuador country programme of Conservation International. The programme was established in 2001.

Work described in project and policy documentation includes biodiversity conservation and protected-area conservation in the Galápagos Islands, support related to implementing Ecuador's mainland marine and coastal protected areas network strategic plan, participation in Amazon regional planning and community-based conservation in Indigenous territories, and climate-resilience initiatives linked to mangrove ecosystems in coastal Ecuador.

Its work has included initiatives supported through multilateral funding arrangements, including projects involving the Global Environment Facility and the Green Climate Fund.

== Overview ==
CI Ecuador reports offices in Quito, Guayaquil, Coca and Puyo. Work described in project and policy documentation includes initiatives in the Galápagos Islands focused on biosecurity and ecosystem restoration, and support related to implementing Ecuador's mainland marine and coastal protected areas network strategic plan. It has also been described as participating in Amazon regional planning and supporting community-based conservation in Indigenous territories, alongside climate-resilience initiatives linked to mangrove ecosystems.

CI Ecuador operates a public contact and feedback channel (CI-Ecuador te Escucha) for requests, concerns and complaints related to its work. In practical terms, it functions as a grievance and feedback mechanism that allows people to raise issues about activities and request a response.

== History ==
Conservation International established its Ecuador country programme in 2001 and maintains a national office presence in Ecuador.

During the 2010s, CI Ecuador took roles in initiatives supported through the Global Environment Facility (GEF), including serving as the GEF project agency for the Galápagos biosecurity and ecosystem restoration project and acting as GEF agency for work related to implementing the strategic plan for Ecuador's mainland marine and coastal protected areas network.

In the 2020s, CI Ecuador participated in regional marine-conservation discussions linked to the Eastern Tropical Pacific Marine Corridor (CMAR), and in climate-resilience initiatives linked to mangrove ecosystems, including a Green Climate Fund project (FP235) approved in July 2024 with Conservation International Foundation as the accredited entity.

== Programmes and operations ==
Selected programme locations in Ecuador (1 Quito; 2 Guayaquil; 3 Coca; 4 Puyo; 5 Galápagos Islands (off-map))

=== Galápagos Islands ===
Conservation International has served as the GEF project agency for Safeguarding biodiversity in the Galapagos Islands by enhancing biosecurity and creating the enabling environment for the restoration of Galapagos Island ecosystems. The project documentation describes work to strengthen biosecurity across the archipelago and support ecological restoration, including invasive-vertebrate eradication on Floreana Island and the translocation of giant tortoises to Santa Fe Island as part of restoration plans. It is a multi-year project financed through a GEF grant and cofinancing.

Plastic pollution and other marine debris have been reported as persistent pressures on coastal sites in the Galápagos, including areas used by wildlife, with pollution patterns linked to ocean currents and the dumping of waste at sea by fishing vessels.

=== Ecuadorian Amazon ===
CI Ecuador reports offices in Coca and Puyo. Conservación Internacional Ecuador participated in the technical team for Ecuador's Amazon regional planning process, the Plan Integral para la Amazonía 2021-2035. Work has included participation in Ecuador's [[Socio Bosque|Socio Bosque]] programme and support for participatory processes with Achuar communities seeking to enter the programme.

=== Mainland marine and coastal areas ===
On mainland Ecuador, the GEF project Implementation of the Strategic Plan of Ecuador Mainland Marine and Coastal Protected Areas Network (GEF ID 9369) is framed around strengthening conservation and sustainable use of marine and coastal biodiversity through an effective network of coastal and marine protected areas in mainland Ecuador. The project initiative has been described as supporting implementation of a national strategic plan for the network and strengthening protected-area management and enabling conditions for marine and coastal biodiversity conservation and sustainable use.

The Eastern Tropical Pacific Marine Corridor (Corredor Marino del Pacífico Este Tropical, CMAR) was created by the 2004 San José Declaration as a voluntary regional cooperation mechanism intended to promote conservation and sustainable use of marine biodiversity in the eastern tropical Pacific. CI Ecuador has participated in regional marine-conservation discussions linked to CMAR.

The Green Climate Fund project Mangroves for climate: Public, Private and Community Partnerships for Mitigation and Adaptation in Ecuador (FP235) addresses climate risks in coastal regions and pressures on mangrove ecosystems associated with shrimp farming and coastal development, and includes measures described as results-based payments alongside governance and supply-chain approaches.

Selected programme landscapes and locations of Conservation International Ecuador
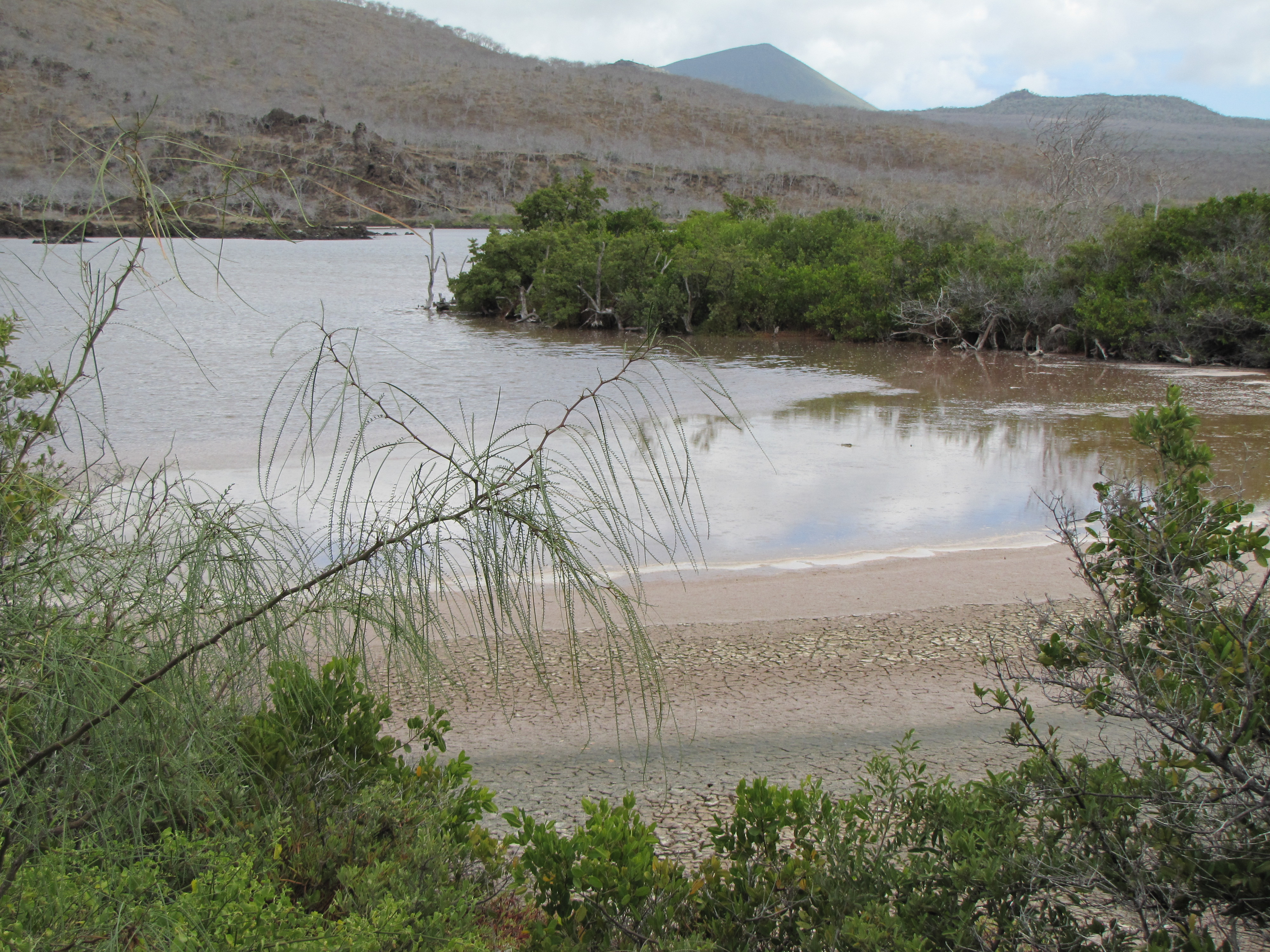
Floreana Island, where Galápagos restoration planning has included invasive-vertebrate eradication

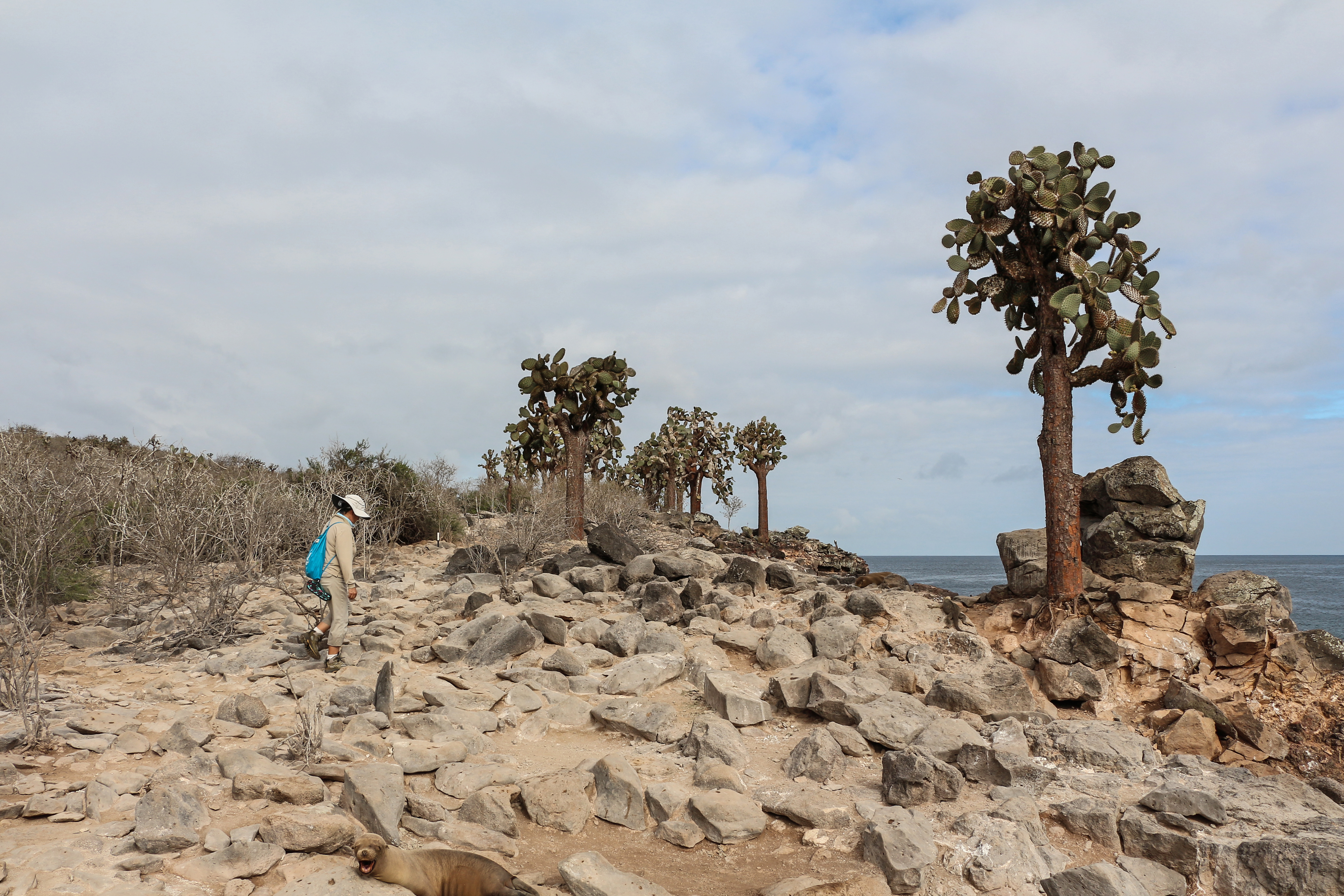
Santa Fe Island, where restoration plans have included giant tortoise translocation

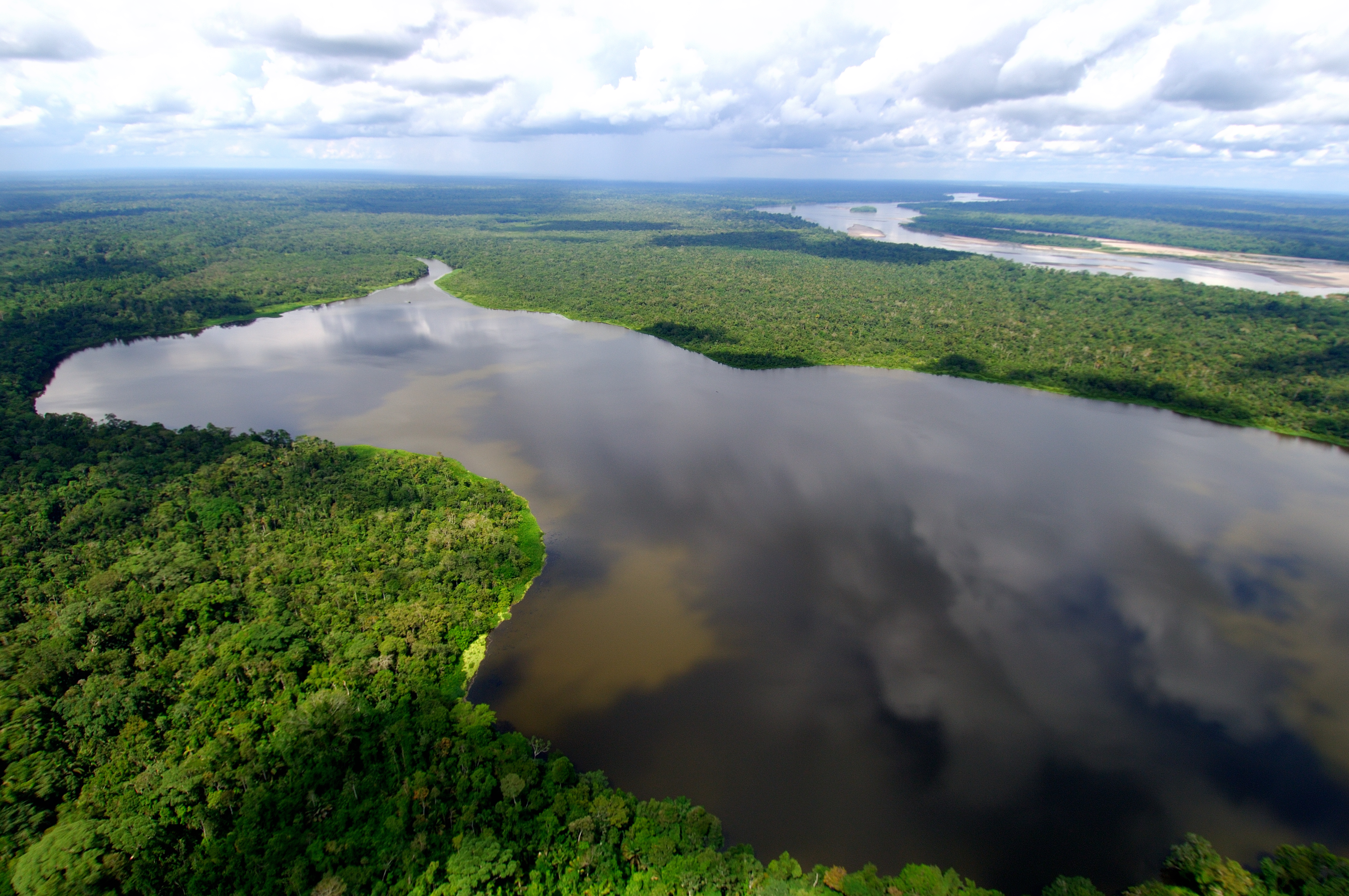
Laguna de Limoncocha and the Napo River in Orellana Province, part of the Ecuadorian Amazon

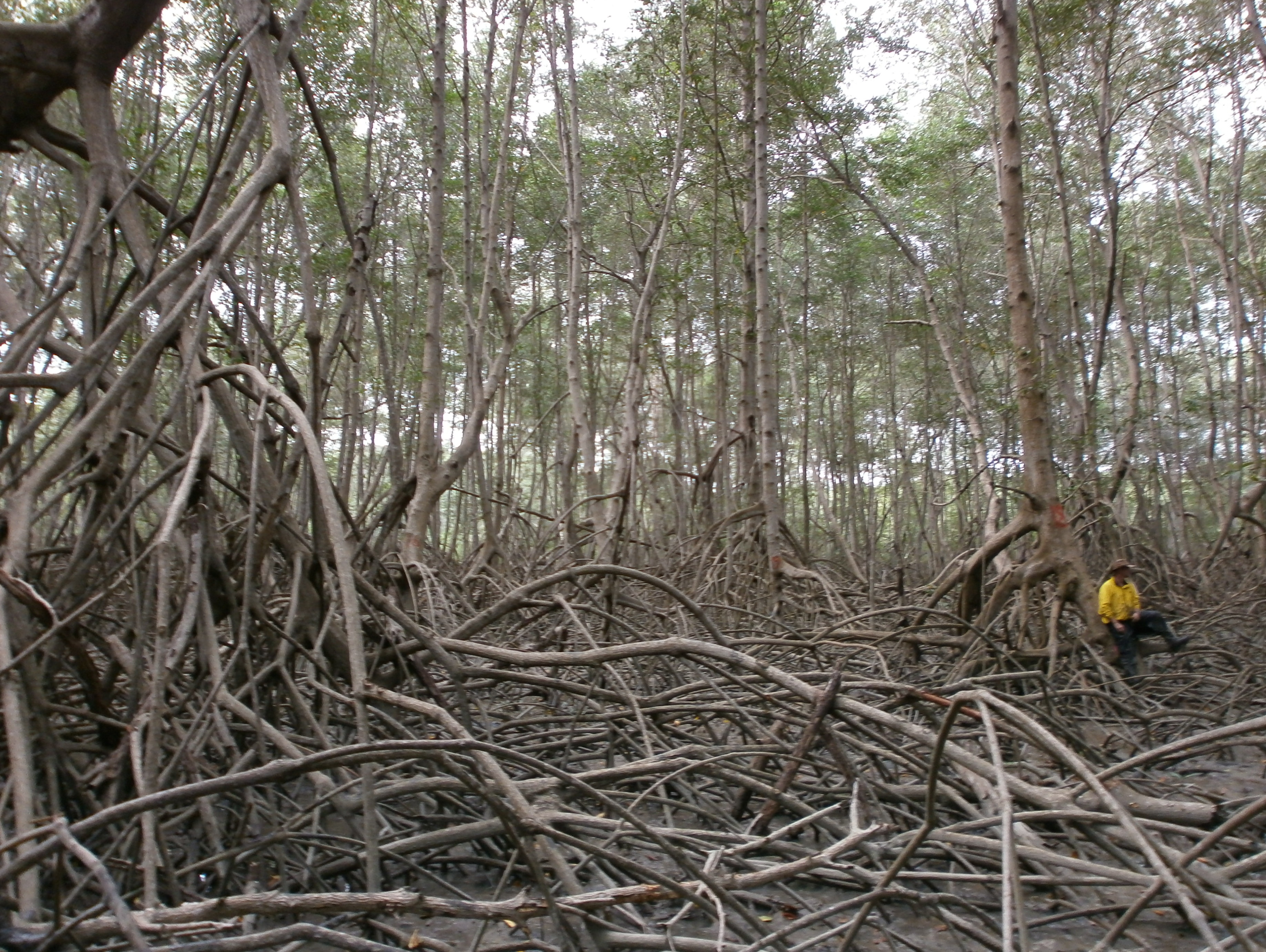
Mangrove forest in Guayaquil, representative of coastal mangrove ecosystems addressed in CI Ecuador's climate-resilience work

== Partnerships ==
In the Galápagos, the GEF project documentation describes implementation roles for Ecuadorian institutions involved in protected-area management and biosecurity, alongside participation by partner organisations supporting invasive-species and restoration work.

For the mainland marine and coastal protected-areas network strategic-plan implementation project (GEF ID 9369), listed partners include Conservation International and Ecuador's Undersecretary of Marine and Coastal Management (within the Ministry of Environment).

For the Green Climate Fund project FP235, Conservation International Foundation is the accredited entity and Conservation International Ecuador is identified as the executing entity. Implementation arrangements describe an inter-institutional steering committee including Ecuador's Ministry of Environment, Water and Ecological Transition (MAATE), the Vice-ministry of Aquaculture and Fisheries (VMAP), the National Chamber of Aquaculture (NCA), the Fisheries and Aquaculture Public Research Institute (IPIAP) and the Oceanographic Institute of the Navy (INOCAR), alongside arrangements for work with universities and community organisations through subgrant mechanisms.

== Funding and conservation finance ==
The Global Environment Facility (GEF) provides financing primarily as grants for environmental projects, and GEF-supported initiatives are commonly structured as a GEF grant alongside cofinancing from governments and other partners.

The Green Climate Fund finances climate change mitigation and adaptation projects and works through accredited entities that develop funding proposals and manage and monitor approved projects and programmes under the Fund's accreditation framework.

Project documentation for GEF ID 9282 reports a total project cost of about US$21.8 million, including a GEF grant of US$3,421,472 and planned cofinancing of US$18,395,000.

For GEF ID 9369 (implementation of the strategic plan for Ecuador's mainland marine and coastal protected areas network), the project description reports a total project cost of US$39,702,993, with a GEF allocation of US$5,813,303 and reported cofinancing of US$33,889,690.

The Green Climate Fund project FP235 was approved on 18 July 2024 with Conservation International Foundation as the accredited entity. Investment information for FP235 lists GCF financing of US$36,404,391 (grant) and total cofinancing of US$9,530,533.

== Impact and evaluation ==
Most publicly available material for CI Ecuador's large projects is project design and financing documentation. These documents define intended outcomes, indicators, and evaluation arrangements; they describe planned results rather than independently verified impacts achieved.

For the Galápagos biosecurity and ecosystem-restoration project (GEF ID 9282), the results framework sets outcome-level targets for strengthening biosecurity and enabling ecosystem restoration on priority islands. Targets include an increase of more than 5% in the interception of prohibited items, installation of detection equipment at 10% of major biosecurity control points, and implementation of 20% of recommendations from a biosecurity action plan during the project period. The same framework describes targets for community participation and restoration support on Floreana (including a target of 80% of residents taking actions aligned with restoration objectives and 100% of residents supporting implementation of island restoration actions), alongside restoration-related targets linked to giant-tortoise translocation and monitoring, including 506 tortoises dispersing seeds across about 50% of Santa Fe Island as an ecosystem-process indicator. The monitoring and evaluation plan includes routine progress reporting and oversight mechanisms and provides for independent mid-term and terminal evaluations.

For the mangrove-focused climate project FP235, the funding proposal describes expected mitigation and adaptation results through the Green Climate Fund results framework and a project logical framework. Summary impact figures in the proposal include an expected mitigation outcome of 732,111 tCO_{2}e reduced or avoided by the end of the implementation period and 4,609,470 tCO_{2}e over a 20-year project lifespan, alongside estimates of direct and indirect beneficiaries (including gender-disaggregated figures). The proposal's core indicators include targets such as 19,800 hectares of mangroves under improved management practices and 3,900 hectares of mangroves restored and/or rehabilitated by the end of the project, alongside an adaptation-related target framed as avoided loss of property due to extreme weather events (with interim and final target values stated in the proposal). Evaluation arrangements described in the proposal include an interim evaluation (specified for year 4) and a final evaluation at project completion, alongside regular monitoring and reporting under the Green Climate Fund's results-based management approach.
