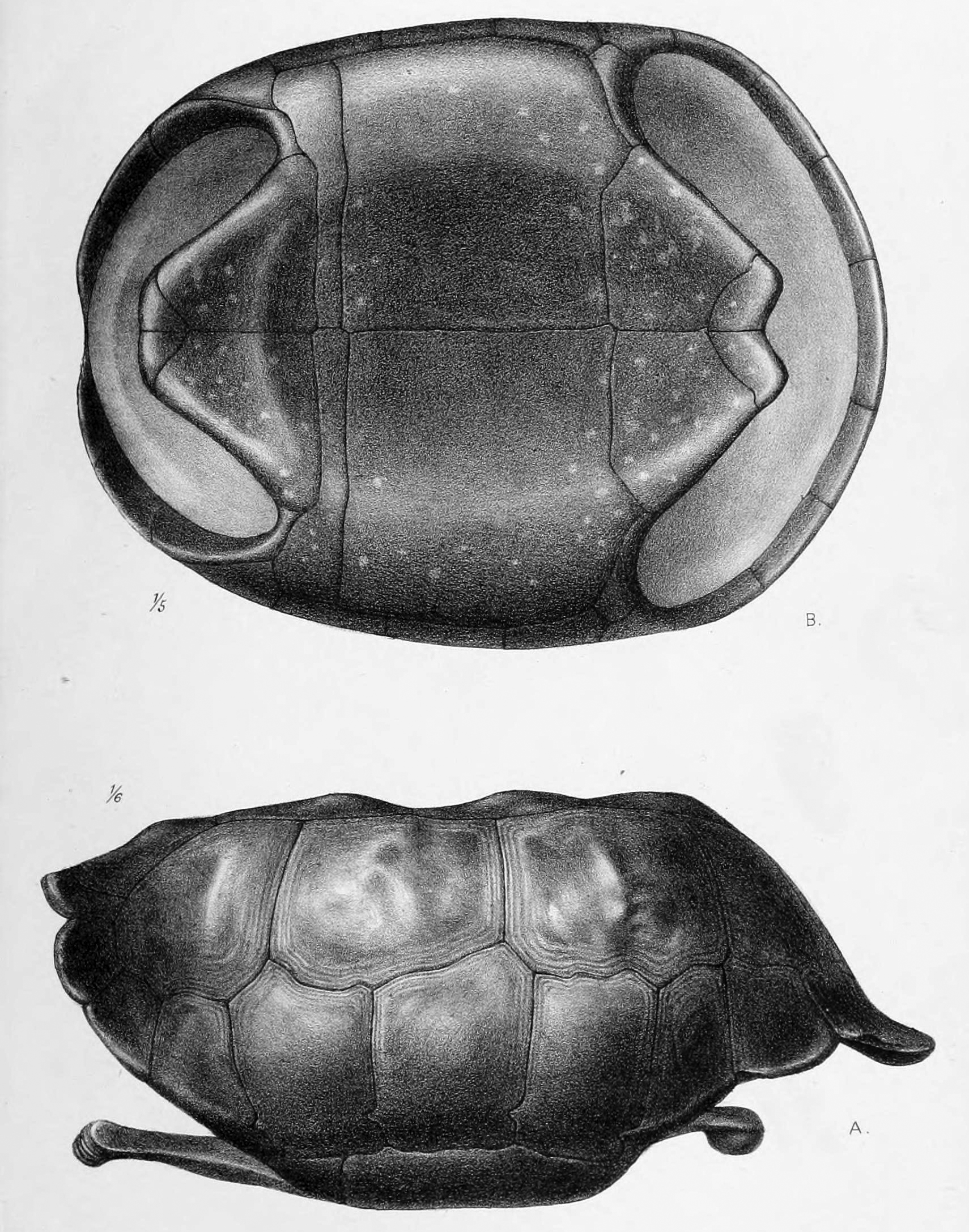
- Illustration of the shell

Conservation status
- Extinct (IUCN 3.1)

Scientific classification
- Kingdom: Animalia
- Phylum: Chordata
- Class: Reptilia
- Order: Testudines
- Suborder: Cryptodira
- Family: Testudinidae
- Genus: Chelonoidis
- Species: C. niger
- Subspecies: C. n. niger

Trinomial name
- Chelonoidis niger niger (Quoy & Gaimard, 1824)

Synonyms
- List: Testudo nigra Quoy & Gaimard, 1824; Testudo elephantopus Harlan, 1826; Testudo californica Gray, 1831; Testudo planiceps Gray, 1854; Testudo galapagoensis Baur, 1889; Testudo elephantopus elephantopus Mertens & Wermuth, 1955; Testudo elephantopus galapagoensis Wermuth & Mertens, 1955; Geochelone elephantopus elephantopus Pritchard, 1967; Chelonoidis elephantopus elephantopus Obst, 1985; Geochelone elephantopus Ernst & Barbour, 1989; Geochelone nigra King & Burke, 1989; Chelonoidis nigra David, 1994; Chelonoidis nigra galapagoensis David, 1994; Chelonoidis niger Olson & David, 2014

= Floreana giant tortoise =

Species of giant tortoise

The Floreana giant tortoise (Chelonoidis niger niger), also known as the Charles Island giant tortoise, is a subspecies of the Galápagos tortoise endemic to the Galápagos archipelago in the equatorial eastern Pacific Ocean. The specific epithet niger (‘black’) probably refers to the colouration of the holotype specimen. The species name has often been misspelled as nigra, an error introduced in the 1980s when Chelonoidis was elevated to genus and mistakenly treated as feminine, an error recognized and fixed in 2017.

In 2012, hybrids of the subspecies with Chelonoidis becki were discovered on Isabela Island. Since then, back breeding has been used to recreate the original subspecies and help it regain its genetic purity. As of 2025, 400 tortoises have been hatched in captivity on Santa Cruz Island. However, the IUCN has yet to update the subspecies' status due to lack of a genetically pure specimen at the time of the 2017 evaluation.

== Taxonomy ==
This tortoise is a member of Chelonoidis niger, comprising all Galápagos tortoise subspecies, of which it is the nominate form.

== Description ==
Male tortoises grow to about 138 cm (54 in) and females to 88 cm (35 in) in length, with strongly saddlebacked carapaces.

== Behaviour ==
The tortoises used to descend to the lower slopes of their volcanic island to graze on new vegetation after wet season rains. They fed on grass, bitterbush and cacti, obtaining water from springs and from cracks in the lava rocks.

== Distribution and habitat ==
The tortoise's natural range was limited to 173 km^{2} (67 sq mi) Floreana Island (formerly Charles Island) where it inhabited deciduous and evergreen forests.

== Relationship with humans ==
=== Decline and initial extinction ===
The tortoise population of Floreana is estimated to have originally comprised some 8,000 individuals. Extinction occurred during the 1840s or 1850s following overexploitation for food by sailors and settlers, as well as predation and habitat degradation from introduced species, including goats, pigs, dogs, cats, donkeys, and rodents. Also blamed for the extinction was a massive wildfire on Floreana in 1820, initially started as a prank by Thomas Chappel, a crewman on the whaling ship Essex (best known for being sunk by a sperm whale shortly afterwards, inspiring the novel Moby-Dick). By the time Charles Darwin arrived in 1835, decades of exploitation had driven the population to critically low levels, with Darwin recording that about 20 years worth of harvestable tortoises were left. The tortoises finally disappeared around 1850.

=== Discovery of hybrids and revival ===
In 2012, several hybrids between this species and Chelonoidis becki were discovered around Wolf Volcano on Isabela Island, apparently from some of the Floreana tortoises being transported there in the early 19th century. In 2017, a breeding program began to resurrect the Floreana subspecies. By 2023, about 400 Floreana tortoise offspring had been produced from the breeding program, and there are plans to reintroduce some of these to Floreana in 2024, as part of a rewilding programme following the successful removal of invasive species from the island in December 2023. However, IUCN has yet to update the status of the subspecies due to lack of a genetically pure specimen at the time of the 2017 evaluation and the de-extinct subspecies has yet to reproduce naturally in the wild.

== See also ==
- Lazarus taxon
