= Barrington leaf-toed gecko =

Conservation status
- Least Concern (IUCN 3.1)

Scientific classification
- Kingdom: Animalia
- Phylum: Chordata
- Class: Reptilia
- Order: Squamata
- Suborder: Gekkota
- Family: Phyllodactylidae
- Genus: Phyllodactylus
- Species: P. barringtonensis

Binomial name
- Phyllodactylus barringtonensis Van Denburgh, 1912

Species of lizard

The Barrington leaf-toed gecko (Phyllodactylus barringtonensis) is a species of lizard in the family Phyllodactylidae. The species is endemic to Santa Fe Island in the Galapagos.

== Etymology ==
The specific name, barringtonensis, refers to Barrington Island, which is an alternate name for Santa Fe Island.

== Habitat ==
The preferred natural habitat of P. barringtonensis is dry shrubland, at altitudes from sea level to 240 m (790 ft).

== Description ==
The holotype of P. barringtonensis has a snout-to-vent length (SVL) of 4.1 cm (1.6 in).

== Reproduction ==
P. barringtonensis is oviparous.
