= Asilo de la Paz =

Location in the Galápagos Islands

Asilo de la Paz (English: Haven of Peace) is a location on Floreana Island in the Galapagos archipelago. It is the site of Floreana's first human settlement, and is now among the island's most popular tourist attractions. The site has a maximum elevation of 450 meters above sea level.

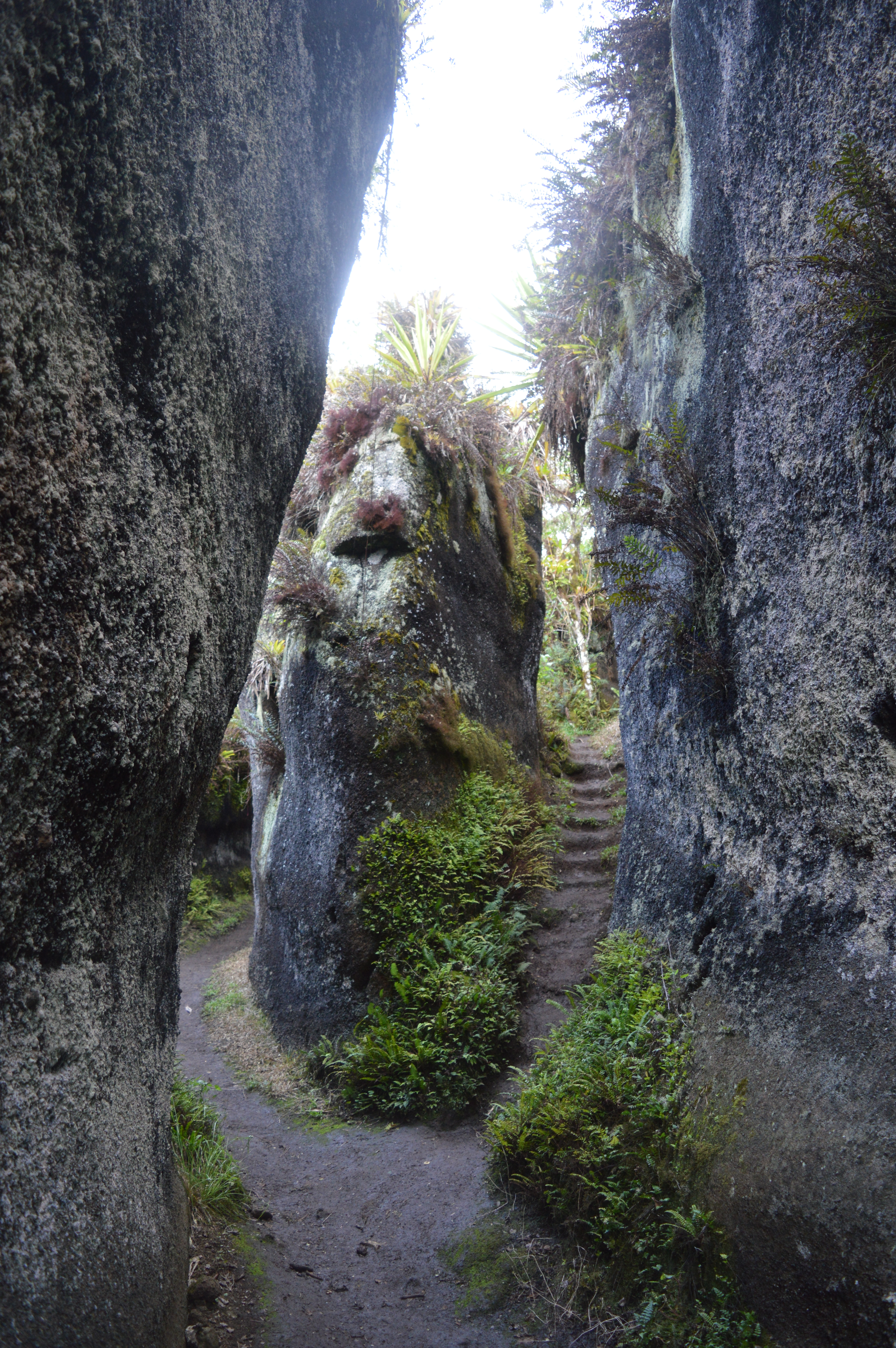
Rock labyrinth at Asilo de la Paz

== History ==
In August 1932, Heinz Wittmer, his wife Margret, and Heinz's son Harry, moved to Floreana from Cologne, Germany. They initially lived in a cave at Asilo de la Paz, near a spring that provided the island's only permanent source of freshwater. On 1 January 1933, Margret gave birth to Rolf Wittmer (1933–2011) inside one of the caves; he was the first person born in the Galapagos. At this site, the family built a home, with a roof made from tanned hides and banana leaves, and named it "Casa de la Paz" (English: House of Peace). They grew vegetables all year round and used the nearby caves as pig-pens, smokehouses, and storehouses. The Wittmers remained at the site until 1950, when they moved from the Floreana highlands to Black Beach.

== Wildlife ==
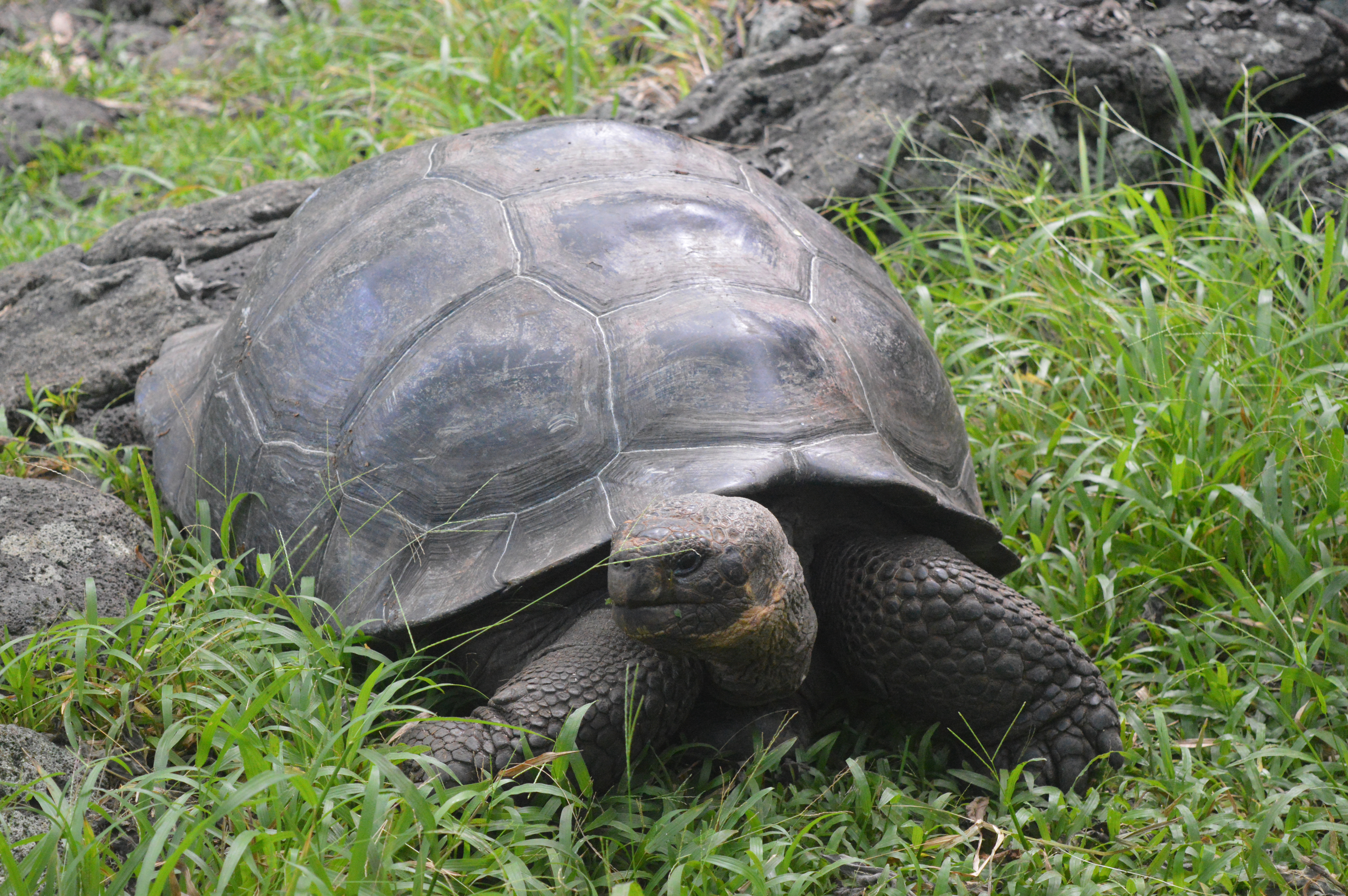
A captive Galápagos tortoise at Asilo de la Paz

Asilo de la Paz contains an area of intact Scalesia forest that provides important habitat for multiple species of Darwin's finch, including the critically endangered medium tree finch (Camarhynchus pauper). A warbler finch (Certhidea fusca), previously considered extinct on Floreana, was reportedly heard at Asilo de la Paz in 2008, although this sighting is not universally accepted. Giant tortoises, previously owned as pets by the island's residents, roam a large enclosed area at Asilo de la Paz. These tortoises are a mixture of species from other islands, since Floreana's native tortoise, Chelonoidis elephantopus, has been extinct on the island since shortly after 1835.

== See also ==
- Cerro Pajas
