= Wollbach =

Wollbach may refer to:

- Wollbach, Lower Franconia, a municipality in the district of Rhön-Grabfeld in Bavaria, Germany
- Wollbach (Burkardroth), a part of Burkardroth, a municipality in the district of Bad Kissingen in Bavaria, Germany
- Wollbach (Kandern), a part of Kandern, a town in the district of Lörrach in Baden-Württemberg, Germany
- Wollbach (Kander), a river of Baden-Württemberg, Germany, left tributary of the river Kander in Wollbach (Kandern)
