= Friedrich Ritter (physician) =

Floreana Island settler

- Born: Friedrich Ritter circa 1886; Wollbach, Germany
- Died: November 21, 1934 (aged 47–48); Floreana Island, Ecuador
- Occupations: Doctor and philosopher
- Known for: The Galapagos Affair
- Partner: Dore Strauch

Friedrich Ritter (1886-November 21, 1934) was a German physician and a self-professed philosopher and theosophist. In 1929, seeking a utopian "Robinson Crusoe" life away from civilization, he moved to the uninhabited Floreana Island in the Galapagos with his companion, Dore Strauch.

He was a key figure in the "Galapagos Affair", a mysterious series of events involving other settlers that included disappearances and deaths.

== Death ==
He died in November 1934, officially from food poisoning (likely from poorly preserved chicken, despite being a vegetarian), though some suspected Dore Strauch of poisoning him.

== Legacy ==
The movie Eden directed by Ron Howard tells the story of Ritter and the events surrounding the mystery of the Galapagos Affair. In the film, he is played by Jude Law.

== See also ==
- The Galapagos Affair, 2013 film
