= Santa Fe Island =

Island of the Galápagos archipelago

Santa Fe Island (Barrington Island)
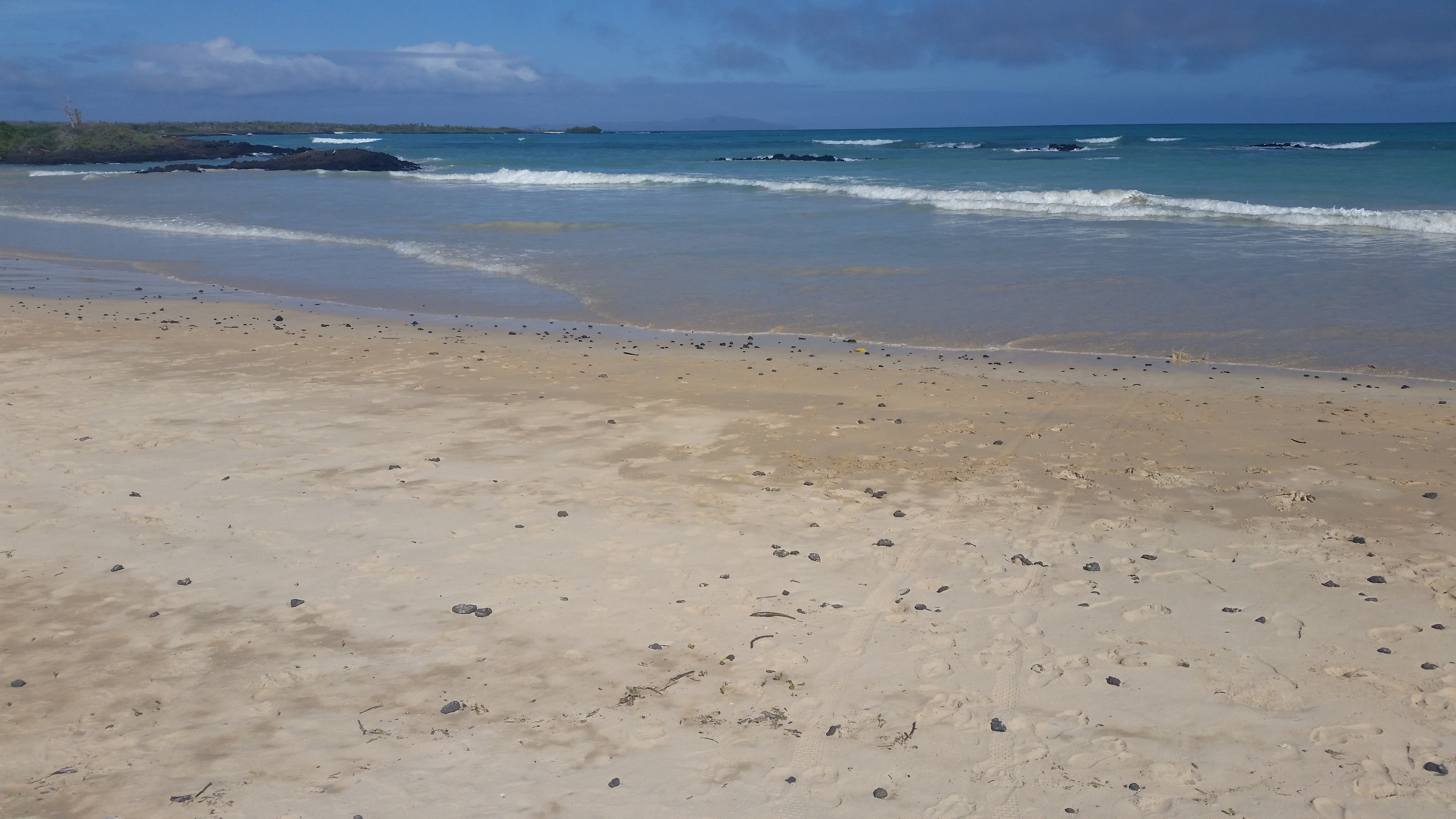
- Isla Santa Fe as seen from Playa el Garrapatero, Isla Santa Cruz

- Location within Galápagos Islands

Geography
- Location: Galápagos Islands, Ecuador
- Coordinates: 0.818°S 90.062°W
- Archipelago: Galápagos Islands

Administration
- Ecuador

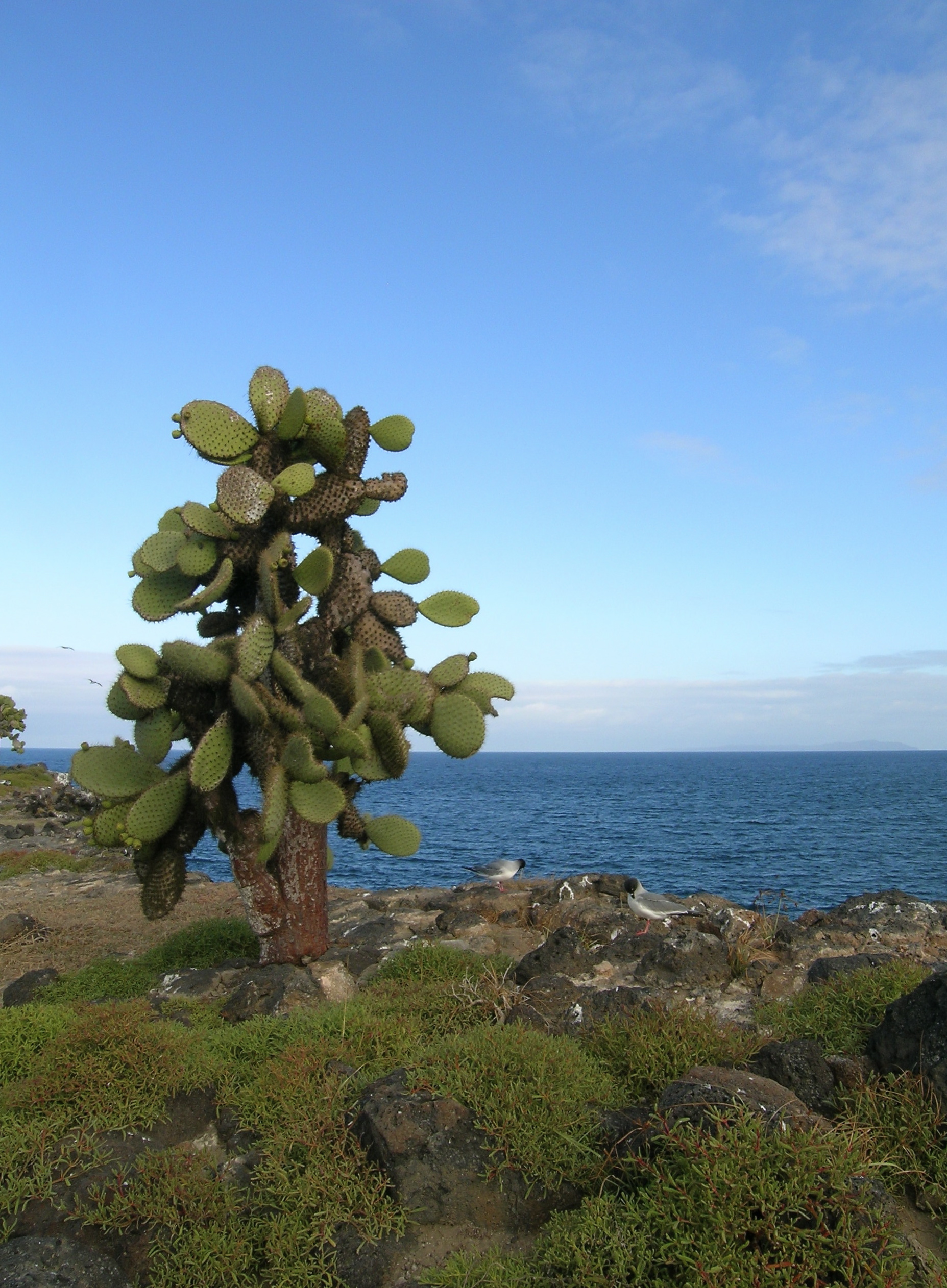
Prickly pear cactus and swallow-tailed gulls on Santa Fe Island

Santa Fe Island (Spanish: Isla Santa Fé), also known as Barrington Island, is a small island of 24 square kilometres (9.3 mi^{2}) which lies in the middle of the Galápagos Archipelago in Ecuador. Visitor access is by a wet landing in Barrington Bay on the northeastern side of the island.

== Names ==
The name Santa Fé is Spanish for "Holy Faith" in reference to Roman Catholic Christianity.

The English name Barrington Island was bestowed in 1794 by James Colnett in honor of Admiral Samuel Barrington, noted for his kindness to the sailors under his commands.

== Geography ==
Santa Fe lies in the middle of the Galápagos Archipelago in Ecuador. It is southeast of Santa Cruz Island.

== Environment ==
Geologically, the island is one of the oldest of the archipelago; volcanic rocks of about 4 million years old have been found.

The vegetation of the island is characterized by brush, palo santo trees and stands of a large subvariety of the Galápagos prickly pear cactus, Opuntia galapageia subvar. barringtonensis.

Santa Fe is home to two endemic species and two endemic subspecies: the Barrington land iguana (Conolophus pallidus), the Barrington leaf-toed gecko (Phyllodactylus barringtonensis), the Santa Fe marine iguana (Amblyrhynchus cristatus trillmichi) and the Santa Fe rice rat (Aegialomys galapagoensis bauri). Large numbers of sea lions are found on the beaches of Barrington Bay, occasionally hindering access to the two trails leading from the beach.

The island used to have its own, so far undescribed, species of Galápagos tortoise, the endemic Santa Fe tortoise, which became extinct in the mid 19th century because of overexploitation by whalers and settlers. For over 150 years the island had no tortoises. Genetic examination of tortoise bones found on the island showed that its closest relative was the Hood Island giant tortoise (Chelonoidis hoodensis) from Española Island (formerly Hood Island). Following a decision made at an international workshop on giant tortoises in 2012, a program was initiated to reestablish a tortoise population on Santa Fe, using the Española Island species as an ecological analogue, or substitute. The tortoises are ecologically important for the island ecosystem, especially for their role as seed dispersers. Between 2015 and 2021 the Santa Fe Tortoise Project successfully introduced some 700 juvenile and 31 subadult Española tortoises to Santa Fe to complete the ecological restoration program (which had begun in the 1970s with the eradication of feral goats) for the island. A Global Environment Facility project on Galápagos biosecurity and ecosystem restoration with Conservation International Ecuador as the project agency includes the translocation of giant tortoises to the island.
