= Cerro Pajas =

Inactive volcano in the Galápagos Islands

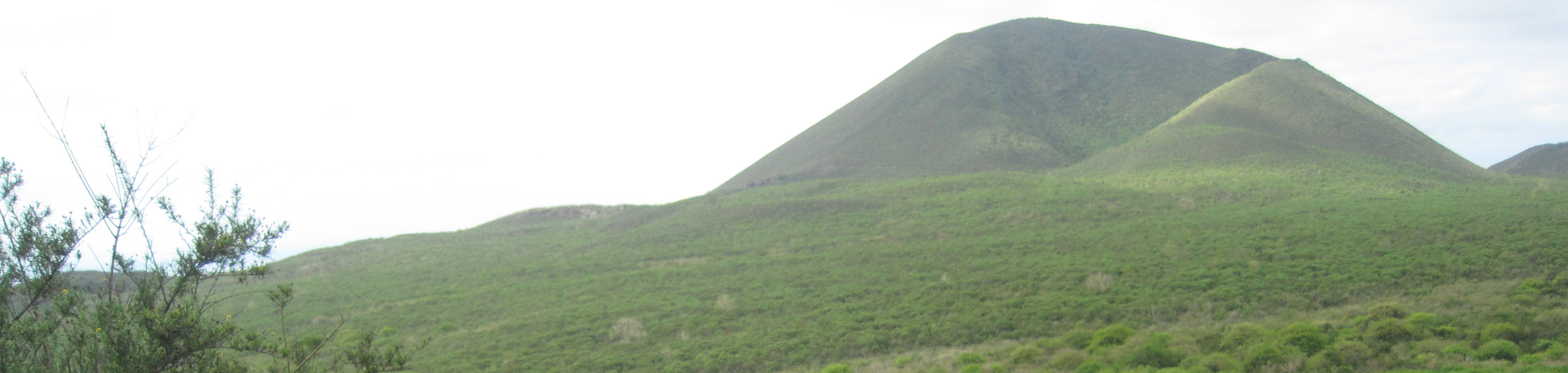

Highest point
- Elevation: 640 m (2,100 ft)
- Prominence: 359 m (1,178 ft)
- Listing: Ultra
- Coordinates: 1°17′37″S 90°27′26″W

Geography
- Location within Galápagos Islands
- Location: Floreana Island, Galápagos Islands, Ecuador

Cerro Pajas (also known as Cerro Paja or Cerro de pajas) is an inactive volcano located in the south of Floreana Island in the Galápagos Islands, Ecuador. It is the highest peak on Floreana, with a maximum elevation of 640 meters (2,100 ft) above sea level. (Note: Some sources give an elevation of 540 meters or 550 meters.)

== Wildlife ==
The area around the Cerro Pajas crater contains the largest expanse of highland Scalesia pedunculata forest on the island, providing important habitat for multiple species of Darwin's finches, including the critically endangered medium tree finch.

=== Petrel colony ===
Cerro Pajas hosts the island's most important colony of Galapagos petrels. In 1981, it was estimated that the petrel colony, comprising about 2000 breeding pairs, was declining by 33% every year, due to predation by black rats, cats and other introduced species. The colony is also threatened by introduced plants, such as Lantana camara L., which was introduced to the island in 1938. In 1982, the World Wildlife Fund funded a five-year conservation programme to control rats, cats, pigs, goats and donkeys at the colony.

Prior to 1984, the residents of Floreana had declared Cerro Pajas a "Protected Area", an initiative led by local conservationist Felipe Cruz. In the early 1980s, conservationists launched the first programme to control introduced rats at Cerro Pajas, to improve the petrels' breeding success. This programme was started by Malcolm Coulter, an ornithologist at the Charles Darwin Research Station, and continued in its early years by Felipe Cruz and American naturalist Tina Beach. In 1983, the first year in which rats were controlled, the petrels' overall nesting success rose from 31% to 46%, despite high rainfall that collapsed many of the petrels' burrows. The following year, breeding success improved even more, with 72 chicks fledged across 100 nests. Targeted hunting of cats, goats, donkeys and pigs also reduced disturbance of petrel nests. Throughout the 1980s, continued rat baiting allowed the petrel colony to maintain high levels of nesting success.

== Gallery ==
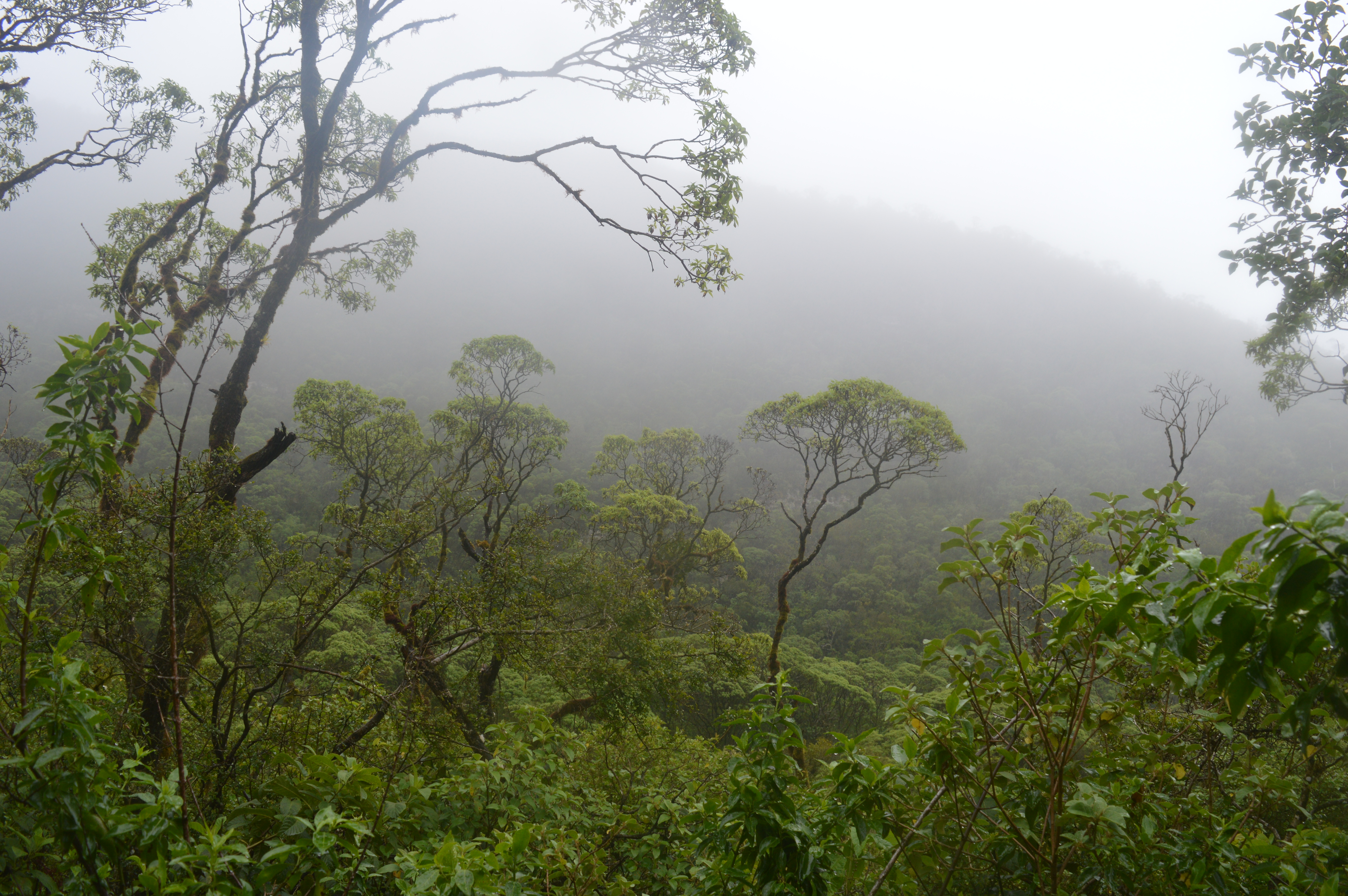
Scalesia forest inside the Cerro Pajas crater

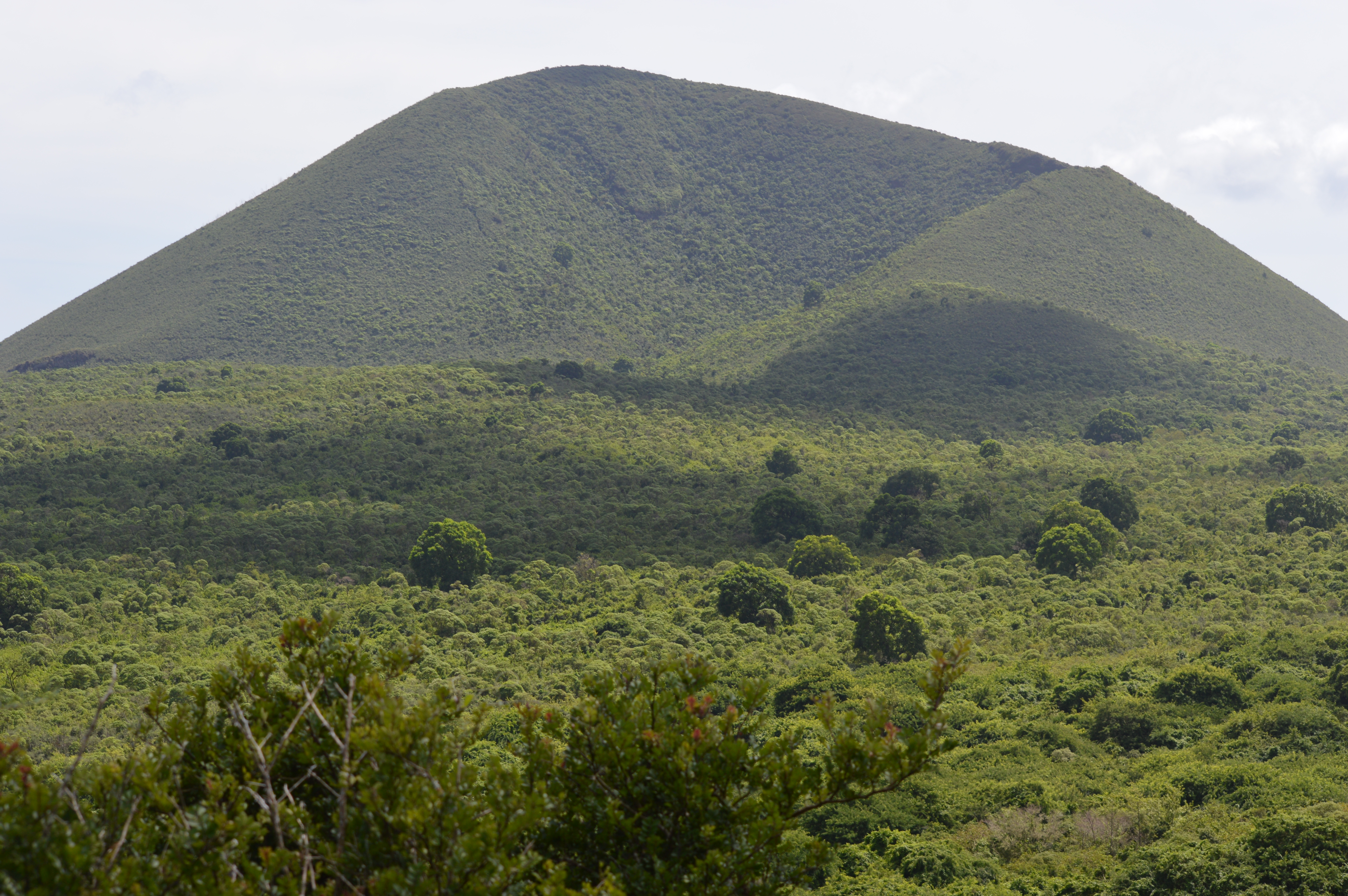
Cerro Pajas photographed from Asilo de la Paz, showing its volcanic crater

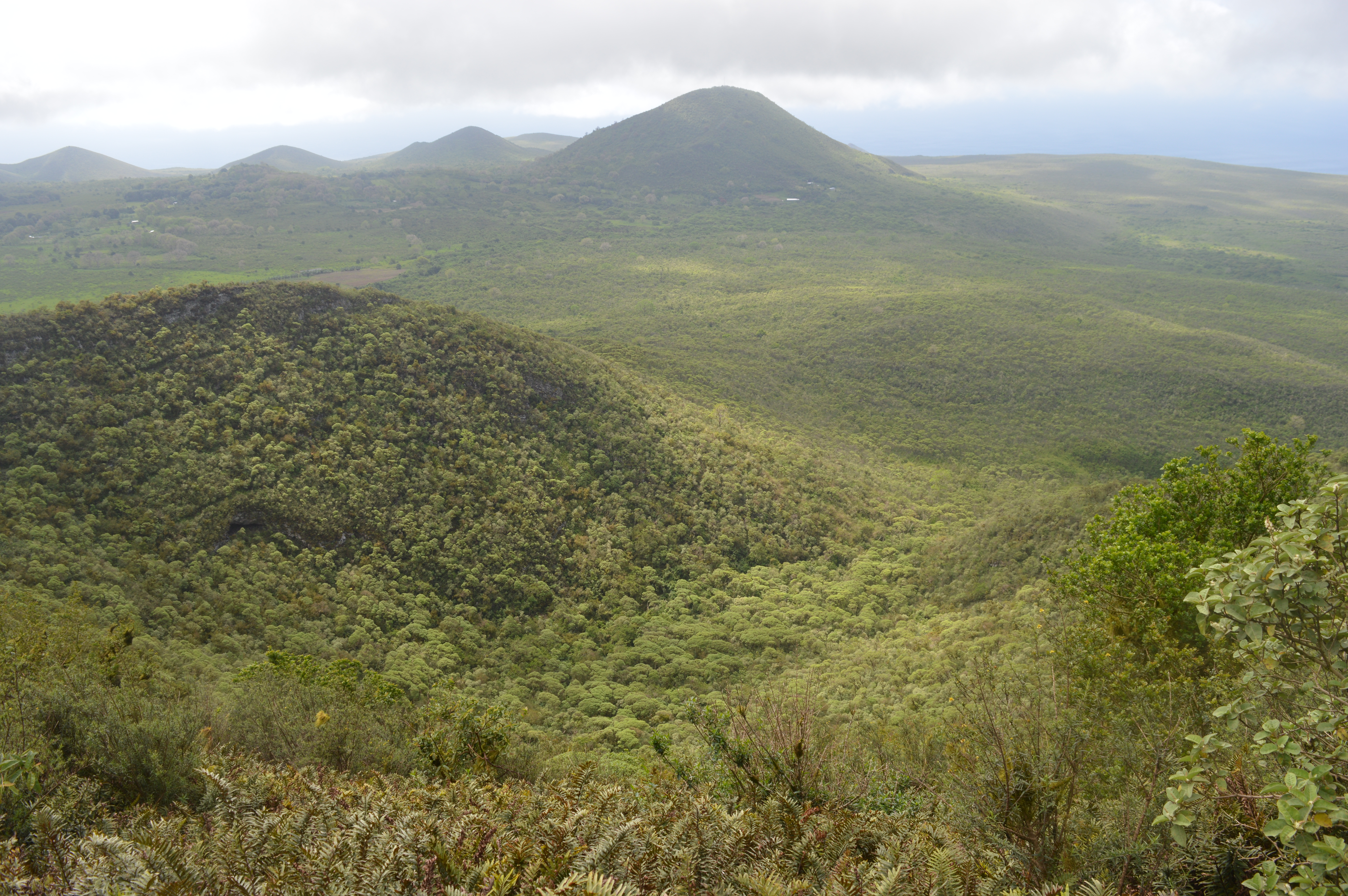
Looking down on Cerro Pajas crater

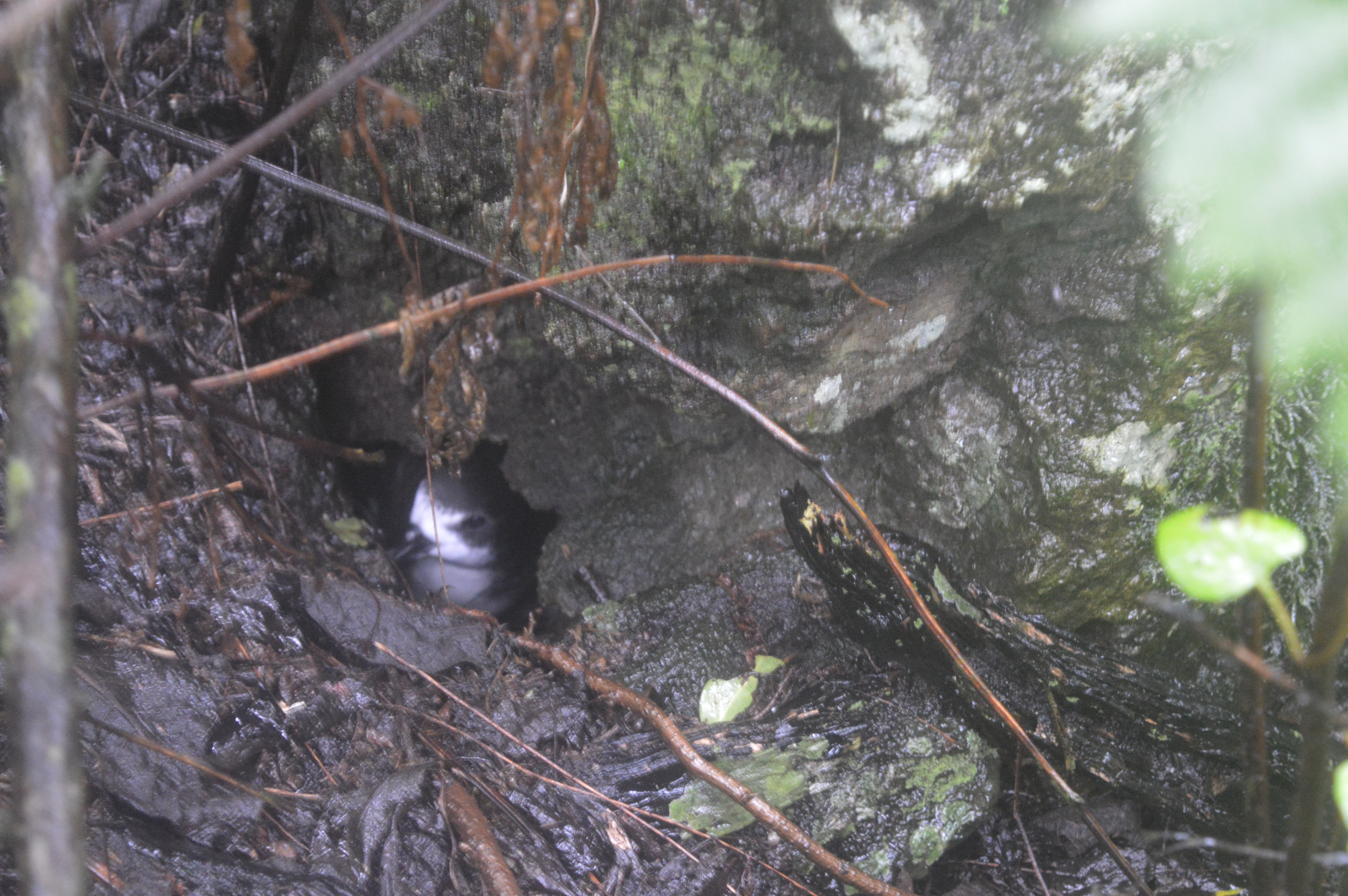
Galápagos petrel nesting under a boulder at Cerro Pajas

== See also ==
- Asilo de la Paz
