= Dore Strauch =

German woman who lived in relative isolation for c. five years

- Strauch with Ritter
- Born: 1900; Cologne, Germany
- Died: 1943 (aged 42–43); Berlin, Germany

Dore Strauch Koerwin (1900–1943) was a German woman known for living on Floreana Island with her partner, Friedrich Ritter, in relative isolation for approximately five years.

== Biography ==
Born in 1900, Strauch grew up in Berlin and felt greatly connected to nature. At age 18, she became interested in the work of German philosopher Friedrich Nietzsche. After reading the work of Arthur Schopenhauer, she decided to eat only figs for over a year.

By age 23, Strauch married a schoolteacher who was twice her age.

Strauch became very ill and was hospitalized for over a year, ultimately being diagnosed with multiple sclerosis. While hospitalized, she fell in love with one of her physicians, Friedrich Ritter, who was also fond of Nietzsche. Wishing to better understand the meaning of life, the couple decided to leave their spouses behind and move to the Galápagos Islands, throwing a dinner party to the four of them before leaving. Despite Ritter's training in medicine, he did not bring medical supplies to the Islands, believing that willpower could heal all ailments. They arrived on Floreana Island on 15 September 1929, quickly establishing a homestead they name Friedo. For a few years, they remained in isolation, though occasionally hosted famous individuals who were visiting the Galapagos, such as Eugene F. McDonald, founder of Zenith Radio, who provided the couple with goods. During this time, international publications shared about their experience, comparing them to Adam and Eve in the Garden of Eden. They were also nudists and vegetarians.

In August 1932, Strauch and Ritter were joined by the Wittmer family, including Albert Charles (Heinz) and Margret, as well as their son Harry. Upon arrival, Margret was pregnant, giving birth to her son Rolf in a cave. Strauch and Ritter had the family establish their own homestead. Later, the two groups were joined by "Baroness" Eloise Wagner de Bousquet and her three lovers: Felipe Valdivieso, Rudolph Lorenz, and Robert Philippson. The Baroness's goal was to establish a hotel on the island. Valdivieso left the island shortly after. On March 19, 1934, the Baroness and Phillipson disappeared, presumed dead. Lorenz later escaped via boat, though the boat was eventually lost at sea. Ritter, a vegetarian, is stated to have died from food poisoning after eating undercooked chicken on 21 November 1934, though some accounts state he died from a stroke, pneumonia, or heart disease. Strauch left the island on December 23, 1934.

After returning to Germany, Strauch wrote a memoir, Satan Came to Eden, about her experiences on Floreana Island, in which the titular 'Satan' refers to the Baroness. Harper & Brothers published the book in 1936. In 1959, Margret Wittmer published, Floreana: A Woman's Pilgrimage to the Galapagos, which contradicted some of the details Strauch shared in Satan Came to Eden.

Strauch died in 1943 in Berlin from complications of multiple sclerosis.

== In popular media ==
The mystery of what happened on Floreana Island has been the subject of interest. The 2013 documentary film The Galapagos Affair overviews the events, with Australian actress Cate Blanchett voicing Strauch. The dramatized 2024 film Eden features Vanessa Kirby as Strauch.

== Publications ==
- Satan Came to Eden: A Survivor's Account of the "Galapagos Affair", as Told by Dore Strauch to Walter Brockmann. New York: Harper & Brothers. 2014 [1936].
