= Floreana Island =

Island in Ecuador's Galápagos Archipelago

Floreana Island (Charles Island)
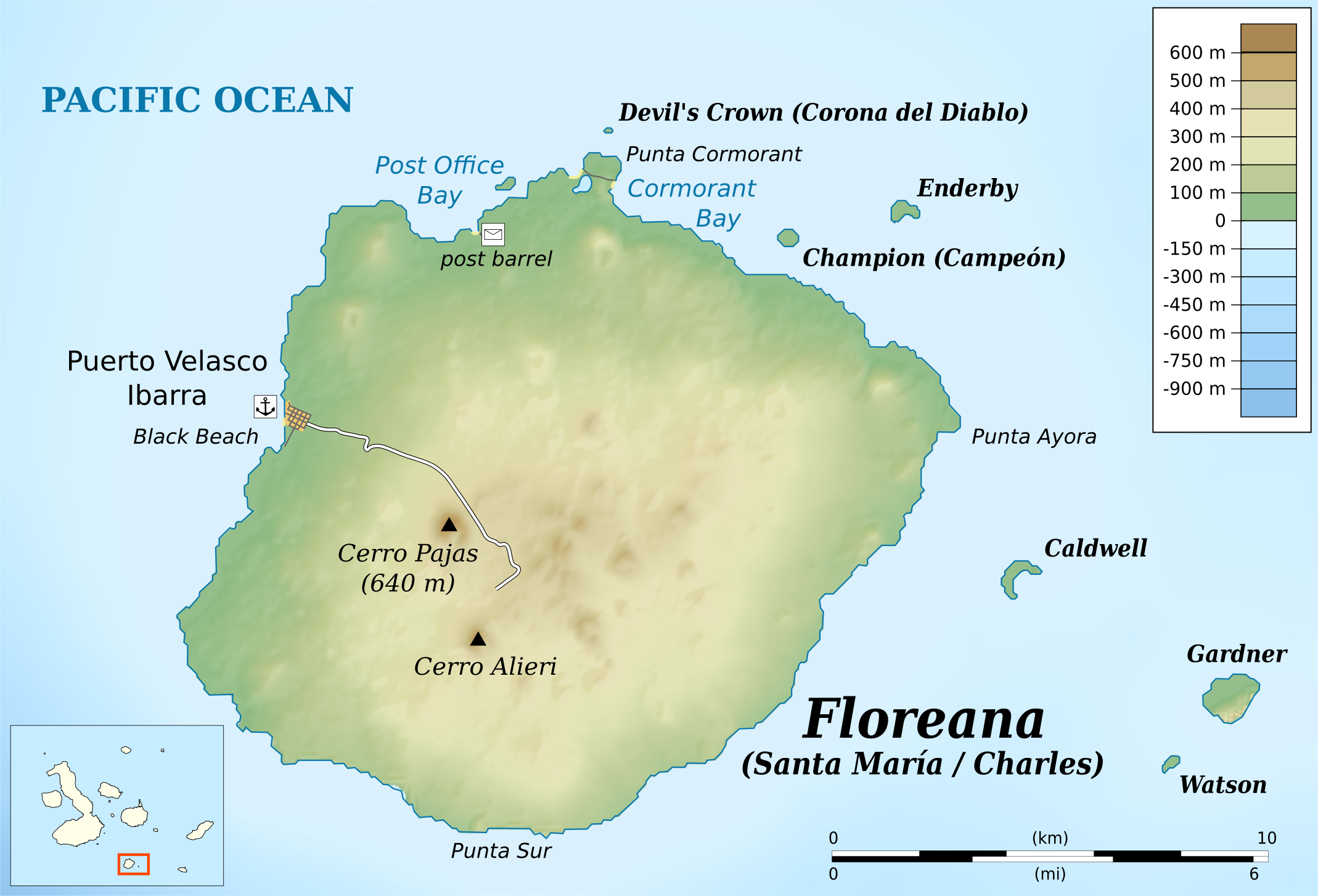
- Topographic map of Floreana

- Location within Galápagos Islands

Geography
- Location: East Pacific Ocean
- Coordinates: 1°17′51″S 90°26′03″W
- Archipelago: Galápagos Islands
- Area: 173 km^{2} (67 sq mi)
- Highest elevation: 640 m (2100 ft)
- Highest point: Cerro Pajas

Administration
- Ecuador
- Province: Galápagos Province
- Canton: San Cristóbal
- Parish: Santa María
- Capital and largest city: Puerto Velasco Ibarra (pop. 100)

Demographics
- Population: 100
- Pop. density: 0.6/km^{2} (1.6/sq mi)

Floreana Island (Spanish: Isla Floreana) is a southern island in Ecuador's Galápagos Archipelago. The island has an area of 173 km^{2} (67 sq mi). It was formed by volcanic eruption. The island's highest point is Cerro Pajas at 640 m (2,100 ft), which is also the highest point of a volcano, as with most of the smaller islands of Galápagos. The island has a population of about 100.

== Names ==
Floreana, sometimes written as Floriana, is named in honor of Juan José Flores, the first president of Ecuador. It was during Flores's presidency that Ecuador took possession of the archipelago. The island was previously known in Spanish as Mercedes Island (Isla Mercedes), sometimes corrupted to Mascarenas, in honor of Flores's wife Mercedes Jijón. It was also known as Santa Maria, after the Virgin Mary and the Santa María, one of Christopher Columbus's ships during his initial voyage. Pinta Island similarly commemorates another one of his ships.

The English pirate William Ambrosia Cowley did not apparently chart or name this island in his 17th-century accounts of the Galápagos but the British captain James Colnett misunderstood some of Cowley's maps and in 1793 gave Floreana the name King Charles and Charles Island, which Cowley had given to Española Island in honor of King Charles II of England, Scotland and Ireland. (He similarly named Santiago after James II.) When it is used, the name Charles Island is still applied following Colnett's misplacement rather than Cowley's original intention.

== History ==
Due to its relatively flat surface, and supply of fresh water, plants, and animals, Floreana was a favorite stop for whalers and other visitors to the Galápagos. Since the 19th century, whalers kept a wooden barrel at Post Office Bay, so that mail could be picked up and delivered to their destination by ships on their way home, mainly to Europe and the United States. Cards and letters are still placed in the barrel without any postage. Visitors sift through the letters and cards in order to deliver them by hand.

The first known permanent residence of the Galápagos was Patrick Watkins who resided on Floreana Island from 1807 until 1809 surviving by hunting, farming, and trading with whalers. It's uncertain if he was forcibly marooned there or if it was by choice. After willingly leaving the island in 1809, he apparently sought to return eventually, with a woman, though was arrested before he was able to do so.

Still known as Charles Island, the island was set afire in 1820 as a result of a prank gone wrong by helmsman Thomas Chappel from the Nantucket whaling ship Essex. Being at the height of the dry season, Chappel's fire soon burned out of control and swept the island. The next day saw the island still burning as the ship sailed for an offshore anchorage and after a full day of sailing the fire was still visible on the horizon. Many years later Thomas Nickerson, who had been a cabin boy on the Essex, returned to Charles Island and found a charred wasteland: "neither trees, shrubbery, nor grass have since appeared." It is believed the fire contributed to the extinction of some species originally on the island.

In September 1835 the second voyage of HMS Beagle brought Charles Darwin to Charles Island. The ship's crew was greeted by Nicholas Lawson, acting for the Governor of Galápagos, and at the prison colony Darwin was told that tortoises differed in the shape of the shells from island to island, but this was not obvious on the islands he visited and he did not bother collecting their shells. He industriously collected all the animals and plants, and speculated about finding "from future comparison to what district or 'centre of creation' the organized beings of this archipelago must be attached."

On 8 April 1888 USS Albatross, a Navy-manned research vessel assigned to the United States Fish Commission, visited Floreana Island during a 2-week survey of the islands.

In 1929, Friedrich Ritter and Dore Strauch arrived in Guayaquil from Berlin to settle on Floreana and sent letters back that were widely reported in the press, encouraging others to follow. In 1932, Heinz and Margret Wittmer arrived with their son Harry from Germany, and shortly afterwards their son Rolf was born there, the first person known to have been born in the Galápagos. Later in 1932, the Austrian "Baroness" Eloise von Wagner Bosquet arrived with two German companions, Robert Philippson and Rudolph Lorenz, as well as the Ecuadorian guide Manuel Valdivieso Borja. A series of strange disappearances and deaths (including possible murders) and the departure of Strauch then left the Wittmers as the sole remaining inhabitants of the group who had settled there. They set up a hotel which is still managed by their descendants. Mrs. Wittmer wrote an account of her experiences as Floreana: A Woman's Pilgrimage to the Galápagos. While residing in Tahiti in 1935, Georges Simenon wrote the novel Ceux de la Soif, which recounts these events in fictionalized form. The story was first published as a feuilleton in the newspaper Le Soir between 12 December 1936 and 1 January 1937, and as a novel by Gallimard in 1938. Simenon's novel was adapted for television in 1989, by Laurent Heynemann. A documentary film recounting these events, The Galapagos Affair, was released in 2013, and a fictionalized film Eden premiered at the Toronto Film Festival in 2024.

Asilo de la Paz, located in the highlands of Floreana Island, was the site of the island's first human settlement and is now among its most popular tourist attractions.

The demands of these visitors, early settlers, and introduced species devastated much of the local wildlife with the endemic Floreana tortoise being declared extinct and the endemic Floreana mockingbird becoming extirpated on the island (the few remaining are found on the nearby islands of Gardiner and Champion).

== Geology ==
Floreana is a shield volcano, which has erupted alkaline basalts since 1.5 Ma. It is the southernmost island in the Galapagos Archipelago, and a 3,400 m submarine escarpment 10 km south of the island forms the southern boundary of the Galapagos Platform. There are over 50 scoria cones onshore and 6 tuff cones offshore. Mostly composed of tephra, these cones are the origin of the A'a lava flows. The oldest flows are on the northern end of the island, while the youngest (26 ka) are on the southern end. Cerro Pajas, the tallest inactive volcano on the island, is the origin of the largest lava flow (272 ka).

== Wildlife ==
The island has been recognised as an Important Bird Area (IBA) by BirdLife International. It supports one of the main colonies of critically endangered Galápagos petrels in the archipelago, with about 350 nests scattered beneath a dense vegetation among the rocks. Medium tree finches, also critically endangered, are endemic to the island. Other significant species include endangered marine animals such as the lava gull, the Galapagos penguin, the Galapagos sea lion, the Marine iguana, the Magnificent frigatebird fregata magnificens magnificens, the Green sea turtle, and the Sally Lightfoot crab. Along with various endangered land animals such as the American flamingo, the Large tree finch, the Floreana lava lizard, the Short-eared owl Asio flammeus galapagoensis the Small ground finch, the Medium ground finch, the Common cactus finch geospiza scandens intermedia, and as of 2025 the Galapagos crake was rediscovered on the island. At one point in time several other animals that have become locally extinct also once lived on the island such as the Floreana mockingbird, the Galapagos racer Pseudalsophis biserialis biserialis, the Vegetarian finch, the Darwin's flycatcher Pyrocephalus nanus nanus, the Large ground finch, the sharp-beaked ground finch, the Grey warbler-finch Certhidea fusca ridgwayi, the Galapagos American barn owl tyto furcata punctatissima, and the Galapagos hawk. Today, restoration and Rewilding projects are underway to reintroduce these animals. As of February 20, 2026, 185 selectively bred hybrids of the extinct Floreana giant tortoise, and the Vulnerable volcan wolf giant tortoise Chelonoidis becki "from nearby Isabela Island" that carry between 40% to 80% of the extinct subspecies have been released back to florena's ecosystem to kick start the rewilding efforts, with future reintroductions being planned for more species such as the floreana mocking bird, Galapagos racer snake, vegetarian finch, and the Darwin's flycatcher.

When Charles Darwin visited the island in 1835, he found no sign of its native tortoise and assumed that whalers, pirates, and human settlers had wiped them out. Since about 1850, no tortoises have been found on the island (except for one or two introduced animals kept as pets by the locals), and the International Union for Conservation of Nature classified the Floreana giant tortoise (Chelonoidis elephantopus sometimes called Chelonoidis nigra) as extinct. However, it may be that there are pure Floreana tortoises living on other islands in the archipelago.

A Global Environment Facility project in the islands with Conservation International Ecuador as the project agency includes ecosystem-restoration measures such as invasive-vertebrate eradication on Floreana Island. Which was designed to eradicate every invasive species of animal that people brought to the island which included Feral goats, Donkeys, Cattle, Feral cats, and the major focus being the introduced Rats and Mice that plagued the island.

== Points of interest ==
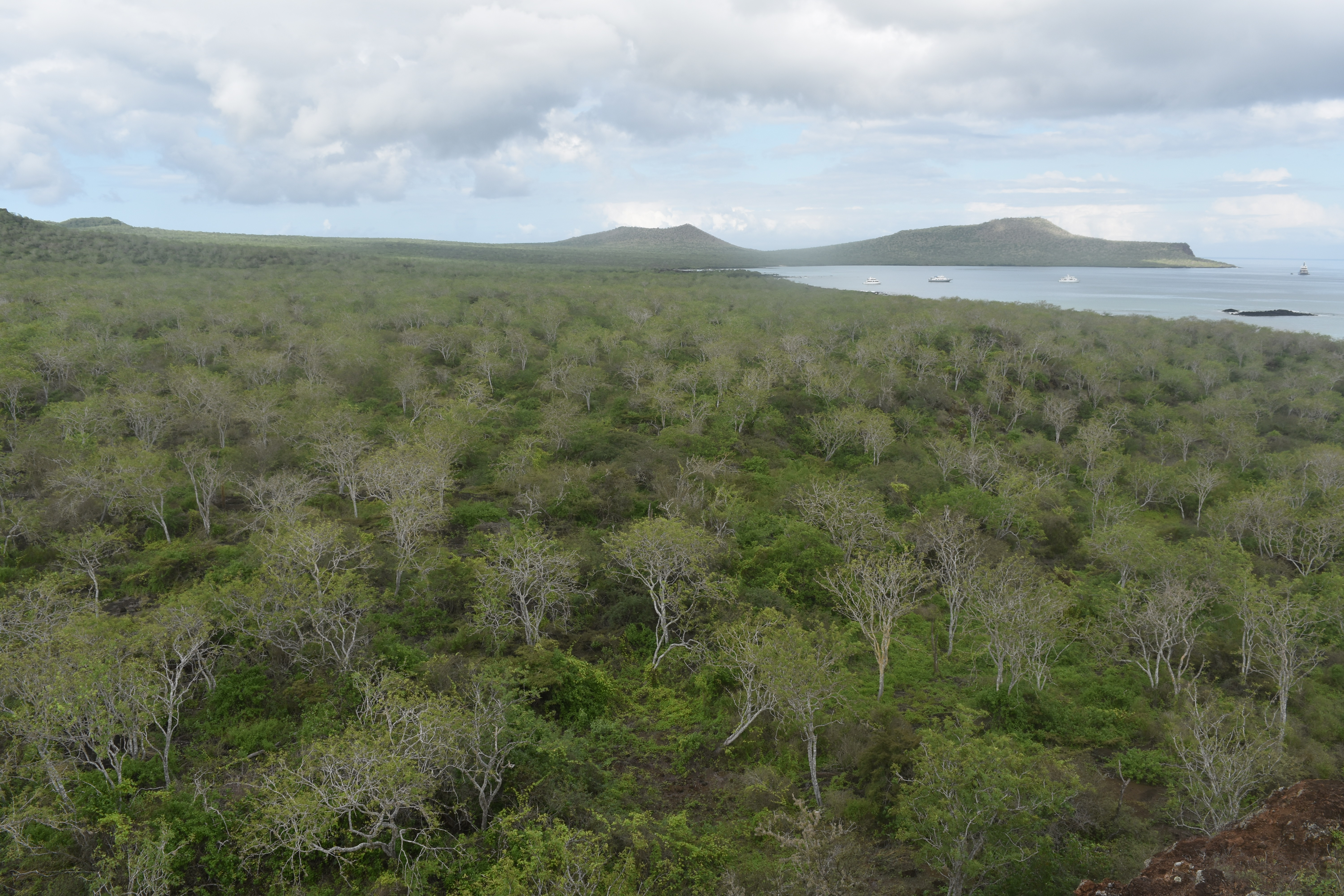
View of Post Office Bay from Mirador de la Baronesa (Baroness's Lookout)

- A favorite dive and snorkeling site, "Devil's Crown", located off the northeast point of the island, is an underwater volcanic cone, offering the opportunity to snorkel with schools of fish, sea turtles, sharks and Galapagos sea lions, which are abundant amongst the many coral formations found here.
- At Punta Cormorant, there is a green olivine beach to see sea lions and a short walk past a lagoon to see American flamingos, rays, sea turtles, and Grapsus grapsus (Sally Lightfoot) crabs. Pink flamingos and green sea turtles nest from December to May on this island. The "joint footed" petrel is found here, a nocturnal sea bird which spends most of its life away from land.
- Post Office Bay provides visitors the opportunity to send post cards home without a stamp via the over 200-year-old post barrel and other travelers.
- A miniature football field, complete with goals, at the end of Post Office Bay, is used by tour boat crews and their tourists.

== Gallery ==
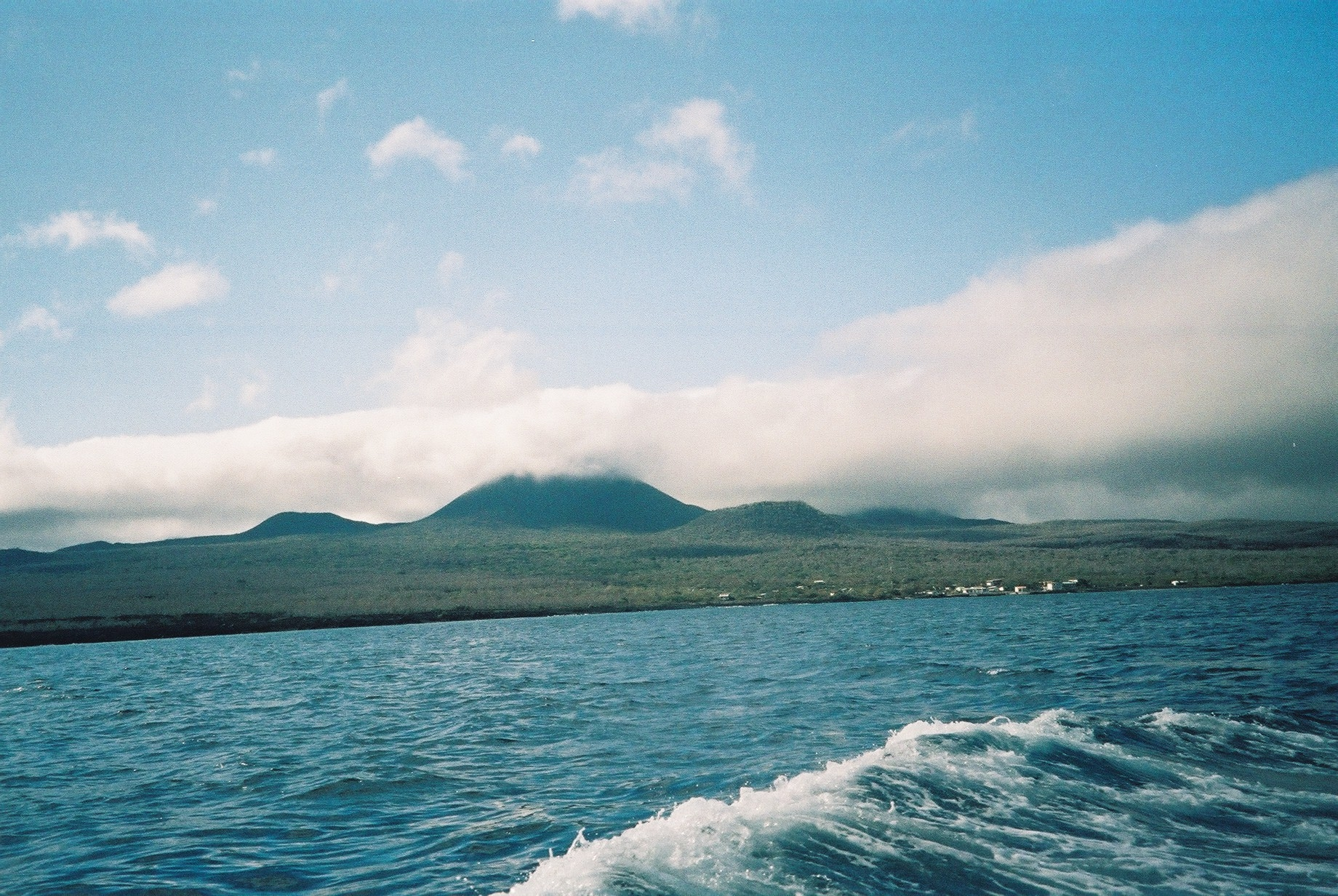
Floreana Island

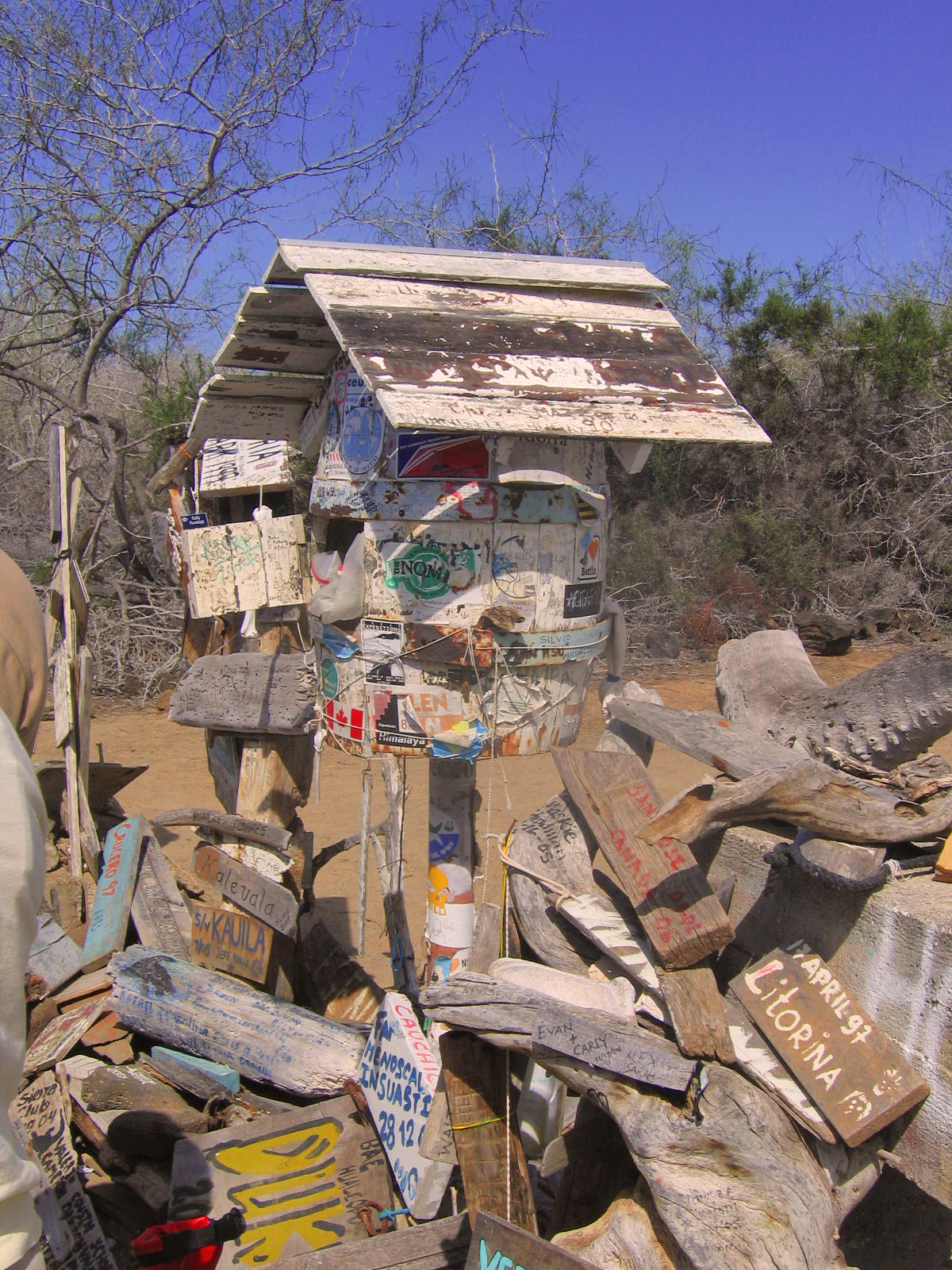
Post Barrel

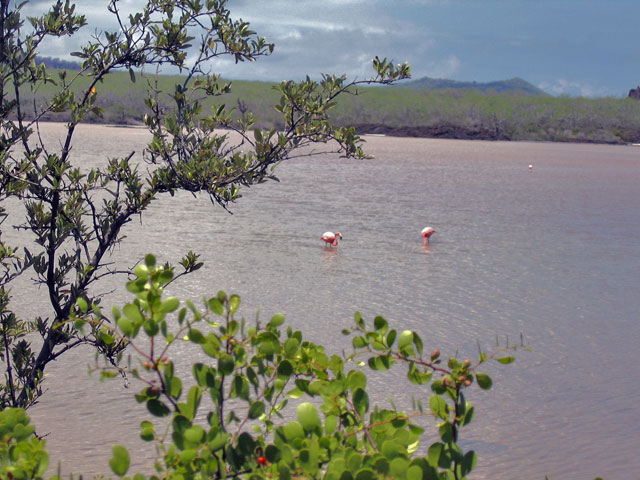
Punta Cormorant with American flamingos
