= Linda Newson =

Linda Ann Newson, FBA, OBE, is a historical geographer, and emeritus professor of King's College London. In 2015 she received the Order of the British Empire for services to Latin American studies. She has also been awarded the Carl O. Sauer Award for Distinguished Scholarship, the Preston E James Lifetime Achievement Award, and the Royal Geographical Society's Back Award.

== Life ==
Linda Ann Newson is a historical geographer, and a specialist in Latin American studies. She earned both a Bachelor of Arts and a doctorate in geography at University College London, before teaching at King's College London from 1971 until 2011. She was appointed full professor in 1994. Newson has a particular interest in the impact of colonisation on indigenous peoples, especially how Old World diseases affect demographics. She publishes in both English and Spanish.

Newson is an emeritus professor at King's College London. She was Head of the School of Humanities at King's College from 1997 to 2000. and was director of the Institute of Latin American Studies, School of Advanced Study, University of London.

Newson is a Fellow of Gresham College, and was elected a Fellow of King's College London in 2001. She is a Fellow of the British Academy.

Newson has served as a trustee of Canning House, and as an AHRC Panel member, and as a member of the International Advisory Panel on the Endangered Archives Programme, at the British Library.

== Honours and awards ==
Newson received the Carl O. Sauer Award for Distinguished Scholarship from the Conference of Latin Americanist Geographers, USA in 1992. In 2017 the conference awarded her the Preston E James Life-time Achievement Award. The Royal Geographical Society awarded her the Back Award in 1993 "for her contributions to the historical geography of Latin America".

In the 2015 Queen's Birthday Honours she received the Order of the British Empire (OBE) for services to Latin American studies.
