= Berkeley School of Latin Americanist Geography =

- Founders: Carl O. Sauer
- Parent institution: University of California, Berkeley
- Location: Berkeley, California, United States

The Berkeley School of Latin Americanist Geography was founded by the American geographer Carl O. Sauer. Sauer was a professor of geography at the University of California at Berkeley from 1923 until becoming professor emeritus in 1957 and was instrumental in the early development of the geography graduate program at Berkeley and the discipline of geography in the United States. Each generation of this research school has pursued new theoretical and methodological approaches, but their study of the peoples and places of Latin America and the Caribbean has remained the common denominator since the early 20th century. Carl O. Sauer himself did not develop a particular interest in Latin America before 1925, when Oskar Schmieder, a German geographer, disciple of Alfred Hettner, and expert in Latin American regional geography, arrived at Berkeley, coming from Córdoba, Argentina, to work as an associate professor. Obviously, his interest awoke during Schmieder's presence between 1925 and 1930. After Schmieder's departure in 1930, Carl O. Sauer began to offer seminars on the regional geography of Latin America.

== First Generation ==
Sauer graduated many doctoral students, the majority completing dissertations on Latin American and Caribbean topics and thereby founding the Berkeley School of Latin Americanist Geography. Sauer's Ph.D. students who completed dissertations on Latin American and Caribbean topics are Fred Kniffen (1930), Peveril Meigs (1932), Donald Brand (1933), Henry Bruman (1940), Felix W. McBryde (1940), Robert Bowman (1941), Dan Stanislawski (1944), Robert C. West (1946), James J. Parsons (1948), Edwin Doran (1953), Philip Wagner (1953), Brigham Arnold (1954), Homer Aschmann (1954), B. LeRoy Gordon (1954), Gordon Merrill (1957), Donald Innis (1958), Carl Johannessen (1959), Clinton Edwards (1962), and Leonard Sawatzky (1967).

== Second Generation ==
Of Sauer's doctoral students, James J. Parsons became the most prolific in terms of directing Latin Americanist doctoral dissertations. He remained at the University of California at Berkeley and produced many of the Ph.D.s in the second generation of the Berkeley School of Latin Americanist Geography: Campbell Pennington (1959), William Denevan (1963), David Harris (1963), Thomas T. Veblen (1975), and Karl Zimmerer (1987).

== Third Generation ==
One of the second generation, William Denevan, became a professor at the University of Wisconsin–Madison and, in turn, produced the majority of the third generation. Denevan's Ph.D. students who completed dissertations on Latin American topics are, among others, Daniel W. Gade (1967; co-chaired), Bernard Nietschmann (1970), Roger Byrne (1972), Roland Bergmann (1974), Billie Lee Turner II (1974), Stuart White (1981), Hildegardo Córdova (1982), Gregory Knapp (1984), Kent Mathewson (1987), John M. Treacy (1989), and Oliver Coomes (1992).

== Subsequent Generations ==
A member of the fourth generation, William E. Doolittle studied with Billie Lee Turner II, a prominent member of the third generation. Turner has graduated almost 50 PhD students, many working in the Americas like Anthony Bebbington, who has over 25 'fifth generation' graduated students Doolittle earned a Ph.D. in 1979, became a professor in the Department of Geography and the Environment at University of Texas at Austin, and is one person to extend the school into the fifth generation. Doolittle's Ph.D. students who completed dissertations on Latin American topics are Dean P. Lambert (1992), Andrew Sluyter (1995), Emily H. Young (1995), Eric P. Perramond (1999), Phil L. Crossley (1999), Jerry O. (Joby) Bass (2003), Maria G. Fadiman (2003), and Matthew Fry (2008).

Several of the fifth generation hold faculty positions in university departments with doctoral programs, and a sixth generation is now emerging. They are applying new approaches and research questions to the study of the peoples and places of Latin America and the Caribbean.

== See also ==
- List of geographers
