= Andrew Sluyter =

American social scientist (born 1958)

- Born: 1958 (age 67–68)
- Education: The University of Texas at Austin
- Scientific career
- Fields: Geography
- Doctoral advisor: William E. Doolittle

Andrew Sluyter (born 1958) is an American social scientist who currently teaches as a professor in the Geography and Anthropology Department of the Louisiana State University in Baton Rouge. His interests are the environmental history and historical, cultural, and political ecology of the colonization of the Americas. He has made various contributions to the theorization of colonialism and landscape, the critique of neo-environmental determinism, to understanding pre-colonial and colonial agriculture and environmental change in Mexico, to revealing African contributions to establishing cattle ranching in the Americas, and to the historical geographies of Hispanics and Latinos in New Orleans. With the publication of Black Ranching Frontiers: African Cattle Herders of the Atlantic World, 1500–1900 (Yale University Press, 2012) and a 2012–13 Digital Innovation Fellowship from the American Council of Learned Societies, he has joined a growing number of scholars from multiple disciplines working from the perspective of Atlantic History and using the tools of the Digital Humanities. His latest book, Hispanic and Latino New Orleans: Immigration and Identity since the Eighteenth Century (LSU Press, 2015), co-authored with Case Watkins, James Chaney, and Annie M. Gibson, was awarded the 2015 John Brinckerhoff Jackson Book Prize by the American Association of Geographers.

== Background ==
Sluyter received his PhD degree in 1995 from the Department of Geography and the Environment at University of Texas at Austin. In 2004, he earned the James M. Blaut Award in Recognition of Innovative Scholarship from the Cultural and Political Ecology Specialty Group of the Association of American Geographers. From 2005 to 2008, Sluyter was a member of the board of directors of the Conference of Latin Americanist Geographers, and in 2017, received its Carl O. Sauer Distinguished Scholarship Award. From 2007 through 2012, he was associate editor of the Geographical Review. Since 2006 he has served on the United States Geography Commission of the Pan-American Institute of Geography and History of the Organization of American States. Sluyter currently serves as the co-editor-in-chief of Journal of Historical Geography and as executive director of the Conference of Latin Americanist Geographers.

== Students ==
Geographers who have studied with him include Case Watkins (PhD 2015), now a faculty member at James Madison University; Jamie Worms, now a faculty member at Georgia State University; James P. Chaney (PhD 2013), now a faculty member at Middle Tennessee State University; Amy E. Potter (PhD 2011), now a faculty member at Armstrong Atlantic State University; and Richard Hunter (PhD 2009), now a member of the geography faculty of the State University of New York at Cortland.

== Publications (selection) ==
=== Books ===
- Colonialism and Landscape: Postcolonial Theory and Applications (New York: Rowman & Littlefield, 2002).
- Black Ranching Frontiers: African Cattle Herders of the Atlantic World, 1500–1900 (New Haven: Yale University Press, 2012).
- With Case Watkins, James Chaney, and Annie M. Gibson, Hispanic and Latino New Orleans: Immigration and Identity since the Eighteenth Century (Baton Rouge: Louisiana State University Press, 2015).

=== Journal articles ===
- Intensive Wetland Agriculture in Mesoamerica: Space, Time, and Form, Annals of the Association of American Geographers 84 (1994): 557-84. doi:10.1111/j.1467-8306.1994.tb01877.x
- The Making of the Myth in Postcolonial Development: Material-Conceptual Landscape Transformation in Sixteenth-Century Veracruz, Annals of the Association of American Geographers 89 (1999): 377–401. doi:10.1111/0004-5608.00154
- Colonialism and Landscape in the Americas: Material/Conceptual Transformations and Continuing Consequences, Annals of the Association of American Geographers 91 (2001): 410-29. doi:10.1111/0004-5608.00251
- The Role of Material/Conceptual Landscape Transformation in the Emergence of the Pristine Myth: Insights from Early Colonial Mexico, in Karl S. Zimmerer and Thomas J. Bassett, editors, Geographical Political Ecology (New York: Guilford Press, 2003).
- With Alfred H. Siemens, editors, Native Food Production Knowledges and Practices, Agriculture and Human Values 21 (2004): 101-261. doi:10.1023/B:AHUM.0000029394.78035.78
- Humboldt's Mexican Texts and Landscapes, Geographical Review 96 (2006): 361-81. doi:10.1111/j.1931-0846.2006.tb00256.x
- Blaut’s Early Natural/Social Theorization, Cultural Ecology, and Political Ecology, Antipode 37 (2005): 963-80. doi:10.1111/j.0066-4812.2005.00545.x
- With Gabriela Dominguez, Early Maize Cultivation in Mexico. In: Proceedings of the National Academy of Sciences 103 (2006): 1147–51.
- The Role of Black Barbudans in the Establishment of Open-Range Cattle Herding in the Colonial Caribbean and South Carolina, Journal of Historical Geography 35 (2009): 330-49. doi:10.1016/j.jhg.2008.08.003
- With Sarah A. Radcliffe, Elizabeth E. Watson, Ian Simmons, and Felipe Fernández-Armesto, Environmentalist Thinking and/in Geography, Progress in Human Geography 34 (2010): 98-116. doi:10.1177/0309132509338749
- With Amy E. Potter, Renegotiating Barbuda's Commons: Recent Changes in Barbudan Open-Range Cattle Herding, Journal of Cultural Geography 27 (2010): 129-50. doi:10.1080/08873631.2010.494404
- The Hispanic Atlantic’s Tasajo Trail, Latin American Research Review 45 (2010): 98-120. doi:10.1353/lar.0.0114
- With Richard Hunter, How Incipient Colonies Create Territory: the Textual Surveys of New Spain, 1520s–1620s, Journal of Historical Geography 37 (2011): 288-99. doi:10.1016/j.jhg.2011.01.005
- The Role of Blacks in Establishing Cattle Ranching in Louisiana in the Eighteenth Century, Agricultural History 86, no. 2 (2012): 41-67. doi:10.3098/ah.2012.86.2.41
- With Amy E. Potter, Photo-Journal of Barbuda: A Caribbean Island in Transition. FOCUS on Geography 55: 140-145 (2012). doi:10.1111/foge.12004
- How Africans and Their Descendants Participated in Establishing Open-Range Cattle Ranching in the Americas. Environment and History 21: 77-101 (2015). doi:10.3197/096734015X14183179969782
- With Richard Hunter, Sixteenth-Century Soil Carbon Sequestration Rates Based on Mexican Land-Grant Documents. The Holocene 25: 880-85 (2015). doi:10.1177/0959683615569323
- With Chris Duvall, African Fire Cultures, Cattle Ranching, and Colonial Landscape Transformations in the Neo-Tropics. Geographical Review 106: 294-311 (2016). doi:10.1111/j.1931-0846.2015.12138.x

== See also ==
- List of geographers
- Berkeley School of Latin Americanist Geography
- Environmental determinism
