= Temples of the Earthbound Gods =

2008 book by Christopher Thomas Gaffney

Temples of the Earthbound Gods: Stadiums in the Cultural Landscapes of Rio de Janeiro and Buenos Aires
- Author: Christopher Thomas Gaffney
- Language: English
- Published: January 2008
- Publisher: University of Texas Press
- Publication place: United States
- ISBN: 9780292718807

Temples of the Earthbound Gods: Stadiums in the Cultural Landscapes of Rio de Janeiro and Buenos Aires is a book by scholar and journalist Christopher Thomas Gaffney published by the University of Texas Press in 2008. Relating Brazilian and Argentinian culture with stadiums, Gaffney conducted an analysis of effects of stadiums in changes in culture. Gaffney described stadiums as "historical, economic, political, sociocultural, technological, and globalizing processes as they are expressed on the local level." The book guides through the history of stadiums in general also in Brazil and Argentina. Through Gaffney, stadiums were considered as portrayals of changes.

== Synopsis ==
Gaffney's argument for stadiums is that they tell their own stories. Development and diffusion of sport and stadiums correlate with "political, economic, and geographic processes". When soccer was first introduced in Brazil, it brought cultural influence as well. The popularity of soccer grew as lower or working-class started to play soccer in various ways. As a result, soccer became "civilizing mechanism", leading stadium to become a space of socializing. The author argues stadiums communicate over time and space. They are transformants, monuments, and hubs of the city.

== Critical reception ==
Reviewed by Robert B. Ross in the Geographical Review 101 (2011): 125-127. Ross agreed with him to an extent that stadiums are not a simple space. However, he argued that Gaffney brought an argument to an extent that it is exaggerating. Ross' argument on stadiums was that it does impact on culture but it does not transform or change the culture significantly.

Reviewed in the Journal of Latin American Geography 8 (2009): 235-237. Godfrey appreciates the Gaffney's work since it gave an accessible work for English-readers. He agreed that the usage of stadiums was appropriate in drawing an urban cultural difference between Brazil and Argentina. Ultimately, he highly recommends the book to undergraduate and graduate teachings.
