= Puerto Villamil =

Town in the Galápagos, Ecuador

Coordinates: 0°57′24.52″S 90°58′02.09″W

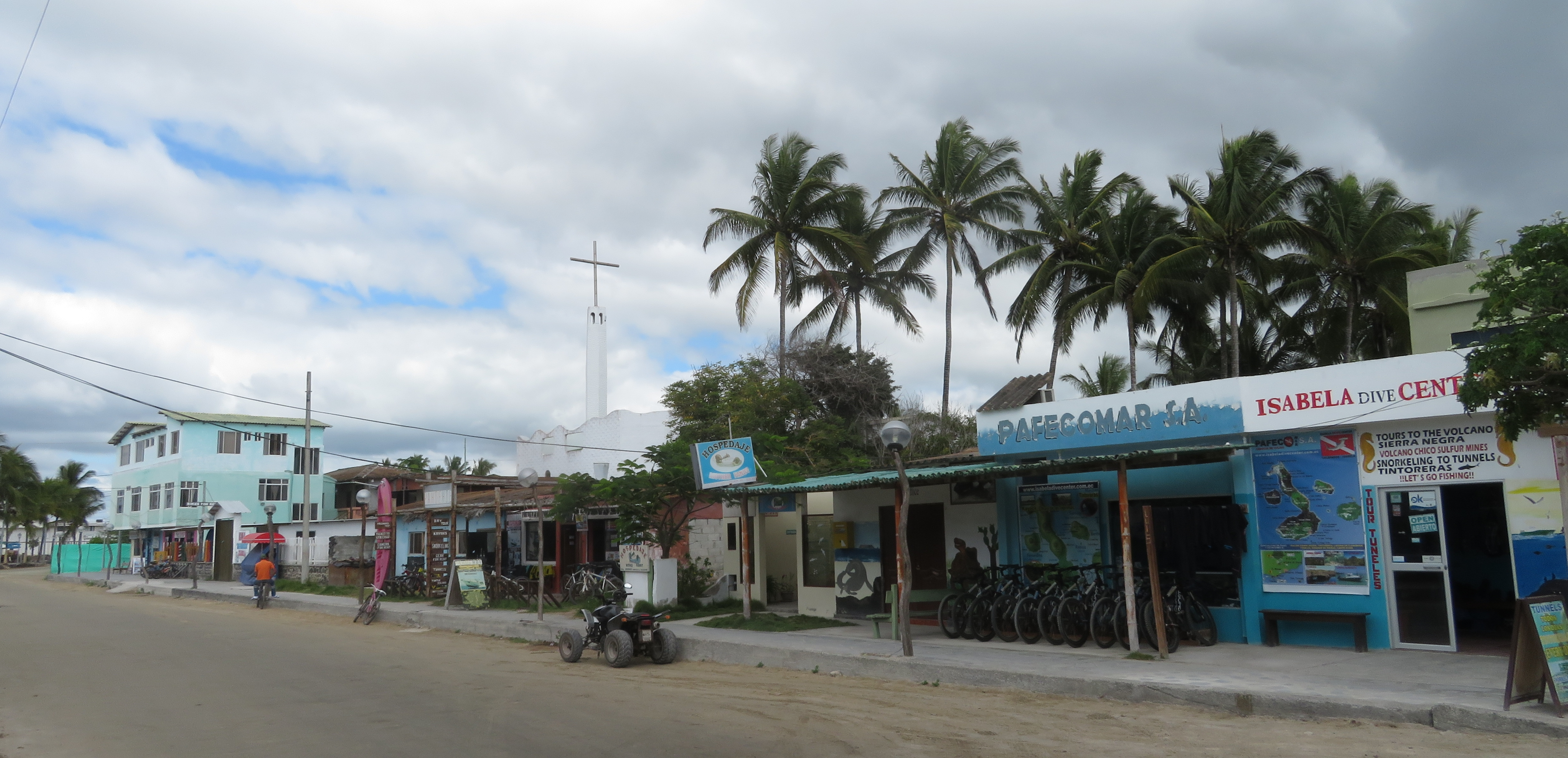
Main Street

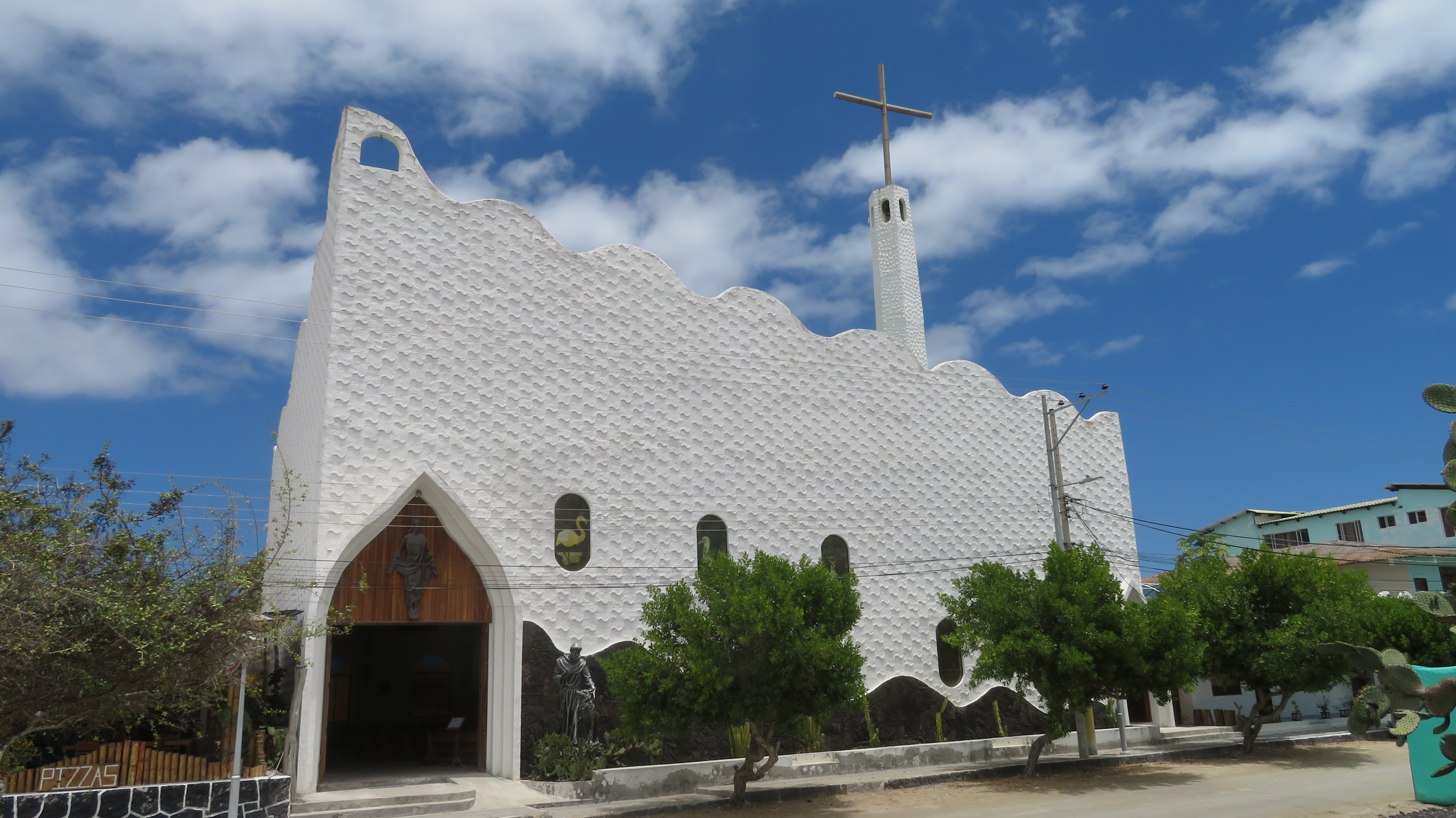
Church Cristo Salvador

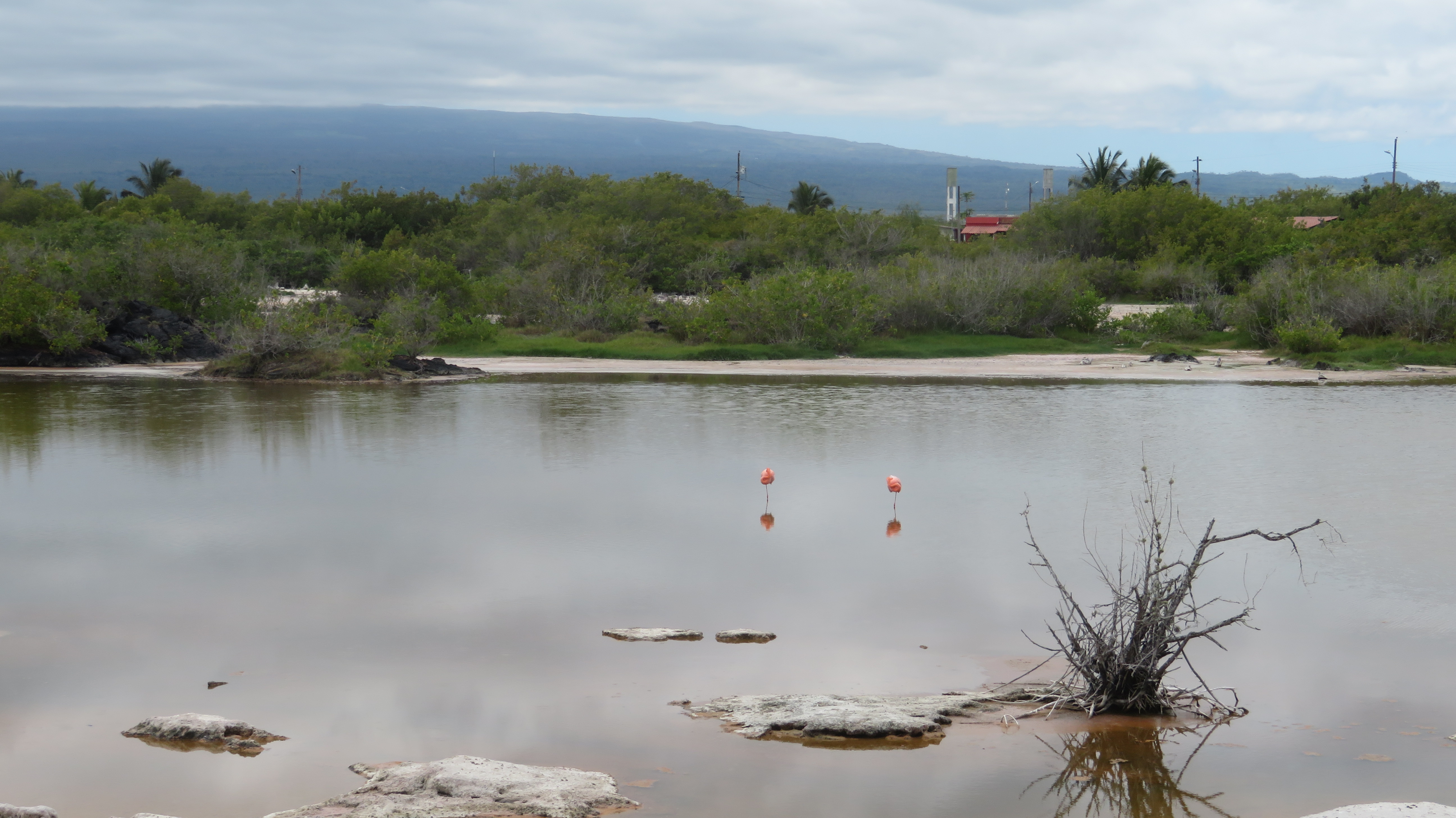
Poza de los Flamingos

Puerto Villamil is a town located on Isabela Island, one of the islands among the Galápagos Islands. It is the largest settlement on the island and has a population of around 2,200.

== Geography and environment ==
Puerto Villamil is located in the western part of the Galápagos Islands. Villamil is located near Sierra Negra. There are mangrove forests near Puerto Villamil. To the southeast of town are a series of small islets including one known as Las Tintoreras where a colony of white tip sharks can often be seen resting in the lava channel.

Several lagoons were removed over the course of urbanization from 1960 to 2003. 80% of the flamingo population in the Galápagos Islands live in the lagoons near Puerto Villamil. Kikuyu grass was introduced in the 1950s and threatens to turn the lagoons near Puerto Villamil into marshes.

== History ==
Antonio Gil attempted to colonize Floreana Island in 1893, but was unsuccessfully and instead founded Puerto Villamil and Santo Tomás. In 1946, 94 criminals were sent to Isabela Island by the Ecuadorian government, but the prison was closed following a rebellion in 1958. A memorial for the prison, Wall of Tears, is in Puerto Villamil.

== Infrastructure ==
The total length of roads in metres rose from 1,440 in 1960, to 5,901 by 1992, 14,589 by 2003, and 19,138 by 2009. An airport to the northeast of the town's centre was completed in 2003.

The Galápagos Islands suffer from a lack of freshwater and the freshwater supply of the town is pumped from two shallow aquifers to the north. There are two private desalination plants in the area and additional supplies of bottled water come from the mainland. 82% of the town are connected to the municipal piped water network while 40% are connected to the sewer system. A report in the Journal of Latin American Geography attributed contaminated water as the cause of around 70% of illinesses in the town.

=== Demographics ===
97% of the archipelago is part of the protected area of the Galápagos National Park while the remaining 3% is reserved for human use. Puerto Villamil is the largest town on Isabela Island and has a population of 2,200. The population of the town accounts for over 88% of the total population of the island. There are ten neighborhoods in Puerto Villamil. A survey in 2009 showed that there were 837 buildings across 115 hectare. 536 of these buildings are single or multi-family housing, with 22% of these also serving as businesses.

== Economy ==
The economy is mainly based on agriculture and fishing. Over the years the government has made policies to move the population away from fishing and into tourist-based activities. This move has been hotly debated, and has created political incidents including one in 2000 when a group of sea cucumber fishermen kidnapped baby tortoises in order to have the government extend their fishing limits.

== Works cited ==
=== Books ===
- Kricher, John; Loughlin, Kevin, eds. (2022). Galápagos: A Natural History Second Edition. Princeton University Press. ISBN 978-0-691-24253-8.

=== Journals ===
- Walsh, Stephen; McCleary, Amy; Heumann, Benjamin; Brewington, Laura; Raczkowski, Evan; Mena, Carlos (2010). "Community Expansion and Infrastructure Development: Implications for Human Health and Environmental Quality in the Galápagos Islands of Ecuador". Journal of Latin American Geography. 9 (3). University of Texas Press: 137–159. doi:10.2307/25765336. JSTOR 25765336.

=== Web ===
- "History of Galápagos". Galapagos Conservancy. Archived from the original on 27 June 2025.
- "Isabela Island, Galapagos". Galápagos Islands. Archived from the original on 27 June 2025.
