= Terry G. Jordan-Bychkov =

American academic (1938–2003)

- Born: Terry Gilbert Jordan; August 9, 1938; Dallas, Texas, U.S.
- Died: October 16, 2003 (aged 65); Austin, Texas, U.S.
- Education: Southern Methodist University (BA); University of Texas (MA); University of Wisconsin (PhD)
- Spouses: Marlis Anderson; Bella Bychkova
- Children: 3

Terry G. Jordan-Bychkov (1938–2003; also published as Terry G. Jordan) was a professor at the Department of Geography and the Environment at University of Texas at Austin and a specialist in the cultural and historical geography of the United States. He authored several influential scholarly books and articles and a widely adopted introductory textbook. Jordan-Bychkov served as president of the American Association of Geographers (AAG) in 1987 and 1988.

== Early life and education ==
Jordan-Bychkov was born on August 9, 1938, in Dallas, Texas, and grew up in University Park, Texas, where he attended Highland Park High School. He majored in geography and German at Southern Methodist University, graduating in 1960. He earned a master's degree at the University of Texas in 1961, and a Ph.D. at the University of Wisconsin in 1965. His doctoral dissertation, German Seed in Texas Soil, focused on German settlers in Texas.

== Career ==
He began his career as an associate professor at Arizona State University Tempe campus, where he was an assistant professor of geography from 1965 to 1969. He served as geography department chair at North Texas State University (now the University of North Texas) from 1969 to 1982. In 1982 he became the Walter Prescott Webb professor of geography at the University of Texas at Austin, where he taught for the rest of his life.

He was elected vice president of the AAG in 1986, and president on April 9, 1987. He was a member of the Pioneer America Society, Texas State Historical Association, Texas Folklore Society, Texas Institute of Letters, and Phi Beta Kappa.

== Personal life ==
He married Marlis Anderson in 1962, and Bella Bychkova in 1997. He died of pancreatic cancer at his home in Austin, Texas, on October 16, 2003. A classroom in the department where he taught is named in his honor.

== Notable publications ==
- 2003, The upland South: The making of an American folk region and landscape. Santa Fe, NM: Center for American Places, and Charlottesville: University of Virginia Press
- 1997, The Mountain West: Interpreting the Folk Landscape (co-author,)
- 1993, North American cattle ranching frontiers: Origins, diffusion, and differentiation. Albuquerque: University of New Mexico Press
- 1989, (with M. Kaups). The American backwoods frontier: An ethnic and ecological interpretation Baltimore: Johns Hopkins University Press
- 1985, American Log Buildings: An Old World Heritage
- 1982, Texas graveyards: A cultural legacy. Austin: University of Texas Press
- 1981, Trails to Texas: Southern Roots of Western Cattle Ranching
- 1978, Texas log buildings: A folk architecture. Austin: University of Texas Press
- 1975, with Lester Rowntree, The Human Mosaic: A Thematic Introduction to Human Geography. San Francisco: Canfield Press
- 1966, German seed in Texas soil: Immigrant farmers in nineteenth century Texas Austin: University of Texas Press
- 1964, Between the forest and the prairie. Agricultural History 38:205-16. Reprinted in Geographic perspectives on America's past: Readings on the historical geography of the United States, ed. David Ward, 50–60. New York: Oxford University Press, 1979

== Awards ==
- Honors Award, Association of American Geographers, 1982
- Southern Teaching Career Fellowship, Council of Southern Universities
- Woodrow Wilson Fellowship
