= Wall of Tears =

Wall of Tears may refer to:

- Wall of Tears (Galápagos Islands), a stone wall built by forced labour in a penal colony
- Wall of Tears, a 1984 album by Gus Hardin
  - "Wall of Tears" (song), this album's title track, also recorded by K.T. Oslin
- Wall of Tears, a feature on Mount Waialeale, a volcano in Hawaii
