= Antonio Fernández del Riego =

Antonio Fernández del Riego (Vilanova de Lourenzá, Lugo, 14 February 1914 – Lugo, 5 May 2008) was a Galician chemist, pharmacist, and oceanographer. He was a professor of chemistry at the University School of Technical Industrial Engineering of Vigo and an oceanographer at the Spanish Oceanographic Institute in Vigo. He played a key role in the localisation of the prehistoric site of Las Gándaras de Budiño and published numerous scientific papers on oceanography and marine pollution.

== Biography ==
=== Education ===
He completed his university baccalaureate in Sciences at the College of Nosa Señora da Antiga in Monforte de Lemos (Lugo, Spain), finishing in 1931. He obtained degrees in pharmacy (1936) and in Chemistry (1942) from the University of Santiago de Compostela. He collaborated for four years as a laboratory assistant to Professor Ricardo Montequi at the Faculty of Pharmacy of Santiago de Compostela.

He served in the army during the Spanish Civil War with the Light Artillery Regiment of A Coruña, stationed in Seville and Salamanca, until being assimilated as a 3rd Class Pharmacist. He was subsequently assigned to Valladolid, Salamanca, Castellón, and Valencia as Head of Pharmacy Services and Head of Pharmacy of Military Hospitals. After the war, he settled in Vigo in 1940 and completed his degree in Sciences at the University of Santiago de Compostela.

=== Professional career ===
He worked as a chemist in the Santa Clara porcelain factory and taught in private schools. He obtained a position as an assistant at the University School of Technical Industrial Engineering of Vigo and passed two consecutive competitive examinations, becoming a Tenured Assistant of Chemistry and almost immediately a professor.

He directed the Military Pharmacy in Vigo and later worked as Technical Director of the Northwest Pharmaceutical Cooperative (COFANO). He also held the position of Meritorious Assistant of Industrial Mastery Schools.

In early 1946, he began working at the Spanish Institute of Oceanography in Vigo, where he later obtained the position of Oceanographer through competitive examination.

He contributed to the rapid resolution of the methyl alcohol poisoning incident in Spain between late 1962 and early 1963, carrying out numerous analyses. He also mentored the French postgraduate student Henri Nonn, assisting him in completing his doctoral thesis on the Rías Baixas.

==== Archaeological Collaboration ====
During his collaboration with Henri Nonn for the latter's doctoral thesis on coastal geomorphology, Fernández del Riego accompanied him in prospections across various areas, including Las Gándaras de Budiño. It was in this context that the Paleolithic site was located; although the first lithic tool was found by Nonn, Fernández del Riego quickly identified the site's significance and facilitated access. Despite his decisive role in the localisation and initial direction, he ceded the primary academic credit to Nonn, who expressed particular gratitude for this collaboration in the introduction to his thesis.

The site was subsequently excavated and studied by Emiliano Aguirre starting in 1963, after being indicated by Fernández del Riego. The discovery of the "Biface de San Mauro" at the site was officially recognized by the Vigo City Council.

He also translated Nina Epton's book Grapes and Granite into Spanish, which was later translated into Galician by his brother, Francisco Fernández del Riego.

=== Scientific Publications ===
Fernández del Riego published over 20 scientific articles in the Bulletin of the Spanish Institute of Oceanography and the journal Investigaciones Pesqueras. His research covered phytoplanktonology, seawater chemistry, metal pollution, and fish product alteration. Notable works include his studies on the seasonal variation of sardines (1948), the use of fish waste for the FAO (1957), and the distribution of lignin in Galician estuaries (1973). He also maintained technical correspondence with international institutions such as the University of California, the FAO, and the American Association of Petroleum Geologists.

His work has been cited in major geological and oceanographic studies, including those by Karl Butzer regarding the stratigraphy of the Paleolithic site of Budiño and historical accounts of the Vigo Oceanographic Center by González-Garcés Santiso.
