= Fred B. Kniffen =

American historical geographer

- Fred B. Kniffen circa 1955. Image from: Gritzner (1994).
- Born: Fred Bowerman Kniffen; January 18, 1900; Britton, Michigan
- Died: May 19, 1993 (aged 93); Baton Rouge, Louisiana
- Education: University of Michigan (B.A.); University of California, Berkeley (Ph.D.)
- Children: 4 (3 sons, 1 daughter)
- Scientific career
- Fields: Geography, Anthropology, Geology
- Workplaces: University of Michigan, University of California, Berkeley, Louisiana State University
- Doctoral advisor: Carl O. Sauer, Alfred L. Kroeber

Fred Bowerman Kniffen (January 18, 1900 – May 19, 1993) was an American geographer and distinguished professor in the Department of Geography and Anthropology at Louisiana State University for over 64 years. Kniffen had a background in anthropology, geography, and geology when he arrived at Louisiana State University in the late 1920s. While there, he made great strides in the Department of Geography and Anthropology that led to the development of new research areas, additional courses, and well trained graduate students. Kniffen stressed the importance of learning and understanding the history of geography, along with blending physical geography and anthropology with cultural geography. During Kniffen's time at Louisiana State University, he was an advocate for interdisciplinary research. Kniffen became a distinguished professor in the department in 1966, later becoming Boyd professor in 1967.

== Early life and education ==
Kniffen was born in Britton, Michigan, on January 18, 1900. Most of his ancestors were of English descent. Kniffen's father had many jobs while he was growing up, some of which included a lumberjack and a brickmaker. His mother was a school teacher who encouraged him to excel in his studies and instilled in him a passion for learning. When Kniffen was six years old, his family moved to Coffeyville, Kansas. There, he excelled in school and was able to skip a grade. The family then moved to Superior, Wisconsin after Kniffen's first year of high school. Once he completed high school, Kniffen enlisted in the army. After the army, Kniffen enrolled at the Superior State Normal School, where he earned college credits for three semesters. While taking courses at the Superior State, Kniffen had a strong desire to earn a university degree. He ultimately ended up transferring to the University of Michigan in Ann Arbor, Michigan. Kniffen graduated with a Bachelor of Arts (B.A.) degree in geology in 1922. After graduation, he bounced around from job to job, some of which included a pipe-fitter and a store keeper. Kniffen developed an interest in geography (especially the human aspect) during his undergraduate years at the University of Michigan as a result of long conversations with Carl O. Sauer. Therefore, he enrolled at the University of California, Berkeley to study geography and anthropology under Carl O. Sauer and Alfred L. Kroeber. Kniffen's doctoral research focused on the Colorado River Delta's cultural and natural landscape. Kniffen graduated with his Doctor of Philosophy (Ph.D.) degree in 1929.

== Career ==
Once Kniffen received his doctorate degree, he promptly took a position as an assistant professor at Louisiana State University in the fall of 1929. During this time, one of Kniffen's main job duties included formalizing the geography curriculum in the department in tandem with other colleagues. Kniffen's teaching load during his early years was very intense (15 – 20 hours per week), and included courses in forest geology, mineralogy, and a handful of courses in geography. In the beginning of Kniffen's career at Louisiana State University, the Departments of Geography and Anthropology were initially separate. Kniffen was the head of the Department of Anthropology before the merge (of Geography and Anthropology). During this time, he taught courses in geography as well. Kniffen's courses were said to be rigorous, but widely popular with students. He was said to have a passion and enthusiasm for geography along with a very strong work ethic.

In 1951, along with colleague Richard J. Russell, Kniffen introduced the culture region concept in geography with the publishing of Culture Worlds. This book remained standard in the discipline for over three decades. Kniffen emphasized cultural landscapes in many of his teaching styles. This was due in large part to his history at the University of California, Berkeley and his work with Carl O. Sauer, Oskar Schmieder, and Alfred L. Kroeber. Perhaps Kniffen's most widely recognized accomplishment and contribution to the discipline was in the topic of folk housing and folk geography. Kniffen's interest in this topic began in the late 1940s as he had several projects dealing with folk geography. Some of which include the folk-ways of sport hunting, geographical myths of Louisiana, and costumes of American working men. In addition to geography and anthropology, Kniffen conducted archaeological research, especially in Louisiana. Specifically, he conducted research on the geomorphic history of Bayou Manchac. There, he discovered three pottery assemblages, corresponding to varying time periods. Lastly, Kniffen contributed greatly to the understanding of French Louisiana by encouraging his students to conduct theses and dissertations on the topic.

Kniffen mentored seven Master of Science (M.S.) students, eight Master of Arts (M.A.) students, and twenty-eight Doctor of Philosophy (Ph.D.) students during the period 1936 – 1970. He was also committee chair on numerous undergraduate theses while at Louisiana State University.

== Death and legacy ==
Kniffen died on May 19, 1993, at the age of 93 in Baton Rouge, Louisiana. He was survived by his wife, three sons, a daughter, five grandchildren, and five great-grandchildren. At the time of Kniffen's death, the flag on campus was flown at half-mast.

A professorship was established in his name in 1991 entitled the "Fred B. Kniffen Professorship". In 1994, a wing of the Geosciences Building on Louisiana State University's campus was named the "Fred B. Kniffen" wing. During the past sixty years, over thirty festschrifts, dedications, and tributes have been made in his honor.

== Awards and honors ==
- 1922: Phi Beta Kappa
- 1929: Scholar, Southwest Laboratory of Anthropology
- 1938 – 1939: Rosenwalk Fellow, Europe
- 1959 – 1962: Councillor, Association of American Geographers
- 1961 – 1963: Consultant, College Geography Committee, Association of American Geographers
- 1963: Chairman, Publications Committee, Association of American Geographers
- 1964 – 1965: Honorary President, Association of American Geographers
- 1966 – 1967: Distinguished Professor, Louisiana State University Foundation
- 1967: Boyd Professor, Louisiana State University
- 1982: First Annual Award, Louisiana Folklore Society

== List of Key Works and Publications ==
- Culture Worlds (1951). New York: Macmillan. (with Richard J. Russell).
- Culture Worlds (1961). New York: Macmillan. (with Richard J. Russell and Evelyn Pruitt).
- Folk Housing: Key to Diffusion (1965). Annals of the Association of American Geographers 55: 549 – 577.
- The Indians of Louisiana (1966). 2nd ed. Gretna, Louisiana: Pelican Publishing Company.
- Why Folk Housing? (1965). Annals of the Association of American Geographers 65: 59 – 63.
- Louisiana: Its Land and People (1968). Louisiana State University Press.

== See also ==
- Berkeley School of Latin Americanist Geography
- Carl O. Sauer
- Alfred L. Kroeber
- Geography
- Cultural Geography
- List of Geographers
