= Billie Lee Turner =

Billie Lee Turner may refer to:

- Billie Lee Turner (botanist) (born 1925), American botanist
- Billie Lee Turner II (born 1945), his son, American geographer
