= Thomas T. Veblen =

Thomas Thorstein Veblen (born 15 November 1947) is an American forest ecologist and physical geographer known for his work on the ecology of Nothofagus (southern beech) forests in the Southern Hemisphere and on the ecology of conifer forests in the southern Rocky Mountains of the U.S.A. He is an Arts and Sciences College Professor of Distinction Emeritus at University of Colorado at Boulder, USA (2006).

== Career ==
Veblen's research focuses on disturbance ecology in the contexts of climate change and human impacts on temperate forest ecosystems in both the Northern and Southern hemispheres. From 1975 to 1979 he was professor of plant ecology in the Forestry School of the Austral University in Valdivia, Chile where he initiated pioneering research on the disturbance ecology and regeneration dynamics of Nothofagus forests. One of his early achievements was the unravelling of how repeated coarse-scale disturbances related mostly to tectonic events control the dynamics of forests in the Andes of southern Chile. His early work developed a conceptual framework which was seminal to the shift from equilibrium to non-equilibrium paradigms in ecology in the 1980s. His early work defined a research agenda for multiple generations of forest ecologists in southern Chile and Argentina including many internationally recognized research leaders who completed their doctoral training with Veblen. His continuing work in the forests of Patagonian Chile and Argentina examines climatic influences on wildfire activity and the effects of introduced mammals on vegetation responses to fire.

In the U.S. Rocky Mountains Veblen has published on the roles of wildfire, bark beetle outbreaks, and wind storms in the dynamics of conifer forests. He published one of the first quantitative studies of interacting disturbance by wildfire, snow avalanches, and bark beetle outbreaks. Using tree ring methods he and his students have reconstructed multi-century records of bark beetle outbreaks and wildfires and related them to interannual climatic variability.

Professor Veblen held a postdoc fellowship with the Forest Research Institute of New Zealand from 1979 to 1981 where he conducted research on the disturbance ecology of beech and conifer forests and the effects of introduced mammals on tree mortality and regeneration in collaboration with Dr. Glenn H. Stewart of the Forest Research Institute. Their papers published in the early 1980s were pivotal to the adoption of non-equilibrium paradigms in plant ecology in New Zealand.

== Honours and awards ==
In 1985 Veblen was awarded a John Simon Guggenheim Memorial Fellowship. Since 1991 Veblen is Honorary Fellow of the Royal Society of New Zealand. In 1992 Veblen received an Honors in Research Award from the Association of American Geographers. In 2000, Veblen was the recipient of a "Carl O. Sauer Distinguished Scholar Award" from the Conference of Latin American Geography (CLAG). In 2008 Veblen was elected a Fellow of the American Association for the Advancement of Science. In 2017 Veblen received the title of Distinguished Professor, the highest honor bestowed by the University of Colorado on its faculty.

== Publications ==
Veblen was a co-editor of The Ecology and Biogeography of Nothofagus Forests, a book published by Yale University Press in March 1996.
