= Carl O. Sauer =

American geographer (1889–1975)

- Born: December 24, 1889; Warrenton, Missouri
- Died: July 18, 1975 (aged 85)
- Known for: The Morphology of Landscape
- Children: Jonathan D. Sauer

Academic work
- Discipline: Geography
- Institutions: University of California at Berkeley
- Doctoral students: Frederick J. Simoons

Carl Ortwin Sauer (December 24, 1889 – July 18, 1975) was an American geographer. Sauer was a professor of geography at the University of California at Berkeley from 1923 until becoming professor emeritus in 1957. He has been called "the dean of American historical geography" and he was instrumental in the early development of the geography graduate school at Berkeley. One of his best known works was Agricultural Origins and Dispersals (1952). In 1927, Carl Sauer wrote the article "Recent Developments in Cultural Geography", which considered how cultural landscapes are made up of "the forms superimposed on the physical landscape".

== Family and education ==
Sauer was born December 24, 1889, in Warrenton, Missouri, the son of German-born William Albert Sauer and Rosseta J. Vosholl. As a child he was sent to study in Germany for five years. He later attended Central Wesleyan College where his father served as the school botanist and taught music and French. The elder Sauer was interested in history and geography and felt there was a strong relationship between the two fields of study. His outlook most likely had a strong influence on his son's perspective. After graduating in 1908, Sauer studied geology briefly at Northwestern University and then moved to the University of Chicago to study geography. There he was influenced by geologist Rollin D. Salisbury and botanist Henry C. Cowles. Sauer wrote his dissertation on the geography of the Ozark Highlands of Missouri (published in 1920) and received his doctorate degree in 1915. Sauer married Laura Lorena Schowengerdt on December 30, 1913; they had two children, a daughter and a son. Their son, Jonathan D. Sauer, became a professor of geography, specializing in plant geography.

== Career ==
In 1915 Sauer joined the University of Michigan as an instructor in geography and was promoted to full professor in 1922. While at Michigan he became involved in public land use policy. He became concerned about the clear-cutting of pine forests in the state and the resulting ecological harm. In 1922 he played a major role in the establishment of the Michigan Land Economic Survey.

In 1923 Sauer left Michigan to become a professor of geography and founding chairman of the Geography Department at the University of California, Berkeley. He replaced Ruliff S. Holway as professor.

He served as chair for more than thirty years, creating a distinctive American school of geography. Shortly after his arrival he began a program of fieldwork in Mexico that continued into the 1940s. Initially he focused on the contemporary landscapes of Mexico but his interests grew to include the early Spanish presence in the region and the prehistoric Indian cultures of northwestern Mexico. He worked closely with other departments, especially anthropology and history.

The scope of Sauer's work expanded to include investigations into the timing of man's arrival in the Americas; the human geography of Native American populations; and the development of agriculture and native crops in the Americas.

== Influence ==
Carl Sauer's paper "The Morphology of Landscape" was probably the most influential article contributing to the development of ideas on cultural landscapes and is still cited today. However, Sauer's paper was really about his own vision for the discipline of geography, which was to establish the discipline on a phenomenological basis, rather than being specifically concerned with cultural landscapes. "Every field of knowledge is characterized by its declared preoccupation with a certain group of phenomena", according to Sauer. Geography was assigned the study of areal knowledge or landscapes or chorology—following the thoughts of Alfred Hettner. "Within each landscape there are phenomena that are not simply there but are either associated or independent of each other." Sauer saw the geographer's task as being to discover the areal connection between phenomena. Thus "the task of geography is conceived as the establishment of a critical system which embraces the phenomenology of landscape, in order to grasp in all of its meaning and colour the varied terrestrial scene". The paper was also influential in poetry: Sauer's representation of landscape as contingent and heterogeneous, and his work's decentering of the human subject, influenced works by Charles Olson, Ed Dorn and J. H. Prynne. A collection of Sauer's letters while doing fieldwork in South America has been published.

Sauer was a fierce critic of environmental determinism, which was the prevailing theory in geography when he began his career. He proposed instead an approach variously called "landscape morphology" or "cultural history". This approach involved the inductive gathering of facts about the human impact on the landscape over time. Sauer rejected positivism, preferring particularist and historicist understandings of the world. He drew on the work of anthropologist Alfred Kroeber and later critics accused him of introducing a "superorganic" concept of culture into geography. Sauer expressed concern about the way that modern capitalism and centralized government were destroying the cultural diversity and environmental health of the world. He believed that agriculture, and domestication of plants and animals had an effect on the physical environment.

After his retirement, Sauer's school of human-environment geography developed into cultural ecology, political ecology, and historical ecology. Historical ecology retains Sauer's interest in human modification of the landscape and pre-modern cultures.

== Honors and awards ==
Sauer received numerous professional awards and honorary degrees:

- Charles P. Daly Medal, American Geographical Society, 1940
- Vega Medal, Swedish Society for Anthropology and Geography, 1957
- Alexander von Humboldt Medal, Berlin Geographical Society, 1959
- Victoria Medal, Royal Geographical Society, 1975
- Phil. D., University of Heidelberg, 1956
- LL.D., Syracuse University, 1958
- LL.D., University of California, Berkeley, 1960
- LL.D., University of Glasgow, 1965

He was named a John Simon Guggenheim Fellow in 1931 and served as a member of the Selection Board of the Guggenheim Memorial Foundation 1936-1965.

He was awarded an Honorary Fellowship from the American Geographical Society in 1935, and its Daly Medal in 1940. He was elected to the American Philosophical Society in 1944.

== Graduate students ==
Sauer graduated many doctoral students, the majority completing dissertations on Latin American and Caribbean topics and thereby founding the Berkeley School of Latin Americanist Geography. The first generation consisted of Sauer's own students: Fred B. Kniffen (1930), Peveril Meigs (1932), Donald Brand (1933), Henry Bruman (1940), Felix W. McBryde (1940), Robert Bowman (1941), Dan Stanislawski (1944), Robert C. West (1946), James J. Parsons (1948), Edwin Doran (1953), Philip Wagner (1953), Brigham Arnold (1954), Homer Aschmann (1954), B. LeRoy Gordon (1954), Frederick J. Simoons (1956), Gordon Merrill (1957), Donald Innis (1958), Marvin W. Mikesell (1958), Carl Johannessen (1959), Clinton Edwards (1962), and Leonard Sawatzky (1967).

Among them, Parsons remained at the University of California at Berkeley and became prolific in directing Latin Americanist doctoral dissertations. His doctoral students formed the second generation of the Berkeley School: Campbell Pennington (1959), William Denevan (1963), David Harris (1963), David Radell (1964), Thomas Veblen (1975), Karl Zimmerer (1987), Paul F. Starrs (1989), John B. Wright (1990), and David J. Larson (1994). Apart from Latin America, Parsons' PhD students such as Alvin W. Urquhart (1962) also worked in Africa.

Denevan became a professor at the University of Wisconsin-Madison and, in turn, produced a third generation: Daniel Gade (1967), Bernard Nietschmann (1970), Roger Byrne (1972), Roland Bergmann (1974), Billie Lee Turner II (1974), Gregory Knapp (1984), Kent Mathewson (1987), John M. Treacy (1989), and Oliver Coomes (1992). Mikesell became a professor at the University of Chicago and also produced a third generation.

A member of the fourth generation, William E. Doolittle studied with Turner, earned the PhD in 1979, became a professor in the Department of Geography and the Environment at University of Texas at Austin, and has extended the school into the fifth generation: Dean P. Lambert (1992), Andrew Sluyter (1995), Emily H. Young (1995), Eric P. Perramond (1999), Phil L. Crossley (1999), Jerry O. (Joby) Bass (2003), Maria G. Fadiman (2003), and Matthew Fry (2008).

== Works ==
Sauer published twenty-one books and more than ninety papers and articles. His works include:

- Geography of the Upper Illinois Valley and History of Development, 1916
- The Geography of the Ozark Highland of Missouri, 1920
- The Morphology of Landscape, 1925
- Basin and Range Forms in the Chiricahua Area, 1930
- The Road to Cibola, 1934
- Themes of plant and animal destruction in economic history, 1938
- Environment and culture during the last deglaciation, 1948
- Agricultural Origins and Dispersals, 1952
- Man's Role in Changing the Face of the Earth: An International Symposium under the Co-chairmanship of Carl O. Sauer, Marston Bates, and Lewis Mumford (edited by William L. Thomas, Jr), 1956
- The Early Spanish Main, 1966
- Northern Mists, 1968
- Sixteenth Century North America: The Land and People as Seen by Europeans, 1971

== See also ==
- Berkeley School of Latin Americanist Geography
- Geographers on Film
- List of geographers
