= Heinz Brücher =

German SS officer and botanist (1915–1991)

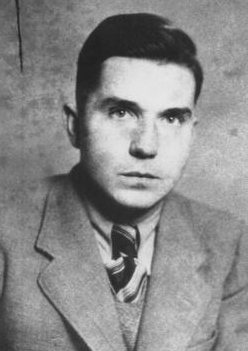
- Portrait from the 1930s
- Born: January 14, 1915; Darmstadt, Grand Duchy of Hesse, German Empire
- Died: December 17, 1991 (aged 76); Mendoza Province, Argentina
- Education: University of Jena, University of Tübingen
- Scientific career
- Fields: Botany, plant breeding, ethnobotany
- Workplaces: University of Tucumán
- Author abbrev. (botany): Brücher

Heinz Brücher (14 January 1915 – 17 December 1991) was a botanist and plant breeder who served as a member of the special science unit in the SS Ahnenerbe in Nazi Germany. He was part of a SS Sammelkommando that raided the plant genome material and seed collections of the Soviet Union. After the Second World War, Brücher moved to South America and worked as a professor of botany in Argentina and other countries in South America. He served as an advisor to UNESCO on biology.

== Biography ==
Brücher was born in Darmstadt and studied Biology at Jena and Tübingen. By the time Brücher graduated in 1934 he was a member (number 3498152) of the Nazi Party. He obtained a doctorate at Tübingen where he studied the genetic differences in reciprocal crosses of Epilobium hirsutum under Ernst Lehmann and supported cytoplasmic inheritance which Lehmann did not believe in. Brücher turned against Lehmann later, and apart from scientific arguments, he also used Lehmann's supposed political views that were against the Nazi Party to bolster his case. Brücher then joined the Institute for Human Hereditary Research and Race Policy at the University of Jena, as an assistant to the Nazi eugenicist Karl Astel. He also worked at the Kaiser Wilhelm Institute for Plant Breeding Research and was keen on crop breeding which he saw as very important for national sustainability. When an expedition was mounted into the Soviet Union in 1941, Brücher then an Untersturmführer (Second Lieutenant) was interested in gathering crop seeds and plant material from the region including those held in Soviet research stations. The proposal was supported by SS-Sturmbannführer Dr Ernst Schäfer and approved by Heinrich Himmler which led to the creation of the SS ''Sammelkommando'' or collection expedition which included Hauptsturmführer Konrad von Rauch, and an interpreter Arnold Steinbrecher. The seeds and plant material collected by the expedition included large parts that had been deposited by Nikolai Vavilov who had already been imprisoned by Stalin. The seeds were maintained at Graz where the SS Institute for Plant Genetics were established at Lannach Castle. Brücher headed subsequent research and worked with a British prisoner of war, William Denton-Venables, a trained botanist who later served as a director of Taylor & Venables, a seed company in Norfolk. In February 1945 Brücher was ordered to destroy the Lannach facility to avoid its capture by advancing Soviet forces, but he refused to follow the orders.

After the war, Brücher moved to Sweden thanks to Sven Hedin's invitation and worked with the Svalof seed company. During this period he married Ollie Berglund, a Swedish plant breeder. Brücher then moved to Argentina which was then under Juan Perón and received there in 1948, a professorship in genetics and botany at University of Tucumán (Tucumán, Argentina). He later worked in Caracas (Venezuela), Asunción (Paraguay) and then in Mendoza and Buenos Aires (Argentina). He also worked in Pretoria in 1964-65 where he claimed to have evidence for white superiority. In 1972 he served as biology advisor to UNESCO.

Brücher wrote a number of books and papers on the history of grain (1950), origin, evolution and domestication of tropical plants (1977) as well as the monograph Useful plants of neotropical origin and their wild relatives (1989). He wrote biographical papers and a book, Ernst Haeckels Bluts- und Geistes-Erbe (1936), on Ernst Haeckel and helped prop him up as an icon for Nazi science ideals. In the 1936 book, he declared that Haeckel was of Nordic origins, making him a visionary. He was critical of Vavilov in his publications possibly because he saw Vavilov as a communist and there had been other German botanists like Elisabeth Schiemann (1881–1972) who had supported his theory while holding anti-Nazi positions. After moving to South America, Brücher focused on ethnobotanical research and worked on the wild relatives of potatoes and beans. He also had an interest in Himalayan barley collected during the Schäfer expedition to Tibet. A species, Solanum brucheri named after him by Donovan Stewart Correll was found later to be a hybrid of S. acaule Bitt. And S. infundibuliforme Philippi (Hawkes and Hjerting, 1969).

Brücher's wife Ollie worked at the University of Caracas. She and her elder son were killed in a road accident in 1972. On 17 December 1991 he was killed on his farm Condor Huasi (or Condor house, though a picture of a motif at its entrance suggests a Nazi eagle) in the district Mendoza (Argentina). His murder was claimed to be the result of a burglary but the case was never closed and no arrests were made. According to Daniel Gade, an associate from the University of Vermont, Brücher, was a vocal opponent of alcohol and drugs. Brücher even used the word "hygiene" when referring to addictions in his publication, a term from Nazi times and personally avoided alcohol and meat. Gade suggests, based on evidence available, that Brücher was working on strains of Fusarium oxysporum to target the cocaine plant and destroy its cultivation, and suggested that drug lords may have found this as a possible motive for his murder. Another possibility was that Brücher had discovered and threatened to disclose financial fraud made by a German-owned company called Fiduciaria Transatlántica Alemana where he served as a consultant. Unlike many other Nazi officers in South America, Brücher did not change his surname. He went by the local name of Don Enrique which was the Spanish form of his first name Heinz (and a cognate of Henry).
