= Las Tintoreras Islet =

Islet in the Galápagos Archipelago

Islote Las Tintoreras

Geography
- Coordinates: 00°58′00″S 90°58′00″W
- Archipelago: Galápagos Islands
- Area: 124 km^{2} (48 sq mi)

Administration
- Ecuador
- Province: Galápagos Province

Demographics
- Population: 0
- Pop. density: 0/km^{2} (0/sq mi)

Las Tintoreras Islet (also called Tintorera or Villamil) is an islet to the south of the bay of Puerto Villamil in the island of Isabela, that forms part of the archipelago and national park of the Galapagos Islands, including administratively in the Province Of Galapagos. It is accessible by a boat trip where iguanas, boobies, penguins and seabirds can be observed.

The name of the islet comes from a channel that is filled during high tide of whitetip reef sharks and tiger sharks, the latter typically referred to as Tintorera. It has an area of 12.4 hectares (0.12 square kilometers), is 68.8 kilometers from the center of the archipelago, and has a coastline of 2.64 kilometers.

== See also ==
- Geography of Ecuador
- Geography of South America
