= Daniel W. Gade =

American Academic

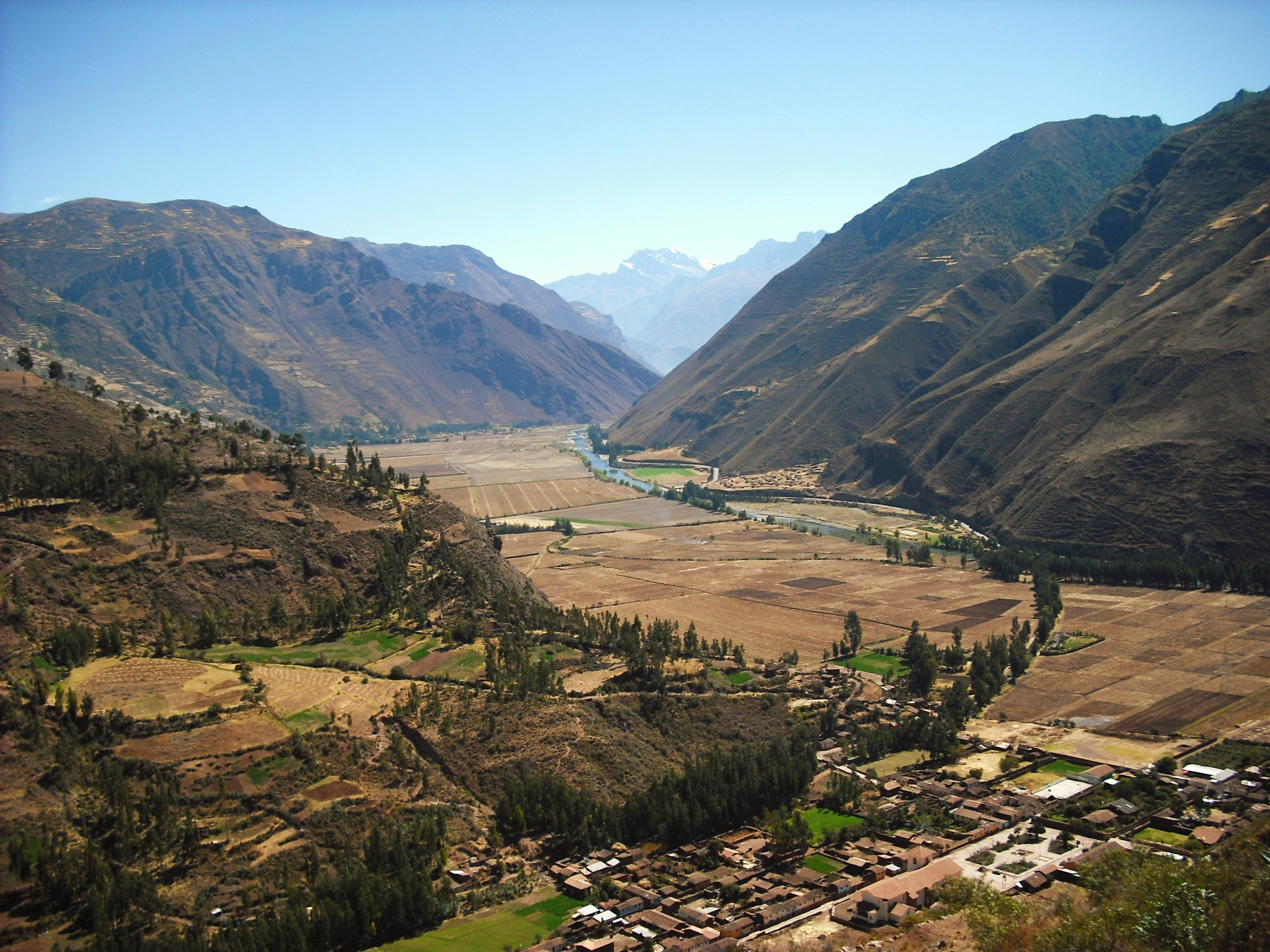
The Urubamba River Valley: central to Daniel W. Gade's scientific life.

Daniel Wynne Gade (September 28, 1936 – June 15, 2015) was a professor of Geography at the University of Vermont and a prominent member of the Berkeley School of Latin Americanist Geography. His main interests were in the fields of cultural geography and historical geography, as well as ethnobotany, cultural ecology, and mountain research. His regional focus was on the Central Andes of Ecuador, Peru, and Bolivia; moreover, Gade also investigated cultural landscapes of francophone Canada, Spain and Portugal, highland Madagascar, southern France and northern Italy. He was born in Niagara Falls, New York.

He received the bachelor's degree from Valparaiso University (Indiana) in 1959, a Master of Arts from the University of Illinois at Urbana–Champaign in 1960, and a Master of Science, followed by a Doctorate, from the University of Wisconsin–Madison in 1967. His dissertation on human plant use in the Vilcanota Valley of Peru was published in the series Biogeographica, then edited by German geographer Josef Schmithüsen. During his travels in South America, he also met the Nazi scientist Heinz Brücher and analyzed his work in a publication. He died in Burlington, Vermont on June 15, 2015.

== Selected works ==
Books

- Spell of the Urubamba. Anthropogeographical Essays on an Andean Valley in Space and Time. (Springer Publishing, 2015)
- Curiosity, Inquiry, and the Geographical Imagination (Peter Lang Publishing, 2011)
- Nature and Culture in the Andes (University of Wisconsin Press, 1999)
- Madagascar—Madagasikara (McDonald and Woodward Pub., 1996)
- Plants, Man and the Land in the Vilcanota Valley of Peru (W. Junk Pub., 1975)
