= Department of Geography and the Environment (University of Texas at Austin) =

- Type: Public
- Established: 1949
- Parent institution: University of Texas at Austin
- Location: Austin, Texas, United States
- Website: liberalarts.utexas.edu/geography

The Department of Geography and the Environment is an academic department at the College of Liberal Arts at the University of Texas at Austin. The department was founded in 1949 as the 'Department of Geography' and was renamed the 'Department of Geography and the Environment' in 2004. It was the first Geography Department established in Texas to award doctoral degrees.

== History ==
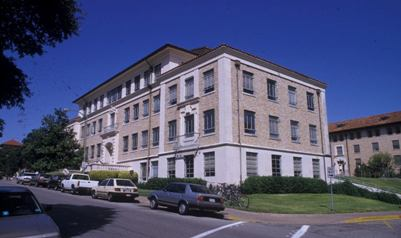
UT Geography Building

From its founding, the department has supported regional and international studies, with special emphases on Texas and the Southwest; Latin America; the Mediterranean World and Middle East; and Northern and Eastern Europe. The department also provided training in the topical areas of geography. These trainings included cultural geography, physical geography (earth sciences), and mathematical geography (cartography). By 1960, conservation (environmental resource management) had become an explicit topical focus that would be further strengthened over the years. By 1970, urban and regional analysis became an area of departmental concern, and by 2004 Urban Studies had been added as a major managed by the department. In more recent years, remote sensing, computer cartography, and geographic information systems have been developed as additional areas of teaching and research. In 2004 the department's name was changed to Geography and the Environment to reflect its enhanced role in the University.

== Notable faculty ==
- Paul C. Adams
- William E. Doolittle
- Robert K. Holz
- Karl Butzer (1934-2016)
- Terry G. Jordan-Bychkov (1938–2003)

== Centers and Labs ==
=== UT Geographic Information Science Center ===
In 2004 the GIScience Center was created to solidify the Department of Geography and The Environment's research and teaching on Geographic Information Science. The GIScience center offers an integrated approach to GISc research and teaching. The GIScience Center is the focal point of Geographic Technologies on UT campus. It works with research units across departments at UT to develop GIS and Remote Sensing resources and research.

==== Environmental Information Science Laboratory ====
This is open to students and researchers, providing equipment and software to develop Geographic Projects. It was established in 1985.

==== Digital Landscapes Laboratory ====
Strictly a research laboratory, the Digital Landscapes Laboratory houses researchers performing technology demanding geographic research.

=== Physical Geography Center ===
Physical Geography laboratories provide all equipment and lab space needed for the department.

=== Weather and Climate Resource Center ===
The department's Weather and Climate Resource Center maintains a digital database of Austin and Texas weather and storm and climate data. This includes all records for the two National Weather Service first order weather observation stations for the greater Austin metropolitan area. The station at KAUS/Austin Bergstrom International Airport includes records since 1942 and KATT/Austin City-Camp Mabry records date back to 1856. The Center also provides weather monitoring services during special occasions or emergencies for the University of Texas.

== Notable alumni ==
- Andrew Sluyter
