= Preston E. James =

American geographer (1899–1986)

- Born: Preston Everett James; February 14, 1899; Brookline, Massachusetts
- Died: January 5, 1986 (aged 86)
- Awards: David Livingstone Centenary Medal (1966); Patron's Medal (1980)

Academic background
- Education: Harvard University (B.A., M.A.); Clark University (Ph.D.)

Preston Everett James was an American geographer. He was president of the American Association of Geographers from 1951 to 1952, and gave the annual presidential address at their 1966 banquet.

James' work had a distinct focus on the geography of Latin America, and as such, the Conference of Latin Americanist Geographers' Preston E. James Eminent Latin Americanist Career Award is named for him.

== Career ==
James joined Harvard University in 1916, though left in 1918 for topographic study at a ROTC camp. He decided to join the military and fought in World War I, then returned to Harvard to complete a B.A. and an M.A. before transferring to Clark University, where he received a Ph.D. in 1923. Following this, he joined the University of Michigan faculty. He shifted his priorities to his military service in 1941, after the onset of World War II.

In 1943, James was raised to the rank of Lieutenant colonel, and he served as the head of a geographic division during World War II. Following the war, in 1945, James accepted an offer from George Cressey to join the faculty of Syracuse University, where he earned the title Maxwell Professor of Geography in 1964, and became emeritus in 1970. He served as chair of the Geography Department from 1950 to 1958, succeeding Cressey in the position. During the summer of 1962, he toured Europe by car. Though the specific date ranges are unknown, he also served as adjunct professor of geography at Florida Atlantic University during the 1970s. He was admitted to the Florida Society of Geographers in 1973.

James visited the campus of Rollins College in 1965 to speak at a Latin-American forum. He had also spoken multiple times at the University of Kentucky's Geography in the Bluegrass Day.

In May 1967, James received an honorary Doctor of Science from Eastern Michigan University.
