= Evelyn Pruitt =

Geographer (1918–2000)

- Born: Evelyn Lord Pruitt; April 25, 1918; San Francisco, California, U.S.
- Died: January 19, 2000 (aged 81); Arlington, Virginia, U.S.
- Education: University of California, Los Angeles (BA, MA)
- Occupation: Geographer

Evelyn Lord Pruitt (April 25, 1918 – January 19, 2000) was an American geographer. She was editor of The Professional Geographer, and is known for developing the field of remote sensing and coining the term "remote sensing".

== Early life and education ==
Pruitt was born in San Francisco on April 25, 1918; her parents were Ethel Lord and Conrad Douglas Pruitt. She first became interested in geography while serving as the driver for a field trip with her older sister. She has a B.A. (1940) and an M.A. (1943) from the University of California, Los Angeles. She started work for the United States Coast and Geodetic Survey in 1942, and was the first woman to attain the rank of 'professional' in the organization.

== Career ==
Pruitt moved to working at the Office of Naval Research in 1948 where she first worked to establish research at Point Barrow, Alaska. She later became director of geographic programs at the Office of Naval Research where she worked on coastal erosion and helped advance the use of satellites to study the planet. Through this work Pruitt established a mechanism for distributing funds for research in the field. Pruitt started editing The Professional Geographer in 1957, a position she would hold for three years.

Pruitt retired from the Office of Naval Research in 1973, by which time she was the highest ranking woman scientist in the United States Navy. She remained active after retirement, and in 1975, Pruitt served as chair of the Coastal Society's first conference, and in 1977 she served as the second president of the Coastal Society.

In the early 1960s, Pruitt realized that advances in science meant that aerial photography was no longer an adequate term to describe the new data streams being used to study the planet. With assistance from her fellow staff member at the Office of Naval Research, Walter Bailey, she coined the term "remote sensing" in an unpublished white paper. Pruitt then started work on what would become the first symposium on remote sensing in the environment to be held first at the University of Michigan, and at these meetings the use of the term remote sensing began to be more widely used. She later heralded remote sensing for its "fantastic potential for looking at the world".

She died of pneumonia on January 19, 2000.

== Selected publications ==
- Pruitt, Evelyn L.; Bowden, Leonard W. (1974). Manual of remote sensing. 2, Interpretation and applications. Falls Church, VA: American Society of photogrammetry. OCLC 948263827 – via worldcat.org.
- Pruitt, Evelyn L. (1979). "The Office of Naval Research and Geography". Annals of the Association of American Geographers. 69 (1): 103–108. doi:10.1111/j.1467-8306.1979.tb01235.x. ISSN 0004-5608. JSTOR 2569553.
- Russell, Richard Joel; Kniffen, Fred Bowerman; Pruitt, Evelyn Lord. Culture worlds. National Library.

== Honors and awards ==
Pruitt received a Superior Civilian Service Award from the United States Navy in 1973. In 1981, the American Association of Geographers awarded Pruitt with a citation for Meritorious Contributions to the Field of Geography, and the Society of Women Geographers presented Pruitt with their outstanding achievement award. She received an honorary doctorate from Louisiana State University in 1983, the first woman and first geographer to receive this honor. In 1984 the American Association of Geographers awarded her with their highest honor, the James R. Anderson Medal of Honor in Applied Geography. She was also a Regents Professor at the University of California at Los Angeles. In 2003, Louisiana State University established a lecture series named in her honor. The Society of Women Geographers has established a scholarship in Pruitt's honor.
