= Karl Butzer =

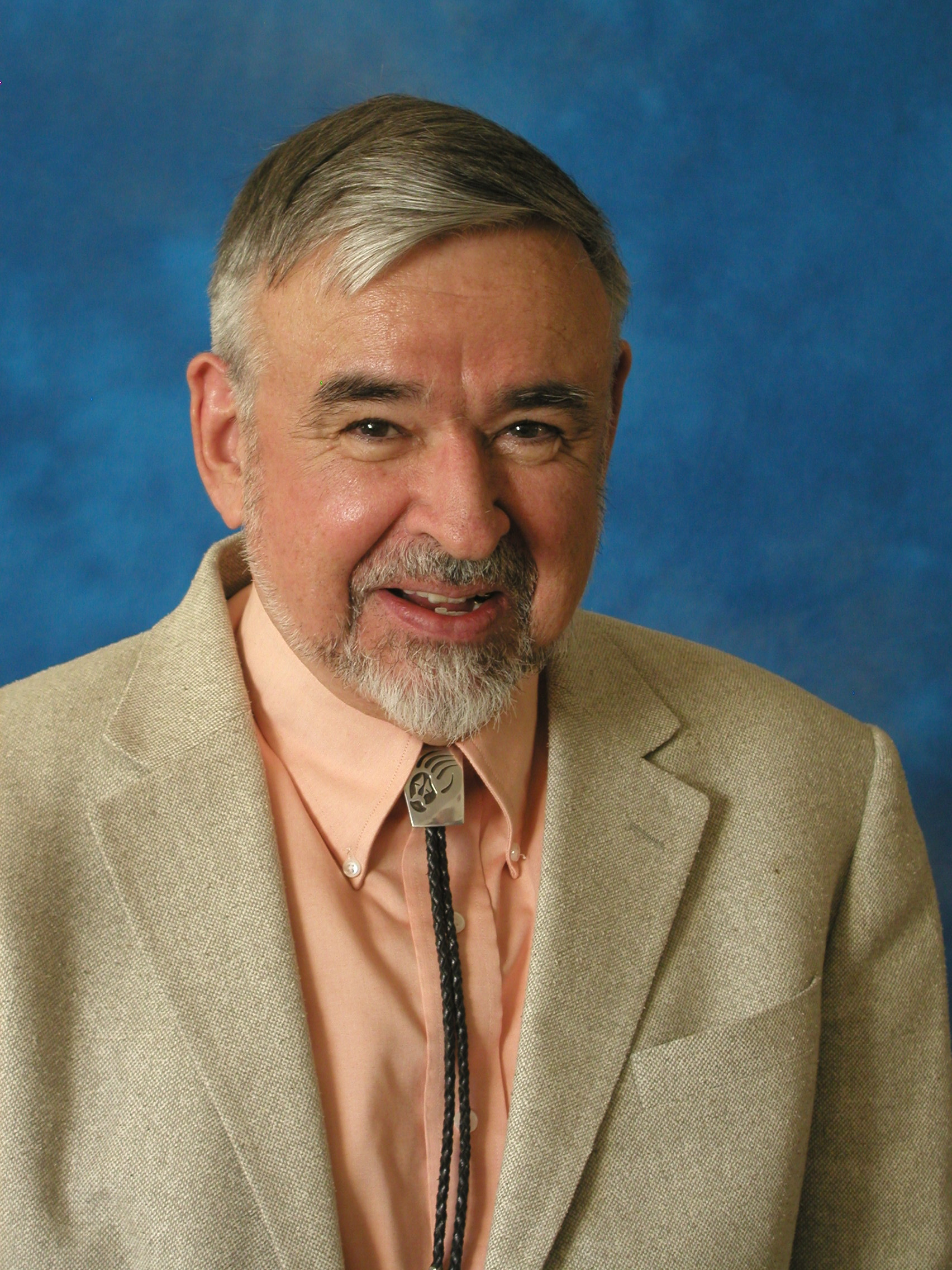
- Born: August 19, 1934; Mülheim, Germany
- Died: May 4, 2016 (aged 81); Austin, Texas, U.S.
- Education: McGill University (B.Sc., M.Sc.); University of Bonn (Ph.D.)
- Occupations: Geographer, Cultural Ecologist and Environmental Archaeologist
- Scientific career
- Fields: Geography, cultural ecology, environmental archaeology
- Workplaces: University of Wisconsin–Madison; ETH Zurich; University of Chicago; University of Texas at Austin

Karl W. Butzer (August 19, 1934 – May 4, 2016) was a German-born American geographer, ecologist, and archaeologist. He received two degrees at McGill University, Montreal: the B.Sc. (hons) in Mathematics in 1954 and later his master's degree in Meteorology and Geography. Afterwards in the 1950s he returned to Germany to the University of Bonn to obtain a doctorate in physical geography. He obtained a master's degree in Meteorology and Geography from McGill University and a doctorate in physical geography from the University of Bonn in Germany.

From 1959 through 1966 he taught at the University of Wisconsin–Madison. This was followed by a stint at ETH Zurich, Switzerland. Next, he taught at the University of Chicago until 1984. After that, he went to the Department of Geography and the Environment at University of Texas at Austin.

== Life ==
Butzer was born in 1934 in Mülheim to a Catholic family. In 1937 as a young child his family fled Germany for England and later during World War II, they moved to Canada. While he was still a child, his family emigrated, first to England, and then to Canada. His brother is the mathematician Paul Butzer.

Karl Butzer died on May 4, 2016, in Austin, Texas, at the age of 81.

== Major Areas of International Fieldwork ==
- Egypt and Nubia, including dissertation fieldwork (1956); archaeological survey for the German Archaeological Institute (1958); Quaternary studies and geoarchaeology for Yale University (1962–63); and geoarchaeology of the 'Lost City of the Pyramids' (Ancient Egypt Research Associates) (2001–02).
- East Africa, with the University of Chicago Omo Expedition in SW Ethiopia (1967–69); and independently at Axum, Ethiopia (1971, 1973).
- South Africa, including nine field seasons between 1969 and 1983, focused on Quaternary studies and the geoarchaeology of some thirty sites, including Taung and Swartkrans.
- Spain, including independent research in Mallorca and Catalunya (1969–71); the University of Chicago Excavations at Torralba-Ambrona (1961–63, 1967, 1980–81); and directing the Sierra de Espadan Project in anthropology, historical archaeology, and environmental history (1980–87). In 2001, Karl and Elisabeth organized and led a series of field trips in eastern Spain for the Conference of Latin American Geographers.
- Mexico, where Butzer carried out annual field trips 1985-91, and directed the Laguna Project 1995-2000, devoted to the Spanish Colonial imprint and to the environmental history of northern Mexico. Karl and Elisabeth Butzer organized and led urban and rural field trips in Central Mexico (1989) and Northern Mexico (2000) for the Conference of Latin Americanist Geographers.
- Australia, fieldwork in collaboration with David Helgren, evaluating the impact of livestock introduction to New South Wales (1999, 2003).
- Cyprus, studying environmental history and geoarchaeology (2004).
- Other fieldwork includes French coastal reclamation in Nova Scotia (1999), and geoarchaeology of Celtic hillforts in northern Portugal (2010–11).

== Courses Developed and Students ==
At the University of Wisconsin (1960–66), Butzer regularly offered a course on Pleistocene environments, including what is now called geoarchaeology, in addition to introductory physical geography, and graduate seminars in climatology and coastal geomorphology. At the University of Chicago (1966–84), he taught advanced courses in physical geography, applied geomorphology, and environmental archaeology, as well as graduate seminars in settlement archaeology and geography. At the ETH-Zurich (1981–82), he introduced a new program in human geography, which continued to be implemented after his departure. At the University of Texas (since 1984), he offered graduate courses in geoarchaeology and environmental history; cultural ecology; historical geography; and landscape, society, and meaning. In 2005 he received an Outstanding Graduate Teaching Award of the University of Texas. He has had 30 Ph.D.'s and 16 M.A.'s, at Wisconsin, Chicago, and Texas.

== Honors ==
- 2009: Melvin G. Marcus Distinguished Career Award
- 1979 Busk Medal from the Royal Geographical Society
- Fryxell Medal of the Society of American Archaeology
- 1986: Archaeological Geology Award
- 1991 Pomerance Award for Scientific Contributions to Archaeology
- 2002: Preston E. James Eminent Latin Americanist Career Award
- 1996: member, National Academy of Sciences
- Member, American Academy of Arts and Sciences

== Selected publications ==
- 1964 Environment and Archaeology: An Ecological Approach to Prehistory.
- 1976 Early Hydraulic Civilization in Egypt: A Study in Cultural Ecology.
- 1978 Dimensions of Human Geography: Essays on Some Familiar and Neglected Themes.
- 1982 Archaeology as Human Ecology: Method and Theory for a Contextual Approach.
- 1988 "Cattle and Sheep from Old to New Spain: Historical Antecedents," Annals of the Association of American Geographers 78: 29-56.
- 1993 "The Classical Tradition of Agronomic Science: Perspectives on Carolingian Agriculture and Agronomy," In: P.L. Butzer and D. Lohrmann (eds.), Science in Western and eastern Civilization in Carolingian Times, pp. 539–596.
