= William Denevan =

American geographer

William Maxfield Denevan (born October 16, 1931, in San Diego) is an American geographer. He is professor emeritus of Geography at the University of Wisconsin-Madison and is a prominent member of the Berkeley School of cultural-historical geography. He also worked in the Latin American Center and the Institute for Environmental Studies at Wisconsin. His research interests are in the historical ecology of the Americas, especially Amazonia and the Andes.

== Education ==
He earned B.A., M.A., and Ph.D. degrees in geography at the University of California at Berkeley. His dissertation (1963) was on "The Aboriginal Settlement of the Llanos de Mojos: A Seasonally Inundated Savanna in Northeastern Bolivia," which he revised into a monograph in 1966.

== Career ==
In 1963 he became assistant professor of geography at Wisconsin, where he remained throughout his career, serving as Chair of the Geography Department from 1980 to 1983 and Director of the Latin American Center from 1978 to 1980, becoming the Carl O. Sauer Professor of Geography in 1987, and retiring as Professor Emeritus in 1993.

His 1961 monograph on fire and pines in Nicaragua was one of the first studies to show the relation of pine forest distribution to human burning. In an article in 1973 he was an early reporter of massive deforestation in Amazonia. The book, The Native Population of the Americas in 1492 (1976, 1992), which he edited, provided an influential estimate of the pre-Columbian population of the Americas, which he placed at between 43 and 65 million. Much of his research is concerned with how pre-1492 native peoples in the Americas modified their landscapes. This is in contrast to what he calls "The Pristine Myth" (1992), the controversial belief that most of those people had minimal or no impact on the environment. He helped discover prehistoric raised fields, causeways, canals, and other earthworks in Amazonia, reported in Scientific American (1967) and Science (1970). His book, Cultivated Landscapes of Native Amazonia and the Andes, was published by Oxford in 2001. He contributed to a reconsideration of the achievements of native Amazonians. An anthology of his most important papers, Forest, Field, and Fallow, was published in 2021.

== Awards and honors ==
Fellow, Guggenheim Foundation, 1977; Honors, Association of American Geographers, 1987; Honorary Degree, Universidad del Beni (Bolivia), 1993; Fellow, American Academy of Arts and Sciences, 2001; Arch C. Gerlach Prize, Pan American Institute of Geography and History, 2001–2005; Lifetime Achievement Award, Earth Archive Congress, 2021; David Livingstone Centenary Medal, American Geographical Society, 2021.

== Books and Monographs ==
- The Upland Pine Forests of Nicaragua: A Study in Cultural Plant Geography (Berkeley, 1961).
- The Aboriginal Cultural Geography of the Llanos de Mojos of Bolivia (Berkeley, 1966).
- The Biogeography of a Savanna Landscape: The Gran Pajonal of Eastern Peru (co-author, Montreal, 1970).
- La Montaña Central Peruana (co-editor, Lima, 1972).
- The Native Population of the Americas in 1492 (editor, Madison, 1976, 2nd edition, 1992).
- Adaptive Strategies in Karinya Subsistence, Venezuelan Llanos (co-author, Caracas, 1978).
- Campos Elevados e Historia Cultural Prehispánica en los Llanos Occidentales de Venezuela (co-author, Caracas, 1979).
- Pre-Hispanic Agricultural Fields in the Andean Region, 2 vols. (co-editor, Oxford, 1987).
- The Cultural Ecology, Archaeology, and History of Terracing and Terrace Abandonment in the Colca Valley of Southern Peru, 2 vols. Technical Report, National Science Foundation (editor, Washington D.C., 1986, 1988).
- Swidden-Fallow Agroforestry in the Peruvian Amazon (co-editor, New York Botanical Garden, 1988).
- Hispanic Lands and Peoples: Selected Writings of James J. Parsons (editor, Boulder, 1989).
- Cultivated Landscapes of Native Amazonia and the Andes (Oxford, 2001).
- Carl Sauer on Culture and Landscape: Readings and Commentaries (co-editor, Baton Rouge, 2009).
- To Pass on a Good Earth: The Life and Work of Carl O. Sauer, by Michael Williams with David Lowenthal and William M. Denevan (Charlottesville, 2014).
- Forest, Field, and Fallow: Selections by William M. Denevan, edited by Antoinette WinklerPrins and Kent Mathewson (Springer, Switzerland, 2021).

== Notable Articles and Chapters ==
- "Comments on the Earthworks of Mojos in Northeastern Bolivia," American Antiquity (1963).
- "Livestock Numbers in 19th Century New Mexico and the Problem of Gullying in the Southwest," Annals of the Association of American Geographers (1967).
- "Pre-Columbian Ridged Fields," Scientific American (co-author, 1967).
- "Ancient Ridged Fields in the Region of Lake Titicaca," Geographical Journal (co-author, 1968).
- "Aboriginal Drained-Field Cultivation in the Americas," Science (1970).
- "Campa Subsistence in the Gran Pajonal, Eastern Peru," Geographical Review (1971).
- "Forms, Functions, and Associations of Raised Fields in the Old World Tropics," Journal of Tropical Geography (co-author, 1973).
- "Development and the Imminent Demise of the Amazon Rainforest," Professional Geographer (1973).
- "Swiddens and Cattle Versus Forest," in Studies in Third World Societies (1981).
- "Hydraulic Agriculture in the American Tropics: Forms, Measures, and Recent Research," in Maya Subsistence (1982).
- "Adaptation, Variation, and Cultural Geography," Professional Geographer (1983).
- "Terrace Abandonment in the Colca Valley, Peru," in British Archaeological Reports (1987).
- "The Geography of Fragile Lands in Latin America," in Fragile Lands (1989).
- "Prehistoric Roads and Causeways of Lowland Tropical America," in Ancient Road Networks (1991).
- "Stone vs Metal Axes: The Ambiguity of Shifting Cultivation in Prehistoric Amazonia," Journal of the Steward Anthropological Society" (1992).
- "The Pristine Myth: The Landscape of the Americas in 1492," Annals of the Association of American Geographers" (1992).
- "The Shippee-Johnson Aerial Photography Expedition to Peru," Geographical Review (1993).
- "Prehistoric Agricultural Methods as Models for Sustainability," Advances in Botanical Research (1995).
- "A Bluff Model of Riverine Settlement in Prehistoric Amazonia," Annals of the Association of American Geographers (1996).
- "Carl Sauer and Native American Population Size," Geographical Review (1996).
- "The Native Population of Amazonia in 1492 Reconsidered," Revista de Indias (2003).
- "Historical Perspectives on Amazonian Dark Earths," in Amazonian Dark Earths (co-author, 2003).
- "Pre-European Forest Cultivation in Amazonia," in Time and Complexity in Historical Ecology (2006).
- "The Columbian Encounter and the Little Ice Age: Abrupt Land Use Change, Fire, and Greenhouse Forcing," Annals of the Association of American Geographers (co-author, 2010).
- "The Pristine Myth Revisited," Geographical Review (2011).
- "Population Estimates for Anthropologically Enriched Soils (Amazonian Dark Earths)," in Soils, Climate, and Society (co-author, 2013).
- "The Domestication of Amazonia Before European Conquest," Proceedings of the Royal Society: Biological Sciences (co-author, 2015).
- "After 1492: Nature Rebounds," Geographical Review (2016).
- "Evidence Confirms an Anthropic Origin of Amazonian Dark Earths," Nature Communications (many co-authors, 2022).
