= Wall of Tears (Galápagos Islands) =

Historical site in the Galapagos Islands, Ecuador

Coordinates: 0.964925°S 91.013578°W

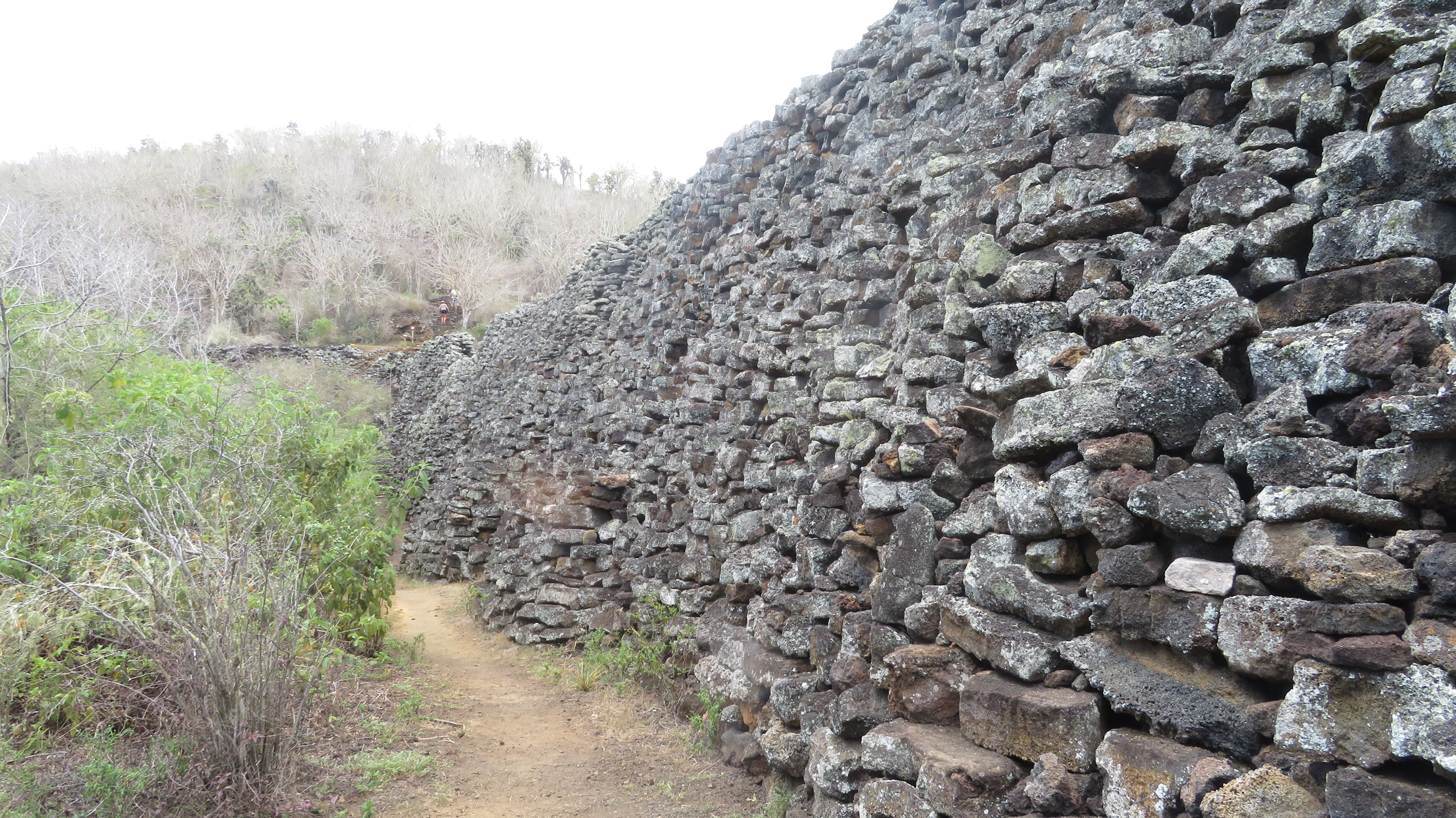
The Wall of Tears

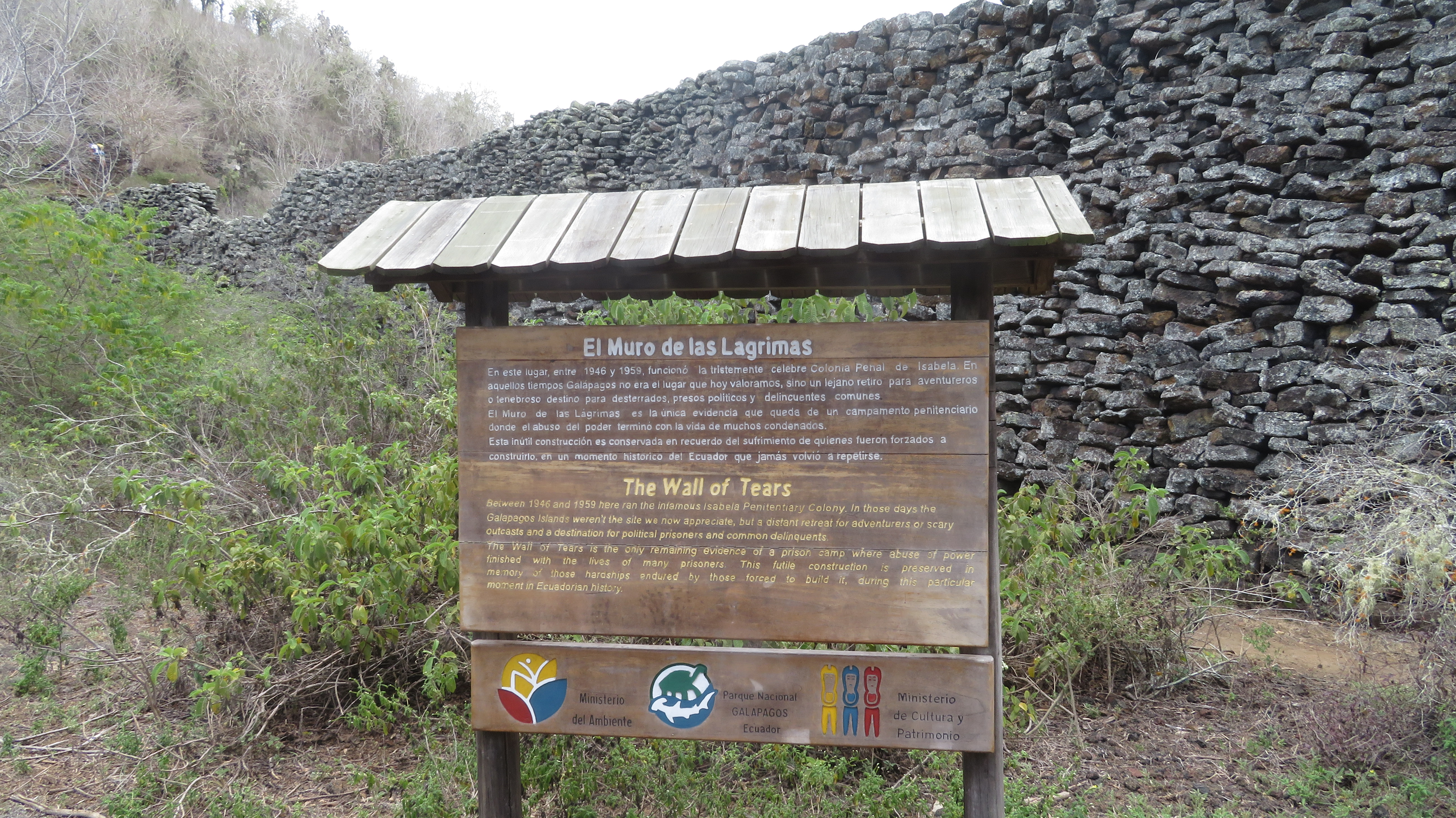
Information board, which describes the Wall as an “inútil construcción” (useless construction)

The Wall of Tears (Spanish: El Muro de las Lágrimas) is a historical site 5 km west of Puerto Villamil on Isabela Island in the Galapagos Islands, Ecuador. It is one of the few remaining vestiges of the penal colony that existed on Isabela Island between 1946 and 1959. Since then, it has become a local landmark and sightseeing destination for tourists.

== History ==
In 1893, prior to the establishment of the modern penal colony, the entrepreneur Antonio Gil founded the settlement of Puerto Villamil, named for José de Villamil, where prisoners were often employed mining coral and burning it to produce lime.

After World War II, during which time parts of the Galápagos Islands served as an American military base, President José María Velasco Ibarra ordered the founding of what was to be the largest penal colony in the archipelago. Among their labors, prisoners in the penal colony were forced to carry large chunks of basalt to build the wall, "to subdue the criminal instincts of the prisoners as well as their depraved passions." The colony was active from 1946 until a revolt by prisoners followed by a mass escape attempt involving the hijacking of an American yacht led to the colony's closure in 1959.

Despite popular legends, the penal colony was home to prisoners convicted of relatively minor crimes; the total population of Isabela and Floreana Islands in the year 1950 was approximately 250, of which about 100 were convicts. The penal colony was razed and abandoned after its closure; as of 1997, the only visible ruins were a heavily rusted iron cylinder and the Wall of Tears itself.

== Features ==
In its dimensions, the wall measures approximately 50 meters long, 5 meters wide, and 8 meters tall. (Note: As the wall's dimensions are not exact, different sources give varying figures for its size. For example, the wall has been described as measuring 100 meters long and 7 meters high; 20 feet wide, 50 feet high, and 100 yards in length; or 23 feet high and 328 feet in length.)

The wall is located approximately 5 kilometers from Puerto Villamil via foot trail. Approximately halfway along the trail is the island's Tortoise Breeding Center. The penal colony was built in the foot of a hill and the trail runs up the hill to afford tourists a scenic view beyond the wall to the Bay of Villamil beyond.

== In popular culture ==
The Wall of Tears is mentioned in Jodi Picoult's 2021 novel Wish You Were Here, as it is visited by the protagonist during a trip to the Galápagos Islands.
