= Journal of Latin American Geography =

- Discipline: Geography
- Language: English
- Edited by: John Finn

Publication details
- Publisher: University of Texas Press on behalf of the Conference of Latin Americanist Geographers
- Frequency: Triannual

Standard abbreviations
- ISO 4: J. Lat. Am. Geogr.

Indexing
- ISSN: 1545-2476 (print); 1548-5811 (web)

Links
- Journal homepage

The Journal of Latin American Geography is a triannual peer-reviewed academic journal published by the University of Texas Press on behalf of the Conference of Latin Americanist Geographers. The journal is abstracted and indexed by Scopus.
