= Robert K. Holz =

Robert K. Holz (1930 – 2020) was the Erich W. Zimmermann Regents Professor Emeritus of Geography at the University of Texas at Austin. He had courtesy appointments also in the departments of Middle Eastern Studies and African and African American Studies, and was Director of its Center for Middle Eastern Studies.

== Works ==
He wrote on the subject of remote sensing, Texas geography, and the geography of Egypt.

- Mendes I (coauthored with Emma Swan Hall; Bernard V Bothmer) Cairo : American Research Center in Egypt, 1980
- The surveillant science; remote sensing of the environment, First edition Boston, Houghton Mifflin, 1973; 2nd ed, New York: Wiley, 1985. According to WorldCat, the first ed. is in 453 libraries, the second in 252.
- The Size, Distribution, and Growth of the Texas Population, 1980 to 2030
- The Aswan High Dam
- Third world colonias: Lower Rio Grande valley, Texas Austin Texas: Lyndon Johnson School of Public Affairs, 1993. :
- Texas and its history (coauthored with Mildred P Mayhall; Samuel W Newman; Frank Oliver) Austin, 1972.

He also wrote a novel:

- A prayer for Juan Garza : drug culture in the Lower Rio Grande Valley of Texas published in 2008.
