= William E. Doolittle =

American geographer

William E. Doolittle (born September 3, 1947, in Texas, USA) is an American geographer and the Erich W. Zimmermann Regents Professor Emeritus at the University of Texas at Austin. He served with the US Navy in the Mobile Riverine Force in the Mekong Delta, Vietnam, 1967–1968. Doolittle is prominent among the fourth generation of the Berkeley School of Latin Americanist Geography and specializes in landscapes and ancient agricultural systems in the American Southwest and Mexico.

== Background ==
Doolittle attended Texas Christian University, Fort Worth, Texas and obtained a B.A. in Government and Geography (1974). He then studied at the University of Missouri, Columbia (M.A. 1976) and received his Ph.D. in 1979 from the University of Oklahoma, studying with B.L. Turner II.

He taught for two years at Mississippi State University. He joined the UT Geography Department in 1981, where he served as an undergraduate advisor, graduate advisor (receiving UT's Outstanding Graduate Advisor Award in 2004), and department chair for 11 years. He retired in 2023.

He was a visiting professor at Brown University in 1997, and a Fulbright Senior Specialist at Stockholm University in 2007. Over his career at UT Austin, he directed 19 dissertations, 28 master's theses, and 12 undergraduate honors theses.

== Research interests ==
Doolittle's research interests include landscapes, histories, and ancient agricultural systems in arid lands, particularly the American Southwest, Mexico, and Spain. His research focuses on systems associated with landscape transformations for food production in dry lands. His work on aqueducts is described in an interview. He is currently writing a book about 16th-century aqueducts in Mexico.

== Awards and honors ==
- Carl O. Sauer Distinguished Scholarship Award, Conference of Latin Americanist Geographers, 1994.
- Robert McC. Netting Award for distinguished interdisciplinary research, Cultural and Political Ecology Specialty Group, Association of American Geographers (2003).
- Outstanding Service Award, Conference of Latin Americanist Geographers (CLAG) (2004).
- Fellow, American Association for the Advancement of Science (2005).
- Distinguished Scholarship Honors, Association of American Geographers (2006).
- Honorary doctorate, Stockholm University (2015).
- Fellow, Association of American Geographers (2020).
- Preston E. James Eminent Latin Americanist Career Award, Conference of Latin Americanist Geographers (2014).

== Selected publications ==
=== Books ===
- Pre-Hispanic Occupance in the Valley of Sonora, Mexico: Archaeological Confirmation of Early Spanish Reports. Tucson: Anthropological Papers of the University of Arizona 48 (1988).
- Canal Irrigation in Prehistoric Mexico: The Sequence of Technological Change. Austin: The University of Texas Press (1990).
- Cultivated Landscapes of Native North America. Oxford: Oxford University Press (2000).
- The Safford Valley Grids: Prehistoric Cultivation in the Southern Arizona Desert. Tucson: Anthropological Papers of the University of Arizona 70 (2004).

=== Journal articles and book chapters ===
- Canal Irrigation at Casas Grandes: A Technological and Developmental Assessment of its Origins. In Culture and Contact: Charles C. DiPeso's Gran Chichimeca, Anne I. Woosley John C. Ravesloot, eds. (Albuquerque: University of New Mexico Press, 1993):133-151.
- A Method for Distinguishing Between Prehistoric and Recent Water and Soil Control Features. Co-authored with James A. Neely and Michael D. Pool. Kiva 59:7-25 (1993).
- The San Saba-Menard Irrigation System: Lessons Learned by Unraveling Its Origin. In Soil, Water, Biology, and Belief in Prehistoric and Traditional Southwestern Agriculture. H. Wolcott Toll, ed. Albuquerque: New Mexico Archaeological Council, Special Publication 2, pp. 263–277 (1995).
- Indigenous Development of Mesoamerican Irrigation. Geographical Review 85:301-323 (1995).
- Innovation and Diffusion of Sand- and Gravel-Mulch Agriculture in the American Southwest: A Product of the Eruption of Sunset Crater. Quaternaire 9:61-69 (1998).
- Noria Technology in Mexico: Against the Current and Against the Odds. International Molinology 59:8-13 (1999).
- Learning to See the Impacts of Individuals. Geographical Review 91:423-429 (2001).
- Channel Changes and Living Fencerows in Eastern Sonora, Mexico: Myopia in Traditional Resource Management? Geografiska Annaler 85A:247-261 (2003).
- Permanent vs. Shifting Cultivation in the Eastern Woodlands of North America Prior to European Contact. Agriculture and Human Values 21:181-189 (2004).
- Agricultural Manipulation of Floodplains in the Southern Basin and Range Province. Catena 65:179-199 (2006).
- Environmental Mosaics, Agricultural Diversity, and the Evolutionary Adoption of Maize in the American Southwest. In Histories of Maize: Multidisciplinary Approaches to the Prehistory, Linguistics, Biogeography, Domestication, and Evolution of Maize. John Staller, Robert Tykot, Bruce Benz, eds., pp. 109-121 (Amsterdam: Academic Press, 2006). Co-authored with Jonathan B. Mabry.
- Misreading Between the Lines: Evidence and Interpretation of Ancient Settlements in Eastern Sonora, Mexico. In Ethno- and Historical Geographic Studies in Latin America: Essays Honoring William V. Davidson. Peter H. Herlihy, Kent Mathewson, and Craig S. Revels, eds., pp. 299-308 (Baton Rouge: Geoscience and Man 40, 2008).
- Huépac Revisited: Cultural Remapping of a Sonoran Townscape. Journal of the Southwest 51.2:137-164 (2009). Co-authored with Daniel D. Arreola, Lindsey Sutton, Arriana Fernandez, John Finn, Claire Smith, and Casey Allen.
- Economics and the Process of Making Farmland. In Landesque Capital: The Historical Ecology of Enduring Landscape Modifications. N. Thomas Håkansson and Mats Widgren, eds., pp. 31-48 (Walnut Creek: Left Coast Press, 2014).
- Landscapes, Locales, Fields and Food. In Between Mimbres and Hohokam: Exploring the Archaeology and History of Southeastern Arizona and Southwestern New Mexico. Henry D. Wallace and Patricia L. Crown, eds., pp. 411-426 (Tucson: Desert Archaeology, Inc., 2014).
