= Conference of Latin Americanist Geographers =

The Conference of Latin Americanist Geographers (CLAG) was formed in 1970 to foster geographic education and research on Latin America. A board of directors governs CLAG. CLAG publishes a Newsletter and the Journal of Latin American Geography. It also operates CLAGNET, an electronic Listserv for members.

The Syracuse University Archives preserve documents and photographs related to the history of the organization because the long-standing Executive Director, David J. Robinson, is a professor at that university.

== Awards ==
Each year CLAG makes several awards to distinguished Latin Americanist geographers and others.

- Preston E. James Eminent Latin Americanist Career Award
- Carl O. Sauer Distinguished Scholarship Award
- Outstanding Service to CLAG
- Private Sector and Government Award
- Enlaces Award

CLAG also makes awards to graduate students to support research and conference travel.

== Conferences ==
CLAG organizes a conference on a regular basis. The conference typically takes place in the Americas but in 2001 met in Benicassim, Spain.

- 1970 Muncie
- 1971 Syracuse
- 1973 Calgary
- 1974 Boca Raton
- 1975 Chapel Hill
- 1976 El Paso
- 1977 Paipa
- 1979 Rohnert Park, California
- 1980 Muncie
- 1981 Buffalo
- 1982 Sto. Domingo
- 1984 Ottawa
- 1985 Washington, DC
- 1987 Mérida, Mexico
- 1988 San José, Costa Rica
- 1989 Querétaro, Mexico
- 1990 Auburn
- 1992 Sto. Domingo
- 1994 Ciudad Juárez, Mexico
- 1996 Tegucigalpa, Honduras
- 1997 Arequipa, Peru
- 1998 Santa Fe
- 2000 Austin
- 2001 Benicassim, Spain
- 2003 Tucson
- 2004 Antigua, Guatemala
- 2005 Morelia, Mexico
- 2007 Colorado Springs
- 2009 Granada, Nicaragua
- 2010 Bogotá, Colombia
- 2012 Mérida, Mexico
- 2014 Panamá City, Panamá
- 2015 Fortaleza, Brazil
- 2017 New Orleans
- 2018 San José, Costa Rica
- 2020 Antigua, Guatemala
- 2021 LiveCLAG (virtual)
- 2022 Tucson, Arizona
- 2024 Old San Juan, Puerto Rico
- 2026 Puerto Vallarta, Mexico
