= Billie Lee Turner II =

American geographer

Billie Lee Turner II (born December 22, 1945, Texas City, Texas) is an American geographer and human-environmental scientist, member of the National Academy of Sciences and other honorary institutions. Prominent among the third generation of the Berkeley School of Latin Americanist Geography and cultural ecological research, he has been a leader in bridging this work with the Chicago School of natural hazards and risk research. In August 2008, he took a position as the first Gilbert F. White Chair in Environment and Society at Arizona State University, where he is affiliated with the School of Geographical Sciences and Urban Planning and the School of Sustainability. In November 2015, he was named a Regent’s Professor, the highest faculty honor that can be bestowed by Arizona State University.

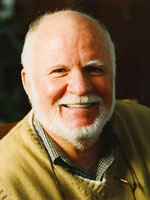
Billie Lee Turner, II

For most of his career (1980–2008) he taught at Clark University in Worcester, Massachusetts. There, he served as Alice C. Higgins and Milton P. Professor of Environment and Society, and Director of the Graduate School of Geography. In 2019, he was appointed Adjunct Faculty of Graduate Studies at Dalhousie University.

== Personal ==
Raised and educated in Texas, he is the first son of Billie Lee Turner, a noted taxonomist and desert botanist. He has a B.A. and M.A. in Geography from the University of Texas at Austin (1968, 1969) and received his PhD at the University of Wisconsin–Madison in 1974 for work on Mayan agriculture and landscape change, under the tutelage of William M. Denevan. He then taught at the University of Maryland, Baltimore County for two years, and was based from 1975–1979 in the Department of Geography, University of Oklahoma before moving to Clark University in 1980 and Arizona State University (ASU) in 2008. While at ASU, Turner was named a Regents Professor and the Gilbert F. White Professor of Environment and Society. He retired from ASU in May 2025.

Turner is married with one daughter. His son, Billie Lee Turner III (Aug. 15, 1970-18 May, 2013) died from myotonic dystrophy (MD), as did his first wife, Linda Lee (Van Zandt) Turner in May 2011.

== Scholarship ==
Turner's contributions to knowledge have evolved from an interest in human impacts on the natural world. His early study was on the borders of archaeology, paleoecology and geography – the pre-Hispanic agricultural systems of the Maya in the Yucatán Peninsula of Mexico (Turner, 1983; Harrison & Turner, 1978). This work fueled an interest in agricultural pathways and livelihoods more generally, particularly patterns of agricultural intensification. As an authority of agricultural systems, Turner produced several influential texts on the theory of agrarian change (Turner and Brush, 1989; Turner, 1974; Turner, Hyden & Kates, 1993) and advanced understanding of induced thesis of agricultural intensification.

His position at Clark University assisted in the merger of his cultural ecological interests with the natural hazards-risk work in human ecology, launching him into various leadership roles for international science addressing land change and culminating in the fields of land system science. A major initiative at Clark University involving Robert Kates, who Turner notes as his “second mentor," generated the Earth Transformed by Human Action (1990), a major stocktaking of anthropogenic impacts on the planet and its ecosystems. Over the last 20 years Turner has led, or participated in, other research on the science and dynamics of global environmental change (e.g. Steffen et al., 2004).

His interest in specific impacts of populations and societies on land use change and alterations in land cover led to a return to fieldwork in Central America in the 1990s, supported by several large research grants and supporting a large number of PhD students. The specific focus was to understand contemporary patterns of land use, informed by social investigations and GIS and remote sensing (Turner et al., 2004; Gutman et al., 2004). This research helped to reinterpret climate and landscape change involving the demise of Classic Maya civilization (Turner & Sabloff, 2012). He also promoted the emerging field of 'Sustainability Science', an emerging focus at Arizona State University (Rindfuss et al., 2004), lately applying it to the landscape in the Phoenix metropolitan area, including the design of urban land systems on microclimates. He has served as the Associate Editor of the Proceedings of the National Academy of Sciences focused on sustainability and human-environmental science since 2009.

== Awards and honors ==
- Member, National Academy of Sciences
- Fellow, American Academy of Arts and Sciences
- Fellow, American Association for the Advancement of Science
- Fellow, American Philosophical Society
- Fellow, Massachusetts Academy of Sciences
- Guggenheim Fellow
- Fellow of Center for Advanced Studies in the Behavioral Sciences, Stanford University
- Fellow, American Association of Geographers
- Presidential Achievement Award, American Association of Geographers
- Centenary Medal, Royal Scottish Geographical Society
- Distinguished Scholarship Award—Conference of Latin Americanists Geographers
- Robert Netting Award (2001), Cultural and Political Ecology Specialty Group, Association of American Geographers
- Outstanding Alumnus Award, University of Texas

== Selected bibliography ==
Books

- Harrison P.D. and B. L. Turner II (eds.) 1978. Pre-Hispanic Maya Agriculture. Albuquerque: University of New Mexico Press.
- Turner, B.L. II. 1983. Beneath the Forest: Prehistoric Terracing in the Rio Bec Region of the Maya Lowlands. Boulder: Westview Press.
- Turner, B.L. II and P.D. Harrison (eds.). 1983. Pulltrouser Swamp: Ancient Maya Habitat, Agriculture, and Settlement in Northern Belize. Austin: University of Texas Press. [Reprinted 2000, University of Utah Press: Salt Lake City]
- Turner, B.L. II and S. B. Brush (eds.) 1987. Comparative Farming Systems. New York: Guilford Press.
- Turner, B.L. II, W.C. Clark, R.W. Kates, J.F. Richards, J.T. Mathews, and W.B. Meyer (eds.) 1990. The Earth as Transformed by Human Action: Global and Regional Changes in the Biosphere over the Past 300 Years. Cambridge: Cambridge University Press). [National Academy of Science Science Classic]
- Turner B.L. II, G. Hyden and R.W. Kates (eds.). 1993. Population Growth and Agricultural Change in Africa. Gainesville: University Press of Florida.
- Turner, B.L. II and W.B. Mayer. 1994. Changes in Land Use and Land Cover: A Global Perspective. Cambridge University Press.
- Turner, B.L. II, A. G. Sal, F. Bernáldez, and F. di Castri (eds.). 1995. Global Land-Use Change: A Perspective from the Columbian Encounter. Madrid: Consejo Superior de Investigaciones Científicas.
- Kasperson J.X., R. E. Kasperson and B. L. Turner II (eds.). 1995. Regions at Risk: Comparisons of Threatened Environments . Tokyo: United Nations University Press.
- Whitmore T.M. and B.L. Turner II. 2001. Cultivated Landscapes of Native Middle America on the Eve of Conquest. Oxford: Oxford University Press.
- Steffen W., A. Sanderson, P. Tyson, J. Jäger. P. Matson, B. Moore III, F. Oldfield, K. Richardson, H-J. Schellnhuber, B. L. Turner II, and R. Wasson. 2004. Global Change and the Earth System: A Planet under Pressure. IGBP Global Change Series. Berlin: Springer-Verlag.
- Turner, B. L. II, J.Geoghegan and D.R. Foster. 2004. Integrated Land-Change Science and Tropical Deforestation in the Southern Yucatán: Final Frontiers. Oxford: Clarendon Press.
- Gutman G., A. Janetos, C. Justice, E. Moran, J. Mustard, R. Rindfuss, D. Skole and B. L. Turner II (eds.). 2004. Land Change Science: Observing, Monitoring, and Understanding Trajectories of Change on the Earth's Surface. New York: Kluwer Academic Publishers.
- Turner, B.L. II. 2022. The Anthropocene: 101 Questions and Answers for Understanding the Human Impact on the Global Environment. Agenda Publishing.

Important articles

- Turner, B. L. II. 1974. Prehistoric Intensive Agriculture in the Mayan Lowlands. Science, 185(4146): 118–124.
- Turner, B. L. II and P.D. Harrison. 1981. Prehistoric Raised-Field Agriculture in the Maya Lowlands. Science, 213(4506): 399–405.
- Turner, B.L. II and T.M. Whitmore. 1992. Landscapes of Cultivation in Mesoamerica on the Eve of the Conquest. Annals of the Association of American Geographers, 82(3): 402–425.
- Turner, B.L. II and A. M. Shajaat Ali. 1996. Induced intensification: Agricultural change in Bangladesh with implications for Malthus and Boserup. Proceedings of the National Academy of Sciences of the U.S.A., 93(25): 14984–14991.
- Lambin E.F., B. L. Turner II, H. Geist, S. Agbola, A. Angelsen, J. W. Bruce, O. Coomes, R. Dirzo, G. Fischer, C. Folke, P. S. George, K. Homewood, J. Imbernon, R. Leemans, X. Li, E. F. Moran, M. Mortimore, P.S. Ramakrishnan, J. F. Richards, H. Skånes, W. Steffen, G. D. Stone, U. Svedin, T. Veldkamp, C. Vogel, and J. Xu. 2001. The Causes of Land-Use and Land-Cover Change—Moving Beyond the Myths. Global Environmental Change: Human and Policy Dimensions 11: 5–13.
- Rindfuss R. R., Stephen J. Walsh, B. L. Turner II, Jefferson Fox, and Vinod Mishra. 2004. Developing a Science of Land Change: Challenges and Methodological Issues. Proceedings, National Academy of Sciences of the United States of America, 101(39) 13976–13981.
- Reynolds J.F., D.M. Stafford Smith, E. F. Lambin, B. L. Turner, II, M. Mortimore, S. P. Batterbury, T. E. Downing, H. Dowlatabadi, R. J. Fernandez, J. E. Herrick, E. Huber-Sannvald, R. Leemans, T. Lynam, F. Mestre, M. Ayarza, and B Walker. 2007. Global Desertification: Building a Science for Dryland Development. Science 316: 847–851.
- Turner, B. L. II and Jeremy Sabloff. 2012. Classic Period collapse of the Central Maya Lowlands: Insights about human–environment relationships for sustainability. Proceedings of the National Academy of Sciences 109(35), pp. 13908–13914.
- Zhang, Y., Murray, A., and Turner, B. L., II. 2017. Optimizing green space locations to maximize daytime and nighttime cooling in Phoenix, Arizona. Landscape and Urban Planning vol. 165, pp. 162–171
- Tellman, E., Magliocca, N., Turner, B. L., II, and Verburg, P. Understanding the role of illicit transactions in land-change dynamics. Nature Sustainability, Vol. 3, pp. 175–181.
