= University of Texas Press =

Publisher

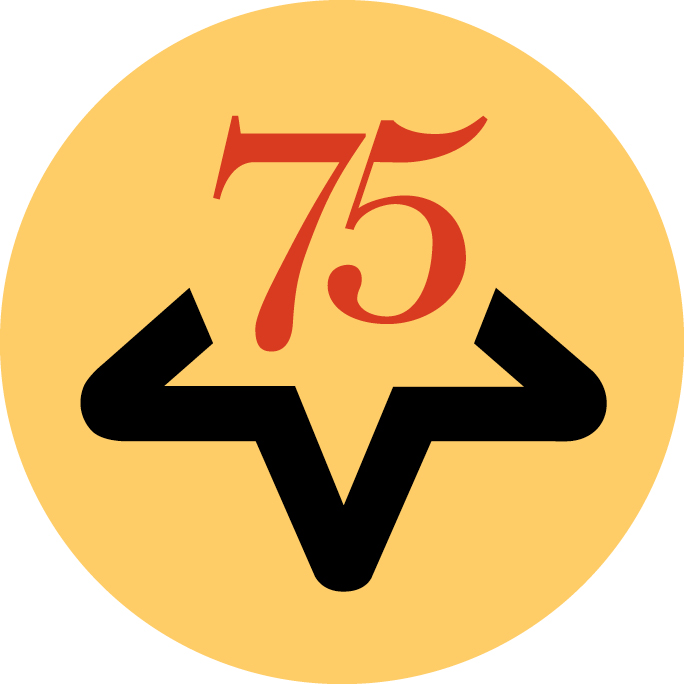
- The logo for the UT Press 75th anniversary
- Parent company: University of Texas at Austin
- Founded: 1950
- Country of origin: United States
- Headquarters location: Austin, Texas
- Distribution: Chicago Distribution Center (US); University of British Columbia (Canada); Combined Academic Publishers (Europe, Asia, the Pacific)
- Publication types: Books, academic journals
- Official website: utpress.utexas.edu

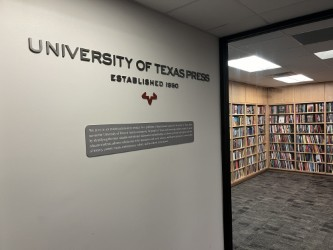
UT Press Office

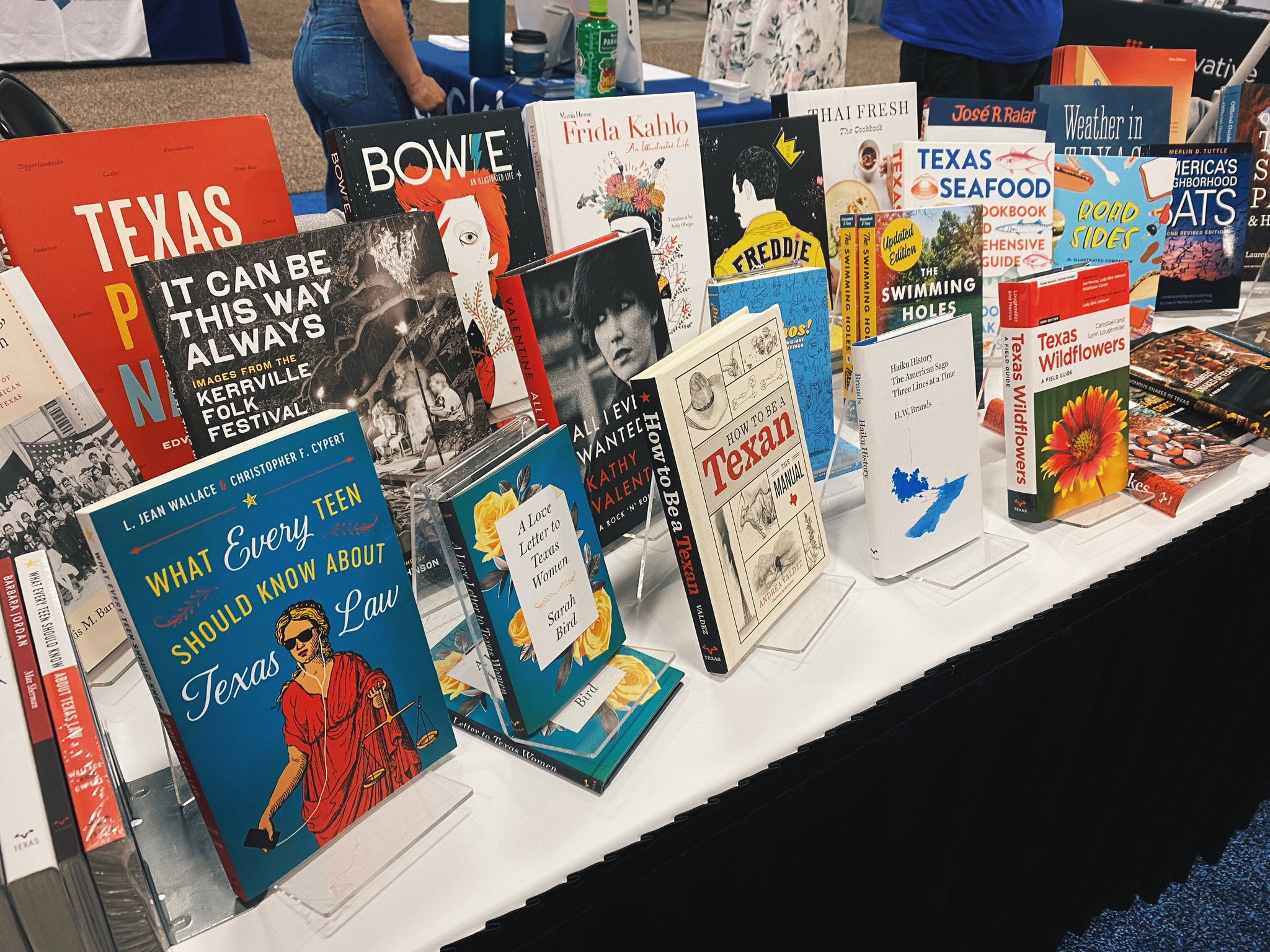
A display of books published by the University of Texas Press.

The University of Texas Press (or UT Press) is the university press of the University of Texas at Austin. Established in 1950, the Press publishes scholarly and trade books in several areas, including Latin American studies, Caribbean studies, U.S. Latinx studies, Texana, Native American studies, Black studies, Middle Eastern studies, Jewish studies, gender studies, film & media studies, music, art, architecture, archaeology, classics, anthropology, food studies and natural history. The Press also publishes journals relating to their major subject areas. The Press produces approximately one hundred new books and thirteen journals each year.

In 2025, the University of Texas Press celebrated its seventy-fifth anniversary. During its time in operation, the Press has published more than 4,000 titles. It is a member of the Association of University Presses.

== History ==
The University of Texas Press was formally founded in 1950, though the University of Texas had been using the name as an imprint since 1922 in order to distribute and print faculty books. Frank H. Wardlaw was the Press's first director, serving in the position from 1950 to 1974. The Press established a scholarly journals division in 1976. In 1986, John H. Kyle started an endowed fellowship program to help the university's graduates start careers in publishing. Responding to the advent of new digital technologies in the 1990s, the Press released multiple CD-ROMs, including Thrinaxodon: Digital Atlas of the Skull (1993) and Wiyuta: Assiniboine Storytelling with Signs (1995).

From its beginning, the Press developed a strong catalogue of books on Latin American studies and published a number of significant works of literature in translation by authors like Juan Rulfo, Octavio Paz, Jorge Luis Borges, and Pablo Neruda. The Press's first book was a translation of The Florida of the Inca, written by Gracilaso de la Vega and translated by John and Jeannette Varner. The book remains in print as of 2025.

== Awards ==
The University of Texas Press has had two books on The New York Times Best Seller list: T.H. White's The Book of Merlyn (1977) and Hanif Abdurraqib's Go Ahead in the Rain: Notes to A Tribe Called Quest (2019), which was part of the American Music Series and which was on the long list for the 2019 National Book Award.

The Press has published winners of the Pulitzer Prize, Nobel Prize, MacArthur "Genius" Grants, the James Beard Award, and more. They have also had books as finalists for the National Book Award, NBCC (Criticism category), Kirkus Prize, and other awards. Their books have won top honors in their fields of focus, including music, Latin American studies, Latinx studies, Indigenous studies, popular culture, architecture, and archaeology.

== Journals ==
- Asian Music
- Diálogo
- Information & Culture
- Journal of the History of Sexuality
- Journal of Individual Psychology
- Journal of Latin American Geography
- Latin American Music Review
- Studies in Latin American Popular Culture
- Texas Studies in Literature and Language
- The Textile Museum Journal
- US Latina & Latino Oral History Journal
- The Velvet Light Trap

=== Formerly published journals ===
- Archaeoastronomy
- Art Lies
- Genders
- Journal of Cinema and Media Studies (formerly known as Cinema Journal)
- The Joyce Studies Annual
- The Latin American Research Review
- Social Science Quarterly
- Southwestern Historical Quarterly

== Series ==
- 21st Century Film Essentials
- American Music Series
- Border Hispanisms
- Chicana Matters
- Cities and Communities of the Etruscans
- CMES Emerging Voices from the Middle East
- CMES Modern Middle East Literatures in Translation
- CMES Shirá Series in Contemporary Hebrew Poetry in Translation
- Connected Histories of the Middle East and the Global South
- Discovering America
- Exploring Jewish Arts and Culture
- Focus on American History Series
- Fordyce W. Mitchel Memorial Lecture Series
- Historia USA
- Inter-America Series
- The Katrina Bookshelf
- Lateral Exchanges
- Latin American Literature in Translation
- Latinx: The Future is Now
- Music Matters
- The Oratory of Classical Greece
- Recovering Languages and Literacies of the Americas
- Southwestern and Mexican Photography Series, The Wittliff Collections at Texas State University
- Southwestern Writers Collection Series, Wittliff Collections at Texas State University
- Terry and Jan Todd Series on Physical Culture and Sports
- The Texas Bookshelf
- Texas Film and Media Studies Series
- Texas Legal Studies Series
- Texas Natural History Guides
- Tower Books Imprint
- The University of Texas Health Press
- World Comics and Graphic Nonfiction Series
- Visualidades

== Controversies ==
University of Texas Press joined The Association of American Publishers trade organization in the Hachette v. Internet Archive lawsuit which resulted in the removal of access to over 500,000 books from global readers.

== See also ==
- List of English-language book publishing companies
- List of university presses
