= List of Spidey and His Amazing Friends episodes =

Spidey and His Amazing Friends is an animated television series produced by Marvel Studios Animation (formerly Marvel Animation) and animated by Atomic Cartoons that premiered on Disney Jr. on August 6, 2021.

== Series overview ==
Season	Segments	Episodes	Originally released	
Season	Segments	Episodes	First released	Last released
1	50	25	August 6, 2021	July 8, 2022
2	58	29	August 19, 2022	November 10, 2023
3	60	30	January 8, 2024	April 11, 2025
4	38	19	June 16, 2025	May 1, 2026
5	TBA	TBA	July 13, 2026	TBA

== Episodes ==
=== Season 1 (2021–22) ===
Episodes were directed by Darren Bachynski and storyboarded by Stephanie Blakey.

No. overall	No. in season	Title	Written by	Original release date	Prod. code	U.S. viewers (millions)
1	1	"Spidey to the Power of Three"	Ashley Mendoza	August 6, 2021	101	0.36
1	1	"Panther Patience"	Sib Ventress	August 6, 2021	101	0.36
"Spidey to the Power of Three": While Peter, Gwen, and Miles wait for Aunt May to return with their favorite flavors of ice cream, they head out to stop Rhino from stealing gold coins from banks. Miles and Gwen disagree over whether to stop him with invisibility or gliding and get in each other's way until Peter reminds them that they are "Team Spidey" and must work together. Using their individual talents, they trick Rhino into dropping his loot and web him up before returning the coins. Upon returning home, they combine their favorite flavors for a tasty mix. "Panther Patience": Peter and Aunt May go to the museum to see Black Panther and the Vibranium and the folk-art exhibit, respectively. As Peter watches Black Panther display the Vibranium, Doc Ock steals it to power up her tentacles and Peter and Black Panther pursue her, with Black Panther teaching him the value of patience. Using a squeaky toy version of the Vibranium that Peter got for his cat, they trick and capture Doc Ock while Aunt May is oblivious to what happened.
2	2	"Superhero Hiccups"	Ken Kristensen	August 6, 2021	102	0.36
2	2	"Lost and Found"	Henry Gifford	August 6, 2021	102	0.36
"Superhero Hiccups": At the library, Peter and Miles witness Green Goblin looking through an old book on how to acquire the Power Sword, but he escapes as Miles develops hiccups. Unsure of what to do, they and Gwen head to the museum and discover the Sword, but Green Goblin covers them in goo and takes it. Miles, inspired by the idea of finding a way around a problem, poses as a ghost and tricks Green Goblin into dropping the Sword, which he uses to trap him and free Peter and Gwen, with him now having hiccups. "Lost and Found": At the movie theater, Peter is perfecting his web bomb when he encounters Rhino and his backpack is lifted onto a garbage truck. He tries to retrieve it and TRACE-E to stop Rhino, who is rampaging through the city and has stolen the backpack. After calling Aunt May, Peter learns to take things one step at a time and tricks Rhino into opening the backpack, allowing TRACE-E to activate the web bomb and trap him. Afterwards, Peter retrieves his backpack and meets up with Aunt May at the movie theater.
3	3	"Doc Ock's Super Octopus"	Kent Redeker	August 13, 2021	103	0.39
3	3	"Attack of the Green Giggles"	Henry Gifford	August 13, 2021	103	0.39
"Doc Ock's Super Octopus": After Doc Ock takes a baby octopus from its family and uses a growth potion to make it grow to massive size, Team Spidey must save it, eventually restoring it to normal with a potion that Peter created. "Attack of the Green Giggles": As Peter is trying out his new camera, he sees people laughing and learns that Green Goblin is using green giggle gas to make people laugh, teaming up with Ms. Marvel to stop him.
4	4	"Bug in the System"	Mark Drop	August 20, 2021	106	0.28
4	4	"Test Your Super Strength"	Josh Haber	August 20, 2021	106	0.28
"Bug in the System": After being alerted by the Spidey Alert, Team Spidey must stop Doc Ock from using the Octo Vacuum to steal objects using Peter's new invention, super sticky formula. They accidentally bring CAL into WEB-Quarters, and they must stop him from getting the Web off fluid. "Test Your Super Strength": Rhino causes havoc at an amusement park while trying to show his strength, and Spidey teams up with Hulk to stop him while helping him control his anger.
5	5	"Pecking Prankster Pigeons"	Kent Redeker	August 27, 2021	108	0.30
5	5	"Green Thumb"	Henry Gifford	August 27, 2021	108	0.30
"Pecking Prankster Pigeons": After a pigeon steals Peter's boat, Team Spidey learns that Green Goblin is using a device to mind-control the pigeons and steal people's belongings and must stop him. "Green Thumb": While Peter and Bootsie are in the garden, he witnesses snow falling instead of the usual sunny weather and, after learning from WEB-STER that Green Goblin's weather-controlling device is causing unusual weather across the city, teams up with Ms. Marvel to stop him.
6	6	"Mother's Day Mayhem"	Kerri Grant	September 3, 2021	104	0.19
6	6	"Not-So-Fun House"	Josh Haber	September 3, 2021	104	0.19
"Mother's Day Mayhem": Doc Ock floods the park to ruin Mother's Day, and Team Spidey must stop her before she puts more people in danger. While on the mission, Gwen thinks she could do it all by herself so her mother can spend time with her on Mother's Day, but she goes without Peter and Miles. The boys follow her and tell her that she can catch Doc Ock if she, Miles, and Peter work together. "Not-So-Fun House": Team Spidey is excited to go to the amusement park, but Miles cannot decide which ride to go on. After Green Goblin shows up and introduces a fun house, they must stop him before it hurts children.
7	7	"Camping Conundrum"	Liza Palmer	September 10, 2021	109	0.32
7	7	"The Great Green Crime Spree"	Robert Vargas	September 10, 2021	109	0.32
"Camping Conundrum": Jefferson Morales takes Team Spidey camping at the local park, but their trip is disrupted when the nearby dam is about to leak. While Jefferson works to save a family of red foxes, they work to plug the leak before a flood threatens the park. Along the way, Miles wants to do everything all by himself, but he has to learn to accept help from Peter and Gwen or things will start to get worse if Miles doesn't let anyone help him. "The Great Green Crime Spree": Peter and Gwen work to find evidence to prove if Hulk is behind a crime spree happening in the city while preventing Hulk from getting angry and avoiding being caught by Helen Stacy. They soon discover that Green Goblin and Rhino were behind the crime spree and framed Hulk for it, with Green Goblin painting Rhino green to resemble Hulk. They must prove Hulk's innocence to Helen and apprehend Green Goblin and Rhino.
8	8	"Rocket Rhino!"	Mark Drop	October 1, 2021	105	0.19
8	8	"Trick or TRACE-E"	Jonathan Hurwitz	October 1, 2021	105	0.19
"Rocket Rhino!": Peter and Miles must stop Rhino from causing trouble using a super powered jetpack belonging to Black Panther. "Trick or TRACE-E": After TRACE-E accidentally lands in one of Green Goblin's pumpkins, Team Spidey must save her.
9	9	"Gob-zilla"	Liza Palmer	October 8, 2021	111	0.30
9	9	"Speedy Spidey Delivery"	Claudia Silver	October 8, 2021	111	0.30
"Gob-zilla": While Aunt May is at the farmer's market, Green Goblin attacks with a robotic dinosaur and Team Spidey must stop him. "Speedy Spidey Delivery": On Hulk's birthday, Ms. Marvel informs Team Spidey that she forgot to bring the cake from the bakery. Peter gets it while Gwen and Miles help Ms. Marvel and Black Panther put up the decorations. But Miles and Gwen think Spidey needs help with that cake because it's a huge job, but Spidey thinks he can do it without their help. However, Green Goblin and Rhino steal Hulk's cake, and while Peter subdues them, the delivery is complicated when Doc Ock gets involved by stealing the cake, having CAL free Green Goblin and Rhino, and trapping Spidey while throwing herself a party. With help from TRACE-E, Peter is freed and the villains are apprehended. When Hulk arrives to his birthday party and sees his cake, he finds it a mess and claims that it is his favorite cake, "Green Smash Cake".
10	10	"Good Guy Gobby"	Liza Palmer	October 22, 2021	112	0.20
10	10	"Spider Monkey"	Claudia Silver	October 22, 2021	112	0.20
"Good Guy Gobby": Miles shows off his new vehicle, the Techno-Racer. Later, Team Spidey hears the Spidey Alert and learn that a kitten is stuck in a tree. As they save it, Green Goblin pretends to be a hero, later trapping Miles by stealing his comm-link and his Techno-Racer as he is heading to WEB-Quarters. "Spider Monkey": Peter and Gwen are excited to go to the zoo and see Skippey the Monkey, but must save him after Rhino takes him.
11	11	"CAT-astrophe"	Jonathan Hurwitz	November 12, 2021	107	0.31
11	11	"Swing With a Stomp"	Baljeet Rai	November 12, 2021	107	0.31
"CAT-astrophe": Peter and Aunt May are on their way to a cat show when Bootsie runs off and is enlarged by Doc Ock's new invention, the Octo Sizer, and chases CAL, Doc Ock’s octobot minion. Peter teams up with CAL to stop Doc Ock and return her to normal size. "Swing With a Stomp": Doc Ock uses her hypno-beat to control everyone at a concert, including Peter and Miles. However, Gwen manages to avoid being controlled and works to free them so they can stop Doc Ock.
12	12	"A Very Spidey Christmas"	Robert Vargas & Mike Kubat	November 27, 2021	113	0.28
12	12	"Gobby on Ice"	Robert Vargas	November 27, 2021	113	0.28
"A Very Spidey Christmas": Gwen tries to turn on the Christmas lights, but realizes that the remote is not working and that inside the Christmas tree is one of Doc Ock's tentacles. While Team Spidey stops the tree, Doc Ock steals presents from people as well as Helen Stacy's phone, allowing her to impersonate her. Team Spidey must work together to stop Doc Ock and return the presents. "Gobby on Ice": After Miles accidentally breaks his com-link, Green Goblin uses the remote control to make snowmen move and ruin everyone's day, and Team Spidey must stop him.
13	13	"Going Green"	Baljeet Rai	December 3, 2021	115	0.20
13	13	"Coming Clean"	Gene Laufenberg	December 3, 2021	115	0.20
"Going Green": While Spidey grows something, Green Goblin uses purple gas to leave people coughing, and Peter, Miles, and Black Panther must stop him. "Coming Clean": After Peter's new invention, a blob designed to clean up trash, goes haywire and starts eating other things, he and Miles must stop it before Aunt May returns.
14	14	"Web Beard's Treasure"	Henry Gifford & Claudia Silver	December 10, 2021	116	0.27
14	14	"Washed Away"	Gene Laufenberg & Claudia Silver	December 10, 2021	116	0.27
"Web Beard's Treasure": Doc Ock follows Team Spidey as they both search for Web Beard's treasure. "Washed Away": As Peter makes adjustments on TRACE-E, he and Ms. Marvel learn from WEB-STER that Green Goblin has flooded the park and must stop him.
15	15	"Spin Rushes In"	Written by : Mike Kubat; Story by : Baljeet Rai	January 7, 2022	117	0.25
15	15	"Bridge Bandit"	Henry Gifford	January 7, 2022	117	0.25
"Spin Rushes In": Doc Ock takes away Mile's Arachno-Sting power and puts him and other people to sleep to steal their belongings. Miles must stop her and get his powers back. "Bridge Bandit": Green Goblin and Rhino cause a traffic jam on the Midtown Bridge, telling people that they will not move until they get money. Team Spidey grab their vehicles and must stop them so they can get home in time to make dinner for Aunt May.
16	16	"Art Attack!"	Claudia Silver	January 28, 2022	118	0.19
16	16	"Puppy Pandemonium"	Mike Kubat	January 28, 2022	118	0.19
"Art Attack!": Team Spidey must stop Green Goblin before he ruins the paintings in the museum, including "The Lady in the Green Dress". "Puppy Pandemonium": Peter's neighbor Mrs. Hernandez tells him to look after her dog Sarah while he and Gwen go to the mall and stop Rhino.
17	17	"Goblin Island"	Mike Kubat	February 18, 2022	119	0.24
17	17	"Doc Ock and the Shocktobots"	Written by : Claudia Silver; Story by : Harrison Wilcox & Claudia Silver	February 18, 2022	119	0.24
"Goblin Island": Peter, Miles and Gwen receive the Spidey Alert and see an island, which they head to. However, when they arrive, Green Goblin steals Ghost-Spider's Ghost-Copter and strands Team Spidey on Goblin Island. They leave the island by boat and Ghost-Spider retrieve her Ghost-Copter from him. "Doc Ock and the Shocktobots": Doc Ock once again steals Black Panther's Vibranium to make Shocktobots, an electrical type of Octobots, and he and Peter must stop her and retrieve the Vibranium.
18	18	"Peter's Pendant Predicament"	Mike Kubat	February 25, 2022	120	0.18
18	18	"TWIST-E"	Bart Jennett	February 25, 2022	120	0.18
"Peter's Pendant Predicament": Aunt May finds a dusty necklace and gives it to Peter, telling him that it has been in her family for years. Later, Green Goblin attacks on his Goblin Glider and steals the necklace, and Team Spidey must stop him and retrieve the necklace. "TWIST-E": As Peter is adding detail to TRACE-E, he gets an alert and learns from WEB-STER that Aunt May is looking for him. While Peter is gone, Miles decides to build a robot that he names TWIST-E. However, TWIST-E goes haywire and causes destruction until Doc Ock steals it to reprogram it for evil. At Doc Ock's lair, Peter and Miles web up Doc Ock and leave her for the police to arrest. With Peter's help, TWIST-E is officially completed and becomes his Spider-Bot.
19	19	"Itsy-Bitsy Spiders"	Henry Gifford	March 11, 2022	110	0.26
19	19	"Gobby's Rotten Pumpkin Hunt"	Baljeet Rai	March 11, 2022	110	0.26
"Itsy-Bitsy Spiders": Doc Ock recharges the shrink ray by stealing the city's electricity system and shrinks Team Spidey until they return to normal size by tricking her into growing them. "Gobby's Rotten Pumpkin Hunt": Green Goblin has hidden three pumpkins and Team Spidey must find them and stop his pumpkin hunt.
20	20	"The Wozzlesnook"	Mike Kubat	March 18, 2022 (Note: This episode was first released on Disney+ on March 16, 2022.)	121	0.21
20	20	"Superhero Switcheroo"	Claudia Silver	March 18, 2022	121	0.21
"The Wozzlesnook": After seeing a movie about a monster called the Wozzlesnook, Team Spidey investigates Wozzlesnook sightings and discover that Rhino disguised himself as the Wozzlesnook as part of his latest heist. "Superhero Switcheroo": While on a crime spree, Doc Ock's invention causes Peter and Hulk to switch abilities, and they must master their new abilities to defeat Doc Ock and regain their abilities.
21	21	"Aunt May's Mess"	Claudia Silver	March 25, 2022	122	0.20
21	21	"Foam Sweet Foam"	Mike Kubat	March 25, 2022	122	0.20
"Aunt May's Mess": After Aunt May accidentally takes Doc Ock's floating gizmo at the antiques store, Team Spidey must retrieve it. "Foam Sweet Foam": Spidey creates a new web formula, but it does not work. When Green Goblin terrorizes the city, Team Spidey must stop him while he learns how to make the formula correctly.
22	22	"Freeze! It's Team Spidey"	Mike Kubat	April 15, 2022	123	0.24
22	22	"A Sticky Situation"	Bart Jennett	April 15, 2022	123	0.24
"Freeze! It's Team Spidey": Team Spidey's webs do not work in the heat, and they must figure out how to cool down and make them work while stopping Rhino from terrorizing the city. "A Sticky Situation": After Peter accidentally glues himself to Gwen with his new web formula, they must work together to stop Green Goblin and Rhino.
23	23	"Rhinoctopus"	Claudia Silver	May 6, 2022	124	0.19
23	23	"A Pumpkin Problem"	Mike Kubat	May 6, 2022	124	0.19
"Rhinoctopus": After Rhino and Doc Ock unsuccessfully attempt to steal a truck and its valuables, Doc Ock frustratingly throws away her tentacle suit and Rhino steals her tentacle suit and calls himself "Rhinoctopus". Team Spidey must stop him before it is too late. While on the mission, Gwen and Miles need Peter to control his anger. "A Pumpkin Problem": Green Goblin steals Peter and Aunt May’s pumpkin, and he must stop him.
24	24	"Catch and Release"	Baljeet Rai & Claudia Silver	June 17, 2022	114	N/A
24	24	"Construction Destruction"	Henry Gifford	June 17, 2022	114	N/A
"Catch and Release": Miles's Father's Day trip is ruined by Doc Ock, who plans to take over the harbor, as CAL traps him and Jefferson in Doc Ock's lair. "Construction Destruction": A squirrel wreaks havoc as Peter, Hulk, and Ms. Marvel try to get it down.
25	25	"Parade Panic"	Written by : Bart Jennett; Story by : Claudia Silver & Bart Jennett	July 8, 2022	125	0.32
25	25	"The Case of the Burgling Book Bandit"	Alexa Harzan	July 8, 2022	125	0.32
"Parade Panic": Team Spidey partakes in a parade and do tricks for the crowd, but Doc Ock, Green Goblin, and Rhino attempt to disrupt the parade. "The Case of the Burgling Book Bandit": Team Spidey investigates the disappearance of library books and learn that Doc Ock is responsible, as CAL has taken an interest in reading.

=== Season 2: Glow Webs Glow/Web-Spinners (2022–23) ===
Episodes were directed by Darren Bachynski.

No. overall	No. in season	Title	Written by	Storyboarded by	Original release date	Prod. code	U.S. viewers (millions)
26	1	"Electro's Gotta Glow"	Mike Kubat	Kyle Manske	August 19, 2022	201	0.20
26	1	"Black Cat Chaos"	Written by : Claudia Silver; Story by : Harrison Wilcox	Kyle Manske	August 19, 2022	201	0.20
"Electro's Gotta Glow": As Miles' mother Rio Morales takes Team Spidey out for a night in Times Square, Electro attacks to steal electricity. With their new glow suits and glow webs, they must restore power to Times Square and defeat Electro without getting shocked. "Black Cat Chaos": Iron Man assists Peter in pursuing Black Cat and tells him how his armor that can be summoned from his sunglasses works. After Black Cat steals the sunglasses, Peter must catch Black Cat while Iron Man works on an invention to deactivate his armor.
27	2	"Lights Out!"	Written by : Claudia Silver; Story by : Harrison Wilcox	Mauro Casalese	August 26, 2022	202	0.12
27	2	"Sandman Won't Share!"	Mike Kubat	Mauro Casalese	August 26, 2022	202	0.12
"Lights Out!": Team Spidey has a sleepover as Aunt May teaches them the importance of sleep. After Green Goblin powers up the lighthouse on Goblin Island with help from Electro, preventing people from getting sleep, they must deactivate the lighthouse and defeat them. "Sandman Won't Share!": During a day at the beach, Aunt May goes roller blading while Team Spidey builds a sandcastle. However, everyone's activities are disrupted when Sandman attacks, destroying the sandcastles and driving everyone off the beach while planning to make the best sandcastle on the beach. As Sandman can turn into sand and pop up wherever he wants to avoid their attacks, Team Spidey must find a way to defeat him.
28	3	"Bootsie's Day Out"	Claudia Silver	Kyle Manske	September 2, 2022	203	0.22
28	3	"Trouble at Tony's"	Sib Ventress	Kyle Manske	September 2, 2022	203	0.22
"Bootsie's Day Out": Peter works to get Bootsie home after a trip to the vet and shows Gwen and Miles how he trained her to walk on a leash. When this fails, Peter works on making a cat carrier for Bootsie, during which she runs off and gets used in Black Cat's latest theft of shiny objects. Team Spidey must retrieve Bootsie and thwart Black Cat's heists. "Trouble at Tony's": At Tony Stark's apartment, he shows Team Spidey his gadgets, including one he is developing: gauntlets that can shoot fire, water, or electricity. Electro hears about the gauntlet and want to steal it, luring Tony away by posing as a representative of the Mayor of Manhattan's office and claiming that she wants to see him. While Tony is away, Team Spidey must stop Electro from getting the electricity gauntlet.
29	4	"Sonic Boom Boom"	Mike Kubat	Roxy Beiklik	September 16, 2022	204	0.14
29	4	"Mini Golf Goof"	Alexa Harzan	Roxy Beiklik	September 16, 2022	204	0.14
"Sonic Boom Boom": As Team Spidey is at the beach, crabs invade and drive everybody away. They enlist oceanographer Isla Coralton to help, as she notes that something similar happened to the octopuses. They discover that Doc Ock is responsible, testing her Boom Boom Blaster in the ocean and planning to use it on the city. "Mini Golf Goof": Gwen and Helen are playing on the miniature golf course when Gwen struggles with the windmill shot. However, they soon realize that the golf balls are not coming out of the course and discover that Green Goblin is responsible. Gwen helps Helen evacuate the golfers and calls on Ant-Man and Wasp to help her get inside the windmill.
30	5	"Li'l Hulk"	Claudia Silver	Kyle Manske	September 30, 2022	205	0.16
30	5	"Surprise Party Surprise"	Mike Kubat	Kyle Manske	September 30, 2022	205	0.16
"Li'l Hulk": Hulk shows Team Spidey his hangout, Hulk's Smash Yard, where he practices his smashing. When Green Goblin turns Hulk into a baby using his new invention, the Baby Boomer, Team Spidey must thwart his heist while babysitting Hulk and trying to restore him to normal. "Surprise Party Surprise": On Gwen's birthday, Peter and Miles prepare a surprise party for her with help from Iron Man, Hulk, Ms. Marvel, and Black Panther. As they plan to bring her to WEB-Quarters, they contend with Rhino stealing pizzas from others, Electro tampering with the stoplights and a train, Green Goblin stealing a safe, Black Cat robbing a jewelry store, and Sandman using a pile of sand to cause traffic.
31	6	"Can't Stop Dancing"	Bart Jennett	Roxy Beiklik	October 14, 2022	206	0.18
31	6	"The Ant Thief"	Written by : Sib Ventress; Story by : Claudia Silver	Roxy Beiklik	October 14, 2022	206	0.18
"Can't Stop Dancing": On Meet the Superheroes Day, Team Spidey attends the event with Hulk, Reptil, and Ms. Marvel. and Peter works on a presentation, as he is persuaded that there is no need for his topics. Green Goblin crashes the event using his “Breakdance Boogie Blaster”, which causes anyone hit by it to dance uncontrollably. With Hulk, Reptil, Ms. Marvel, Gwen, and Miles affected by its powers, Peter must thwart the Green Goblin's plan and get everyone to stop dancing. "The Ant Thief": As Gwen and Miles visit the museum, it is robbed and the Royal Diamonds Exhibit is stolen. They find one of the diamonds in a hole and enlist Ant-Man and Wasp to enter it using the shrink disks, which contain particles that Ant-Man invented, and shrink as well. After removing a strange helmet from an ant, they discover that Doc Ock mind-controlled the ants to steal the diamonds.
32	7	"Sand Trapped"	Mike Kubat	Kyle Manske	October 21, 2022	207	0.13
32	7	"Too Much Fun"	Claudia Silver	Kyle Manske	October 21, 2022	207	0.13
"Sand Trapped": As Team Spidey tries out Peter's board game, they learn that Sandman is causing trouble at the beach. When they arrive, they become stuck in Sandman's sand maze and must escape and defeat him. "Too Much Fun": Team Spidey is at the amusement park with Aunt May, but Electro, displeased with a ride on the Ferris wheel she rode, uses her powers to make the rides faster, causing Peter to suffer from nausea after eating too many corn dogs. Gwen and Miles corral the rides as Peter recovers and aids them in stopping the rides and defeating Electro.
33	8	"Halted Holiday"	Alexa Harzan	Roxy Beiklik	November 11, 2022	208	0.17
33	8	"Merry Spidey Christmas"	Written by : Mike Kubat; Story by : Harrison Wilcox	Roxy Beiklik	November 11, 2022	208	0.17
"Halted Holiday": Aunt May is hosting Thanksgiving at her house as Rio's mother Gloria is running late due to traffic at the airport. Team Spidey discovers that Doc Ock and her Octobots are responsible for causing the traffic using the Octoblocker forcefield and stealing people's treats and food. "Merry Spidey Christmas": During the Christmas season, the Mayor of New York hosts an event where Team Spidey lights up the decorations. However, Electro, Green Goblin, and Rhino attack and Electro steals the electricity, allowing the Green Goblin to steal the presents. After the Green Goblin and Rhino are subdued, Team Spidey uses their Glow Webs to decorate the area and work to teach Electro, Green Goblin, and Rhino the meaning of Christmas.
34	9	"An Egg-Cellent Adventure"	Claudia Silver	Kyle Manske	December 9, 2022	209	0.16
34	9	"The Hangout Headache"	Mike Kubat	Kyle Manske	December 9, 2022	209	0.16
"An Egg-Cellant Adventure": Team Spidey goes to the zoo where Jefferson is volunteering at and see a rare bird called the Blue-Bellied Wobble Walker, which lays an egg that is soon to hatch. After Black Cat infiltrates the zoo and steals the egg, they must defeat her and retrieve the egg. "The Hangout Headache": While working on an experiment in Web-Quarters, Spidey learns from WEB-STER that Green Goblin is at Jerry's Junkyard, the location of Hulk's Smash Yard. While Jerry's magnet crane cleans up the mess that the Green Goblin caused, Peter invites Hulk to WEB-Quarters while he has WEB-STER search for Green Goblin. Once WEB-STER finds him, they return to Jerry's Junkyard, where he steals the magnet from the magnet crane to steal anything made of metal.
35	10	"Follow That Sea Monster!"	Claudia Silver	Roxy Beiklik	December 16, 2022	210	0.15
35	10	"It's Bad to be Gooed"	Written by : Denise Downer; Story by : Harrison Wilcox	Roxy Beiklik	December 16, 2022	210	0.15
"Follow that Sea Monster": At the aquarium, as Miles goes to see Squishy the Octopus, WEB-STER alerts them about a sea monster sighting. At the docks, they meet up with Reptil and learn from a sea captain and his crew member that a sea monster with tentacles stole a crate from their ship. Reptil assumes a Plesiosaurus form as Team Spidey enters the ocean and finds that Doc Ock is responsible and operating her Mega-Ock suit. "It's Bad to be Gooed": Team Spidey goes camping with Jefferson and finds orange goo floating in the river that has affected the river turtles, which Jefferson takes to the ranger station to care for. They find that the dam is leaking goo and Green Goblin has converted its interior into a goo factory, and must stop him and return the dam to normal.
36	11	"Liberty on the Loose"	Alexa Harzan	Kyle Manske	January 6, 2023	211	0.13
36	11	"Green Goblin's Dino Disaster"	Mike Kubat	Kyle Manske	January 6, 2023	211	0.13
"Liberty on the Loose": Miles and Rio attend an event held by Ant-Man and Wasp at the Statue of Liberty, where they plan to shine up its torch. As they finish cleaning the torch, Black Cat steals Ant-Man's gauntlet, shrinks the Statue of Liberty and makes herself big, and Miles teams up with them to apprehend Black Cat and retrieve the Statue of Liberty. "Green Goblin's Dino Disaster": As Peter and Reptil host an event at the zoo about dinosaurs, Green Goblin attacks in his T-Rex 3000 and it goes haywire after a squirrel gets inside it, and they must get the squirrel out of the T-Rex 3000 and deactivate it.
37	12	"Spidey Tidies Up"	Written by : Claudia Silver; Story by : Harrison Wilcox	Roxy Beiklik	January 27, 2023	212	0.13
37	12	"Oh No, Tomatoes!"	Written by : Mike Kubat; Story by : Harrison Wilcox	Roxy Beiklik	January 27, 2023	212	0.13
"Spidey Tidies Up": Sandman emerges from the sandbox in Central Park and fills Central Park with sand. Peter enlists Iron Man to help him defeat Sandman using a vacuum to suck him up. "Oh No, Tomatoes!": Miles is watering Rio's tomatoes, which she will use to make salsa for a community dinner run by Mr. Kim. While looking for food, Rhino breaks into the community center and steals the tomatoes, which Miles must retrieve.
38	13	"Clean Power"	Written by : Claudia Silver; Story by : Harrison Wilcox	Kyle Manske	February 10, 2023 (Note: This episode was first released on Disney+ on February 9, 2023.)	213	0.14
38	13	"Doc Ock & The Rocktobots"	Written by : Mike Kubat; Story by : Harrison Wilcox	Kyle Manske	February 10, 2023	213	0.14
"Clean Power": George Stacy and Helen Stacy establish a wind turbine to power up the amusement park. When it is activated, Electro crashes the event and steals the energy from the amusement park. Team Spidey finds that Electro has hooked up a cable to the wind turbine and follow it underwater to a cave that leads to Goblin Island. "Doc Ock & The Rocktobots": Team Spidey are asked to perform at the children's concert in Central Park, where toys are being donated. However, the event is delayed after Doc Ock crashes the promotion with her band, Doc Ock & The Rocktobots, planning to use the performance to steal the toys. Team Spidey makes their way to the concert, where they find that Green Goblin, Electro, and Rhino are part of Doc Ock & The Rocktobots and must stop them and save the concert.
39	14	"Pirate Plunder Blunder"	Written by : Mike Kubat; Story by : Bart Jennett	Roxy Beiklik	February 24, 2023	214	0.19
39	14	"Bad Bot"	Claudia Silver	Roxy Beiklik	February 24, 2023	214	0.19
"Pirate Plunder Blunder": Aunt May brings Team Spidey to a pirate ship called the Magnificent Muttonchop owned by Web Beard the Pirate, which Mr. Von Carnegie has set up as outdoor exhibit. Green Goblin poses as a pirate captain to sell his special pirate hats, which causes those who wear them to become pirates under his command. He has them plunder the pier while taking the Magnificent Muttonchop to Goblin Island. Team Spidey must free the mind-controlled people and defeat Green Goblin. "Bad Bot": Team Spidey puts TRACE-E through an obstacle course to improve its training, after which WEB-STER informs them that something large is rampaging in Central Park. They discover that it is a giant robot and that Doc Ock and CAL lured them into a trap as part of their plot to switch TRACE-E with an evil duplicate. With Doc Ock having trapped them in a laser cage, TRACE-E must escape to rescue Team Spidey and defeat Doc Ock and Fake TRACE-E.
40	15	"Spin Saves the Day"	Written by : Claudia Silver; Story by : Mike Kubat & Alexa Harzan	Roxy Beiklik	March 17, 2023	216	0.11
40	15	"Water Woes"	Mike Kubat	Roxy Beiklik	March 17, 2023	216	0.11
"Spin Saves the Day": At the WEB-Quarters, Peter invents a bounce shield and Miles tries his Arachno Sting on it, causing his right arm to fall asleep. He stays behind while Peter and Gwen head out to stop Electro, who is draining power from the city. After his arm heals, he must catch up to Team Spidey to help them defeat Electro. "Water Woes": On a hot day, Peter is watering the garden when the water stops flowing across the neighborhood. At WEB-Quarters, Team Spidey learns from WEB-STER that water is disappearing across the city. After finding a hose that is draining the community pool, Team Spidey follows it to the sewers and follow a pipe to Goblin Island. There, they find that Doc Ock and Green Goblin are using the Island's lighthouse to control the city's water supply and must defeat them and restore water to the city.
41	16	"Tunnel Trouble"	Written by : Eugene Son; Story by : Mike Kubat & Alexa Harzan	Kyle Manske	March 24, 2023 (Note: This episode was first released on Disney+ on March 8, 2023.)	219	0.15
41	16	"Mystery on Goblin Island"	Written by : Bart Jennett; Story by : Claudia Silver	Kyle Manske	March 24, 2023	219	0.15
"Tunnel Trouble": George Stacy takes Team Spidey to the movie theater to see Action Cat 4: Kittens in Space. As they take the subway to the theater, an error occurs in the subway and George goes to investigate. A bystander informs them that Electro was sighted in the tunnels and they find that she is draining electricity from the tracks. They must defeat Electro and get the subway running again. "Mystery on Goblin Island": At the harbor, Team Spidey finds Mr. Von Carnegie, who is heading to an island where Web-Beard buried his treasure. At Goblin Island, he finds a treasure map, which Green Goblin and Rhino aim to steal to find the treasure for themselves. WEB-STER picks up his distress call as Team Spidey heads to Goblin Island to rescue him and stop Green Goblin and Rhino from obtaining the treasure.
42	17	"The Maltese Kitten"	Claudia Silver	Roxy Beiklik	April 14, 2023	217	0.22
42	17	"A Day With Black Panther"	Written by : Mike Kubat; Story by : Claudia Silver	Roxy Beiklik	April 14, 2023	217	0.22
"The Maltese Kitten": Team Spidey learns from Aunt May that she will be donating to the museum, which is displaying a new exhibit called the Maltese Kitten. After thwarting Black Cat's attempt to steal it, Mr. Von Carnegie asks Team Spidey to guard it, as Doc Ock wants its jewels. After being double-crossed, Black Cat and Team Spidey must work together to retrieve the Maltese Kitten. "A Day with Black Panther": Spin meets up with Black Panther for a tour of New York City, but they take a detour when they stop Electro from disrupting a concert. After resuming their tour, they get pizza made by Moe, but must stop Electro from ruining their tour by such methods as burning the pizza, stealing the Panther Patroller, and destroying Mr. Kielbasa's hot dog cart, the green screens in Times Square, and the subway tracks.
43	18	"The New Villain in Town"	Mike Kubat	Kyle Manske	April 28, 2023	218	0.19
43	18	"Spidey Cat"	Claudia Silver	Kyle Manske	April 28, 2023	218	0.19
"The New Villain in Town": CAL steals a part needed for Doc Ock's Destructo-Bot, but they have a falling out after CAL steals the Destructo-Bot. As Team Spidey works to protect everyone, they must defeat the Destructo-Bot and break up Doc Ock and CAL's arguments. "Spidey Cat": After giving Bootsie a Spidey mask, Peter and Miles bring her with them as Green Goblin causes havoc in town. He baits them into a warehouse and traps them in his Spidey Power Snatcher machine to steal their powers, causing her to receive their powers. They must escape and retrieve Bootsie so the power transfer can be undone.
44	19	"A Syrupy Solution"	Written by : Matt Hoverman; Story by : Bart Jennett	Roxy Beiklik	May 12, 2023	220	0.13
44	19	"Little Ant, Big Problem"	Mike Kubat	Roxy Beiklik	May 12, 2023	220	0.13
"A Syrupy Solution": Doc Ock and CAL cause trouble in the forest by putting sap on the ground, and Gwen must find a way to stop them after her web shooters are covered in sap. "Little Ant, Big Problem": Peter's gauntlet causes his pet ant to grow to the size of a dog and wreak havoc in the house. He enlists the help of Ant-Man and Wasp to find a way to return him to normal size before Aunt May finishes preparing dinner for the guests.
45	20	"Ock Tower"	Claudia Silver	Kyle Manske	May 26, 2023	221	0.11
45	20	"Outsmarted by Art"	Mike Kubat	Kyle Manske	May 26, 2023	221	0.11
Ock Tower: At Stark Tower, Peter works on repairing his web-shooter while Tony Stark works on his floating music player and shows him his personal workspace and the Magnetic Mop, which cleans up parts for recycling. As they respond to trouble in the park where Octobots are causing trouble, they learn that it was diversion for Doc Ock to take over Stark Tower and take Stark's technology to convert CAL into Iron-CAL. With TRACE-E inside the tower, Peter and Iron Man must sneak past the Octobots to get in and defeat Doc Ock and Iron-CAL. Outsmarted by Art: The community art fair is being held at the community garden, and Miles Hulk are helping out. However, Sandman attacks and ruins the art, including Hulk's sand art, while claiming to be the best artist, later causing trouble at the mall and a construction site. As he takes advantage of Hulk's rage to outsmart him, Miles and Hulk must stop Sandman before he causes more havoc.
46	21	"Super Scooter"	Written by : Mike Kubat; Story by : Bart Jennett	Roxy Beiklik	June 9, 2023	222	0.15
46	21	"The Lost Web Shooter"	Written by : Becca Topol; Story by : Bart Jennett & Harrison Wilcox	Roxy Beiklik	June 9, 2023	222	0.15
Super Scooter: As Team Spidey uses their vehicles to get to Hulk's hangout, they meet up with him, Iron Man, Black Panther, and Ms. Marvel. However, they are interrupted by Doc Ock's transmission, as she has dispatched Electro to steal the Arc Reactor from Iron Man's car and use it in her invention. With Black Panther going after a TV and Hulk and Iron Man sidelined for their own reasons, the remaining heroes pursue Electro, Rhino, and Green Goblin, during which Peter and Miles are incapacitated. Gwen and Ms. Marvel are the only ones left to stop Doc Ock and Green Goblin, who have transformed Goblin Island's lighthouse. The Lost Web Shooter: Peter finds Doc Ock robbing an armored car and pursues her to the park, where their fight over the money bags causes him to lose one of his web shooters. Spidey contacts the Spider-Bots and asks them to look for his web shooter while he helps Aunt May in the garden. As Doc Ock sends CAL to get the money bag she hid in the tree, two children, Will and Lizzy, find the web shooter and use it help people. When CAL finds them and Doc Ock attacks them to get the web shooter, Peter has TRACE-E stall CAL until he can arrive to retrieve his web shooter and defeat Doc Ock and CAL.
47	22	"Catnap Caper"	Daka Hermon	Kyle Manske	July 7, 2023	223	N/A
47	22	"Bunny Bonanza"	Written by : Alexa Harzan; Story by : Becca Topol	Kyle Manske	July 7, 2023	223	N/A
Catnap Caper: After stopping Black Cat from stealing everyone's stuffed animals, Team Spidey must help her find her stuffed animal Bloopy. Bunny Bonanza: Team Spidey must help Hulk organize the bunnies at the community center and stop Doc Ock and her duplicate machine after she multiplies Hulk's bunny, Bun-Buns.
48	23	"Dino-Rama"	Written by : Josh Haber; Story by : Bart Jennett	Roxy Beiklik	August 11, 2023	224	N/A
48	23	"Daytime at Nighttime"	Written by : Claudia Silver; Story by : Alexa Harzan	Roxy Beiklik	August 11, 2023	224	N/A
Dino-Rama: Peter, Gwen, and Reptil head to the museum, where Green Goblin and Rhino are causing havoc. During the battle, Reptil's jewel breaks into three pieces, trapping him in his T-Rex form, as well as turning both Peter and Green Goblin into Velociraptors, Rhino into a Triceratops, and Gwen into a Pterodactyl. Green Goblin and Rhino steal the third piece of the jewel and Reptil must help Peter and Gwen master their new abilities to defeat them and retrieve the jewel piece to return everyone to normal. Daytime at Nighttime: Team Spidey is camping in the woods with Jefferson when Electro disturbs all the nocturnal animals with her fireworks show and they must stop her.
49	24	"Stolen WEB-Quarters"	Written by : Bart Jennett; Story by : Harrison Wilcox	Kyle Manske	August 18, 2023	225	N/A
49	24	"Spideys in Space!"	Written by : Mike Kubat; Story by : Harrison Wilcox	Kyle Manske	August 18, 2023	225	N/A
Stolen WEB-Quarters: Team Spidey gets an alert in Times Square and encounter a new villain, Arnim Zola, who is stealing stuff. After he transfers Peter's comm link and takes over WEB-Quarters, Team Spidey must decide whether to destroy their WEB-Quarters to save the day. Spideys in Space!: Iron Man invites Team Spidey to follow him to the moon to test their WEB-Spinner suits, but when they arrive, Doc Ock and CAL have kidnapped him. Team Spidey must use their WEB-Spinner suits to save him and stop Doc Ock and CAL from building a lair on the Moon.
50	25	"Hide & Seek"	Written by : Claudia Silver; Story by : Mike Kubat	Roxy Beiklik	August 25, 2023	226	N/A
50	25	"Whale of a Time"	Daka Hermon	Roxy Beiklik	August 25, 2023	226	N/A
Hide & Seek: At the community counter, Thing is playing hide-and-seek at the community center with kids, including Miles, when WEB-STER informs them that the Green Goblin is causing trouble downtown using an invisibility device. They team up with the Thing to find a way to catch the Green Goblin. Whale of a Time: Team Spidey and Aunt May are on a whale-watching tour run by Isla Coralton, but the event is disrupted by a sound that drives the whales off. They investigate and free a baby whale, soon discovering that Doc Ock and her whale submarine are responsible for disrupting the whales so she can take over the harbor.
51	26	"Rollin Rhino"	Written by : Alexa Harzan; Story by : Becca Topol	Kyle Manske	September 1, 2023	227	N/A
51	26	"The Octopus and the Kitty Cat"	Mike Kubat	Kyle Manske	September 1, 2023	227	N/A
Rollin Rhino: During the annual Roller Race, Team Spidey must stop Rhino, who joins the race, and Green Goblin, who seeks to ensure he wins. The Octopus and the Kitty Cat: Gwen and Miles are playing a dancing video game at the arcade when Doc Ock and CAL use a new invention, the Octo-Portal, to rob the mall, stealing a jeweled octopus from a jewelry store. Though Gwen and Miles subdue CAL and stop Black Cat from stealing the jeweled octopus, they must stop her and Doc Ock after she frees CAL and enlists Black Cat into collaborating on a heist.
52	27	"Go With the Lava Flow"	Mike Kubat	Kyle Manske	September 15, 2023	229	N/A
52	27	"An UnBEElievable Rosh Hashanah"	Alexa Harzan	Kyle Manske	September 15, 2023	229	N/A
Go With the Lava Flow: Team Spidey must save the pink iguanas of the Pink Iguana Sanctuary after Doc Ock mines gems at the volcano they live on, causing it to erupt. An UnBEElievable Rosh Hashanah: On Rosh Hashanah, Peter and Miles arrive at the community center and meet up with the Thing, who has taken up beekeeping. However, the bees fly away, as Green Goblin is controlling them using a special helmet, the Bee-Con, and wants to use their honey to make special goo. Team Spidey teams up with the Thing to head to Goblin Island, save the bees, and defeat Green Goblin.
53	28	"Bootsie's Haunted Adventure"	Mike Kubat	Kyle Manske	September 29, 2023	215	N/A
53	28	"Too Many Tricks, Not Enough Treats"	Bart Jennett	Kyle Manske	September 29, 2023	215	N/A
Bootsie's Haunted Adventure: After Bootsie causes a mess in the kitchen while Aunt May is baking, she escapes when Team Spidey attempts to give her a bath and sneaks into the museum. Team Spidey goes to the museum to save her, but Sandman sneaks in and scares them while trying to steal Egyptian artifacts. Too Many Tricks, Not Enough Treats: Green Goblin activates pumpkin-headed scarecrows and takes candy on Halloween, including Black Cat's bucket of candy. Team Spidey teams up with Black Cat to defeat him and prevent the Halloween Block Party from being ruined.
54	29	"How to Train Your Doggy"	Claudia Silver	Roxy Beiklik	November 10, 2023	228	N/A
54	29	"Dome Alone"	Daka Hermon	Roxy Beiklik	November 10, 2023	228	N/A
How to Train Your Doggy: At the park, Peter and Gwen meet up with Ms. Marvel and she introduces them to her teleporting dog Lockjaw. While showing them how to play fetch, Green Goblin tries to ruin a birthday party and Rhino robs a bank, but after seeing Lockjaw, they try to keep him as their pet and take him to Goblin Island. Peter and Gwen team up with Ms. Marvel to save him. Dome Alone: Team Spidey are helping Thing prepare for the block party at the community center. Following a mishap while trying to drill a hole for a sandbox, Miles heads to WEB-Quarters to get new art supplies. Zola traps Peter, Gwen, and the Thing in a dome surrounding the community center and releases the Hydrabots to cause chaos in the city. Spin must free his friends and defeat Zola and the Hydrabots.

=== Season 3: Web-Spinners/Dino-Webs (2024–25) ===
Mitch Stookey is the director for this season.

No. overall	No. in season	Title	Written by	Storyboarded by	Original release date	Prod. code	U.S. viewers (millions)
55	1	"The Friendly Neighborhood"	Written by : Daka Hermon; Story by : Harrison Wilcox	Kyle Manske	January 8, 2024	301	N/A
55	1	"Flight of the Butterflies"	Greg Johnson	Kyle Manske	January 8, 2024	301	N/A
The Friendly Neighborhood: Team Spidey sets up a community party at the community center with help from Iron Man, Ms. Marvel, Reptil, and the Thing. However, Zola steals their party supplies and others throughout the city. After Zola escapes, Team Spidey follows him to an abandoned warehouse and fights him and the Hydrabots with help from Iron Man. Flight of the Butterflies: Team Spidey and Rio attend an event at the flower garden where the butterflies are getting ready for their migration. Displeased that nobody is at the playground, Sandman crashes the event and captures the butterflies using a sand tornado. After tricking Sandman, Team Spidey must rescue the butterflies from Goblin Island and defeat him.
56	2	"Ock's Obey Ray"	Written by : Claudia Silver & Douglas Tuber & Tim Maile; Story by : Claudia Silver	Roxy Beiklik	January 9, 2024	302	N/A
56	2	"Lemur At Large"	Alexa Harzan	Roxy Beiklik	January 9, 2024	302	N/A
Ock's Obey Ray: Team Spidey visits Hulk to celebrate the birthday of his rabbit Bun Buns. However, after Doc Ock crashes the event and controls Hulk using her Obey Ray, they must free Hulk from the mind control and defeat Doc Ock. Lemur at Large: Gwen, Ant-Man, and Wasp visit the zoo, where they get a tour from Ms. Kimanthi. However, a ring-tailed lemur named Buster steals Wasp's gauntlet and shrinks a zebra, a giraffe, and a lion, allowing them to escape. As they work to round up the animals, they must catch Buster after he grows to large size.
57	3	"Tree Trouble"	Daka Hermon	Kyle Manske	January 10, 2024	303	N/A
57	3	"Stuck In Space"	Written by : Greg Johnson; Story by : Bart Jennett	Kyle Manske	January 10, 2024	303	N/A
Tree Trouble: Team Spidey and Aunt May attend the Apple Blossom Festival in the park, where she introduces them to Sherwood, the oldest tree in New York City. However, Green Goblin attacks and uses a special remote to bring Sherwood to life, and they must save it without damaging it. Stuck in Space: After asteroids break an antenna on the Moon's science center, Spidey, along with the Thing, TRACE-E, and H.E.R.B.I.E., head to the Moon to help repair it. However, Zola steals their ship, leaving them stranded on the Moon. TRACE-E and H.E.R.B.I.E., who were inside the ship when it was stolen, work to reclaim it so Peter and Thing can leave the Moon.
58	4	"Antarctic Adventure"	Written by : Greg Johnson & Michael Olmo; Story by : Claudia Silver	Roxy Beiklik	January 11, 2024	304	N/A
58	4	"Let It Snowball, Let It Snowball, Let It Snowball"	Alexa Harzan	Roxy Beiklik	January 11, 2024	304	N/A
Antarctic Adventure: Team Spidey arrives in Antarctica with Mr. Von Carnegie to search for the lost treasure of Phineas Spinnaker and bring it to the museum. However, they discover that Doc Ock seeks the treasure herself, destroying ice and threatening the penguins in the process, and must stop her. Let It Snowball, Let It Snowball, Let It Snowball: During the holiday season, Jefferson takes Miles to a snowy park to try out his new sled. However, displeased with the wintry conditions, Zola takes control of the park and causes trouble for everyone. While Jefferson distracts Zola, Miles and Jefferson take on Zola in a snowball fight as he unleashes his Hydrabots to aid him.
59	5	"Bubble Trouble"	Daka Hermon	Kyle Manske	January 12, 2024	305	N/A
59	5	"Rainy River Run"	Greg Johnson	Kyle Manske	January 12, 2024	305	N/A
Bubble Trouble: Poppy the Bubble Lady is partaking in the bubble festival in Central Park with help from Peter and Gwen. However, Green Goblin attacks and traps Poppy and several others in slime bubbles, and they must save them. Rainy River Run: Peter builds a miniature raft from popsicle sticks, but after his aunt May's doll washes down a storm drain, he enlists help from Ant-Man to shrink them down and recover it.
60	6	"The Rhino and the Goose"	Alexa Harzan	Roxy Beiklik	January 19, 2024	306	N/A
60	6	"Dog vs Cat"	Written by : Atul N. Rao; Story by : Claudia Silver	Roxy Beiklik	January 19, 2024	306	N/A
The Rhino and the Goose: After learning of the fairy tale of the golden goose, Rhino believes it to be real and steals a goose to obtain golden eggs. However, he is unaware that it has a gosling, and Gwen and Miles must save it and its gosling. Dog vs Cat: Ms. Marvel is playing frisbee with Lockjaw in Central Park when he goes berserk and chases after Black Cat when she steals a bracelet. After learning of this, Team Spidey must stop her.
61	7	"Journey Through Zola"	Greg Johnson	Kyle Manske	January 26, 2024	307	N/A
61	7	"Villaintine's Day"	Alexa Harzan	Kyle Manske	January 26, 2024	307	N/A
Journey Through Zola: Ant-Man and Wasp work with Ghosty and Spin to set up a playground by switching the swing set and clubhouse. However, after Zola steals their grow disk and puts it directly into his robot body and plugs it into his circuits, and grows to tremendous size, Ghosty and Ant-Man must enter his giant robot body to retrieve the disk and shrink him down to normal size while contending with the Hydrabots while Spin and Wasp keep him from destroying the city. Villaintine's Day: On Valentine's Day, Green Goblin and Rhino steal from everyone and Team Spidey pursues them to an abandoned warehouse to recover the stolen goods.
62	8	"Now You See Me, Now You Don't"	Written by : James W. Bates; Story by : Bart Jennett	Roxy Beiklik	February 16, 2024	308	N/A
62	8	"Meet Squirrel Girl"	Written by : Daka Hermon; Story by : Becca Topol	Roxy Beiklik	February 16, 2024	308	N/A
Now You See Me, Now You Don't: Peter invents a ray that causes what it hits to turn invisible. However, after he accidentally causes Gwen to turn invisible and Rhino steals the ray to use in his crimes, they must stop him and return Gwen to normal. Meet Squirrel Girl: Peter and Miles discover that the park's squirrels are acting aggressively and stealing from others because Green Goblin is controlling them, and team up with new hero Squirrel Girl and her sidekick Tippy-Toe to stop him.
63	9	"Car-Tastrophe"	Greg Johnson	Kyle Manske	February 23, 2024	309	N/A
63	9	"Sandman and the Tortoise"	Daka Hermon	Kyle Manske	February 23, 2024	309	N/A
Car-Tastrophe: As Peter is flying his remote-control airplane, he learns that Green Goblin is controlling vehicles around town using remote-controlled darts. After he takes control of Team Spidey's vehicles, they must regain control of them to defeat him. Sandman and the Tortoise: Team Spidey and Ms. Kimathi go to the desert to bring a desert tortoise named Rosie there. However, Sandman attacks and destroys the tortoises' burrows to build a massive sand palace, they must save the turtles and defeat him.
64	10	"Tiny Car Caper"	Written by : Peter Gaffney; Story by : Bart Jennett	Roxy Beiklik	March 15, 2024	310	N/A
64	10	"Tooth Fairy Tricks"	Alexa Harzan	Roxy Beiklik	March 15, 2024	310	N/A
Tiny Car Caper: After being confronted by a mother who yells at Zola for stealing her daughter's toy car, Zola gets enraged at her for saying "How dare you?", he creates a shrinking ray to steal cars from around town. After he kidnaps Helen Stacy, Gwen and Miles must rescue her, restore the cars to normal, and defeat Zola and his Hydrabots. Tooth Fairy Tricks: As Wasp attempts to stop Rhino from stealing teeth from fossils in town, he kidnaps her after mistaking her for a tooth fairy. Peter and Gwen must rescue her and defeat Rhino.
65	11	"Picture Perfect Pandemonium"	Daka Hermon	Kyle Manske	April 12, 2024	311	N/A
65	11	"Catch That Panther Pod"	Greg Johnson	Kyle Manske	April 12, 2024	311	N/A
Picture Perfect Pandemoninum: At the museum, Team Spidey attend an art event held by Mr. Von Carnegie, where the children are preparing for an art show. However, after Zola arrives and steals all their artwork, they must reclaim to art and defeat Zola and the Hydrabots. Catch That Panther Pod: Peter and Black Panther are testing his Panther Pod when CAL attacks, seeking to obtain its Vibranium. However, it accidentally causes the Pod to go out of control with Aunt May inside. They work to reclaim control of the Panther Pod and save Aunt May while competing with Doc Ock and CAL.
66	12	"Iron Zola"	Written by : Kevin Burke and Chris “Doc” Wyatt; Story by : Greg Johnson	Roxy Beiklik	April 26, 2024 (Note: This episode was first released on Disney+ on May 24, 2023.)	312	N/A
66	12	"Aunt May's Birthday Blowout"	Alexa Harzan	Roxy Beiklik	April 26, 2024	312	N/A
Iron Zola: While Iron Man is away on the Moon, Zola copies the design of his armor, intending to become a superhero to replace him, but his attempts to help only cause more harm. Aunt May's Birthday Blowout: Peter takes Aunt May on a hot air balloon ride with Mr. Von Carnegie for her birthday. However, Green Goblin attacks and veers the balloon off course, causing it to go towards a volcanic island. After being stranded in the balloon, Green Goblin is forced to work with Peter to fix the balloon and get off the island before the volcano erupts.
67	13	"Freeze, It's Doc Ock!"	Greg Johnson	Kyle Manske	May 10, 2024	313	N/A
67	13	"Go, Go, Jeff"	Daka Hermon	Kyle Manske	May 10, 2024	313	N/A
Freeze, It's Dock Ock!: After Doc Ock heads to Liberty Island intending to use her invention, the No-Motion Potion, to release paralyzing purple mist on the city, Team Spidey must stop her. Go, Go, Jeff: Peter invents boots that enable him to move at superhuman speeds, but they malfunction after he accidentally spills water on them. Jefferson and Green Goblin later obtain the boots, causing them to zoom around town. Team Spidey must get Jeff's gift back for his birthday party and stop the boots before they are hurt.
68	14	"Zola's Novel Idea"	Written by : Peter Gaffney; Story by : Daka Hermon	Roxy Beiklik & Nicole Wang	June 7, 2024	314	N/A
68	14	"Greatest Hits"	Alexa Harzan	Roxy Beiklik & Nicole Wang	June 7, 2024	314	N/A
Zola's Novel Idea: Peter and Gwen help out Millicent McKeen at her Bookmobile, but after Zola and his Hydrabots steal the Bookmobile with Millicent still inside, they must save her. Greatest Hits: At the museum, Mr. Von Carnegie and Team Spidey open an exhibit with confiscated villainous gadgets, including Doc Ock's Switcheroo Machine, Electro's Electro-Zorber, and Green Goblin's Baby Boomer. However, Dock Ock steals the devices, using the Switcheroo Machine to steal Electro's electricity and the Baby Boomer to turn Electro and Green Goblin into babies. With Hulk and Mr. Von Carnegie watching Electro and Green Goblin, Team Spidey must retrieve the devices and return Electro and Green Goblin to normal. Note: This is the last episode to feature the instrumental version of the theme song in the end credits.
69	15	"Go Dino-Webs Go!"	Written by : Daka Hermon; Story by : Harrison Wilcox	Roxy Beiklik & Irene Huang	August 2, 2024	315	N/A
69	15	"Ghost in the Museum"	Greg Johnson	Roxy Beiklik & Irene Huang	August 2, 2024	315	N/A
Go Dino-Webs Go!: As Team Spidey meets with Reptil at his treehouse, Green Goblin attacks the park with a dinosaur-like robot. He traps Reptil in sticky slime, forcing him to share his powers with Team Spidey, allowing them to transform into their dinosaur forms and fight the Green Goblin. Ghost in the Museum: At the museum, Mr. Von Carnegie shows off the portrait of the pirate Cyrilla Calypso, who was notable for swiping the Crown of the Briny Deep which is on display. Team Spidey later responds to a report of Calypso's ghost appearing but discover that she is actually Doc Ock using a special bracelet that enables her to become intangible.
70	16	"Grow Webs Grow"	Alexa Harzan	Kyle Manske & Irene Huang	August 9, 2024	316	N/A
70	16	"Rio In Space"	Written by : Ricky Roxburgh; Story by : Daka Hermon	Kyle Manske & Irene Huang	August 9, 2024	316	N/A
Grow Webs Grow: Peter, Gwen, and Miles attend the City Park Grow-A-Thon where the most beautiful flower will get a special blue ribbon and be planted in a special spot. The event is crashed by Lizard and his last-minute addition which he tries to enhance it with a formula that backfires. After Aunt May's plant Florentina wins, Lizard makes off with Florentina and plans to improve it with science. Peter, Gwen, and Miles transform into Spidey, Ghost-Spider, and Spin and go after Lizard. In his lair, Lizard makes another formula that endangers Manhattan with its vines and sentient buds. Now Team Spidey must work to restore Florentina even when it attacks Lizard. Rio In Space: Miles and Rio have just finished exploring the space museum and how Rio had wanted to be an astronaut when she was young. Miles sets up a surprise involving Spidey taking them into outer space in the Spider Crawl-R. As Spidey and Rio explore some nearby asteroids, Doc Ock arrives in a tentacled spaceship causing Miles to transform into Spin. Doc Ock in her alias of Space Captain Octopus as she and CAL use the Octorific Space Magnet to capture the Spider Crawl-R as part of her plan to become master of outer space. Rio works with Spidey to get into the ship so that they can reclaim the Spider Crawl-R and defeat Doc Ock.
71	17	"The Goblin and the Geyser"	Greg Johnson	Roxy Beiklik & Nicole Wang	August 16, 2024	319	N/A
71	17	"Skeleton Stomp"	Alexa Harzan	Roxy Beiklik & Nicole Wang	August 16, 2024	319	N/A
The Goblin and the Geyser: Jeff takes Miles, Peter, and Gwen to see Old Dependable, a famous geyser. Later, when Peter, Gwen, and Miles hear people looking at Old Dependable has a hose, they found out that Green Goblin along with his T-Rex put the hose in there and makes his machine shoot water at every place he goes. Team Spidey transforms into dinosaurs and must stop him before sunset. Skeleton Stomp: Team Spidey visits the museum with Mr. Von Carnegie and shows everyone they transform into Dinosaurs and do amazing stunts and tricks. He shows Team Spidey the Silver Skink the lizard. But then Lizard shows up and makes everything in the museum alive with his potions and destroying the museum. He distracts them and steals the Silver Skink. He brings a skeleton to life and destroys the city. So, Team Spidey must stop him before he rules the world.
72	18	"Fool's Gold"	Claudia Silver	Kyle Manske	August 23, 2024	320	N/A
72	18	"The Sundae Save"	Danielle Kreger	Kyle Manske	August 23, 2024	320	N/A
Fool's Gold: Spidey and Spin take White Tiger to their Dino-Web treehouse and show her around. But then a ring-tailed raccoon is spooked by a loud noise in the Lost Gold Nugget Caverns while her family is trapped. They got in there and after they reunited her to her family, they noticed that Rhino and Green Goblin in construction vests are digging to find gold and Gobby invents a blaster to make noise. So, Spidey, Spin, White Tiger and their raccoon friend must stop them before they cause more chaos. The Sundae Save: At the Community Center, Lizzy, Noah, and Charlie show Mr. Kim and Spidey how Sammy the ice cream sundae robot invention. Trapster overhears this and allows herself and her backpack to cause trouble at the intersection by turning stoplights purple. Spidey then tries to stop her by inventing traps. But then Trapster tricks her into her trap with jets but when she tries to make him go into space her invention goes out of control. Then Lizzy, Noah, and Charlie come to the rescue with Sammy by clogging the jets, resulting in Trapster being trapped into her own traps.
73	19	"Adventures in Fossil Hunting"	Greg Johnson	Roxy Beiklik	August 30, 2024	317	N/A
73	19	"Lizard's Buggy Bonanza"	Daka Hermon	Roxy Beiklik	August 30, 2024	317	N/A
Adventures in Fossil Hunting: Mr. Von Carnegie is skyping Team Spidey and they're showing him their dinosaur inventions. The notice he's in Lagarto Island from a cavern. But then the cavern is collapsing, so Team Spidey gets their Spider Crawl-R to Lagarto Island and transform into dinosaurs to rescue him and overcome the obstacles fast before the volcano erupts and gets trapped. Lizard's Buggy Bonanza: At the Bug Fair, Peter, Gwen, and Miles see what regular spiders do. But then Lizard sneaks out there and makes a potion to make all bugs monster sized, including a cricket. It's up to Team Spidey and White Tiger to stop him before he destroys the city.
74	20	"Odd Bot Team Up"	Written by : Alexa Harzan; Story by : Claudia Silver	Roxy Beiklik	September 27, 2024	321	N/A
74	20	"The Lost King"	Greg Johnson	Roxy Beiklik	September 27, 2024	321	N/A
Odd Bot Team Up: Spidey and TRACE-E heard that Doc Ock and CAL are finding gold in the warehouse, but when Spidey tries to warn them not to press the arrow, they along with TRACE-E get trapped. It turns out Trapster set them up. She left Doc Ock a fake treasure map outside her lair reported Spidey the break-in to help Doc Ock and CAL. Doc Ock and Spidey reluctantly team up while TRACE-E and CAL go in pipes to find a way out. In order to get out of Trapster's trap, they and their robots must work together before Trapster leaves them in forever. The Lost King: At the Community Center Spidey and Mrs. Moriyama are playing chess, while Thing makes tea for her. Spidey realizes the rock is the king chess piece then Moriyama tells him that on a ferry this morning, she was playing chess with another passenger when a giant wave knocked it right into a buoy, the king piece flew over the rail and dropped it into the ocean. Spidey and Thing team up to find the chess piece back to her by going to the waterfront and get their diving suits on. Meanwhile, Zola goes to the waterfront to find treasures. He overhears Spidey and Thing's adventure, so he goes underwater to find it as well.
75	21	"The Curse of the Corn Dog King"	Daka Hermon	Kyle Manske & Carrie Mombourquette	October 3, 2024	322	N/A
75	21	"Zola's Halloween Heist"	Written by : Claudia Silver; Story by : Greg Johnson	Kyle Manske & Carrie Mombourquette	October 3, 2024	322	N/A
The Curse of the Corn Dog King: Peter, Gwen, and Miles are at the amusement park at night playing games. Then they noticed a game of the corn dog king, but when they were playing with it, it disappeared, and it has come alive and causes chaos at the amusement park by making corn dogs fly. It turns out the Corn Dog King is a robot, and Green Goblin was controlling the game. So, Team Spidey must stop him before he makes more trouble again. Zola's Halloween Heist: On Halloween, Peter, Gwen, and Miles are done trick or treating, they come into Aunt May's house for a sleepover. However, Zola is executing a plan to control others via their devices and make them bring him Halloween treats. So, Team Spidey must stop him and his Hydra-Bots without falling under the spell.
76	22	"Too Many Zolas"	Peter Gaffney	Kyle Manske	October 11, 2024 (Note: This episode was first released on Disney+ on October 4, 2024.)	318	N/A
76	22	"Electro's Glow Show"	Daka Hermon	Kyle Manske	October 11, 2024	318	N/A
Too Many Zolas: At the park, Zola steals the balloon cart, Team Spidey shows up to stop him, and while they chase the balloons, Zola uses a duplicate ray to duplicate himself to cause trouble around the city. Team Spidey then tricks the Zolas arguing to make them think they're the best. So, Team Spidey and the real Zola must stop them and reverse the duplication. Electro's Glow Show: Peter invites Gwen and Miles to his house to camp in the backyard and look at fireflies. However, they discover that Electro is using robotic fireflies to steal electricity from around the city.
77	23	"Robo-Spideys"	Greg Johnson	Roxy Beiklik	November 1, 2024	323	N/A
77	23	"Saber-Toothed Kitten"	Alexa Harzan	Roxy Beiklik	November 1, 2024	323	N/A
Robo-Spideys: Team Spidey gets an alert that Doc Ock and CAL robbed the jewelry store. CAL drags Doc Ock to the dumpster to wake her up. Doc Ock decides to build Robo-Spideys to be on her side to steal everything. But when they got back to their WEB-Quarters, the bank gets robbed, they found out the robot versions were the ones who did it. And they must stop them before Doc Ock get her revenge. Saber-Toothed Kitten: Peter Gwen, and Miles are in Central Park looking at a statue of a saber-toothed cat. Black Cat hears the surprise while Lizard shows up and turns himself into a saber-toothed cat. Team Spidey shows up to stop him, but when Lizard does his trick, he only gets cat ears. Lizard goes away to fix his potion but then Black Cat chases him without knowing. He goes into his lair and makes a potion. When Black Cat shows up to look at his potions, she knocks it down, causing the potion to turn her into a real saber-toothed cat. So, Team Spidey and Lizard must reverse the potion before she terrorizes the city.
78	24	"Tree House Takeover"	Claudia Silver	Kyle Manske & Carrie Mombourquette	November 8, 2024	324	N/A
78	24	"The Incredible Shrinking Zola"	Daka Hermon	Kyle Manske & Carrie Mombourquette	November 8, 2024	324	N/A
Tree House Takeover: Reptil gives everyone a tour of his tree house along with Spidey and Spin and show off the group's dinosaur powers. However, Rhino, Green Goblin, and Electro ambush the group and steal Spidey, Spin and Reptil's powers, respectively becoming a Triceratops, Velociraptor, and Dilophosaurus. The dinosaur villains go out to the woods and cause trouble as usual. Though Spidey and Spin still have their spider powers, they are insufficient to handle the villains. It's up to them and Reptil to stop them and get their dino powers back before the villains take over the park. The Incredible Shrinking Zola: Aunt May and Peter are at the butterfly garden in the park. May goes to the farmer's market while Peter goes to get a hot dog. Just then, Peter gets an alert that Zola is causing trouble in downtown. He transforms into Spidey. It turns out Zola is using his shrinking device to shrink anything. Spidey webs him up, causing his device to shrink him instead and causing his voice to be high pitched. After Zola frees himself, he goes to the farmer's market to make himself big. Aunt May unknowingly picks him up and take him home. Spidey found him. But he makes a mess in Peter's room and the kitchen and gets back to regular size causing Spidey to shrink in retaliation. It's up to Spidey to stop him and get back to regular size before Zola causes trouble again.
79	25	"Moon Girl and the Dino Dilemma"	Daka Hermon	Kyle Manske & Carrie Mombourquette	November 15, 2024	326	N/A
79	25	"Hulk's Squirrely Switch"	Written by : Claudia Silver; Story by : Alexa Harzan	Kyle Manske & Carrie Mombourquette	November 15, 2024	326	N/A
Moon Girl and the Dino Dilemma: Peter and Miles are going to the hot dog truck when they unexpectedly get an alert. A dinosaur flipped a car over and wrecked a cart with flowers. A new hero named Moon Girl traps them in a bubble with her bubble blaster but realized they were trying to help. Her best friend Devil Dinosaur gets them out of their bubble, but then WEB-STER has found out that there's trouble in the park. It turns out Green Goblin is controlling his mechanical dinosaur is making all the trouble in order to frame Devil Dinosaur. It's up to Spidey, Spin, Moon Girl, and Devil Dinosaur to stop Gobby before he makes a mess in the city. Hulk's Squirrely Switch: Hulk is helping Spidey and Spin are planting trees in the park. But Doc Ock shows up with her superhero swap-o-matic. But when Hulk thunderclaps her, the machine breaks, causing Hulk and a squirrel to switch bodies. Doc Ock captures Squirrel Hulk in a cage. Spin keeps an eye on Hulk while Spidey finds Doc Ock. Squirrel Girl and Tippy-Toe arrive in to help. But Hulk chases Rufus the pet dog. Spidey heads to the boat hangar where Doc Ock is found fixing her invention. She also swaps Spidey's body into a of a pigeon. It's up to Spin, Squirrel Girl, and Tippy-Toe to get them back to normal, before Doc Ock rules the world.
80	26	"A Snow Day for Aunt May"	Greg Johnson	Roxy Beiklik	December 3, 2024	325	N/A
80	26	"Hanukkah Heist"	Written by : Alexa Harzan; Story by : Claudia Silver	Roxy Beiklik	December 3, 2024	325	N/A
A Snow Day for Aunt May: It's Christmas Eve, Aunt May hopes there will be snow to spend it with Peter. But she's sad, so Peter, Gwen, and Miles go to the North Pole and ask Santa Claus to make it snow. But Santa needs help because he lost his sleigh and reindeer in the blizzard, and now they're stranded on a chunk of ice. It's up to Team Spidey and Lockjaw to get them out of the chunks of ice falling from the cave before Christmas morning. Hanukkah Heist: Spidey, Thing, and H.E.R.B.I.E. are decorating the house for Hanukkah and waiting for Aunt Petunia, who is bringing latkes for Hanukkah. Just then Rhino smells the latkes from steals them from her scooter. Spidey and Thing follow Aunt Petunia. Green Goblin chases after the heroes chasing Rhino and Gobby steals the latkes too. Petunia goes on a ride with Gobby on his glider. Doc Ock was about to rob a jewelry store but sees Green Goblin getting the latkes. Petunia chases after Doc Ock in the warehouse and Doc Ock traps Petunia and works on her mish-masher recipe revealer to reveal the secret ingredient. It's up to Spidey and Thing to stop the villains from ruining Hanukkah.
81	27	"Tricky Tricky Trapster"	Alexa Harzan	Roxy Beiklik	January 17, 2025 (Note: This episode was first released on Disney+ on December 4, 2024.)	327	N/A
81	27	"Tractor Beam Trouble"	Greg Johnson	Roxy Beiklik	January 17, 2025	327	N/A
Tricky Tricky Trapster: At the community center, Spidey, Thing, and H.E.R.B.I.E. are putting up a solar panel to get electricity from the sun. Just then, WEB-STER gives them an alert telling them people are trapped in downtown. Spidey and Thing found out that Trapster replaced everything into traps. They even get trapped as well. H.E.R.B.I.E. comes to the rescue but tries to use tools to but failed. H.E.R.B.I.E. traps her by tricking her but got out and her backpack causing them to fight for the remote causing it to land in the garbage truck and H.E.R.B.I.E. destroys her backpack. It's up to him to get Spidey and Thing out of the traps before Trapster catches her remote and causing trouble. Tractor Beam Trouble: Ghosty and Spin arrive at the park to move the Merry-Go-Round, but it's heavy. Spidey comes to the rescue with his new invention Tractor Beam. It pulls heavy things like it weighs nothing at all. Gobby and Rhino see a soccer ball moved by Spidey's Tractor beam. They then distract the heroes with a hot dog knocking a ladder and Gobby and Rhino stole it by causing trouble at every location. It's up to Team Spidey to stop them.
82	28	"The Campout Mystery"	Daka Hermon	Carrie Mombourquette	February 14, 2025	328	N/A
82	28	"Gobby's Metal Menace"	Claudia Silver	Carrie Mombourquette	February 14, 2025	328	N/A
The Campout Mystery: Jeff brings his son Miles and Peter to the campout. Miles brings his book all about Bigfoot who thinks he exists, but his dad doesn't think that. Just then, Trapster hears about Bigfoot and sees Peter and Miles looking for him and she plans to find him first and trap him. The boys look everywhere until they saw broken branches get stepped on Trapster's trap. Bigfoot sets them free and sees every animal get caught in her traps. Peter and Miles transform into Spidey and Spin and find out Trapster is trapping every animal and person, so they won't see Bigfoot. She now traps Bigfoot too. It's up to Spidey and Spin to stop her before she escapes with Bigfoot and her trap truck. Gobby's Metal Menace: Spidey, Spin, and Ghosty help Black Panther donate the vibranium and more stuff to the museum just as the get an alert in downtown from WEB-Ster. All the stop signs and vehicles are chewed off. It turns out Gobby's robot dinosaur is chewing off everything that's metal and using them to create his Gobbybots. It's up to Team Spidey and Black Panther to stop Green Goblin and his bots from stealing the vibranium before he stops the heroes.
83	29	"Dinosaurs on the Loose"	Greg Johnson	Roxy Beiklik	March 14, 2025	329	N/A
83	29	"WEB-STER'S Big Bad Bug"	Written by : Alexa Harzan; Story by : Daka Hermon	Roxy Beiklik	March 14, 2025	329	N/A
Dinosaurs on the Loose: It's Dino Day at the park, Peter, Gwen, and Miles along with everyone are listening to a paleontologist tells them all about dinosaurs. Just then, Green Goblin, Rhino, and Electro plan to cause chaos, and Lizard shows up much to their annoyance, but instantly cheers up when he shows them his Dino-Chango potion which turns them into dinosaurs, and when he does, it makes them speechless (they can't talk, hear anyone, or think like a human). Then, they can't follow Lizard's instructions. Team Spidey teams up with White Tiger and helps the villains while Lizard tries to find a way to calm his nerves. WEB-STER'S Big Bad Bug: Peter, Gwen, and Miles are doing their favorite things in WEB-Quarters, just as they get an alert from WEB-STER. Doc Ock is causing trouble again and fakes emergency calls with help from CAL. He releases the Octo-bug to follow them into WEB-Quarters. The Octo-bug sneaks in and turns WEB-STER evil and traps Team Spidey in and takes control. This makes everything causing trouble. Team Spidey must stop the bug and find it before WEB-STER stays evil forever.
84	30	"Groundhog's Day Out"	Danielle Kreger	Carrie Mombourquette	April 11, 2025 (Note: This episode was first released on Disney+ on April 9, 2025.)	330	N/A
84	30	"Ploofy Power"	Written by : Daka Hermon; Story by : Claudia Silver	Carrie Mombourquette	April 11, 2025	330	N/A
Groundhog's Day Out: Spidey, Ghosty, and White Tiger are at the zoo celebrating Groundhog Day to introduce the Gabe the Groundhog. He'll leave his burrow to eat his favorite treat: sunflower seeds. However, the celebration is interrupted by Green Goblin and Rhino who capture him and hide him to Goblin Island. But Rhino keeps distracting Gobby because he's interested in Gabe. But then Gabe escapes from the cage and goes to the construction site. It's up to Spidey, Ghosty, and White Tiger to bring him back and stop Gobby and Rhino before they steal every transportation to Goblin Island. Ploofy Power: Rio and her kids Miles and Billie are at the mall shopping for things for Billie's birthday. Billie sees something she want for her birthday: Ploofy. Miles meet Gwen and Peter in the back of the line while Rio takes Billie to buy decorations. The toy store owner announced they sold the last Ploofy. The delivery truck is coming back with more Ploofies. Just then, Zola sneaks into the mall and hears about this Ploofy toys and steals the delivery truck. Peter, Gwen, and Miles transform into Team Spidey. Zola drives to the waterfront (where Ant-Man, Wasp, Ghosty, and Spin shrunk Zola back to normal size) and reads all about Ploofy and finds out it speaks to person causing it to play. He then releases his Hydra-Bots to steal all the Ploofies and create a Ploofy hot air blimp to fly up to a unicorn rainbow. Just then, the Empire State Building pokes a hole in the blimp. It's up to Team Spidey to rescue Zola and his Hydra-Bots and to stop them in time just before Billie's birthday.

=== Season 4: Dino-Webs/Water Webs (2025–26) ===
Mitch Stookey is the director for this season.

No. overall	No. in season	Title	Written by	Storyboard by (Note: By episodes 8-13, 15-19 and the rest of the series, the board artists had their credits moved to the end of each episode.)	Original release date	Prod. code	U.S. viewers (millions)
85	1	"Voyage to Spider Island"	Written by : Greg Johnson; Story by : Claudia Silver	Roxy Beiklik & Nicole Wang	June 16, 2025	406	N/A
85	1	"Superhero Soak"	Written by : Alexa Harzan; Story by : Claudia Silver	Roxy Beiklik & Nicole Wang	June 16, 2025	406	N/A
Voyage to Spider Island: At the museum, Team Spidey is helping Mr. Carnegie unpack some of Web-Beard's stuff. They find a map leading to Spider-Island. Overhearing Mr. Carnegie talk about Web-Beard's solid golden statue, Green Goblin follows them to Spider-Island so that he can claim the solid gold statue. As Team Spidey looks for the solid gold statue, they meet Jeff the Land Shark who was drawn on the map as they follow him into Web-Beard's hideaway. With some adjustments to their costumes to resemble pirates, Team Spidey follow Jeff to the solid gold statue. Jeff also plays a hand in helping Team Spidey defeat Green Goblin and rescue the solid gold statue. Superhero Soak: Spidey and Spin help Mr. Kim teach the kids how to make a mural where Spidey had also built a snow cone machine as well as Spin's contribution to Spidey's Power-Paint Blaster. WEB-STER informs Spidey and Spin of trouble on the other side of town. The trouble is caused by Hydro-Man who is soaking everyone. He starts to soak some books as Spidey and Spin arrive. In the nick of time, Captain America arrives to help Spidey and Spin fight Hydro-Man. As they help to track down Hydro-Man, Spidey and Spin make web shields similar to Captain America's shield to help fight Hydro-Man. In addition, they must also find a way to defeat Hydro-Man when he starts to target the mural.
86	2	"Giant-Sized Lizard"	Written by : Greg Johnson; Story by : Claudia Silver	Roxy Beiklik	June 17, 2025	401	N/A
86	2	"Rhino's Wild Bunch"	Alexa Harzan	Roxy Beiklik	June 17, 2025	401	N/A
Giant-Sized Lizard: Iron Man shows Team Spidey his new security system until they saw Lizard hopping in the trash can. He climbs up Stark Tower and has been discovered but falls down due to his suction cups. Lizard creates a potion and makes himself bigger with his super-sized potion and causing more trouble than usual after getting fed up with Team Spidey defeating him all the time. Just as Iron Man shows up due to his alert, he makes himself a giant. Iron Man scans his potion and makes a reversal potion. Ghosty and Spin makes Spidey a giant after Lizard heads to Stark Tower. It's up to Iron Man and Team Spidey to shrink down Lizard back to normal before he destroys the city. Rhino's Wild Bunch: Spidey has fun in the park until a baby elephant named Esther escapes from the zoo. It turns out she wants to play. Just then, White Tiger shows up just in time to get Esther back to the zoo. But she grabs her gem amulet and throws it. Just then, Rhino finds it on the bridge. He touches it causing his eyes to glow and talk to animals. The animals cause trouble around the city. It's up to Spidey and White Tiger to get it back before he rules the world.
87	3	"The Bots vs. Ock"	Written by : Claudia Silver; Story by : Bart Jennett	Carrie Mombourquette	June 18, 2025 (Note: This episode was first released on Disney+ on June 17, 2025.)	402	N/A
87	3	"The Battery Boost"	Danielle Kreger	Carrie Mombourquette	June 18, 2025	402	N/A
The Bots vs. Ock: TRACE-E, TWIST-E, and TWIRL-E want to go on their own mission as Team Spidey consider it a big responsibility. They are given a mission to pick up muffins from the café. After picking up the muffins, the Spider-Bots stumble upon Doc Ock, CAL, and the Octobots raiding an electric store where they steal a specific item and take it to Goblin Island. Having snuck in, the Spider-Bots alert Team Spidey as they show them Doc Ock powering up the lighthouse with the device enabling the lighthouse to turn into a Stomper Bot. Now the Spider-Bots must hold out until Team Spidey arrives so that they can defeat Doc Ock before she can take the Stomper Bot to New York City. The Battery Boost: At the museum, Spidey and Black Panther show off the super-battery to Mr. Von Carnegie as he plans to use it responsibly. Just then, Doc Ock shows up and steals the super-battery in order to power up her most brilliant invention yet. The super-battery then falls off the roof during the fight and lands in Zola's arms. Spidey subdues Doc Ock as Zola uses the super-battery to power himself after putting it into his circuits, causing his screen to turn blue as Spidey and Black Panther pursue him throughout the city. Spidey and Black Panther come up with a plan to make a fake battery to fool Zola. Unfortunately, Doc Ock catches up to them and uses the super-battery to power her Giganto-Bot. When she puts the battery in, it goes out. Then, Zola catches up and kick her Giganto-Bot causing it to fall down. Spidey webs the two villains up and he and Black Panther take the battery back to the museum.
88	4	"King Lizard"	Written by : Greg Johnson; Story by : Bart Jennett	Roxy Beiklik	June 19, 2025	403	N/A
88	4	"Go Rhino Go"	Written by : Alexa Harzan; Story by : Daka Hermon	Roxy Beiklik	June 19, 2025	403	N/A
King Lizard: Team Spidey and Isla Coralton visit Legarto Island to bring new cactus plants for Larry, Lucy, and Lance after they were wiped out on the storm. Also on the island is Lizard who uses his potion to turn Larry, Lucy, and Lance into his loyal reptilian humanoid helpers as he takes on the alias of King Lizard. He makes off Isla's boat and heads to Manhattan where Larry, Lucy, and Lance start serving him. With Lizard planning to turn the other lizards into his servants, Team Spidey must work to defeat Lizard and get the pink iguanas to normal. Go Rhino Go: Spidey and Ghost-Spider arrive at a construction site to help deal with falling bricks and pipes with the Dino Web Crawler due to an issue with the crane. Rhino comes across the scene and steals the Dino Web Crawler while Spidey and Ghost-Spider are tending to the crane. Spidey and Ghost-Spider go after Rhino who has a hard time operating the Dino Web Crawler as he causes damages across Manhattan which Spidey and Ghost-Spider have to tend to. Now Spidey and Ghost-Spider must work to reclaim the Dino Web Crawler and defeat Rhino.
89	5	"Campout Chaos"	Daka Hermon	Carrie Mombourquette	June 20, 2025	404	N/A
89	5	"Panther Pod to the Rescue"	Written by : Claudia Silver; Story by : Greg Johnson	Carrie Mombourquette	June 20, 2025	404	N/A
Campout Chaos: Jeff Morales takes his kids Miles and Billie camping along with Peter and Gwen to have a sleepover at Reptil's treehouse. Reptil shows Billie his powers and goes off to find more fossils. Billie goes into his treehouse and a cave to find a red gem he keeps. Green Goblin and Rhino overhears the gem discovery and plan to steal it while they're asleep. Team Spidey goes into the treehouse but finds Billie in the cave. During the chase, they stole the gem, which broke and causing the villains into dinosaurs and Billie into a T-Rex. It's up to Team Spidey, Reptil, and Billie to stop them before they cause trouble again. Panther Pod to the Rescue: At the Museum, Mr. Von Carnegie meets Miles' grandmother Gloria and finds out the museum has a Wakandan exhibit. Miles turns into Spin and help finish the banner because her purse has everything people need for help. Black Panther shows up and meets Gloria as well. Black Panther, Spin, and Gloria go on a rescue mission to rescue penguins from an avalanche. The Panther Pod gets an emergency alert, they arrive in the desert and found out that Sandman and his sand-nado is causing trouble. Gloria comes to the rescue by taking by giving him a coloring book, but the Panther Pod takes off to Lagarto Island with her. She tries to rescue the iguana, but gets trapped in the river of lava. It's up to Spin and Black Panther to rescue them before the lava rises up.
90	6	"Two Teleporters Too Many"	Greg Johnson	Roxy Beiklik & Nicole Wang	June 27, 2025	405	N/A
90	6	"Dinos Are Forever"	Alexa Harzan	Roxy Beiklik & Nicole Wang	June 27, 2025	405	N/A
Two Teleporters Too Many: Team Spidey and Lockjaw are playing teleport tag. Just then, Green Goblin and Rhino see Lockjaw teleporting into different places around. Green Goblin comes up with a plan to teleport him and Rhino wherever they want with his copy-that-superpower ray. They lead Lockjaw to them with turkey sausages causing his teleportion power to be on Rhino's horn. They go teleporting by touching each other. Team Spidey goes to WEB-Quarters to change Gobby's invention to stop all the trouble. It's up to Team Spidey and Lockjaw stop the villains from teleporting and stealing stuff at every place before the world gets in danger again. Dinos Are Forever: At Reptil's treehouse, Spidey, Spin, and Reptil pull a fossil out of the tar pit just as they get an alert at Lagarto Island from WEB-STER. Green Goblin and Electro tricks them into calling them for help. Gobby's Dino-doom device will turn them into dinosaurs forever. It turns Spidey and Spin into dinosaurs and Electro unexpectedly. Green Goblin leaves the island with the Hover Spinner and make trouble in the city. Spidey and Spin stops Gobbisaurus with a boulder to stop it from gooing it up. Electro spots a boat on the island but leaks after hitting rocks. Spidey and Spin fix Gobby's machine and fly them and Electro where they end up working together to stop Gobby from destroying the city and get back to normal.
91	7	"The Lost Lair of Web-Beard"	Greg Johnson	Roxy Beiklik & Nicole Wang	July 18, 2025	408	N/A
91	7	"Captain Gobby"	Written by : Alexa Harzan; Story by : Claudia Silver	Roxy Beiklik & Nicole Wang	July 18, 2025	408	N/A
The Lost Lair of Web-Beard: Team Spidey visits Mr. Von Carnegie who needs help in the museum, to solve a mystery: Web-Beard's lost lair. It's where Web-Beard keeps everything a secret. Ghosty finds invisible ink on a painting. Team Spidey goes on an adventure to find it. But Doc Ock and CAL follow them to the hideout. Then, Team Spidey found a treasure chest, but just as they open it, the statue of Web-Beard talks due to a recording, they also realized they are booby traps in there. Just then Doc Ock steals the treasure causing the gates to close, which causes Doc Ock and CAL to be trapped in the second door. Web-Beard gives them three tests to get out. After that, they found the key for the keyhole on the floor which makes the two gates open. It's up to Team Spidey to stop Doc Ock and CAL in their submarine and get the treasure to the museum before she stops the heroes. Captain Gobby: Spidey and Ghosty are stopping Green Goblin from causing trouble in the park, just then Captain America stops him with his shield and hits his pumpkin prank to his glider causing it to goo on him instead. Captain America gives Team Spidey his shield to practice while he goes to the community center to help out at the soup kitchen. But Spidey throws it too hard, Green Goblin steals it and tapes it to his pumpkin prank on it. Spidey and Ghosty try to find it but then they realized Gobby is controlling it causing it to fly to him. It's up to Spidey, Ghosty, and Captain America to stop Green Goblin before he ruins the city.
92	8	"Mixing Up Trouble"	Daka Hermon	Anna Bohac, Hideki Yumitani, John Young, Ziqing Sophia Li, David Nguyen, Mehmet Kenan Sinav & Sarah Piironen	August 15, 2025	409	N/A
92	8	"To Catch a Cat"	Written by : Claudia Silver; Story by : Alexa Harzan	Anna Bohac, Hideki Yumitani, John Young, Ziqing Sophia Li, David Nguyen, Mehmet Kenan Sinav & Sarah Piironen	August 15, 2025	409	N/A
Mixing Up Trouble: Peter, Gwen, and Miles are at the community center making Puerto Rician shortbread cookies for the bake sale, but they added too many ingredients because they didn't follow the recipe. Just then WEB-STER tells Team Spidey that Lizard is causing trouble at the park. He listens to a fairy tale story about a dragon. This makes him think he should turn into a real fire breathing dragon. But whenever he sneezes, his potion makes him melt things. But he added more potion, which causes him to get even hotter. It's up to Team Spidey to help Lizard to get him back to normal. To Catch a Cat: Peter and Gwen are at Peter's house and playing the floor is lava, while Aunt May is placing her jewelry box. But Bootsie broke the brooch pin from a jewel. Just then Black Cat follows them, but Rhino steals it before she can. But Rhino steals Bloopy the stuffed animal. It's up to Spidey and Ghost-Spider to stop him before he destroys the city again and stop Black Cat before she keeps the brooch.
93	9	"How to Catch a Caterpillar"	Daka Hermon	Aiken Chau, Cheuk Kei Po, John Young, Mincheul Park, Tim Wu, Ziqing Sophia Li, David Nguyen, Mehmet Kenan Sinav, Sarah Piironen & Abigail Domstad	September 12, 2025 (Note: This episode was released on Disney+ on August 27, 2025.)	411	N/A
93	9	"A Jellyfish Tale"	Claudia Silver	Aiken Chau, Cheuk Kei Po, John Young, Mincheul Park, Tim Wu, Ziqing Sophia Li, David Nguyen, Mehmet Kenan Sinav, Sarah Piironen & Abigail Domstad	September 12, 2025	411	N/A
How to Catch a Caterpillar: At the community center, Team Spidey surprises the kids with three chrysalises about how caterpillars turn into butterflies. Just then, Rhino hears the commotion, thinking the chrysalises are jewels he can steal. He crashes into the community center and opens the gate and steals it. Team Spidey founds out that Rhino stole them. He runs around the city and passes by Zola reading a newspaper so nobody will notice he's there. But this causes Zola to hear Rhino talking about the jewels and chases him. As Team Spidey catches Rhino, they found out that Zola stole them as well. Zola releases his Hydra-Bots to stop the heroes. Rhino then chases after them. It's up to Team Spidey to save the chrysalises and stop the two baddies before the butterflies hatch. A Jellyfish Tale: Team Spidey goes underwater in their submarine vehicles and look at coral reefs. Just then, Isla Coralton calls them that a strange disturbance in the ocean trench home to the jellyfish. They go to the cavern and find out that all the jellyfish are startled by the shaking. It turns out, Doc Ock and her submarine-bots drilling inside the cavern to find gems. It's up to Team Spidey to rescue the jellyfish and stop Doc Ock before it's too late again.
94	10	"Night of the Goblins"	Written by : Greg Johnson; Story by : Daka Hermon	Cheuk Po, Irene Huang, Daniela Smith-Fischer, Toren Atkinson, W. Travis Johnson, Sophia Ziqing Li, David Nguyen, Mehmet Kenan Sinav, Sarah Piironen & Abigail Domstad	October 2, 2025	410	N/A
94	10	"Bat Attitude"	Alexa Harzan	Cheuk Po, Irene Huang, Daniela Smith-Fischer, Toren Atkinson, W. Travis Johnson, Sophia Ziqing Li, David Nguyen, Mehmet Kenan Sinav, Sarah Piironen & Abigail Domstad	October 2, 2025	410	N/A
Night of the Goblins: It's Halloween and Aunt May is helping out at the Block Party. Peter, Gwen, and Miles are dressed up as aliens and go Trick-or-Treating. But Green Goblin is causing trouble by throwing his pumpkin goo. As they web him up, he gets an idea to make a team of his own. He uses his Copy-Me-Scanner to make two clones of him to cause more trouble than usual. Spidey gets Ghosty and Spin to dress up as the baddie. It's up to Team Spidey stop him and his yellow and blue clones from ruining the Block Party before he ruins Halloween again. Bat Attitude: Jeff takes his son Miles and his friends Peter and Gwen on a nighttime hike and learn about bats and more nocturnal animals. Just then, Doc Ock shows up and tries her invention called the Octo-Bat Beam to make all the bats at the bat house to do what she says by stealing everyone's stuff and loads them into her vehicle. Team Spidey finds out what Doc Ock is up to. She plans to use the bats in order to take over New York City as the Queen of the Night. It's up to Team Spidey to defeat Doc Ock and free the bats from her mind control.
95	11	"Saving Spider Island"	Greg Johnson	Abigal Domstad, Anna Bohac, Becky Wedel, Hideki Yumitani, John Young, Mincheul Park, Toren Atkinson, W. Travis Johnson, Sophia Ziqing Li, David Nguyen, Mehmet Kenan Sinav, & Sarah Piironen	November 7, 2025	412	N/A
95	11	"A Ribbiting Rescue"	Alexa Harzan	Abigal Domstad, Anna Bohac, Becky Wedel, Hideki Yumitani, John Young, Mincheul Park, Toren Atkinson, W. Travis Johnson, Sophia Ziqing Li, David Nguyen, Mehmet Kenan Sinav, & Sarah Piironen	November 7, 2025	412	N/A
Saving Spider Island: Spidey is hanging out with Jeff the Land Shark on his pirate ship. But while Spidey takes Jeff home to Spider Island, the ship gets stopped by Doc Ock's underwater tentacles. It turns out she and Green Goblin take over the island calling it Villain Island. It's up to the heroes to stop the villains before they take over the island while Jeff learns to slow down and think things through. A Ribbiting Rescue: Peter and Gwen are outside his house watering the flowers while Miles shows up late because he's taking care of his new pet frog named Hippity Hopper. But he hops into a truck while chasing a butterfly. They transform into Team Spidey to look for him. As soon as Spin tries to grab him, he distracts Rhino robbing a bank again and Lizard ruining his potion to turn into an eagle for a while and gets inside Zola's robot body, so he makes the frog his boss. But this causes Hippity Hopper to tickle Zola and his hopping is causing him to jump on his circuits and making him dance. He eventually gets out and they web up Zola. The three baddies get so angry that the frog ruined their schemes. As soon as Team Spidey finally catches him, Rhino and Lizard steals Hippity and go into Lizard's lab and turn themselves into frogs. It's up to the heroes to stop the two baddies (excluding Zola) before things get worse again.
96	12	"A Squirrel Girl and Tippy Toe Pirate Adventure"	Written by : Claudia Silver; Story by : Becca Topol	Abigail Domstad, Becky Wedel, Cheuk Po, Daniela Smith-Fischer, Irene Haung, Nicole Wang, W. Travis Johnson, Sophia Ziqing Li, David Nguyen, Mehmet Kenan Sinav, & Sarah Piironen	November 14, 2025	413	N/A
96	12	"Knight at the Museum"	Daka Hermon	Abigail Domstad, Becky Wedel, Cheuk Po, Daniela Smith-Fischer, Irene Haung, Nicole Wang, W. Travis Johnson, Sophia Ziqing Li, David Nguyen, Mehmet Kenan Sinav, & Sarah Piironen	November 14, 2025	413	N/A
A Squirrel Girl and Tippy Toe Pirate Adventure: Spidey gives Squirrel Girl and Tippy Toe a tour of Spidey Island and they meet Jeff the land Shark. Tippy Toe and Jeff quickly become best friends and play on the ship while Squirrel Girl goes on a tour with Spidey. While they're gone, Green Goblin and Rhino came on the island and steal the ship with Tippy Toe and Jeff on board. Their plan is to take the ship to Goblin Island. During the confrontation, the two animals fight Rhino causing him to break the steering wheel. It's up to those heroes to stop the two villains from keeping the ship before they defeat the heroes for the first time ever. Knight at the Museum: Gwen, Miles, Peter, and his aunt May are at the museum for a sleepover. Mr. Von Carnegie shows up in the medieval suit for a new exhibit full of legendary knights and tells them a story about Sir Galabad using his sword to cause trouble. As they prepare for a sleepover tour, the museum is haunted by the ghost of Sir Galabad. The kids transform into Team Spidey and find out what's going on. Sir Galabad traps Aunt May and Mr. Von Carnegie inside the vault of valuable museum stuff. As Team Spidey follows Sir Galabad in the city, he makes things float with his magical sword and armor. They found out it was Green Goblin using Sir Galabad's power from the museum to cause trouble in the city. It's up to Team Spidey to stop Green Goblin before he rules the world.
97	13	"The Greedy Goose"	Becca Topol & Alexa Harzan	Abigal Domstad, Anna Bohac, Becky Wedel, Cheuk Po, Hideki Yumitani, John Young, Mincheul Park, Tim Wu, Sophia Ziqing Li, David Nguyen, Mehmet Kenan Sinav, & Sarah Piironen	November 21, 2025	414	N/A
97	13	"Playpen Pandemonium"	Greg Johnson	Abigal Domstad, Anna Bohac, Becky Wedel, Cheuk Po, Hideki Yumitani, John Young, Mincheul Park, Tim Wu, Sophia Ziqing Li, David Nguyen, Mehmet Kenan Sinav, & Sarah Piironen	November 21, 2025	414	N/A
The Greedy Goose: Team Spidey are at the community center cooking food to celebrate Family Feast Day when all of a sudden, a giant goose is outside, and it turns out Green Goblin brought it to the community center. His greedy goose sucks up the food from its mouth, and he goes out in the city to suck up more food from the people. But then the pies got on the windshield which causes the goose to go haywire. It's up to Team Spidey to stop him and his goose before the guests come to celebration at the community center. Playpen Pandemonium: There's a new playpen for toddlers at the community center. Mr. Kim ordered the seesaw which is too big for toddlers to play on. Spidey orders Ant-Man to come to the rescue by using his gauntlet and shrink disk. But Rhino and Doc Ock spy on them and she thinks she can use Ant-Man's gauntlet to shrink everything so she can steal everything. Rhino distracts the heroes to watch him to show his talents. Doc Ock sneaks up and tries to steal the gauntlet which causes them to fight and the gauntlet breaks. But Rhino breaks Spidey's webs and causes Ant-Man's other gauntlet to shrink them and Doc Ock down. It's up to Spidey and Ant-Man to get to the other gauntlet at the slide and get big again before the baddies steal it to cause trouble again.
98	14	"The Candlelight Christmas Walk"	Written by : Daka Hermon; Story by : Greg Johnson	Carrie Mombourquette	December 1, 2025 (Note: This episode was released on Disney+ on November 26, 2025.)	407	N/A
98	14	"The Santa Trap"	Written by : Claudia Silver; Story by : Daka Hermon	Carrie Mombourquette	December 1, 2025	407	N/A
The Candlelight Christmas Walk: It's the candlelight walk in New York. Every year the mayor chooses a person to carry a holiday candle through the streets of the city and the person choose volunteers all over the city. And the winner is Miles' father Jeff. But Green Goblin, Rhino, and Hydro-Man see all the people celebrating and plan to ruin the candlelight walk on their own. Peter, Gwen, and Miles plan to meet his father Jeff at the park where the Christmas tree is, but Rhino is behind them, and they suit up as Team Spidey. Rhino plans to blow out the candle, Green Goblin plans to blow it out with a fan on his glider, and Hydro-Man blasts water to wet the candle. It's up to Team Spidey to stop those baddies before they ruin Christmas. The Santa Trap: The Morales family are decorating their house for Christmas so Santa can come to their place. WEB-STER alerts Team Spidey that Santa is in trouble who was last seen on a rooftop. They found his sleigh and reindeer, but they fell into a trap. It turns out Trapster trapped them, Santa, and the presents. And she planned a whole lot of Christmas traps. It's up to Team Spidey to save Santa before Christmas and teach Trapster the true meaning of Christmas.
99	15	"The Treasure of Billie the Pirate"	Written by : Claudia Silver; Story by : Greg Johnson	Aiken Chau, Becky Wedel, Daniela Smith-Fischer, Hideki Yumitani, Irene Huang, Nicole Wang, Toren Atkinson, Sophia Ziqing Li, David Nguyen, Mehmet Kenan Sinav & Sarah Piironen	January 2, 2026	415	N/A
99	15	"Big City, Little Land Shark"	Daka Hermon	Aiken Chau, Becky Wedel, Daniela Smith-Fischer, Hideki Yumitani, Irene Huang, Nicole Wang, Toren Atkinson, Sophia Ziqing Li, David Nguyen, Mehmet Kenan Sinav & Sarah Piironen	January 2, 2026	415	N/A
The Treasure of Billie the Pirate: Peter is in the park with Rio and her kids Miles and Billie. Billie is pretending to be a pirate and she puts everything inside her treasure chest including a golden acorn and locks it with a key. But Black Cat sneaks in and steals it. Peter and Miles saw her and transform into Team Spidey. Black Cat tries to open the chest with a twig from a bird's nest, but it broke. Then Rhino stole it from her as soon as Team Spidey webs her up. And he and Gobby get away on their pirate ship and Team Spidey gets on their Webs Ahoy pirate ship. Shortly after Spidey and Spin stop them, Doc Ock and CAL in their submarine show up and take it as well. It's up to Spidey and Spin to stop Doc Ock before she keeps it forever. Big City, Little Land Shark: Spidey, Ghost Spider, and Spin take Jeff the Land Shark to tour around New York City, but people see him as a scary shark until Team Spidey made people realize he's a cute shark. As soon as they continue to tour the city, he wanders around, and Team Spidey lost track of him. In Central Park, Zola sees Jeff scaring people and thinks he should help him steal stuff. As soon as Jeff reaches for the hot dog, Zola releases the cage from his robot body it causes him to be trapped and takes him to the waterfront in his lair. The jewelry woman and hot dog vender told Team Spidey that Zola captured Jeff. In his lair, Zola teaches Jeff how to get trained. It's up to Team Spidey rescue Jeff before Zola keeps him as his pet.
100	16	"A Helping Handful"	Alexa Harzan & Bart Jennett	Anna Bohac, Hideki Yumitani, John Young, Mincheul Park, Nicole Wang, W. Travis Johnson, Sophia Ziqing Li, David Nguyen, Mehmet Kenan Sinav, & Sarah Piironen	January 9, 2026	416	N/A
100	16	"Adventures Down the Drain"	Greg Johnson	Anna Bohac, Hideki Yumitani, John Young, Mincheul Park, Nicole Wang, W. Travis Johnson, Sophia Ziqing Li, David Nguyen, Mehmet Kenan Sinav, & Sarah Piironen	January 9, 2026	416	N/A
A Helping Handful: Spidey and Thing are building a new tool shed at the community center while H.E.R.B.I.E. puts on the roof. When H.E.R.B.I.E. goes to get the paint, he crashes very hard, causing his wires to come loose and starts acting strange. He goes haywire all over the city. He goes to the farmers' market to help Spidey's aunt May long shopping list, then Rhino grabs him and agrees to help him steal stuff. Spidey and Thing start chasing after them, but H.E.R.B.I.E. is too busy helping Rhino cause trouble and they land on a ship. It's up to Spidey and Thing to stop Rhino and fix H.E.R.B.I.E.'s wires. Adventures Down the Drain: Team Spidey are web swinging together in the city just as WEB-STER alerts them that Lizard is sneaking around the farmers' market. He sneaks in and steals things for his shrink potion recipe. It turns out, he uses it to steal everything. Team Spidey shows up and chases him. As soon as Spidey catches Lizard, his shrink potion flies up and shrinks them down to tiny size. Then a skateboarder splashes a puddle on them, which causes them to go down the sewers. Ghosty and Spin take the potion to WEB-Quarters and make a reversal potion. Spidey goes to the blue pipe to rescue Lizard, but when he tries to call Ghosty and Spin, his comm-link broke due to the slip and sliding. It's up to Spidey and Lizard to get back on land and get back to regular size. But Lizard also has to learn to work together with Spidey.
101	17	"Dolphin Rescue"	Claudia Silver	Becky Wedel, Cheuk Po, Daniela Smith-Fischer, Hideki Yumitani, Irene Huang, Nicole Wang, Tim Wu, Sophia Ziqing Li, David Nguyen, Mehmet Kenan Sinav, & Sarah Piironen	January 16, 2026 (Note: This episode was first released on Disney+ on January 10, 2026.)	417	N/A
101	17	"Gobby's Trash Day Takeover"	Daka Hermon	Becky Wedel, Cheuk Po, Daniela Smith-Fischer, Hideki Yumitani, Irene Huang, Nicole Wang, Tim Wu, Sophia Ziqing Li, David Nguyen, Mehmet Kenan Sinav, & Sarah Piironen	January 16, 2026	417	N/A
Dolphin Rescue: Team Spidey is having a good time going underwater in their vehicles until a baby dolphin comes by asking for their help. When they arrived at the trench, the baby dolphin's parents are acting weird and wearing dolphins-obey-me helmets and grabbing treasures in their mouths. It turns out, they're bringing Doc Ock the treasures inside a hidden cavern. It's up to Team Spidey and the baby dolphin to stop her and rescue the dolphin parents before she keeps the treasures forever as usual. Gobby's Trash Day Takeover: It's Earth Day. Peter, his aunt May, Gwen, and Miles are at the beach cleaning up trash and helping the environment. As soon as the beach is finally cleaned up and while aunt May gets ice cream for the kids, more trash comes to the beach. It turns out Green Goblin on his pirate ship is using his trash cannon to turn Earth Day into Garbage Day. The kids suit up as Team Spidey. The kids come up with a plan by using the surfers' surfboards by putting the web flags on them as boats. As they get to his ship, he traps them by activating closing doors by squishing them. It's up to Team Spidey to stop Gobby before he covers the whole city with trash and teach Gobby to help the environment.
102	18	"Motorcycle Madness"	Greg Johnson	Aiken Chau, Becky Wedel, Cheuk Po, Hideki Yumitani, John Young, Mincheul Park, Tim Wu, W. Travis Johnson, Sophia Ziqing Li, David Nguyen, Mehmet Kenan Sinav, & Sarah Piironen	April 3, 2026	418	N/A
102	18	"Oops! I Shrank WEB-Quarters"	Written by : Alexa Harzan & Sib Ventress; Story by : Claudia Silver	Aiken Chau, Becky Wedel, Cheuk Po, Hideki Yumitani, John Young, Mincheul Park, Tim Wu, W. Travis Johnson, Sophia Ziqing Li, David Nguyen, Mehmet Kenan Sinav, & Sarah Piironen	April 3, 2026	418	N/A
Motorcycle Madness: Spidey and Ghost-Spider are swinging by around the city. Until a cat knocks a garbage can which causes a truck filled with barrels to roll around the city including a cafe. Luckily, Captain America on his motorcycle arrives in time to help them. Captain America tells Spidey and Ghosty he's added new surprises. Just then, they found out one of the barrels broke part of his bike. They go to WEB-Quarters to fix his motorcycle while he helps the truck driver put the barrels back on the truck. Spidey and Ghosty fixed the motorcycle and test drive it. Zola sees them and he distracts them by helping a window washer. Zola then steals Captain America's motorcycle and drives all around the city presses new buttons. As soon as he stops at the movie theater, he sees a poster that a new movie call "Motorcycle Baddies" is coming soon. It gives him an idea to dress up as a motorcycle baddie. He puts on motorcycle costume and starts joyriding. It's up to the heroes to stop Zola before he causes mayhem. Oops! I Shrank WEB-Quarters: At WEB-Quarters, Gwen is rocking out with her drums causing Peter and Miles to rock out. She then gives Peter drum lessons until he gets the hang of it. WEB-STER alerts them that Doc Ock is causing trouble. It turns out she shrinks everything down to size with her resizer-izer ray. As they arrive to stop her, her invention breaks which causes the wires to come loose after it hits the ground. As soon they got back to WEB-Quarters, Spidey gets his pliers from his bedroom while Ghosty and Spin fix Doc Ock's resizer-izer. When they get inside, Doc Ock's invention goes haywire which causes WEB-Quarters to shrink down to the size of a ball. It starts to roll around everywhere in the city. Doc Ock overhears this, which gives her a plan to steal all of Team Spidey's stuff. Every time the resizer-izer goes haywire, WEB-Quarters it keeps shrinking which gives people to use it for other stuff. It's up to Spidey to save WEB-Quarters and his friends before Doc Ock and CAL keep it forever.
103	19	"The Return of Web-Beard"	Written by : Claudia Silver; Story by : Greg Johnson	Aiken Chau, Becky Wedel, Cheuk Po, Irene Huang, Nicole Wang, Toren Atkinson, W. Travis Johnson, Sophia, Ziqing Li, David Nguyen, Mehmet Kenan Sinav, & Sarah Piironen	May 1, 2026	419	N/A
103	19	"Sandman vs Hydro-Man"	Written by : Daka Hermon; Story by : Greg Johnson	Aiken Chau, Becky Wedel, Cheuk Po, Irene Huang, Nicole Wang, Toren Atkinson, W. Travis Johnson, Sophia, Ziqing Li, David Nguyen, Mehmet Kenan Sinav, & Sarah Piironen	May 1, 2026	419	N/A
The Return of Web-Beard: Mr. Von Carnegie presents Team Spidey to the museum's brand-new Web-Beard exhibit. Jeff the Land Shark arrives to the museum just in time to look at the exhibit and Web-Beard paintings of them. But he misses his friend Web-Beard because he disappeared many, many, years ago. Mr. Von Carnegie finds a jewel in a crate of pirate artifacts. Ghost-Spider finds Web-Beard wearing a medallion and Spidey puts it on the statue. When it happened, it causes Web-Beard to be alive and become real. Jeff is so happy that he came back to life again. The medallion turns out to be a golden curse. Then Mr. Von Carnegie puts the medallion back safely. Unfortunately, Rhino and Green Goblin show up to steal museum stuff. As soon as everyone sees them, Jeff jumps on Rhino causing the medallion to fall and the jewel falls off which causes Jeff to turn into a statue. Green Goblin and Rhino escape with Jeff on Green Goblin's pirate ship. It's up to Team Spidey and Web-Beard to stop the baddies and get Jeff back so they can reverse the spell. Sandman vs Hydro-Man: Peter, Gwen, and Miles go to the beach to build a sandcastle. But Sandman shows up and builds a sandcastle too. Just then, Hydro-Man shows up as well to enjoy his day at the beach. The villains then argue over the beach, which causes Peter, Gwen, and Miles to hear them. They suit up as Team Spidey. Sandman and Hydro-Man make this into a contest about whoever causes the most trouble. Whenever Team Spidey catches them, they keep disappearing to every different place to start the contest. It's up to Team Spidey to stop those baddies made of sand and water before they destroy New York. Spidey tricks them into getting together to make it a big mess which causes to Sandman to be soaked and Hydro-Man be covered in sand. They both agree to share the beach and play nicely after getting washed. As soon as Peter, Gwen, and Miles finish building their sandcastle, Sandman and Hydro-Man get into another argument about what their sandcastle needs more stuff. Then the kids suit up as Team Spidey again to settle the issue as the episode ends.

=== Season 5: Rescue-Webs (2026) ===
Darren Bachynski & Mitch Stookey are the directors for this season.

No. overall	No. in season	Title	Written by	Storyboarded by	Original release date	Prod. code	U.S. viewers (millions)
104	1	"Lights, Sirens, Action"	Written by : Daka Hermon; Story by : Sib Ventress	Abigail Domstad, Aiken Chau, Anita Vu, Anna Bohac, Becky Wedel, Bora Moon, Cheuk Po, Clint Morris, Daniela Smith-Fischer, Hideki Yumitani, Irene Huang, John Young, Jouchelle Miranda, Mincheul Park, Peter MacAdams, Sarah Piironen, Selena Marchetti, Tamlyn Kunimoto, Tim Wu, Toren Atkinson, W. Travis Johnson, Sophia Ziqing Li, David Nguyen, Mehmet Kenan Sinav, & Nicole Wang	July 13, 2026	TBA	N/A
104	1	"Symbie's Slimy Scheme"	Claudia Silver	Abigail Domstad, Aiken Chau, Anita Vu, Anna Bohac, Becky Wedel, Bora Moon, Cheuk Po, Clint Morris, Daniela Smith-Fischer, Hideki Yumitani, Irene Huang, John Young, Jouchelle Miranda, Mincheul Park, Peter MacAdams, Sarah Piironen, Selena Marchetti, Tamlyn Kunimoto, Tim Wu, Toren Atkinson, W. Travis Johnson, Sophia Ziqing Li, David Nguyen, Mehmet Kenan Sinav, & Nicole Wang	July 13, 2026	TBA	N/A
Lights, Sirens, Action: Peter looks at WEB-STER's screen and saw everything is nice and quiet in the city until WEB-STER alerts them that an apartment is on fire. Team Spidey suits and gear up and takes their Rescue-Webs firetruck. Then, Zola investigates Team Spidey in their firetruck to rescue people. This gives him an idea to rescue people and put out fires as he turns into emergency rescue Zola to get people's attention. He then goes to the park to put out smoking objects. Just then, Team Spidey spots the skateboarder and rescue her just as they found out Zola trying to help people with fake rescues without them being in danger. As they web him up, he steals their firetruck to help people out. It's up to Team Spidey to stop him before he causes even more trouble again. Symbie's Slimy Scheme: Team Spidey are cleaning their firetruck at WEB-Quarters. But TRACE-E helps them to test out the water cannon inside. Just then WEB-STER alerts them that there's a disturbance in the water pipes downtown. A man was washing his car but instead of water, purple slime came out of the hose, and the water fountain, the street, and the fire hydrant. They found that the giggling is coming from Symbie. He's spraying his purple slime everywhere he goes. TRACE-E brings the firetruck to clean the places Symbie caused. He also hides and transforms into different shapes. He also heads to the library to make another mess. Ghosty and Spin go down the manhole but slip on slime. They are in Symbie's lair, and it turns out he's he fills up the water tank with his purple slime, pressing button and lever to send through pipes in to the city. When he presses the big red button the gauge will reach to the top, the whole city will be replaced with slime instead of water. It's up to Spidey and TRACE-E to help Ghosty and Spin to stop Symbie before the slime reaches the playground or the whole city will be covered in slime through pipes and drains.
105	2	"One Fantastic Surprise Party"	Sib Ventress	Abigail Domstad, Becky Wedel, Cheuk Po, Clint Morris, Daniela Smith-Fischer, Hideki Yumitani, Irene Huang, Sarah Piironen, Toren Atkinson, Sophia Ziqing Li, David Nguyen, Mehmet Kenan Sinav, & Nicole Wang	July 13, 2026	TBA	N/A
105	2	"Kitty Cat Chaos"	Danielle Kreger	Abigail Domstad, Becky Wedel, Cheuk Po, Clint Morris, Daniela Smith-Fischer, Hideki Yumitani, Irene Huang, Sarah Piironen, Toren Atkinson, Sophia Ziqing Li, David Nguyen, Mehmet Kenan Sinav, & Nicole Wang	July 13, 2026	TBA	N/A
One Fantastic Surprise Party: Spidey and Mr. Fantastic just got out of the Space Museum when Rufus the dog is causing trouble. Mr. Fantastic catches the dog, balloon, and football all at the same time. His superpowers make his body parts stretch to reach from far away. Ghosty, Spin, and Thing are at the community center getting ready for Mr. Fantastic's birthday party. After he finishes drinking water from the fountain, he gets the hiccups! Which makes his body turn into bunch of shapes and gets back to normal when he hiccups the second time. When Spidey and Mr. Fantastic are going to the community center, Green Goblin starts goo-ing rollerbladers and Rhino robs the bank again. By the time they stop them, his hiccups are getting out of control. It's up to them to reach the community center before Mr. Fantastic. has the hiccups forever. When they finally got to the community center, his hiccups are finally gone. Kitty Cat Chaos: Peter and Miles are at the park playing football and doing tricks, when all of a sudden Lizard shows up to try out his Kitty cat potion. He spritzes it on Mr. Kielbasa to he can take his hot dog cart away and turns a man with a cowboy hat into a kitten. As Peter and Miles were trying to find the football, they see Mr. Kielbasa as a kitten, so they turn into Team Spidey to investigate. They found him and a man with a cowboy hat as kittens. They found out that Lizard is behind all this. As they tried to stop him, his potion drops on the sidewalk which causes Spidey and Spin to turn into kittens. When set out to go find Lizard, they get an alert that Rhino robbed the bank again and Black Cat robbed the jewelry store again. They stop Rhino by pouncing on him, and tell Black Cat to return the stolen jewelry. They finally got down to Lizard's lair and it turns out he makes a potion so big to turn the whole city into kittens. It's up to Spidey and Spin to him before he gets his revenge again.
106	3	"Remote Controlled Zola"	Written by : Daka Hermon; Story by : Harrison Wilcox	Anna Bohac, Becky Wedel, Clint Morris, Hideki Yumitani, John Young, Mincheul Park, W. Travis Johnson, Sophia Ziqing Li, David Nguyen, Mehmet Kenan Sinav, & Nicole Wang	July 13, 2026	TBA	N/A
106	3	"Super Cat"	Greg Johnson	Anna Bohac, Becky Wedel, Clint Morris, Hideki Yumitani, John Young, Mincheul Park, W. Travis Johnson, Sophia Ziqing Li, David Nguyen, Mehmet Kenan Sinav, & Nicole Wang	July 13, 2026	TBA	N/A
Remote Controlled Zola: Peter, Gwen, and Miles are at the park where Peter is controlling his new toy robot to do cool moves. Green Goblin shows up to steal something expensive. But Rhino wants to steal toys instead. This angers Gobby. Rhino snatches the toy robot causing the kids to turn into Team Spidey. After stopping Rhino, Gobby gets fed up with Rhino for not doing whatever he says. When Gobby sees Zola who's going to steal, he gets an idea to control him and steal whatever he wants. He gets his Zola controller antenna, puts in on his head and causes him to be his partner. This also causes Gobby's face to be on Zola's screen and he starts naming him Gobzola. When Team Spidey came back to WEB-Quarters to relax, WEB-STER gives them an alert, tell them that Zola is stealing things in the city. They found out that Zola sounds a lot like Green Goblin which means Gobby is controlling Zola. When Rhino got out of Team Spidey's webs, he gets upset when Zola is Gobby's new partner in crime. Then Rhino steals the remote control and glider for revenge which causes him to control Zola calling him Rhinozola. Then they cause Rhino to drop the remote control causing it to break and Zola out of control. It's up to Team Spidey to stop the three baddies and get Zola back to normal before it's robot madness. Super Cat: Spin and Ghost Spider are meeting Mr. Fantastic at the museum. It turns out he's finished making his super fantastic power belt so he can help people more than ever. Ghost Spider puts on his belt and move a really heavy statue causing her to be strong. When Spidey also puts it on, he jumps high into the air, and it has flying powers. Across the street, Black Cat is getting ready for the tea party with her stuffed animal Bloopy. She snatches Mr. Fantastic's new belt and tries it on to be strong, sparkly, and fly to go to every store to rob sparkly things. The heroes go to Mr. Fantastic's time out force field in the space museum where he invented a device that can create a bubble to give villains a time out. It's up to the heroes to stop her before she destroys the city.
107	4	"Sandman's Mountain Mayhem"	Claudia Silver	Bora Moon, Cheuk Po, Clint Morris, Daniela Smith-Fischer, Sarah Piironen, Toren Atkinson, W. Travis Johnson, Sophia Ziqing Li, David Nguyen, Mehmet Kenan Sinav, & Nicole Wang	July 13, 2026	TBA	N/A
107	4	"Pufferfish Problems"	Written by : Sib Ventress; Story by : Danielle Kreger	Bora Moon, Cheuk Po, Clint Morris, Daniela Smith-Fischer, Sarah Piironen, Toren Atkinson, W. Travis Johnson, Sophia Ziqing Li, David Nguyen, Mehmet Kenan Sinav, & Nicole Wang	July 13, 2026	TBA	N/A
Sandman's Mountain Mayhem: Jeff Morales and his son Miles to Pointy Peak Mountain to hike all the way up to the top. Along the way, they saw prairie dogs eating dandelions. But Sandman shows up to carve his face on top of the mountain which causes rocks to fall down. Miles suits up as Spin to help out. Spin tries to web him up but he stops him. He calls Spidey and Ghost Spider to help him after WEB-STER gives them an alert. Spidey brings his rescue copter while Ghosty brings his Spin cycle. As they get up to the mountain, Sandman's sculpture starts to fall apart thanks to his sandblasting. it's up to Team Spidey to rescue people before Sandman takes over the mountain forever. Pufferfish Problems: Spidey takes Rocket Raccoon and Groot to the aquarium for the first time ever, but Groot gets too excited to see all the sea creatures especially the pufferfish. Their day at the aquarium gets ruined when Spidey's Spidey Sense tingles him to alert that Lizard showed up to take a pufferfish to make a puffer potion to make himself to puff up. It's up to the heroes to stop Lizard and get the pufferfish back before he takes over the whole city. But first Rocket Raccoon has to learn Groot can do things by himself and Groot has to learn to stop rushing things in.
108	5	"Aunt May's Flying House"	Greg Johnson	Aiken Chau, Bora Moon, Daniela Smith-Fischer, Hideki Yumitani, Irene Huang, Sarah Piironen, Toren Atkinson, W. Travis Johnson, Sophia Ziqing Li, David Nguyen, & Mehmet Kenan Sinav	July 13, 2026	TBA	N/A
108	5	"Spiders vs Flies!"	Written by : Claudia Silver; Story by : Danielle Kreger	Aiken Chau, Bora Moon, Daniela Smith-Fischer, Hideki Yumitani, Irene Huang, Sarah Piironen, Toren Atkinson, W. Travis Johnson, Sophia Ziqing Li, David Nguyen, & Mehmet Kenan Sinav	July 13, 2026	TBA	N/A
Aunt May's Flying House: Spidey and Spin's nice and quiet city get interrupted by Doc Ock's invention octo-floater to rob jewelry. As they stop her and take her invention to WEB-Quarters, WEB-STER alerts Spidey that his aunt May is looking for him. It's Chore Day. Peter and Miles show up just in time to clean up his room. When his aunt May go to the market and Peter helps Miles are finish cleaning up his room. Bootsie touches the octo-floater, to cause his house to float around the city. When Doc Ock sees the house, she gets her octo-jets to follow them. As soon as she reaches the house, she gets inside his house to get her octo-floater back leaving Spidey and Spin stranded in the ocean. It's up to Spidey and Spin to stop Doc Ock before she can take over the city again especially Aunt May gets upset. Spiders vs Flies!: Peter, Gwen, and Miles are playing frisbee in the park, until they saw a regular spider making webs and protect a fly. Just then, they saw a gigantic fly causing trouble for the two people are trying to have a picnic. They then suit up as Team Spidey and find out that it's a robofly. This can mean only one thing, a lady villain named... Swarm (from Iron Man and His Awesome Friends)! They also found out that she is the one who made the robo-fly with her Zzepter. WEB-STER alerts Team Spidey that she is making her robo-flies cause trouble around for people and the whole city. It's up to Team Spidey to stop her before she rules the whole city.
109	6	"Mighty May!"	Sib Ventress	Anna Bohac, Bora Moon, Hideki Yumitani, John Young, Mincheul Park, Peter MacAdams, W. Travis Johnson, Sophia Ziqing Li, David Nguyen, Mehmet Kenan Snav, & Nicole Wang	August 7, 2026	TBA	N/A
109	6	"Electro Overload"	Written by : Danielle Kreger; Story by : Greg Johnson	Anna Bohac, Bora Moon, Hideki Yumitani, John Young, Mincheul Park, Peter MacAdams, W. Travis Johnson, Sophia Ziqing Li, David Nguyen, Mehmet Kenan Snav, & Nicole Wang	August 7, 2026	TBA	N/A
Mighty May!: Peter and his aunt May are playing catch, but her favorite jacket gets torn when she bumped into the fence, so he's goes to Mr. Fantastic's lab at the space museum to help him fix it. He introduces Spidey to his new invention Fantastic Fix-o-tron 2000. he puts the jacket in and add designs to it. Spidey decides to add a bouncy spring, a helicopter, and a bouncy spring so her jacket won't be torn. But Mr. Fantastic warns him that adding all those things can cause problems. When aunt May finishes comes back, she tries on her new jacket to finish her errands. When Spidey thanks Mr. Fantastic, WEB-STER alerts them that Green Goblin is causing trouble downtown. When Aunt May is finished, she sees Green Goblin throwing his pumpkin goo pranks on people. Her safety jacket activates a paddle to stop him, and she meets Mr. Fantastic in person. So, she decides to be superhero to help them. But he warns her that being a superhero is dangerous, which makes Spidey realize his mistake. She activates it again to make her fly and calls herself "Mighty May"! But she sees Rhino robbing the bank she activates the airbag. But Doc Ock decides to wear it to prevent superheroes to stop her. After May catches the kitten, CAL distracts her to make Doc Ock trap her and take her to her lair. May activates the jacket with boxing gloves, Then Doc Ock's octobots attack the heroes and aunt May which causes her to realize being a superhero is a lot harder. It's up to Spidey and Mr. Fantastic to stop Doc Ock before she keeps the jacket. Electro Overload: Team Spidey drive their Rescue-Webs vehicles and enjoy a quiet night in the city, when all of the sudden they see the ice cream truck glowing in the dark, so they decide to get ice cream. But Electro overhears this and decides to use her Zip-Zapper to steal all the electricity as always. So, Team Spidey goes after her again. But Electro uses her device to get free from their webs. She then goes to the power station to steal all the power. When Spin grabs her Zip-Zapper. it broke. But this causes Electro to be electrified an unstoppable. She then controls everything that has electricity and steals Spidey's copter. It's up to Team Spidey to stop her and get all the electricity back before she rules the city.
110	7	"Symbie's Blobbies"	Greg Johnson	Bora Moon, Daniela Smith-Fischer, Irene Huang, Peter MacAdams, Sarah Piironen, Toren Atkinson, W. Travis Johnson, Sophia Ziqing Li, David Nguyen, & Mehmet Kenan Sinav	August 14, 2026	TBA	N/A
110	7	"Gobby's Barnyard Blaster"	Daka Hermon	Bora Moon, Daniela Smith-Fischer, Irene Huang, Peter MacAdams, Sarah Piironen, Toren Atkinson, W. Travis Johnson, Sophia Ziqing Li, David Nguyen, & Mehmet Kenan Sinav	August 14, 2026	TBA	N/A
Symbie's Blobbies: Peter and Gwen and playing with a water balloon and Miles is doing tricks with his yo-yo at the park. Symbie shows up with his slime balls and targets a bench but hears flower vendor yelling out people to get purple flowers which causes the kids to see it. They suit up as Team Spidey and web him up to stop. They talk about how he can make one big mess as a little villain. This gives Symbie an idea to make more messes by making more Symbies. He goes into his lair and makes more calling them Blobbies. He then tells them to cause trouble in the city and make a mess. WEB-STER alerts Team Spidey that Symbie and his blobbies hit slime all over the plaza. As Team Spidey webs them up or trap them, it fails. But his blobbies decide to slime Symbie which makes him think slimy ball is no fun. It's up to Team Spidey to stop Symbie and his blobbies before the city is theirs, even though Symbie helps Team Spidey to stop them. Gobby's Barnyard Blaster: At the community center, Spidey and Spin come over to help Farmer John and H.E.R.B.I.E. to set up the community center zoo and help every animal to be fed and petted. As soon as H.E.R.B.I.E. puts Gus the goat back into the pen, Green Goblin shows up with his barnyard blaster to make people act like animals. It's up to Spidey, Spin, and H.E.R.B.I.E. to stop Green Goblin before he takes over the city with his own peace and quiet.
111	8	"Gobby's Leprechaun Caper"	Written by : Claudia Sivler; Story by : Daka Hermon	Bora Moon, Cheuk Po, John Young, Mincheul Park, Peter MacAdams, Tim Wu, Toren Atkinson, W. Travis Johnson, Sophia Ziqing Li, David Nguyen, Mehmet Kenan Sinav, & Nicole Wang	August 21, 2026	TBA	N/A
111	8	"Kitty Cat Thief"	Written by : Sib Ventress; Story by : Daka Hermon	Bora Moon, Cheuk Po, John Young, Mincheul Park, Peter MacAdams, Tim Wu, Toren Atkinson, W. Travis Johnson, Sophia Ziqing Li, David Nguyen, Mehmet Kenan Sinav, & Nicole Wang	August 21, 2026	TBA	N/A
Gobby's Leprechaun Caper: Peter and Miles meet Gwen and her father George at the community center to get ready for St. Patrick's Day. After they get the food ready, WEB-STER alerts the kids that a leprechaun is causing a disturbance in the city. They suit up as Team Spidey to figure it out. He goes in the city and splatting green on everything that's not green and teleports every time he touches his bracelet. It turns out it's Green Goblin that makes himself big and small. He escapes with Rhino and takes him to find his pot of gold at the community center. When Team Spidey arrives there, it turns out Gobby has a fake pot of gold that will splat green goo once the timer is done. It's up to Team Spidey to save St. Patrick's Day before everything before the villains ruin the whole city. Kitty Cat Thief: Gwen meets Miles and his little sister Billie at the library for Kitty Cat story time. Everyone is wearing their Kitty Cat crown and Captain Crocodile hats. But Black Cat shows up and steals the Princess Kitty Cat book. Gwen and Miles suit up as Ghost-Spider and Spin to get it back. But she bumps into Rhino and he steals it after Ghosty and Spin web her up. It turns out the villains love Princess Kitty Cat. Then Zola shows up and sees Rhino having the book. When Ghosty and Spin web up Rhino at the construction building Zola steals the book too. They chase Zola until they approach Doc Ock and CAL's octo-ship. Doc Ock and CAL noticed that Zola has the book, so they decide to steal it from him and capture him too and exit him out. When Ghosty and Spin get into her ship, they set off an alarm causing her octo-bots to get them. It's up to the heroes to stop Doc Ock, CAL, and their octo-bots before they keep the book forever.
112	9	"Silk Swings In"	Written by : Danielle Kreger; Story by : Daka Hermon	Aiken Chau, Anita Vu, Bora Moon, Daniela Smith-Fischer, Hideki Yumitani, Irene Hunag, Sarah Piironen, Toren Atkinson, Sophia Ziqing Li, David Nguyen, & Mehmet Kenan Sinav	September 4, 2026	TBA	N/A
112	9	"Gobby and Rhino's Webby Adventure"	Daka Hermon	Aiken Chau, Anita Vu, Bora Moon, Daniela Smith-Fischer, Hideki Yumitani, Irene Hunag, Sarah Piironen, Toren Atkinson, Sophia Ziqing Li, David Nguyen, & Mehmet Kenan Sinav	September 4, 2026	TBA	N/A
Silk Swings In: Team Spidey are stacking cards to make a tallest tower, but they fell down. WEB-STER alerts Team Spidey that Doc Ock is causing trouble downtown. She's robbing every store and blasting people with her Slow-Mo Blaster and the whole city. Just as Spin grabs it from her, Silk shows up and bounces her ricochet webs on her. Team Spidey and Silk introduce each other and decide to stop Doc Ock together, but Silk rushes and tries to stop her alone while Team Spidey tells her to stop so they can come up with a plan. But after Silk breaks invention she gets tangled up with Spidey and traps them in her cage. She calls her octobots to stop Ghosty and Spin and slows them down too. It's up to Team Spidey and Silk to stop her before she takes over the city. But first, Silk has to learn to stop rushing in, take a deep breath, think things through and listens to Team Spidey's plans. Gobby and Rhino's Webby Adventure: Ghosty and Spin are fixing the playground but they're almost out of webs. Spidey comes in just in time to introduce their new web shooters that now have extra web fluids. But Gobby and Rhino steal Mr. Kielbasa's hot dog cart and soon as they stop them, Spidey notices the new web shooters are on Gobby's glider. Luckily, Gobby has his invention glider finder to help him find it. When he and Rhino finally found it, they found Team Spidey's web shooters and decide to use them to become super baddies. Team Spidey looks for the backpack until WEB-STER alerts Team Spidey that the bank has been robbed again. When they got there, Gobby calls himself Scare-rantula and Rhino calls himself Baddie Long Legs. Together, they call themselves the spider baddies. Spidey realizes they stole his backpack and his web shooters, and they trap Team Spidey when they're out of webs. It's up to Team Spidey to stop the baddies before they rob the city again.
113	10	"It's Raining Pranks"	Written by : Greg Johnson; Story by : Daka Hermon	Abigail Domstad, Anita Vu, Anna Bohac, Hideki Yumitani, John Young, Mincheul Park, Tim Wu, Sophia Ziqing Li, David Nguyen, Mehmet Kenan Sinav, & Nicole Wang	September 11, 2026	TBA	N/A
113	10	"Jeff Bites Back"	Claudia Silver	Abigail Domstad, Anita Vu, Anna Bohac, Hideki Yumitani, John Young, Mincheul Park, Tim Wu, Sophia Ziqing Li, David Nguyen, Mehmet Kenan Sinav, & Nicole Wang	September 11, 2026	TBA	N/A
It's Raining Pranks: Spidey, Rocket, and Groot are getting ready for the big city picnic. But Green Goblin shows up in his weather cloud releasing his weather pranks. But Groot wants to read his favorite fairytale story "Jack and the Beanstalk" and he wants to release his growing leaf powers to stop him. It's up to the heroes to stop him before the park becomes a mess. Jeff Bites Back: Web-Beard arrives with Jeff to tell Team Spidey to look after the little shark. But Jeff starts chewing on anything that he sees due to the tooth loss. Luckily Web-Beard gives him his favorite chew toy Sir Bones. A girl with her dog Rufus takes a selfie with them, the pretzel vendor, Team Spidey, and Jeff he drops his chew toy in which Rufus takes it. After Jeff eats a pretzel, he panics that his chew toy Sir Bones is gone. Without Sir Bones, Jeff chews on everything he can find. WEB-STER alerts Team Spidey that Doc Ock is causing trouble downtown with her new invention The Bouncerator. She pushes the button which causes everything to bounce. But Jeff looks at her invention and sees that he found his chew toy after all. Team Spidey catches everything that bounces while Doc Ock kidnaps Jeff with her garbage truck and takes him to her lair. CAL gets a pretzel which causes Jeff to drop her invention and she releases her invention to cause Team Spidey but Jeff snatches it back to make her bounce too. It's up to Team Spidey to stop her before she robs downtown again and keep Jeff from chewing on everything at the same time. But he lets it go of it and after he found the real Sir Bones. After all that adventure, Web Beard arrives to pick up Jeff, he drops his chew toy, because he has a new tooth that grew in.
114	11	"A Very Symbie Christmas"	N/A	TBA	December 2, 2026	TBA	TBD
114	11	"Squirrel Girl's Arctic Adventure"	N/A	TBA	December 2, 2026	TBA	TBD
115	12	"Zola's Royal Robot Revolt"	N/A	TBA	December 18, 2026	TBA	TBD
115	12	"A Watery Webs Rescue"	N/A	TBA	December 18, 2026	TBA	TBD

== Shorts ==
Note: The shorts are titled Meet Spidey and His Amazing Friends.

=== Season 1 (2021) ===
No. overall	No. in season	Title	Original release date
1	1	"WEB-STER"	June 21, 2021
2	2	"S.O.S. Kitty"	June 21, 2021
3	3	"Spidey Mystery"	June 22, 2021
4	4	"A Helping Hulk"	June 23, 2021
5	5	"Spidey Surprise"	June 24, 2021
6	6	"Rock-a-Bye Rhino"	June 25, 2021
7	7	"Stop Doc Ock"	June 26, 2021
8	8	"The Spidey Team"	June 27, 2021
9	9	"Monkeying Around"	June 28, 2021
10	10	"Power Practice"	July 5, 2021
11	11	"Road Raging Rhino"	July 12, 2021

=== Season 2 (2022) ===
No. overall	No. in season	Title	Original release date
12	1	"Spidey Team Transport to the Rescue"	July 18, 2022
13	2	"Iron Man Lends a Hand"	July 18, 2022
14	3	"A Teeny Tiny Solution"	July 19, 2022
15	4	"A Dino Mite Friend"	July 19, 2022
16	5	"Hulk's Hangout"	July 20, 2022
17	6	"Red Light Green Light"	July 20, 2022
18	7	"Hi Felicia"	July 21, 2022
19	8	"When Ghosty Met TWIRL-E"	July 21, 2022
20	9	"Practice Makes You Better"	July 22, 2022
21	10	"Webs Up"	July 23, 2022

=== Season 3 (2023–24) ===
No. overall	No. in season	Title	Original release date
22	1	"Tricks for You, Treats for Me"	September 29, 2023
23	2	"The New WQ"	November 6, 2023
24	3	"Zola Song"	November 7, 2023
25	4	"Web-Spinner Suits"	November 8, 2023
26	5	"Thing and Herbie"	November 9, 2023
27	6	"Web-Spinner Song"	November 10, 2023
28	7	"Do the Spidey"	June 17, 2024
29	8	"Go Dino-Webs Go"	June 18, 2024
30	9	"Meet Lizard"	June 19, 2024
31	10	"Welcome White Tiger"	June 20, 2024
32	11	"The Treehouse Twist"	June 21, 2024

=== Season 4 (2025) ===
No. overall	No. in season	Title	Original release date
33	1	"Spidey Pirate Ship"	June 25, 2025
34	2	"Webs Ahoy!"	June 25, 2025
35	3	"Spidey Island!"	June 25, 2025
36	4	"Wondeful Water-Webs"	June 25, 2025
37	5	"Captain America Lends a Hand"	June 25, 2025
38	6	"Meet Hydro-Man"	June 25, 2025
39	7	"Pirate Gobby"	June 25, 2025
40	8	"Doc Ock's Marine Mischief"	June 25, 2025
41	9	"Underwater Rescue"	June 25, 2025
42	10	"It's Jeff"	June 25, 2025

=== Season 5 (2026) ===
No. overall	No. in season	Title	Original release date
43	1	"Meet Symbie!"	May 1, 2026
44	2	"Symbie Likes Crash-Crash"	June 9, 2026
45	3	"Rocket and Groot Are Here to Help"	June 9, 2026
46	4	"The Fantastic Mr. Fantastic"	June 9, 2026
47	5	"Along Came Silk"	June 9, 2026
48	6	"Rescue-Webs Go!"	June 9, 2026
49	7	"Rescue-Webs Firetruck"	June 9, 2026
50	8	"Rescue-Webs Boat and Spin Cycle"	June 9, 2026
51	9	"Groot Meets Jeff the Land Shark"	June 9, 2026
52	10	"Rescue-Webs Copter"	June 9, 2026

== Team-Up! specials ==
On August 8, 2025, it was announced that characters from Spidey and His Amazing Friends would appear in two 22-minute crossover specials alongside characters from Iron Man and His Awesome Friends, which premiered three days later on August 11. The second Halloween-themed special was revealed during the Celebrate 65 Years of Marvel's Spider-Man! panel at D23: The Ultimate Disney Fan Event in Anaheim, California on August 15, 2026.

Both specials utilize the setting of Spidey and His Amazing Friends and function as backdoor pilots for Avengers: Mightiest Friends, an upcoming series announced alongside the first special and scheduled to premiere in 2027.

No.	Title	Directed by	Written by	Storyboarded by	Original release date	Prod. code	U.S. viewers (millions)
1	"Spidey and Iron Man: Avengers Team-Up!"	Darren Bachynski & Mitch Stookey	Bart Jennett	Abigal Domstad, Aiken Chau, Hideki Yumitani, Irene Huang, Nicole Wang, Daniela Smith-Fischer, Toren Atkinson, W. Travis Johnson, Sophia Ziqing Li, David Nguyen, Mehmet Kenan Sinav, & Sarah Piironen	October 16, 2025	TBA	N/A
While Ghost-Spider and Spin are out of town, Spidey is left to protect the city and encounters Green Goblin, whose glider is disrupted by Ultron. Ultron reveals that he has developed a device capable of controlling technology throughout the city, disabling both Spidey's web-shooters and Iron Man's armor. The Avengers intervene and stop Ultron's initial attack before taking Spidey and Iron Man to Avengers Tower to repair their equipment. Ultron subsequently forms an alliance with Green Goblin, and the two villains lure the heroes from the tower before seizing control of it and upgrading their equipment. Spidey and Black Panther infiltrate the building and disable its security system, allowing the other heroes to re-enter the building. Unfortunately, Ultron and Green Goblin capture and trap several of the Avengers in a cage, leaving only Spidey and Iron Man to oppose the villains themselves. The villains' alliance eventually breaks down due to their mutual distrust and arguing, which also places nearby civilians in danger when their actions threaten to collapse a bridge.
2	"Spidey and the Avengers: Halloween Team-Up!"	Darren Bachynski & Mitch Stookey	Bart Jennett	Aiken Chau, Becky Wedel, Cheuk Po, Clint Morris, Irene Huang, Nicole Wang, Daniela Smith-Fischer, Mincheul Park, Selena Marchetti, Toren Atkinson, W. Travis Johnson, Sophia Ziqing Li, & Sarah Piironen	September 24, 2026	TBA	N/A
During Halloween festivities in New York City, Mr. Von Carnegie accidentally releases Hallows' Eve from her cauldron. Joined by her companion Jack O'Lantern, the witch uses her magic to cause a series of supernatural disturbances throughout the city and scare everyone on Halloween. As their actions threaten to disrupt the holiday, Spidey teams up with the Avengers to stop them and restore order. While confronting the villains' magical attacks, the heroes also contend with Hulk's fear of bats, which is further intensified when Hallows' Eve turns herself into a giant bat and plans to ruin the Halloween party being held at the community center. Spidey must help Hulk overcome his fears as they work together to counter the villains' disruptions. Note: This special marks the first animated appearance of Hallows' Eve.
