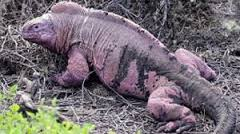

Conservation status
- Critically Endangered (IUCN 3.1)
- CITES Appendix II

Scientific classification
- Kingdom: Animalia
- Phylum: Chordata
- Class: Reptilia
- Order: Squamata
- Suborder: Iguania
- Family: Iguanidae
- Genus: Conolophus
- Species: C. marthae

Binomial name
- Conolophus marthae Gentile & Snell, 2009

= Conolophus marthae =

Species of reptile

Conolophus marthae, also known commonly as the Galápagos pink land iguana, is a species of lizard of the family Iguanidae. This critically endangered iguana is native only to the Wolf Volcano in northern Isabela Island of the Galápagos Islands (Ecuador). It has a pink body with some dark stripes, prompting some to call it the pink iguana or the Galápagos rosy iguana. The species was first discovered in 1986, and in 2009 it was identified as a separate species, distinct from the Galápagos land iguana. The species C. marthae is the only example of ancient diversification in the genus Conolophus.

== Taxonomy and etymology ==
A tentative specific name, rosada, was derived from the Spanish word meaning "pinkish" in reference to the animal's pinkish body color. The term was later abandoned for the formal description; and the specific name, marthae, was chosen in memory of Martha Rebecca Gentile, the stillborn daughter of the describer Gabriele Gentile.

The species was first formally described in early 2009 as being distinct from the other land iguana populations. An initial genetic analysis of the pink subpopulation indicated that this particular species diverged from a common ancestor with C. subcristatus and C. pallidus some 5.7 million years past. A more recent study indicates that the split is more recent and occurred about 1.5 million years ago.

== Anatomy ==
Conolophus marthae is anatomically similar to the closely related species, C. subcristatus. Both exemplify the typical saurian body shape, having squat, quadrupedal bodies with elongated tails. The legs sprawl out to the sides like all lizards, and a row of short spines runs down the middle of the lizard's back starting from the base of the neck to the tail. However, there are a few anatomical differences between the two species. The crest of C. marthae has been described as somewhat different from that of C. subcristatus. The most apparent difference is that of coloration – the body of C. marthae is pinkish with a few wide, vertical dark bands. This is a stark contrast from the yellow-brown coloration of C. subcristatus. Additionally, the territorial head-nodding display of C. marthae is more complex than the display by the other land iguana species.

The holotype of C. marthae, which was released after measurements and samples were taken, is an adult male that weighs 5 kg (11 lb), has a snout-vent length of 47 cm (19 in) and a tail length of 61.4 cm (24.2 in).

== Discovery and geographic range ==
Individuals of the species Conolophus marthae first came into the public light in 1986 when park rangers spotted some pink lizards on the Wolf Volcano on Isabela Island, but a more thorough study by scientists only began in 2000. This volcano encompasses the entire distribution of the species and the range covers only 25 km^{2} (10 mi^{2}), at altitudes between 600 and 1,700 m (2,000–5,600 ft).

== Conservation ==
Fewer than 200 mature individuals of Conolophus marthae remain. When first described, it was suggested that it should be considered a critically endangered species due to its tiny range and population, and this recommendation was followed when the IUCN reviewed its status in 2012. The area where it lives is uninhabited by humans, and also difficult to access, which limits research into the species. The Galápagos pink land iguana is threatened by introduced feral cats and black rats, which can take eggs and young. The only native predator of the species is the Galápagos hawk. Other threats are possible hybridization with Galápagos land iguanas (unknown at present, but has occurred based on genetic evidence), as the ranges of the two species come into contact, and chance events such as eruptions of Wolf Volcano, which has happened as recently as 2022. It has been proposed that a captive breeding program should be established for the Galápagos pink land iguana, similar to the successful program already established for some populations of the Galápagos land iguana.
