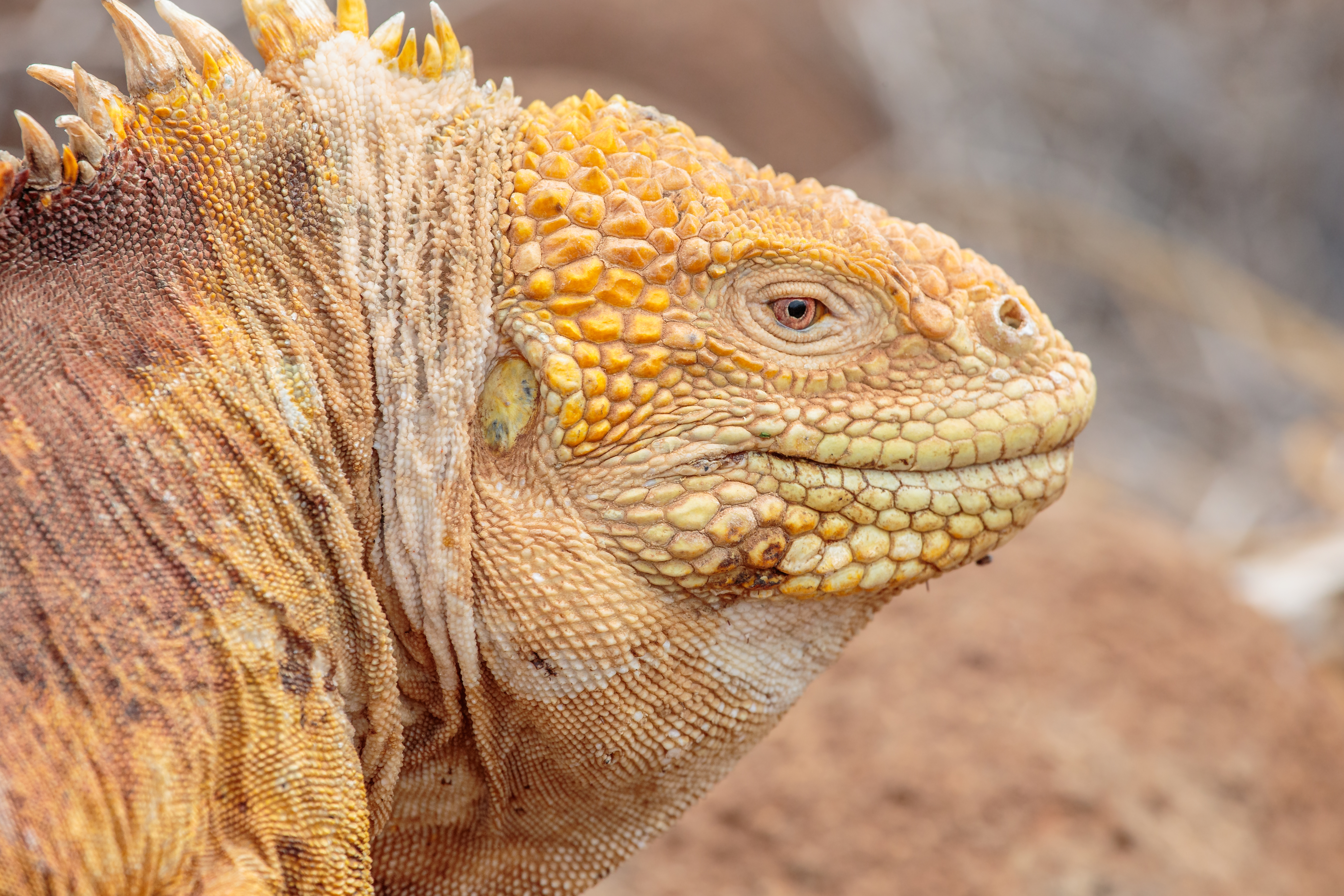
- Conolophus subcristatus

Scientific classification
- Kingdom: Animalia
- Phylum: Chordata
- Class: Reptilia
- Order: Squamata
- Suborder: Iguania
- Family: Iguanidae
- Genus: Conolophus; Fitzinger, 1843

Type species
- Conolophus subcristatus

Species
- Conolophus subcristatus; Conolophus marthae; Conolophus pallidus

= Conolophus =

Galápagos land iguana

Genus of lizards

Conolophus is a genus of lizards, also known commonly as Galápagos land iguanas, in the family Iguanidae. The genus is endemic to the Galápagos Islands of Ecuador. The number of species of this variable genus has always been disputed; the most current taxonomic surveys suggest that three species exist.

== Extant species ==
Image	Species	Common Name	Distribution
	C. subcristatus (Gray, 1831)	Galápagos land iguana	Fernandina Island, Isabela Island, Santa Cruz Island, North Seymour Island, Baltra Island, and South Plaza Island
	C. marthae Gentile & Snell, 2009	Galápagos pink land iguana	Wolf Volcano, Northern Isabela Island
	C. pallidus Heller, 1903	Santa Fe land iguana	Santa Fe Island
