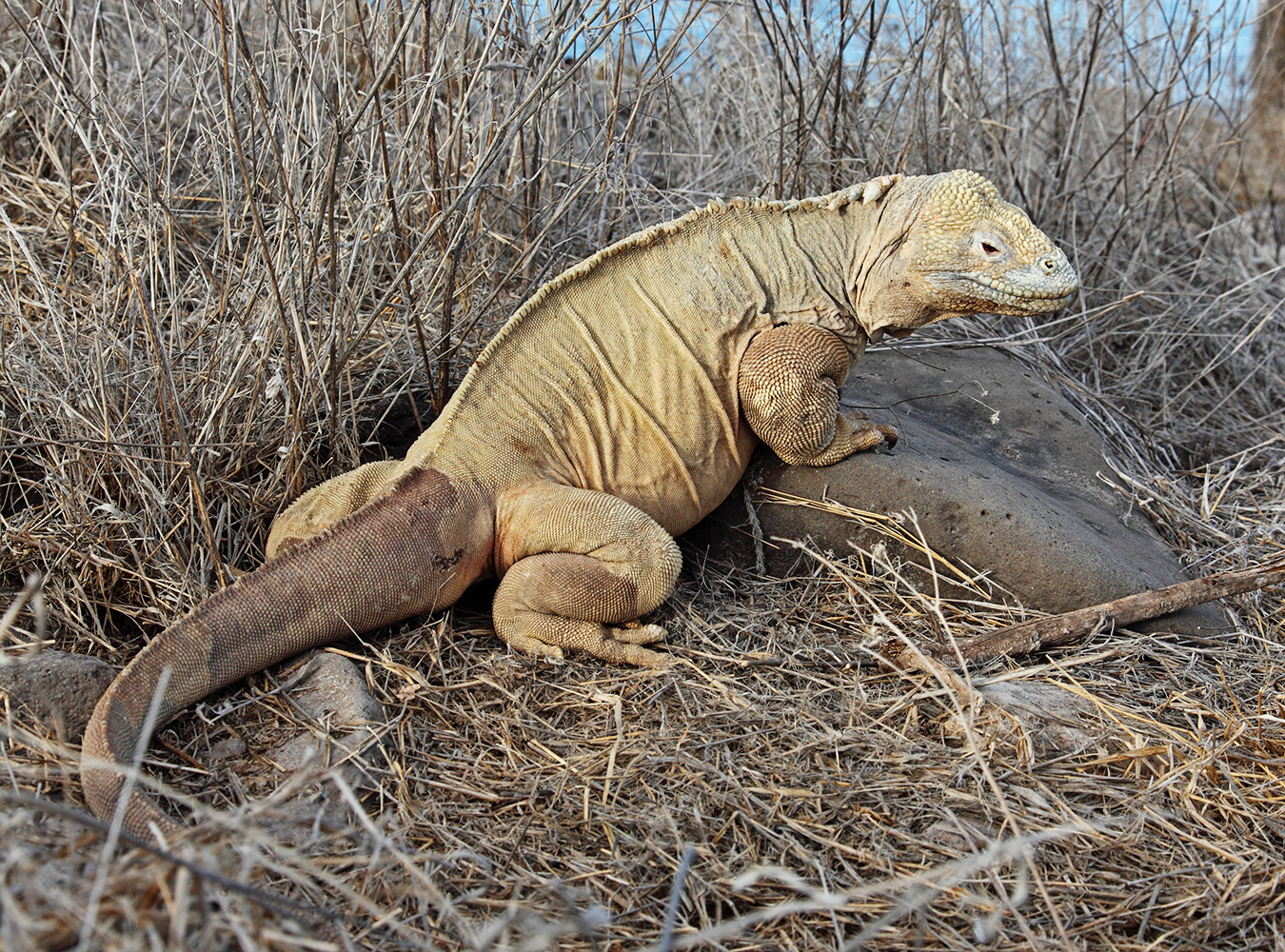

Conservation status
- Vulnerable (IUCN 3.1)
- CITES Appendix II (CITES)

Scientific classification
- Kingdom: Animalia
- Phylum: Chordata
- Class: Reptilia
- Order: Squamata
- Suborder: Iguania
- Family: Iguanidae
- Genus: Conolophus
- Species: C. pallidus

Binomial name
- Conolophus pallidus Heller, 1903

= Conolophus pallidus =

Species of lizard

Conolophus pallidus, also known commonly as the Santa Fe land iguana and the Barrington land iguana, is a species of lizard in the family Iguanidae. It is one of three species in the genus Conolophus and is endemic to Santa Fe Island in the Galapagos.

== Taxonomy ==
The species Conolophus pallidus was first described by American zoologist Edmund Heller in 1903. Some authorities have questioned whether C. pallidus is a valid species in its own right or merely a variant or subspecies of the Galapagos land iguana (C. subcristatus) found on other islands in the Galapagos.

== Etymology ==
The specific name, pallidus, is Latin for "pale", denoting its lighter coloration than C. subcristatus.

== Morphology ==
The Santa Fe land iguana is similar to the Galapagos land iguana except that the Santa Fe land iguana is paler yellow with a longer more tapered snout and more pronounced dorsal spines.

The Santa Fe land iguana grows to a total length (including tail) of 0.91 m (3 ft) with a body weight of up to 11 kg (25 lb).

== Behavior and ecology ==
Being cold-blooded, Conolophis pallidus absorbs heat from the sun, basking on volcanic rocks, and at night sleeps in burrows to conserve its body heat. This iguana also enjoys a symbiotic relationship with the island's finches; the birds remove parasites and ticks, providing relief to the iguana and food for the birds.

== Diet ==
The Santa Fe land iguana is primarily herbivorous. However, some individuals have shown that it is an opportunistic carnivore supplementing its diet with insects, centipedes, and carrion. Because fresh water is scarce on the islands it inhabits, C. pallidus obtains the majority of its moisture from the prickly-pear cactus that makes up 80% of its diet. It eats the fruit, flowers, pads, and even the spines. During the rainy season it will drink from available standing pools of water and eat yellow flowers of the genus Portulaca.
