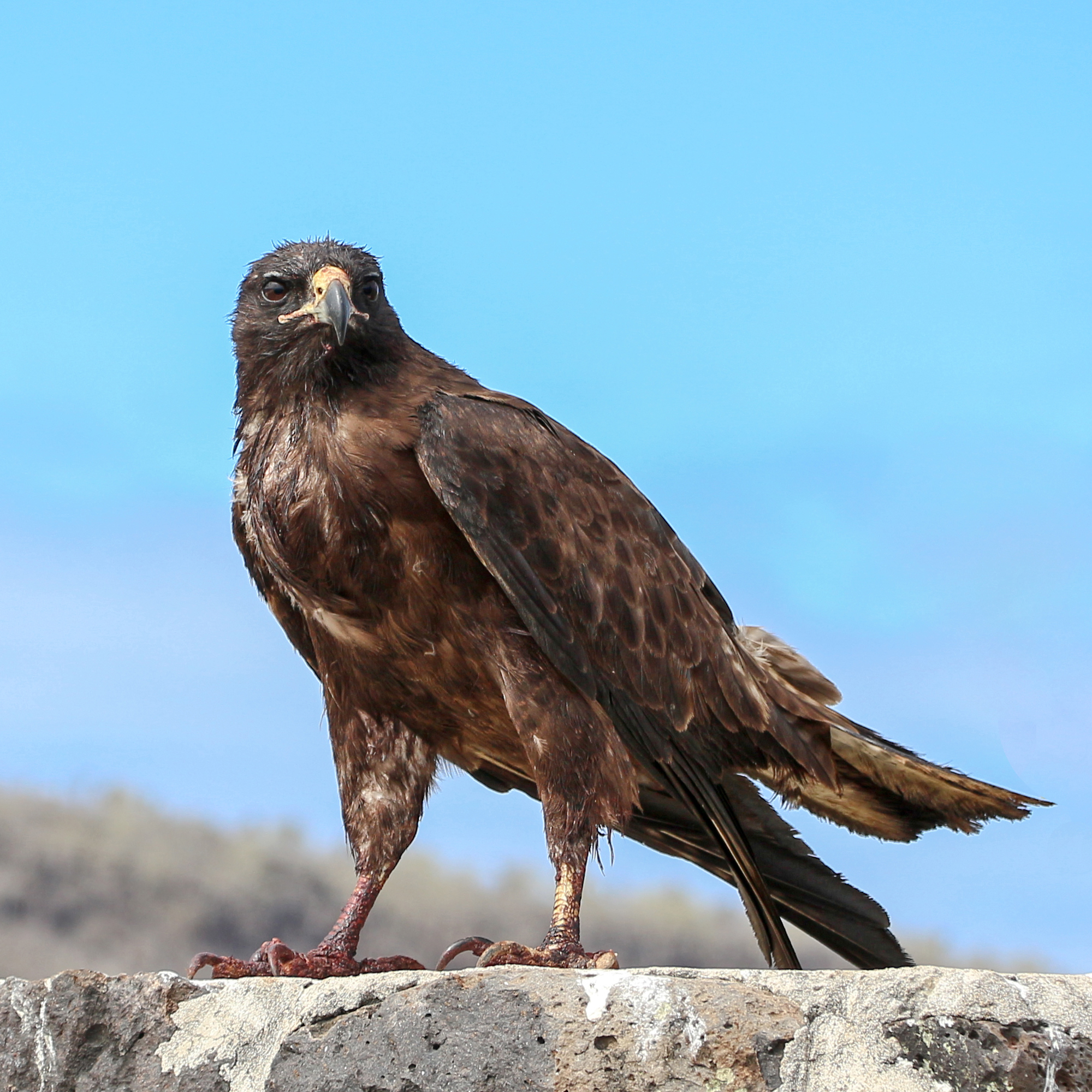
- Adult on Santa Fe Island

Conservation status
- Vulnerable (IUCN 3.1)

Scientific classification
- Kingdom: Animalia
- Phylum: Chordata
- Class: Aves
- Order: Accipitriformes
- Family: Accipitridae
- Genus: Buteo
- Species: B. galapagoensis

Binomial name
- Buteo galapagoensis (Gould, 1837)
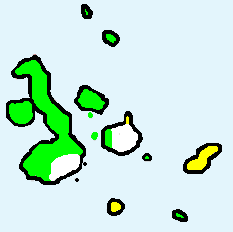

= Galapagos hawk =

Galápagos hawk

Species of bird

The Galápagos hawk (Buteo galapagoensis) is a large hawk endemic to most of the Galápagos Islands.

== Description ==
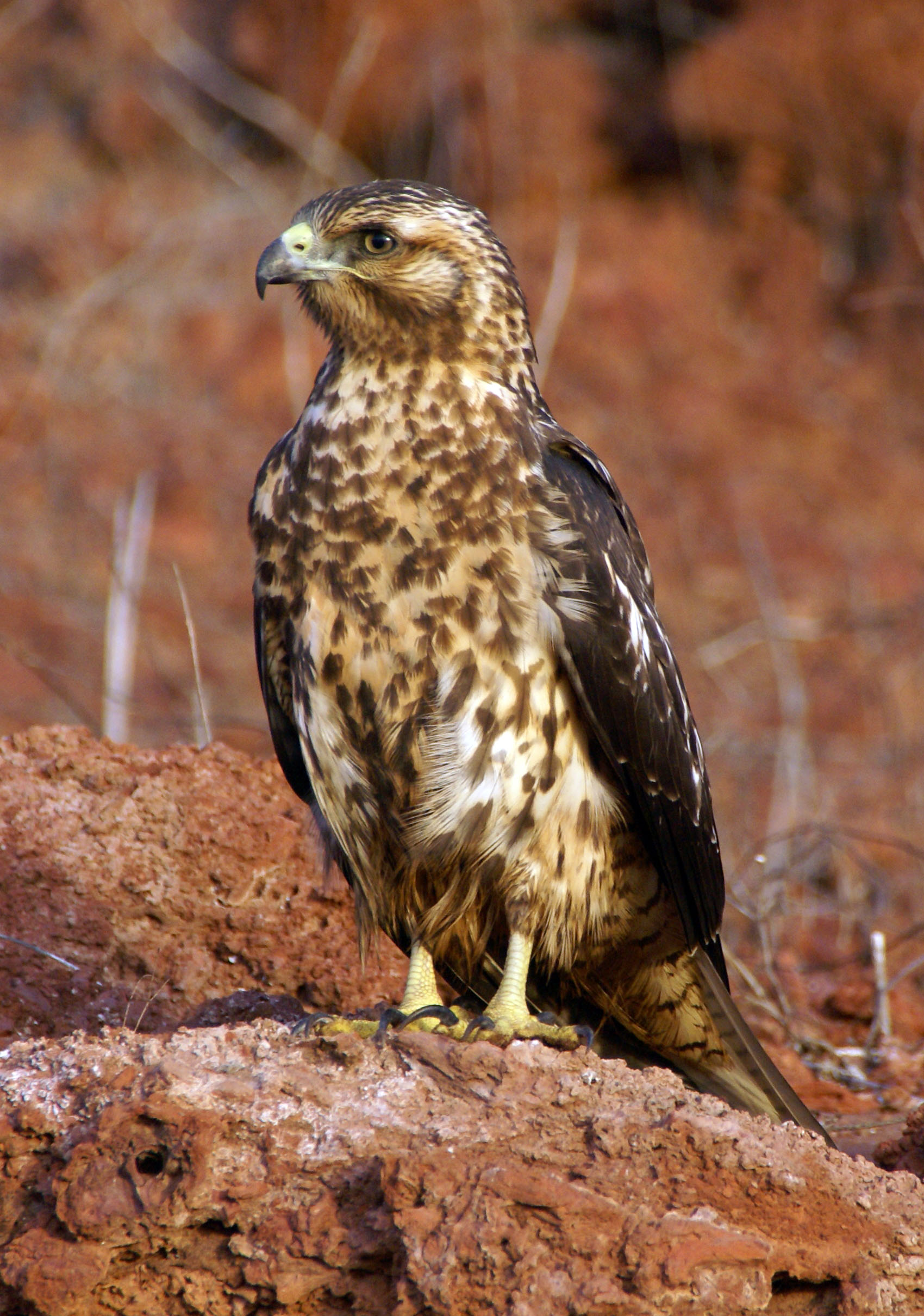
Juvenile

The Galapágos hawk is similar in size to the red-tailed hawk (Buteo jamaicensis) and the Swainson's hawk (Buteo swainsoni) of North America, but the size is variable across the islands as is recorded for many animals native to the Galápagos. They appear to be somewhat more heavily built than those well-known mainland species, and going on average weights, this species is the second heaviest Buteo in the Americas, behind only the ferruginous hawk. The Galápagos hawk can range from 45 to 58 cm (18 to 23 in) in length from beak to tail with a wingspan of 116 to 140 cm (46 to 55 in). The smallest hawk sizes recorded are on Marchena Island, where males average 844 g (1.861 lb) and females average 1,223 g (2.696 lb). Intermediate in size are the hawks of Santiago Island, on which males weigh an average of 963 g (2.123 lb) while females average 1,295 g (2.855 lb). The largest known are the hawks on Española Island, which are amongst the largest Buteo known anywhere, with males averaging 1,137 g (2.507 lb) and females averaging 1,578 g (3.479 lb). The adult hawk has various coloring within the species.

The adult Galapagos hawk is generally a sooty brownish-black color; the crown being slightly blacker than the back. Its feathers of the mantle are partially edged with paler brown, grey, or buff, with their white bases showing to some extent. Their tail coverts are also barred with white. The tail itself is silvery grey above, with about ten narrow black bars; below it is quite pale. The wing feathers are paler on inner webs, barred with white. Below it has indistinct rufous edges to the feathers of the flanks and lower abdomen. The under-tail coverts are barred with white. Under-wing coverts are black, contrasting with the pale bases of the wing quills. The eyes are brown, the beak greyish black, paler at its base which is known as the 'cere', legs, and feet are yellow. The male hawk is smaller than the female hawk, as with many birds of prey.

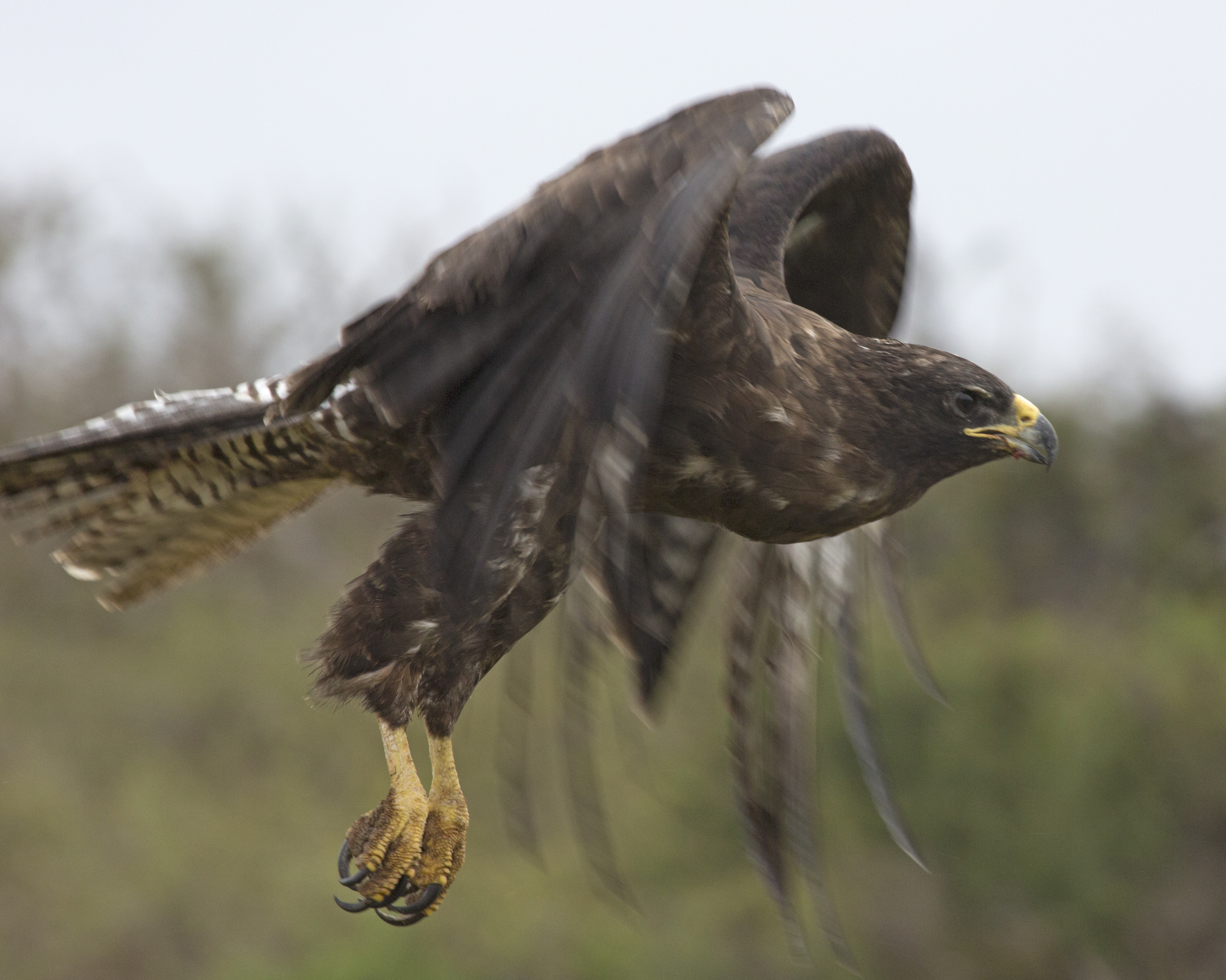
Galapagos hawk in flight.

The young hawks however appear quite different from the adults in that they are well camouflaged with an overall brown appearance with varying amounts of striping below and paler mottling above. Their eyes are light grey-brown, and the beak is black, blue-grey at its base. The cere is grey-green, the feet pale yellow-green. When the immature plumage becomes badly worn, the pale areas become almost white.

The Galapágos hawk has broad wings and a broad tail. It is an apex predator and possesses excellent vision. Their young appear different from adults because they are darker and have camouflage which aids them in remaining protected from potential predators until they are fully grown.

== Habitat and diet ==
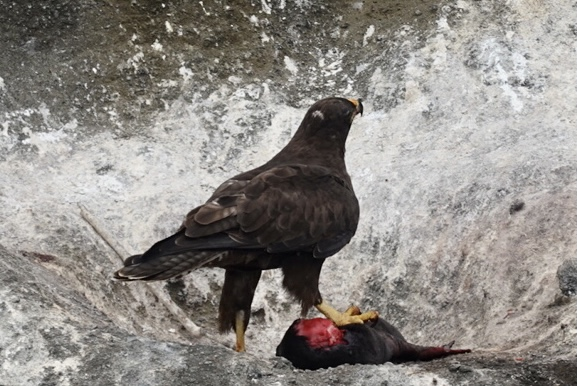
Hawk on Isabela Island, protecting its meal, a dead newborn sea lion pup

This hawk lives mainly on insects such as locusts and giant centipedes, as well as racer snakes (Alsophis spp.), lava lizards (Microlophus albemarlensis), and both native and introduced species of rodents, including Galápagos rice rats (Aegialomys galapagoensis), house mice (Mus musculus), and black rats (Rattus rattus). It is not uncommon for it to take marine iguanas (Amblyrhynchus cristatus). Most of the marine iguana prey are mainly hatchlings and juveniles but occasionally adults, especially nesting females. The Galapagos hawk can kill relatively large individuals, which can weigh at least equal to the hawk's own weight or even heavier. Hatchlings of tortoise, sea turtle, and land iguanas are additionally taken, as well as young of Galápagos sea lions, feral pigs, and goats. Arboreal prey include Galapagos Doves (Zenaida galapagoensis), Galapagos Mockingbirds (Mimus parvulus), and Darwin's finches (Geospiza spp. & Camarhynchus spp.), from their egg to full-grown adults. This predator has also been observed to take seabirds such as Galapagos Shearwaters (Puffinus subalaris), and eggs and nestlings of swallow-tailed gulls (Creagrus furcatus). Regular predation on blue-footed booby (Sula nebouxii) nestlings, which can weigh around 1280g, has been reported. Aside from live prey, carrions are additionally taken, from dead seals to fish scraps.

Hunting in groups of two or three, the hawks soar at a height of 50 to 200 m (160 to 660 ft) in the sky. When one of the birds spots prey or a rotting carcass, they signal to the other members. The dominant hawk of the group feeds from the prey until it is satisfied, as the other hawks in the family group submissively wait their turn to feed. It prefers to perch on a lava outcrop or high branch when hunting, yet it also spends some of its time on the ground.

Fearless of man, the young especially being quite curious, often wandering around human camps and scavenging for scraps of food. In 1845, Charles Darwin wrote:

A gun is here almost superfluous; for with the muzzle I pushed a hawk out of the branch of a tree...

== Behavior and breeding ==
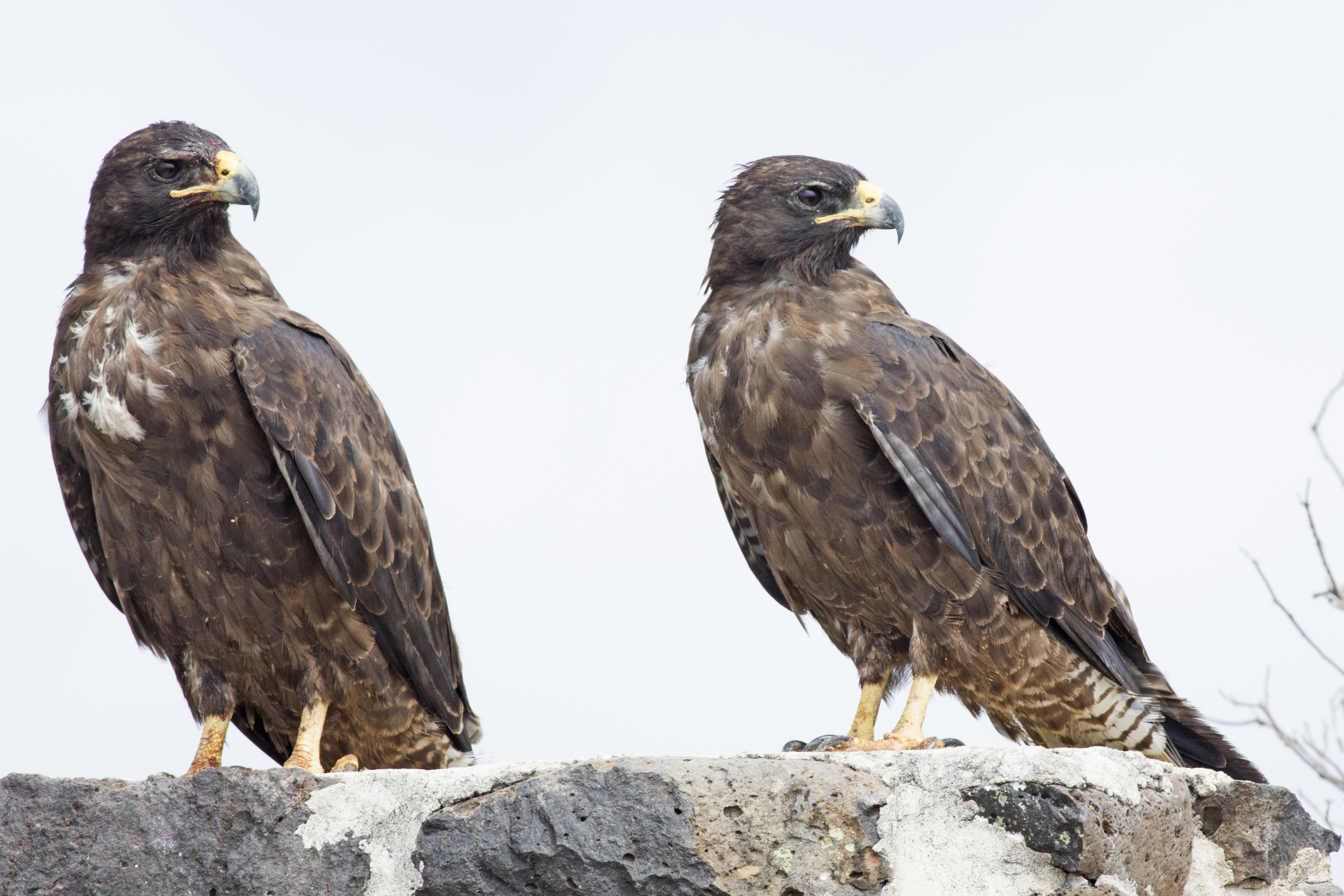
A possible breeding pair of adults on Santa Fe Island.

Because the seasons of the island are unchanging due to the close proximity of the equator, there is no regular mating season. Mating occurs a few times a day on a nearby perch or in flight. It begins when males make fake attacks on the female from behind by dive-bombing her, and then the male follows the female as she descends to the trees below. While males tend to be monogamous, the females will occasionally mate with up to seven different males during the mating season. Throughout the entire nesting period, the female and all of her males take turns protecting the nest, incubating the eggs, and even participating in the feeding with no apparent dominance order. Nests are built low in trees, on lava ledges, or even on the ground at times. Used for many years and nesting periods, they become quite large, sometimes even four feet in diameter. Stick structures are lined with grass, bark, clumps of leaves, or other available soft materials.

The mating pair is together for the majority of the time at the prime of the egg-laying season and usually stays close to the nesting site. The nest is maintained constantly with fresh, green twigs. Usually, one to three green-white colored eggs are laid, though clutches with 3 eggs are unusual. Usually, only one youngster is reared from each nest, but polyandrous groups are more successful than monogamous pairs, though each polyandrous male produces fewer young per year than monogamous males. Young hawks leave the nest around 50–60 days after hatching. Juvenile hawks will not enter the territorial breeding areas until they reach the age of three, becoming sexually mature.

=== Voice ===
The call of the Galapágos hawk is a series of short screams similar to the call of the red-shouldered hawk that has been described as a "keer, keeu," or an inflected "kwee". Especially noisy during mating season, their call softens to a "kilp, kilp, kilp".

== Status ==
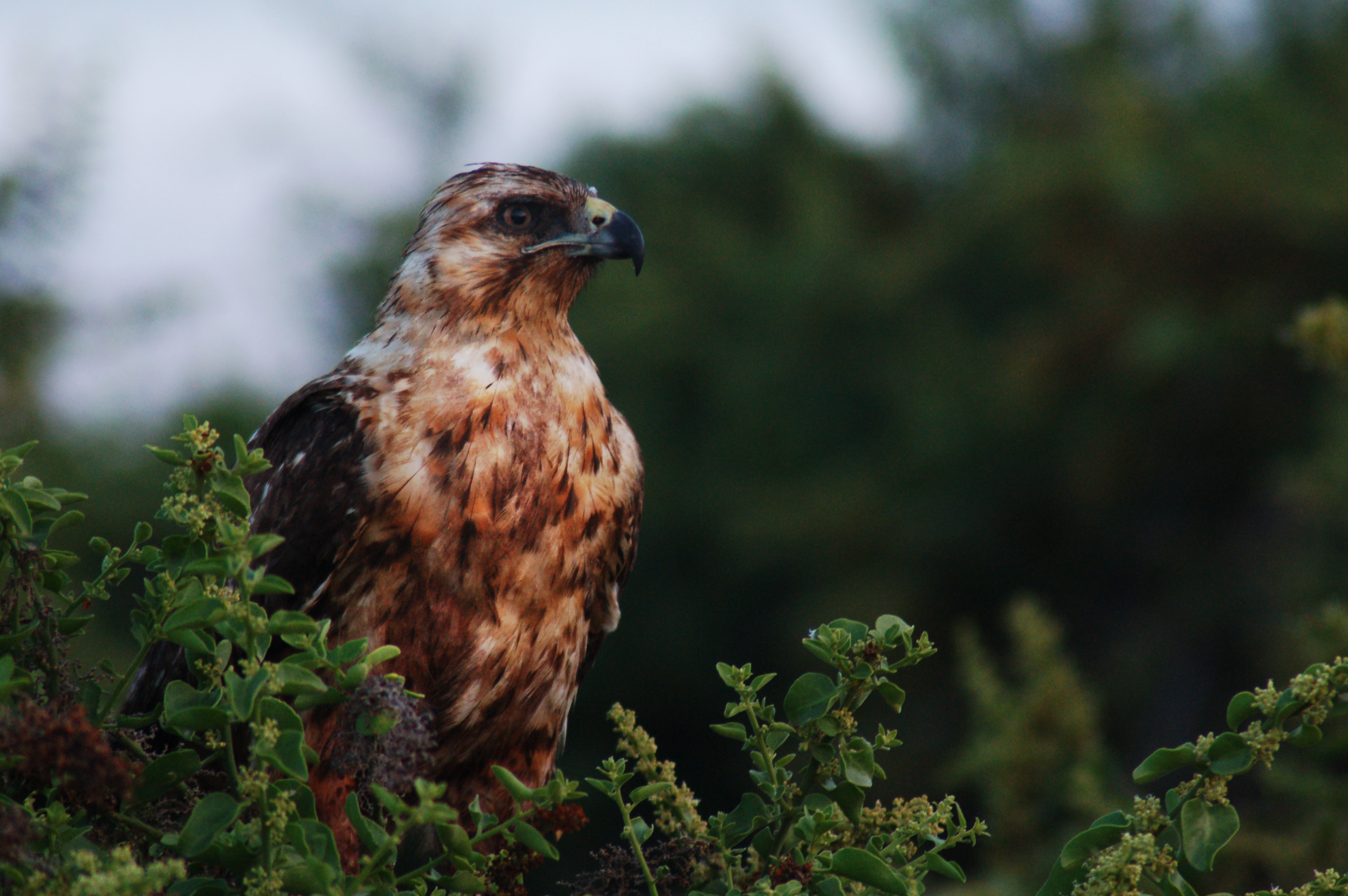
A young Galapagos hawk.

Although the exact number of these birds is unknown, there are believed to be only around 150 mating pairs in existence today. This statistic has improved slightly from past years, but it is far from the abundance they were found in on all the islands of Galápagos when they were discovered. Due to human disturbance to their natural habitat, a dwindling food supply because of new predators introduced to the islands, and persecution by humans, they are now extinct on the islands of Baltra, Daphne Major, Floreana, San Cristóbal, and North Seymour.

=== Evolution ===
The study of mtDNA haplotypes of the Galapágos hawk and its closest relative, Swainson's hawk, indicates that the former's ancestors colonized the islands approximately 300,000 years ago, making the birds the most recent native species arrival known. By contrast, Darwin's finches are estimated to have arrived some 2–3 million years ago.
