= South Plaza Island =

Island in the Galápagos Archipelago

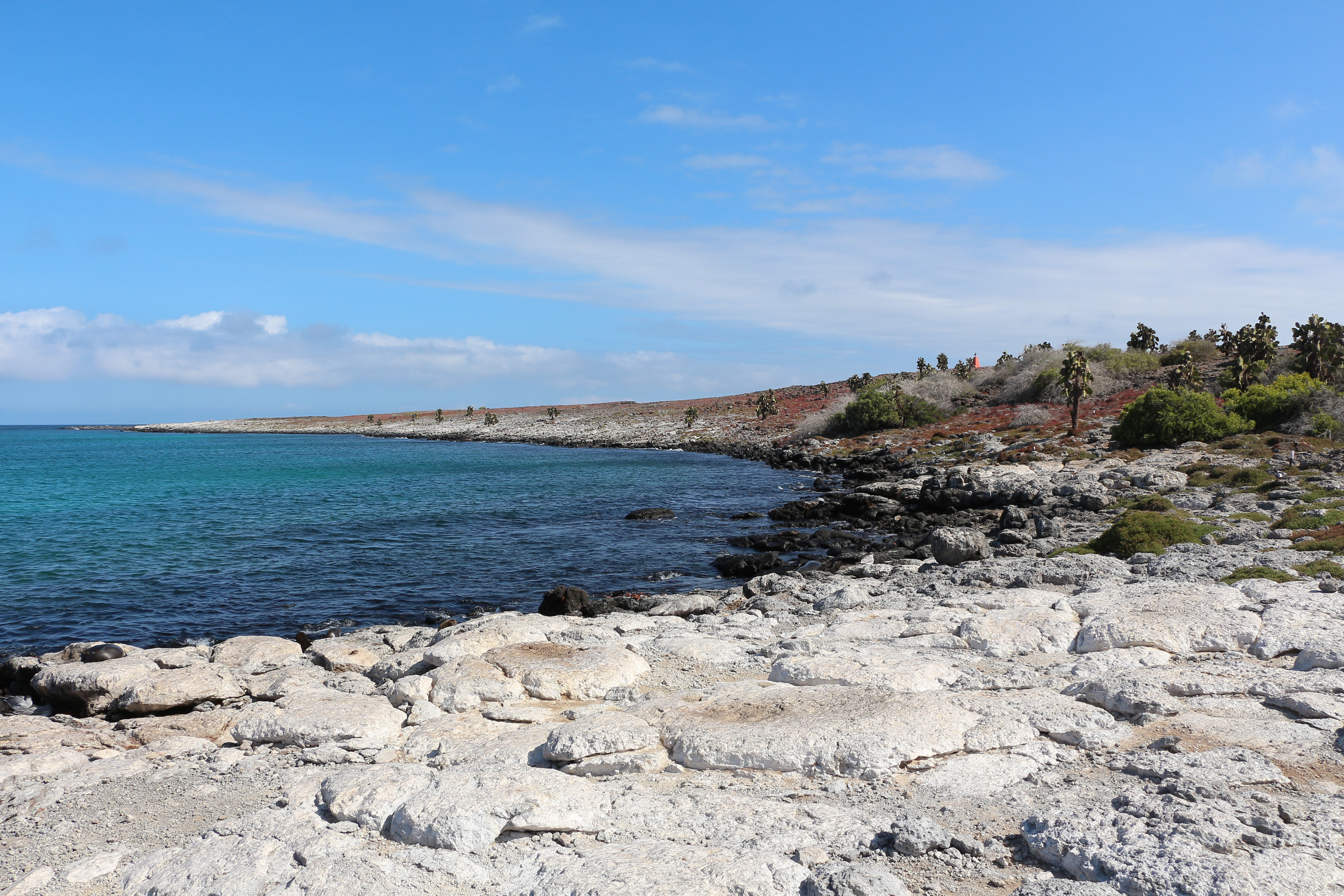
- The shoreline of South Plaza Island
- Interactive map of South Plaza Island

Geography
- Location: Pacific Ocean
- Coordinates: 0°35′0″S 90°9′45″W
- Archipelago: Galápagos Islands
- Highest elevation: 23 m (75 ft)

Administration
- Ecuador
- Province: Galápagos Province

Demographics
- Population: 0

Additional information
- Time zone: GALT (UTC-6)

South Plaza (Spanish: Isla Plaza Sur) is a small island off the east coast of Santa Cruz in the Galápagos Islands. Described as having a crescent-shaped structure, the island has cliffs on the south side and low-lying shores on the north side. Multiple species of flora such as Sesuvium and prickly pear cactus trees and fauna such as Galápagos land iguanas and sea lions can be seen on the island. Although small in size, it remains as a popular tourist destination.

== Geography and status ==
South Plaza is a small island off the east coast of Santa Cruz in the Galápagos Islands. Alongside the North Plaza Island, it is described as moon-shaped or crescent-shaped. It has an area of about 0.16 square kilometres (0.062 mi^{2}), has an elevation of about 23 metres (75 ft), and was formed by lava up streaming from the bottom of the ocean (uplifted seabed). Due to his formation by lava, it has cliffs on the south side and low-lying shores on the north side.

== Flora and fauna ==
The sea bluffs hold large numbers of birds, such as nesting red-billed tropicbirds and swallow-tailed gulls. A large amount of prickly pear cactus trees (Opuntia galapageia) can be seen, which serves as the main food for a large colony of Galápagos land iguanas endemic only to the island. Furthermore, the territory and breeding season of the Galapagos land iguana overlap only on South Plaza Island with those of the marine iguana, giving rise to a unique population of hybrid iguanas. Depending on the season, the Sesuvium ground vegetation changes its colour from green in the rainy season to orange and purple in the dry season. An approximate amount of 1000 sea lions also inhabit the island.

The cactus population on the island declined, possibly due to introduced rats. In 2012, all of the rats on the island were eradicated and the restoration of the cacti was started.

== Tourism ==
Although South Plaza Island is small in size, it is a popular tourist destination. It is the only Plaza Island that is a tourist site as North Plaza Island is restricted for visitors aside from researchers. Tourists often visit for the flora and fauna seen on the island.
