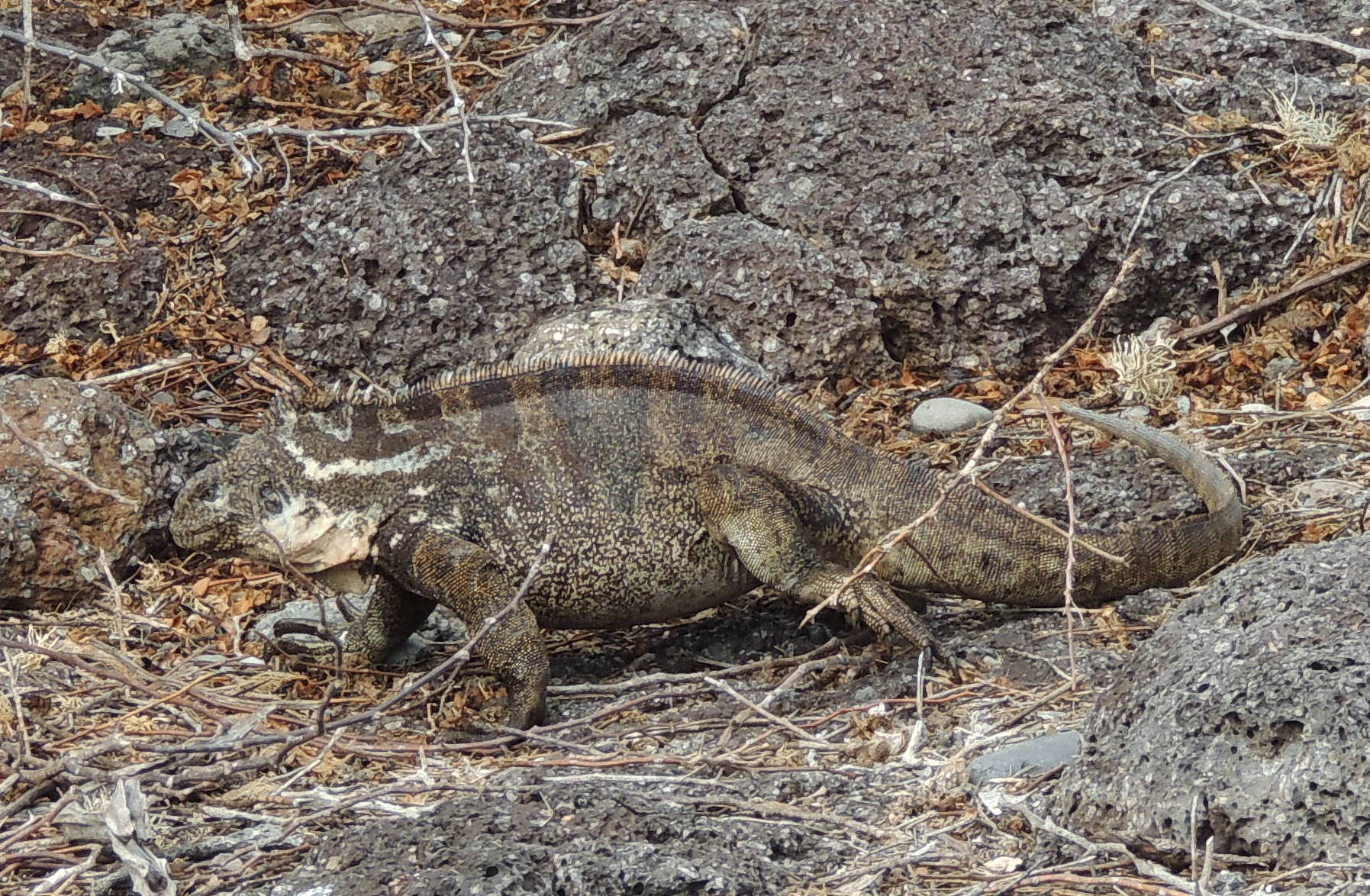
- Hybrid iguana near the boat landing on South Plaza Island

Scientific classification
- Kingdom: Animalia
- Phylum: Chordata
- Class: Reptilia
- Order: Squamata
- Suborder: Iguania
- Infraorder: Pleurodonta
- Family: Iguanidae
- Hybrid: Amblyrhynchus cristatus × Conolophus subcristatus

= Hybrid iguana =

Hybrid lizard

The hybrid iguana is a first-generation hybrid, the result of intergeneric breeding between a male marine iguana (Amblyrhynchus cristatus) and a female Galapagos land iguana (Conolophus subcristatus) on South Plaza Island in the Galápagos Islands, where the territories of the two species overlap.

Hybrid iguanas are dark with light speckles or bands of mottling near the head and a banded body. By contrast, marine iguanas are a solid blackish color, while land iguanas are reddish-yellow; neither are banded.

The first hybrid iguana was discovered in 1981. In 1997, high ocean temperatures during a severe El Niño season caused failure of the seaweed beds around the Galapagos Islands and about half the marine iguanas starved to death. Others searched inland for plants to eat. There they mated with the land iguanas, producing an unusual number of hybrid iguanas. As of 2003, 20 had been found. Four were known to be alive as of a 2013 census. DNA testing by a German researcher revealed that marine iguanas were the fathers and land iguanas the mothers.

A unique set of circumstances on South Plaza Island helps explain why the hybrid iguanas have been observed only there. Elsewhere in the Galápagos, reproductive isolation between the two species is maintained by separation of breeding in both place and time: there is little overlap between the inland habitat favored by the land iguanas and the coastal habitat of the marine iguana, and the short breeding seasons of the two species normally do not overlap. However, long, narrow South Plaza Island is so small that no place on it is far from the coast, leaving female land iguanas no place to retreat from invasion by the larger, more aggressive male marine iguanas. And on South Plaza there is a slight overlap between the end of the land iguana's breeding season and the beginning of the marine iguana's, so that male marine iguanas forced inland by hunger may occasionally encounter a female land iguana that is still in breeding condition.

== Anatomy and morphology ==
Marine iguanas have sharp claws and are able to grip rock under seawater and eat seaweed, whereas land iguanas lack sharp claws, making them unable to climb the cacti that are their staple foods. Hybrid iguanas have sharp claws and can climb on cacti and also eat seaweed underwater. The hybrid iguana can survive in both sea and land environments. Despite the long evolutionary separation between the two parent species, which are assigned to different genera, the offspring are viable, although likely sterile. The hybrid iguanas have a laterally compressed tail like that of the marine iguanas, though they have not been seen swimming. They also have sharp claws like their marine fathers, which enable them to climb for food rather than waiting for it to drop from a cactus as the land iguanas do.
