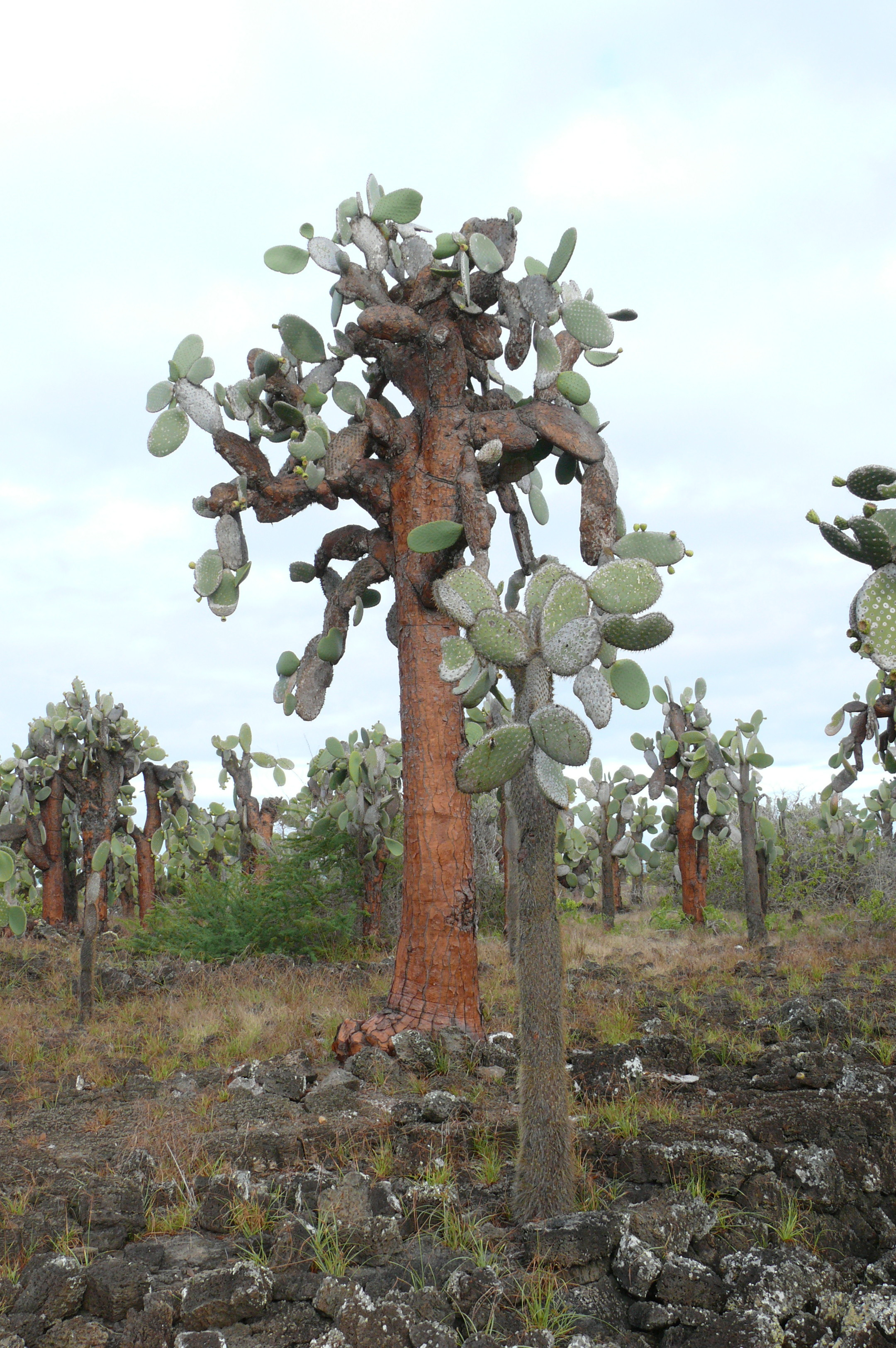

Conservation status
- Least Concern (IUCN 3.1)

Scientific classification
- Kingdom: Plantae
- Clade: Tracheophytes
- Clade: Angiosperms
- Clade: Eudicots
- Order: Caryophyllales
- Family: Cactaceae
- Genus: Opuntia
- Species: O. galapageia

Binomial name
- Opuntia galapageia Hensl.

Infraspecific taxa
- See text.

Synonyms
- Opuntia megasperma J.T.Howell; As subtaxa: Opuntia echios J.T.Howell; Opuntia helleri K.Schum.; Opuntia insularis A.Stewart; Opuntia myriacantha F.A.C.Weber; Opuntia saxicola J.T.Howell

= Opuntia galapageia =

Species of cactus

Opuntia galapageia is a species of cactus. It is endemic to the Galápagos Islands, part of Ecuador. Forms occurring on different islands have been treated as separate species and subtaxa of these species. Opuntia echios, Opuntia helleri, Opuntia insularis, Opuntia megasperma, Opuntia myriacantha and Opuntia saxicola are now sunk within O. galapageia.

== Description ==
The variety Opuntia galapageia var. myriacantha, synonym Opuntia galapageia var. echios, has one of the longest spine lengths: up to 25 cm (10 in) in length, exceeded only by Ferocactus emoryi ssp. rectispinus at 33 cm (13 in).

== Taxonomy ==
Opuntia galapageia was first described by John Stevens Henslow in 1837. It was first recorded by Charles Darwin on Santiago (James) Island. Darwin was ashore there for nine days in 1835. Subsequently, at least five other species of Opuntia were described from the Galápagos: Opuntia helleri, Opuntia insularis, Opuntia megasperma, Opuntia myriacantha and Opuntia saxicola. All were treated by David Hunt in 2006 as included within O. galapageia, a placement accepted by the IUCN Red List as of 2017, although they had been assessed as separate species in 2000. Plants of the World Online also accepts the placement within O. galapageia, and includes Opuntia echios, in most cases placing the species in an infraspecific taxon (see the list below).

=== Infraspecific taxa ===
A large number of varieties and other infraspecific taxa have been named. As of June 2021, Plants of the World Online accepts the following:

Image	Name	Distribution
	Opuntia galapageia subvar. barringtonensis (E.Y.Dawson) Backeb., syn. Opuntia echios var. barringtonensis E.Y.Dawson	Santa Fe This is the stoutest variety, with a trunk up to 1.25 m (4 ft 1 in) DBH.
	Opuntia galapageia var. gigantea (J.T.Howell) Backeb., syns. Opuntia echios var. gigantea (J.T.Howell) D.M.Porter, Opuntia echios subsp. gigantea J.T.Howell	Santa Cruz Tallest form; up to 12 m (39 ft).
	Opuntia galapageia var. helleri (K.Schum. ex B.L.Rob.) Backeb., syn. Opuntia helleri K.Schum.	Darwin, Genovesa, Marchena, Wolf
	Opuntia galapageia subvar. inermis (E.Y.Dawson) Backeb., syn. Opuntia echios var. inermis E.Y.Dawson	Isabela
	Opuntia galapageia var. insularis (A.Stewart) Backeb., syn. Opuntia insularis A.Stewart	Fernandina, Isabela
	Opuntia galapageia var. macrocarpa E.Y.Dawson	Pinzon
	Opuntia galapageia var. myriacantha (F.A.C.Weber) Backeb., syns. Opuntia echios, Opuntia myriacantha F.A.C.Weber	
	Opuntia galapageia var. profusa E.F.Anderson & Walk.	Isabela, Santiago
	Opuntia galapageia var. saxicola (J.T.Howell) Backeb., syn. Opuntia saxicola J.T.Howell	Isabela
	Opuntia galapageia var. zacana (J.T.Howell) Backeb., syns. Opuntia zacana J.T.Howell, Opuntia echios var. zacana (J.T.Howell) Backeb.	North Seymour

Two other infraspecific taxa that have been named are not recognized by Plants of the World Online as distinct from the species:

- Opuntia galapageia var. brossettii Backeb.
- Opuntia galapageia subvar. orientalis (J.T.Howell) Backeb.

== Distribution ==
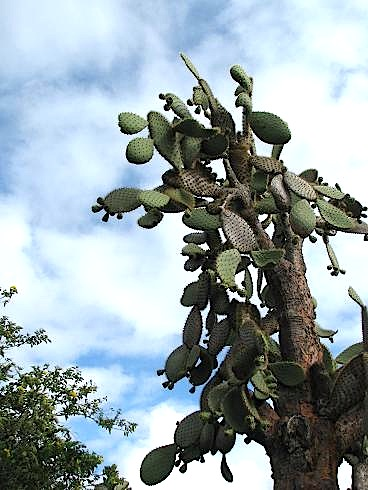

Opuntia galapageia is endemic to the Galápagos Islands. Forms occurring on different islands have been described as subtaxa of the species (see the list above). Island distributions given by Plants of the World Online include:

- Fernandina
  - O. galapageia var. insularis
- Isabela
  - O. galapageia subvar. inermis
  - O. galapageia var. insularis
  - O. galapageia var. profusa
  - O. galapageia var. saxicola
- Seymour
  - O. galapageia var. zacana
- Pinzon
  - O. galapageia var. macrocarpa
- Santa Cruz
  - O. galapageia var. gigantea
- Santa Fe
  - O. galapageia subvar. barringtonensis
- Santiago
  - O. galapageia var. profusa
