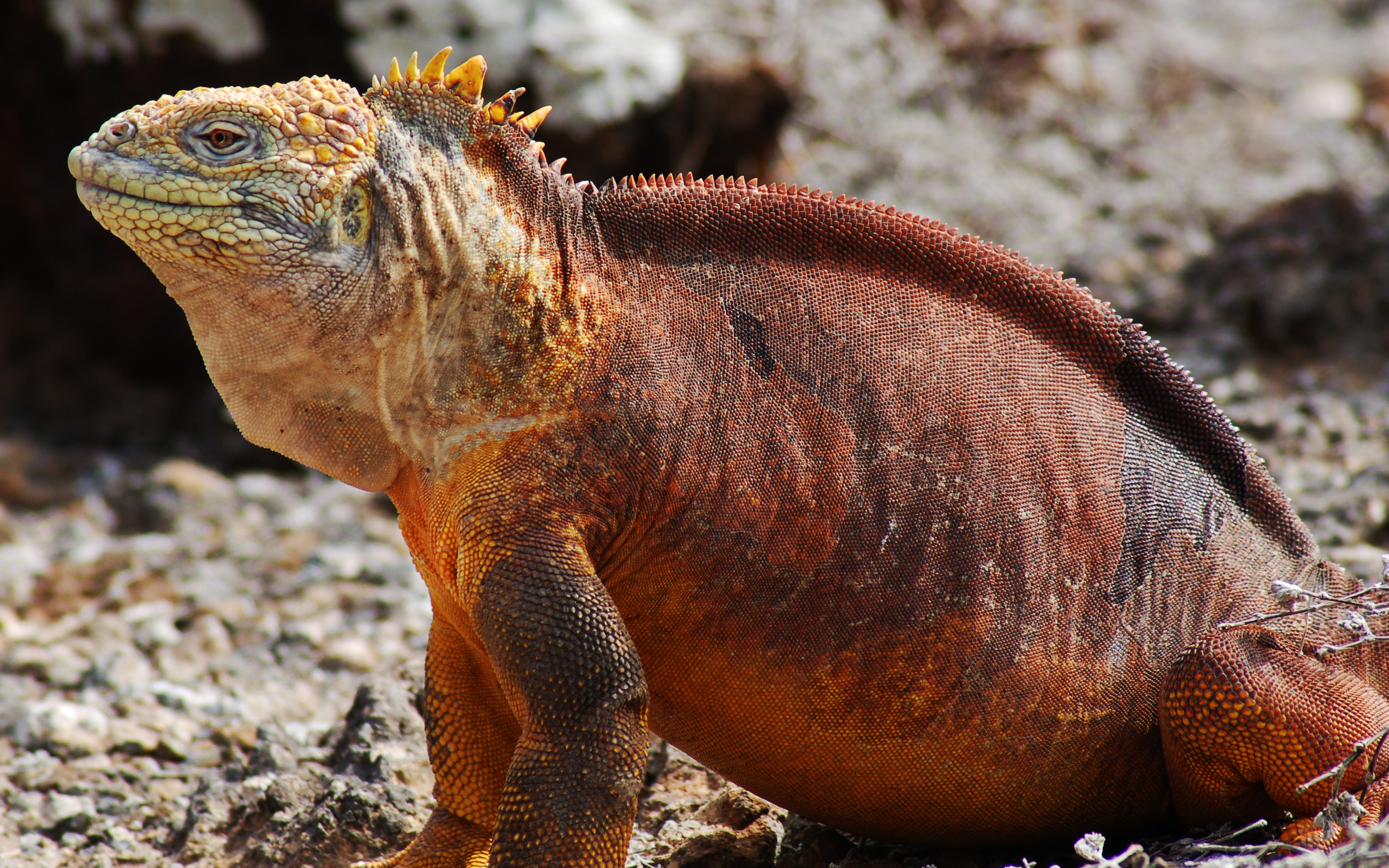

Conservation status
- Vulnerable (IUCN 3.1)
- CITES Appendix II

Scientific classification
- Kingdom: Animalia
- Phylum: Chordata
- Class: Reptilia
- Order: Squamata
- Suborder: Iguania
- Family: Iguanidae
- Genus: Conolophus
- Species: C. subcristatus

Binomial name
- Conolophus subcristatus (Gray, 1831)

Synonyms
- Amblyrynchus subcristatus Gray, 1831; Trachycephalus subcristatus (Gray, 1831); Amblyrhynchus demarlii A.M.C. Duméril & Bibron, 1837; Hypsilophus (Conolophus) demarlii (A.M.C. Duméril & Bibron, 1837)

= Galápagos land iguana =

Galápagos land iguana Temporal range: Miocene

Species of lizard

The Galápagos land iguana (Conolophus subcristatus) is a very large species of lizard in the family Iguanidae, and one of three species of the genus Conolophus. It is endemic to the Galápagos Islands off of Ecuador's Pacific coast, inhabiting the dry lowlands of Fernandina, Isabela, Santa Cruz, North Seymour, Baltra, and South Plaza islands.

== Taxonomy and etymology ==
The land iguanas of the Galápagos islands (genus Conolophus) vary in morphology and coloration among different populations. In addition to the relatively widespread, well-known Galápagos land iguana (C. subcristatus), there are two other species within Conolophus: the Galápagos pink land iguana (C. marthae), of northern Isabela Island; and the Santa Fe land iguana (C. pallidus), of Santa Fe Island. Based on mtDNA, the ancestors of today's land iguanas and marine iguanas (Amblyrhynchus cristatus) separated about 8–10 million years ago (MYA). Within the land iguana genus, the oldest split (based on mtDNA—about 5.7 MYA) is between C. subcristatus and C. marthae. A more-recent study, which included both mtDNA and nuclear DNA, indicated that the marine iguana split from the land iguana about 4.5 MYA; among the land iguanas, C. subcristatus and C. marthae split from each other about 1.5 MYA. The differentiation between C. subcristatus and C. pallidus is less clear; it has been questioned whether they are separate species. Based on mtDNA and cytochrome b, they fall into three monophyletic groups: C. subcristatus of the western islands (Isabela and Fernandina), C. subcristatus of the central islands (Santa Cruz, Baltra and South Plaza), and C. pallidus. Although the exact pattern is uncertain, it is possible that C. pallidus is closer to one of the C. subcristatus groups than the two C. subcristatus groups are to each other.

The specific name subcristatus is derived from the Latin words sub (meaning "lesser"):and cristatus (meaning "crested"), and refers to the low crest of spines along the animal's back, which is not as tall as in other iguanas, like the green iguana (Iguana iguana).

== Anatomy and morphology ==
Charles Darwin described the Galápagos land iguanas he observed as "ugly animals, of a yellowish orange beneath, and of a brownish-red colour above: from their low facial angle they have a singularly stupid appearance."

The Galápagos land iguana is one of the largest lizards in the world, growing to a length of 0.9 to 1.5 m (3–5 ft), with a body weight of up to 13 kg (29 lb), depending upon which island they are from. Being cold-blooded, they raise their body temperature by basking on volcanic rock or other dark-colored stones that naturally absorb the heat of the sun. By night, they sleep in burrows to conserve their absorbed body heat. These iguanas also enjoy a symbiotic relationship with birds; the birds remove parasites, such as ticks, providing relief to the iguanas and food for the birds.

== Diet ==
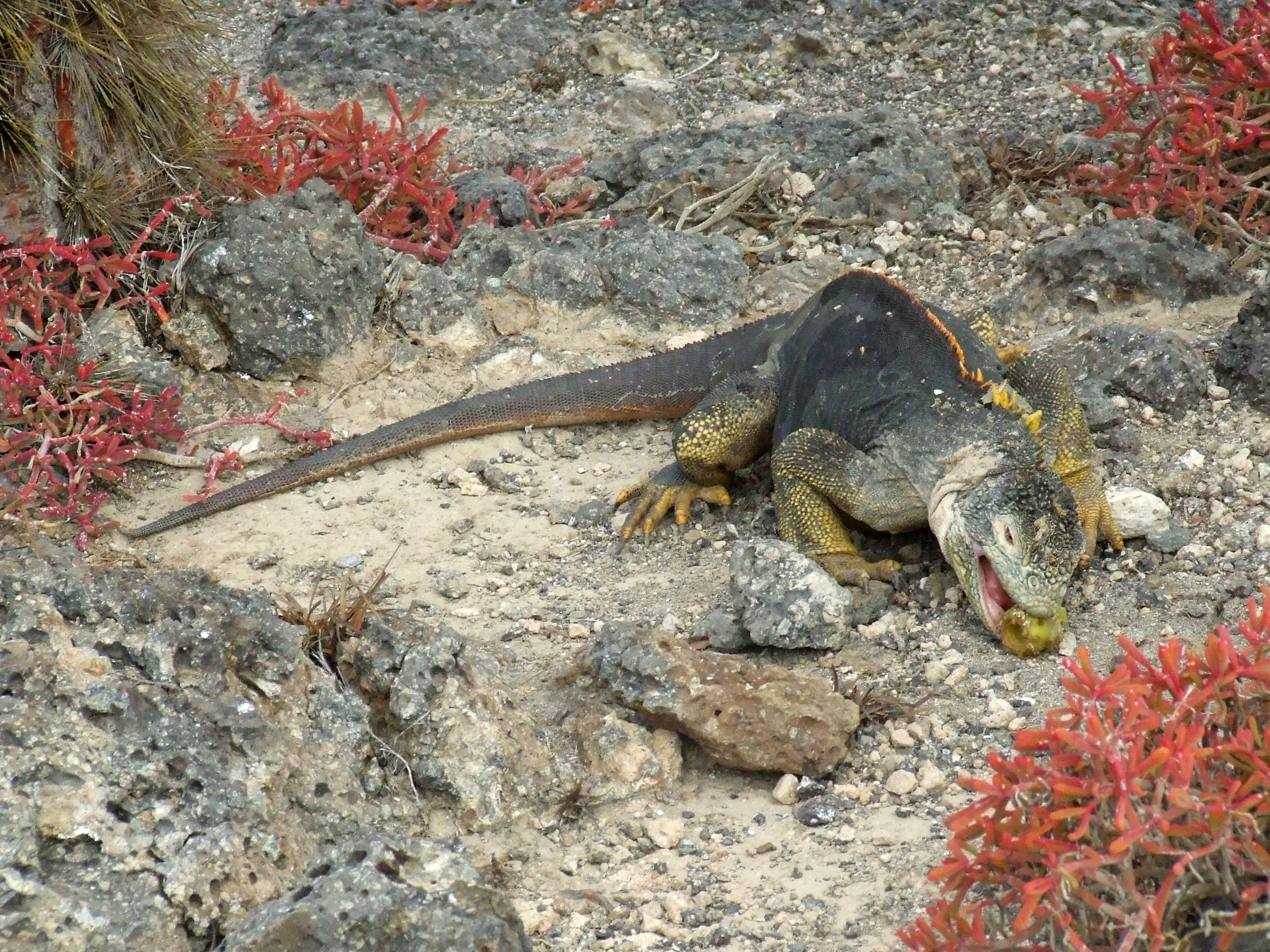
Feeding

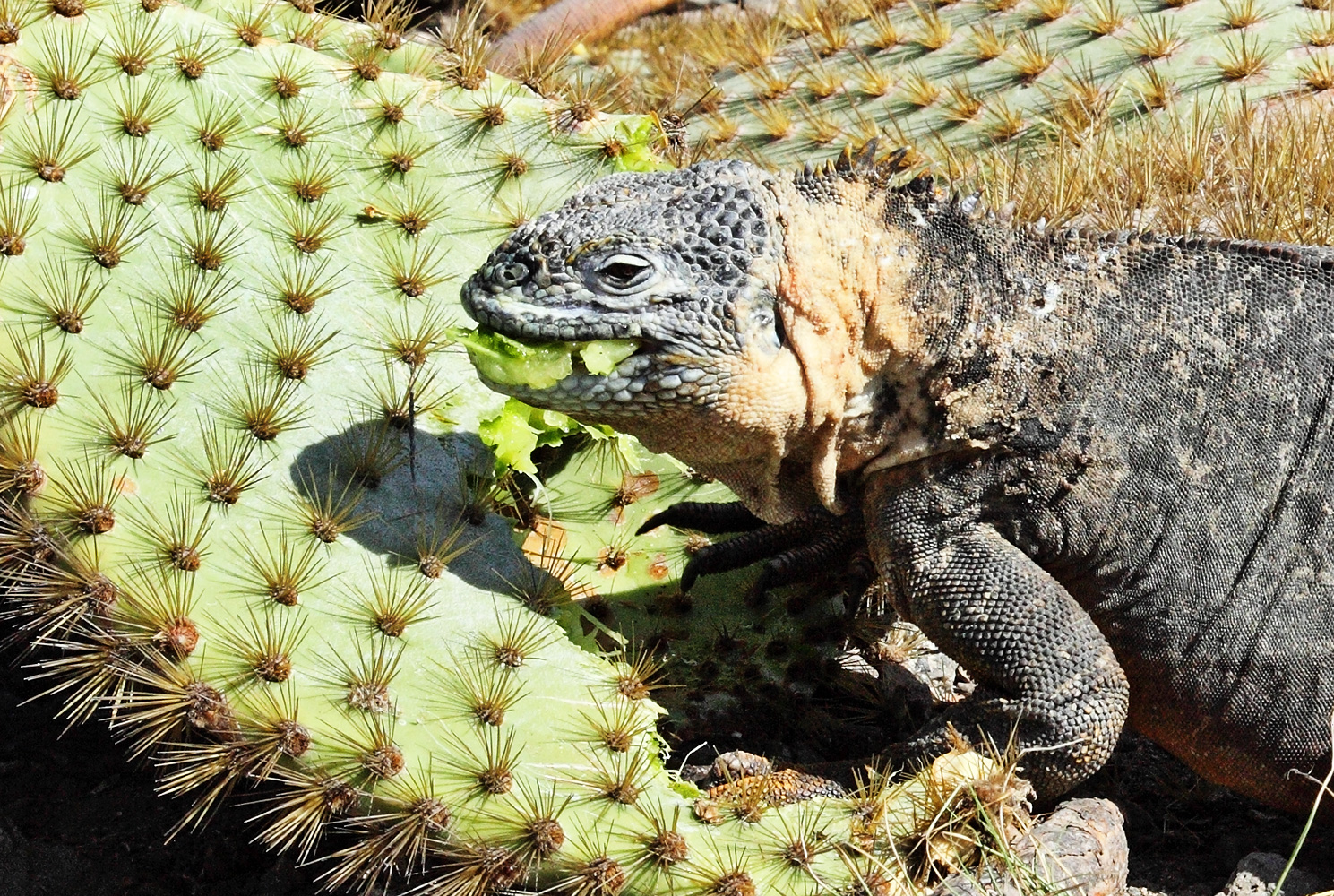
Feeding on fallen cactus pads

The Galápagos land iguana is primarily herbivorous; however, some individuals have shown that they are opportunistic omnivores, supplementing their diet with invertebrates, such as centipedes or arachnids, and carrion. Because fresh water is scarce on the islands, the Galápagos land iguana obtains the bulk of its moisture from the prickly-pear cactus (Opuntia sp.), in addition to other Cactaceae species, which makes up nearly 80% of its diet. All parts of the plant are consumed, including the fruit, flowers, pads, and even the sharp spines. During the rainy season, the Galápagos land iguana will drink from temporary vernal pools and other accumulated sources of water, and feast on the blousy, yellow flowers of the perennial succulent genus Portulaca.

== Longevity ==
The Galápagos land iguana has a lifespan of 60–69 years.

== Reproduction ==
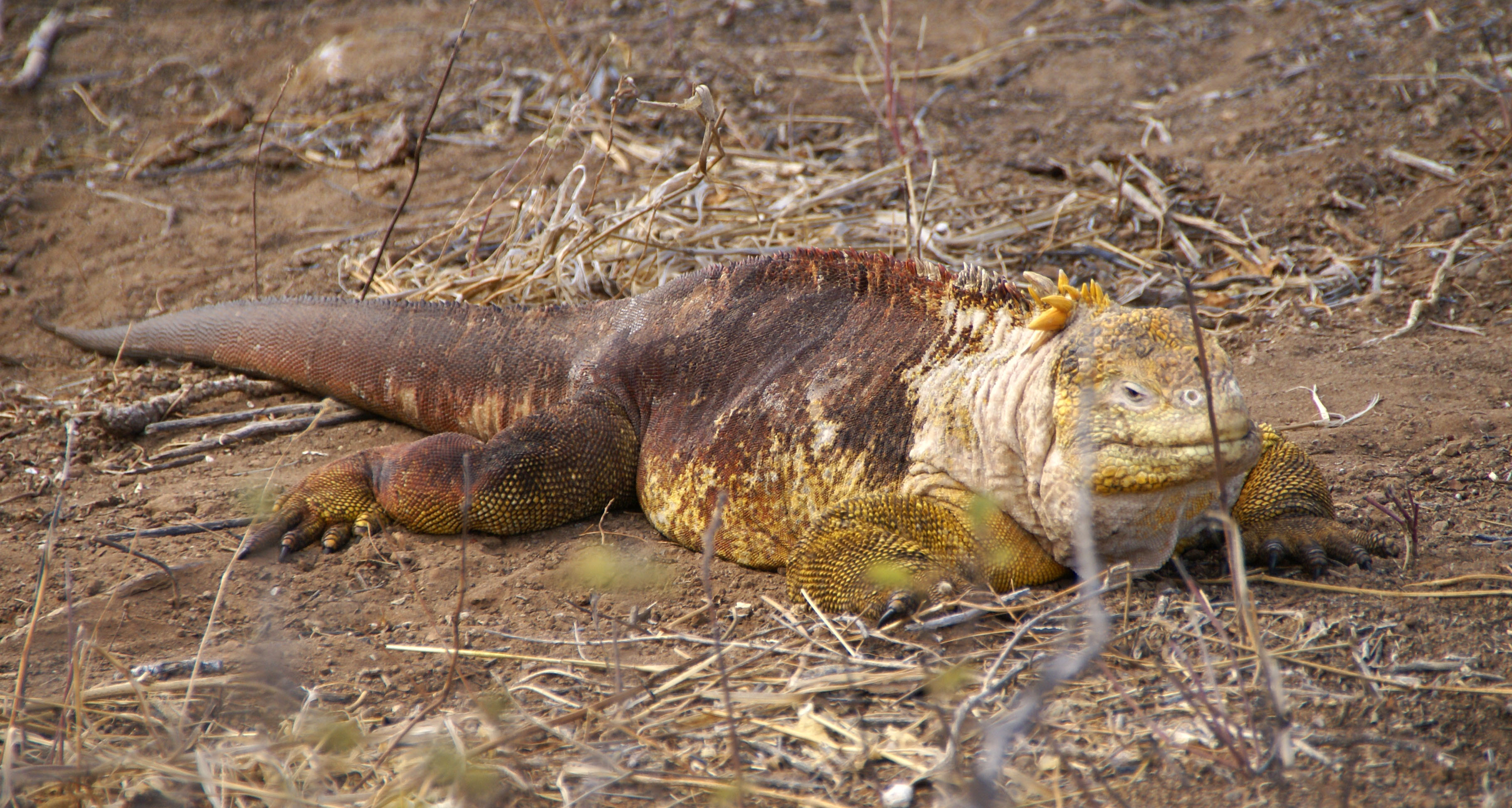
Basking

Galápagos land iguanas become sexually mature anywhere between eight and fifteen years of age, depending on which island they are from. Mating season also varies between islands, but soon after mating, the females migrate to sandy areas to nest, laying 2–20 eggs in a burrow about 50 cm (20 in) deep. The eggs hatch anywhere from 90 to 125 days later.

On South Plaza Island, where the territories of marine iguanas and land iguanas overlap, the two sometimes interbreed, resulting in a hybrid iguana that shows a mixture of features from each species. The most likely unions tend to be between male marine iguanas and female land iguanas. Despite their long separation time and their being two distinct species from different genera, the offspring are viable, although likely sterile.

== Population ==
It is estimated that between 5,000 and 10,000 of the Galápagos land iguana are found throughout the Galápagos Islands. This species of iguana was so abundant on Santiago Island at one time that naturalist Charles Darwin remarked (when it was called King James Island) that "... when we were left at James, we could not for some time find a spot free from their burrows on which to pitch our single tent". In the years since, entire populations (including all the animals on Santiago Island) have been wiped out by introduced feral animals, such as pigs, rats, cats, and dogs.

== Evolutionary history ==
Researchers theorize that Galápagos land iguanas (genus Conolophus) and the marine iguana (genus Amblyrhynchus) evolved from a common ancestor since arriving on the islands from South America, presumably by rafting. The marine iguana diverged from the land iguanas some 8 million years ago, which is older than any of the extant Galápagos islands. It is therefore thought that the ancestral species inhabited parts of the volcanic archipelago that are now submerged. The two species remain mutually fertile in spite of being assigned to distinct genera, and they occasionally hybridize where their ranges overlap.

== Recovery efforts ==
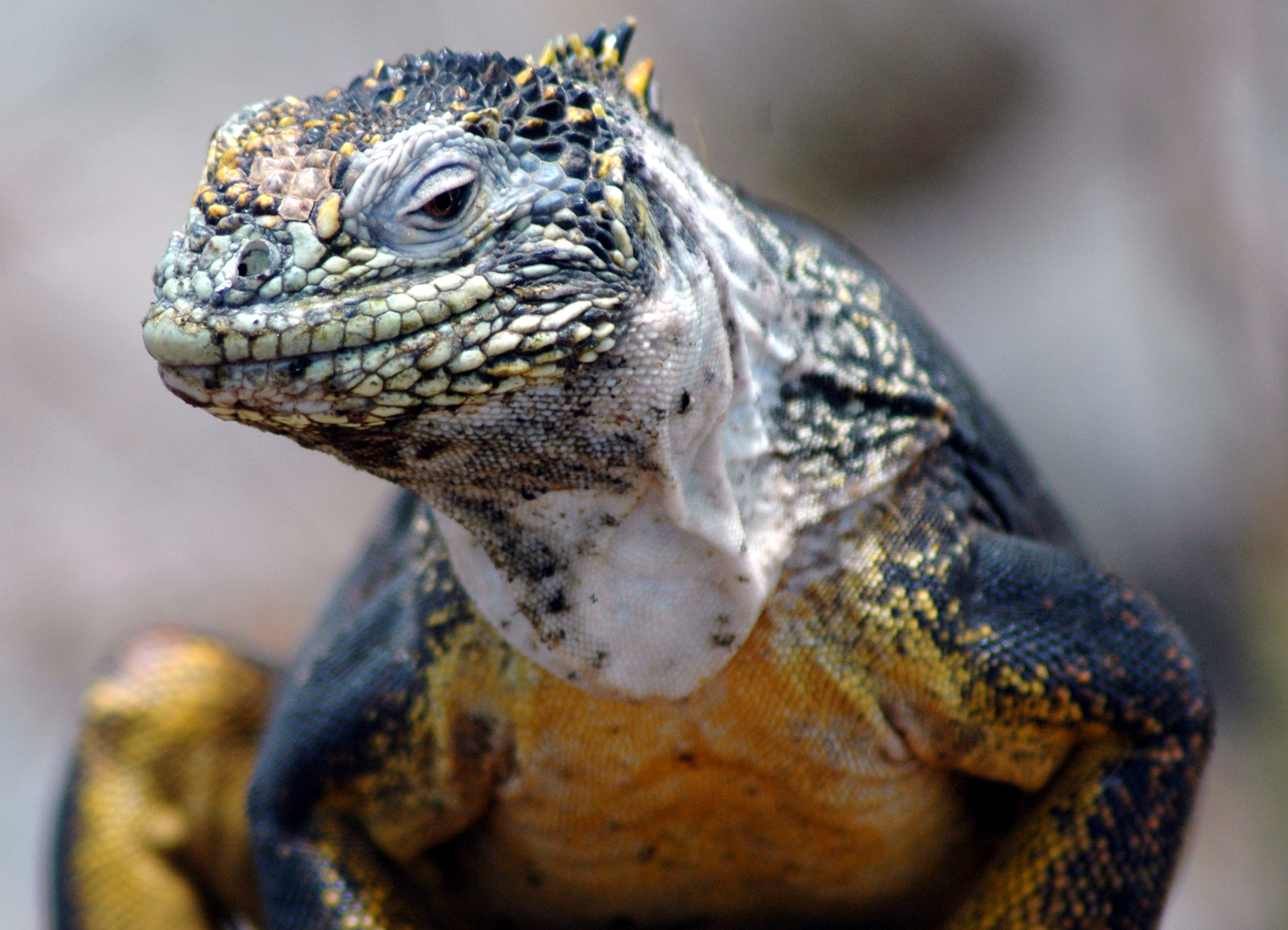
Male

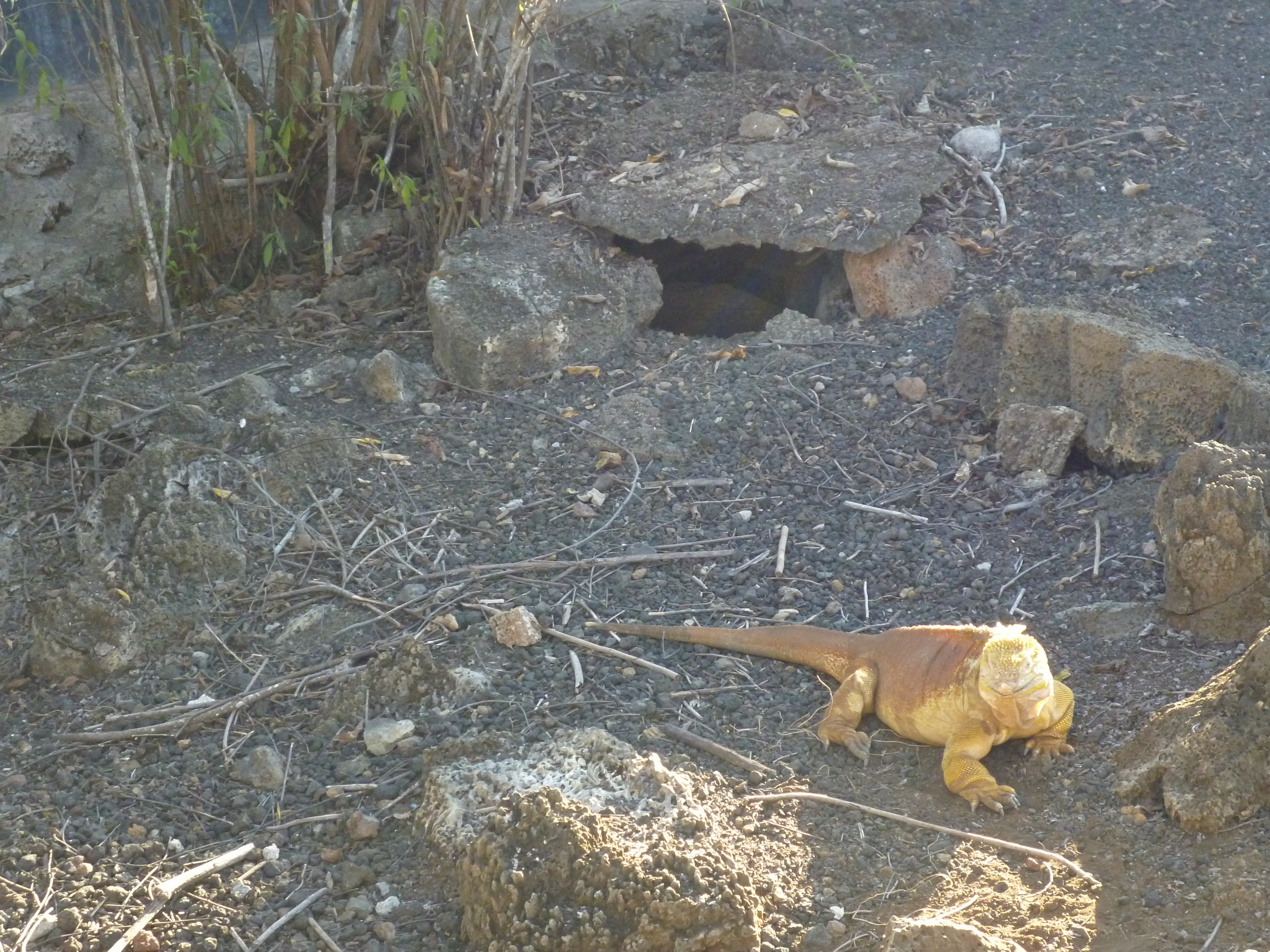
Yellow land iguana at the Charles Darwin Research Station

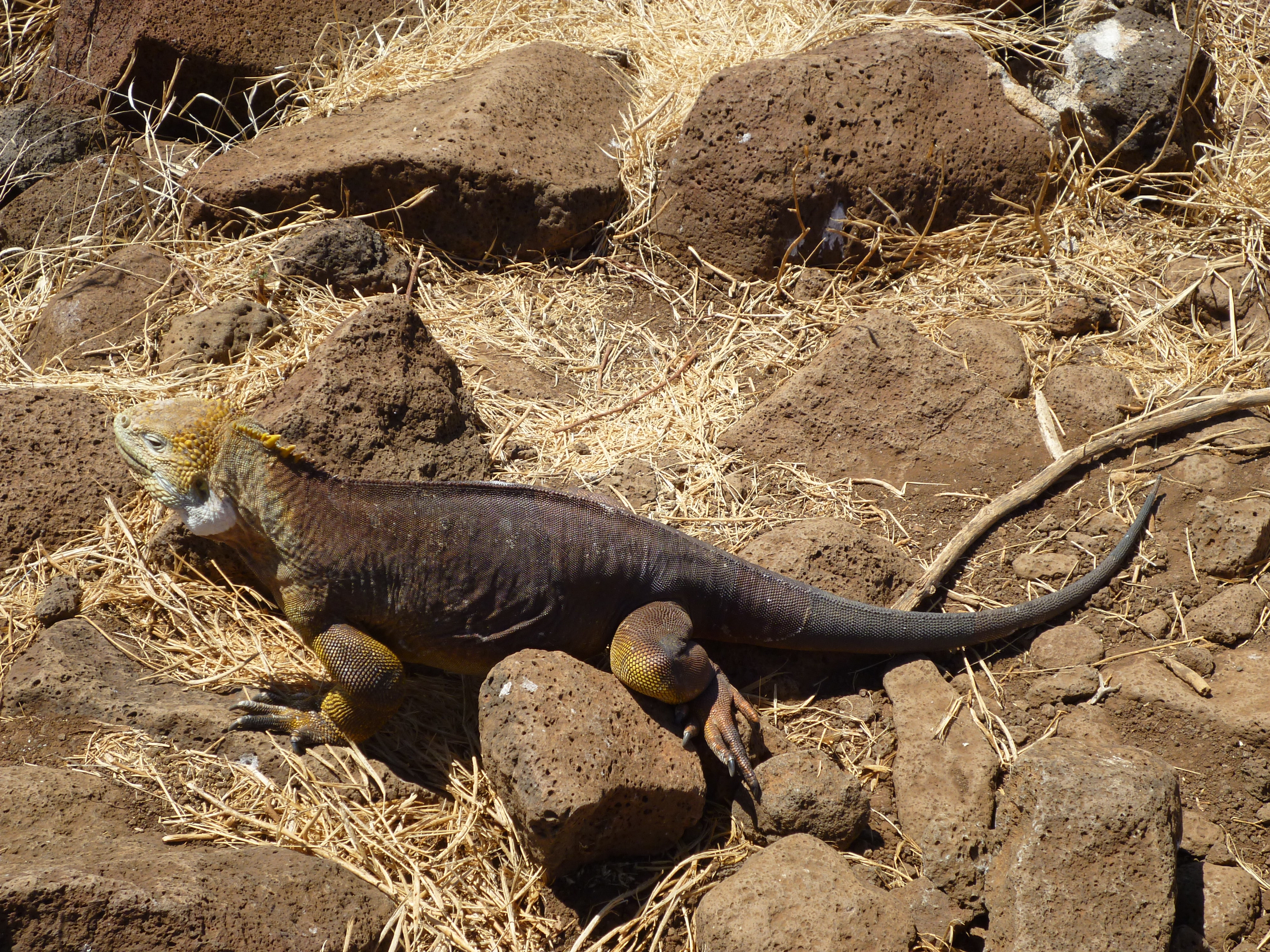
Galápagos land iguana on North Seymour Island.

In 1932, G. Allan Hancock went on a scientific expedition to the Galapagos with the intention to collect fossil mollusks for the California Academy of Sciences, live vertebrates for the San Diego Zoological Gardens and fish for the Steinhart Aquarium. Once the expedition crew of 20 officers and seven scientists reached Baltra, they noticed the Galápagos land iguana and captured the species on film. Although the population was numerous in the island, majority of the iguanas appeared emaciated. The team retrieved 15 iguanas to relocate to the Zoo.

During his visit to North Seymour Island, a smaller island just a few hundred metres north of Baltra, G. Allan Hancock observed that the environmental conditions were more propitious for the iguanas there. Thus, he serendipitously envisioned to introduce about 20 iguanas to this area and planned to revisit the site after a year. Consequently, the translocation of 40 Galápagos land iguanas from Baltra to North Seymour Island took place on Sunday, January 17, 1932. About 70 individuals were transferred to the new location by the end of the expedition.

When the team returned in 1933 they observed that the specimens released in 1932 were still in North Seymour Island and thriving in their new environment. It was also reported that the vegetation and fauna of Baltra had improved since their first visit to the island.

Decades later, during World War II, an American Airbase was established on Baltra Island, and by 1954 the Galápagos land iguana became extinct on Baltra. This is attributable to habitat destruction and predation.

The Galápagos land iguana was indigenous and endemic to Baltra, without scientific intervention, and introduction of these species to North Seymour Island, the Galápagos land iguana could have faced global extinction.

The surviving individuals from North Seymour Island became the breeding stock for the Charles Darwin Research Station captive breeding program that has successfully reintroduced the species to Baltra and several other locations. Today, visitors frequently see iguanas either on the runway at Baltra Airport or crossing nearby roads.
