= North Seymour Island =

Island in the Galápagos Archipelago

- Location within Galápagos Islands

Geography
- Location: Galápagos Islands, Ecuador
- Coordinates: 0.395592°S 90.287327°W
- Archipelago: Galápagos Islands
- Highest elevation: 28 m (92 ft)

Administration
- Ecuador

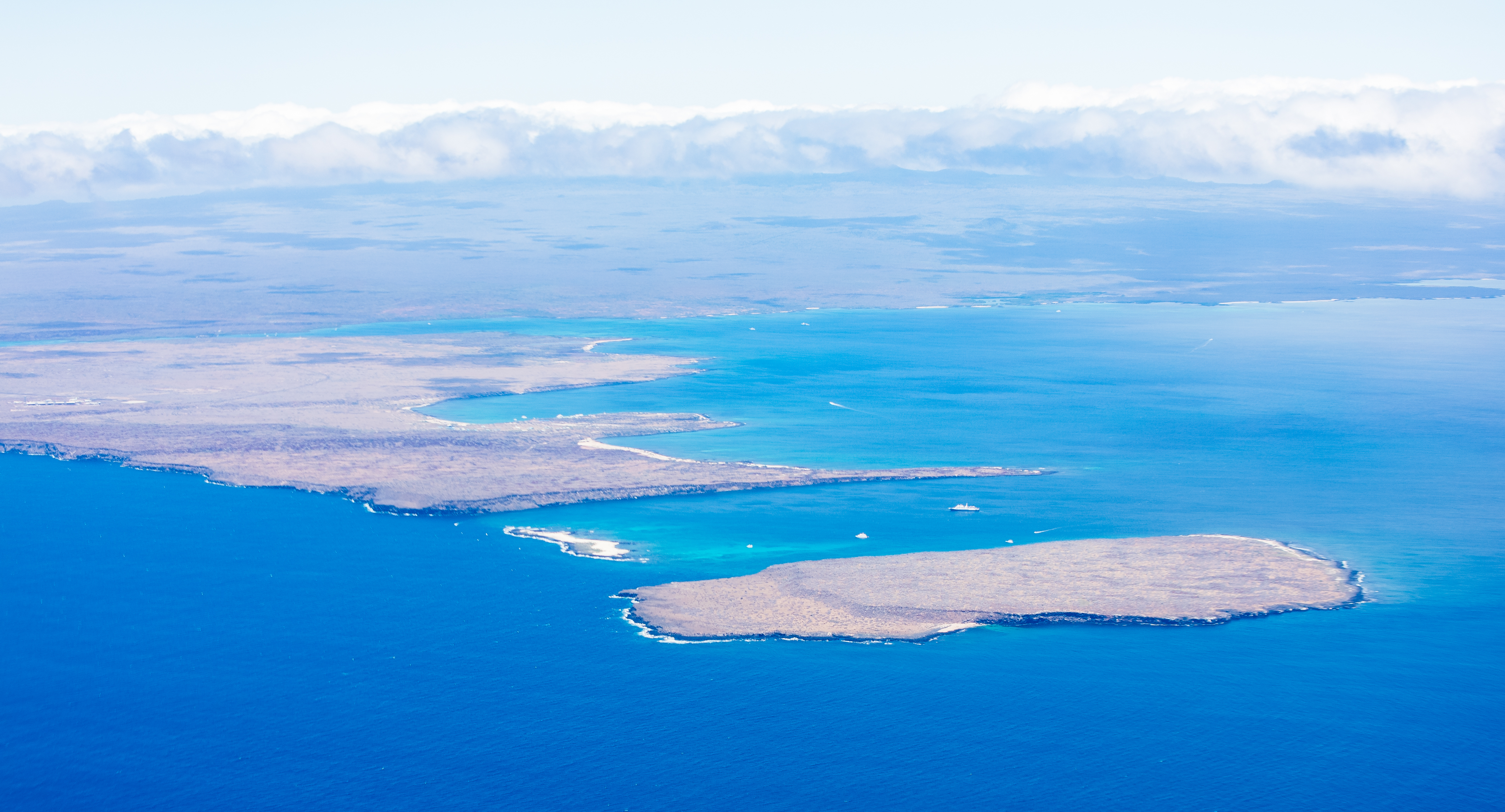
North Seymour in the foreground with Baltra (formerly South Seymour) behind it

North Seymour Island (Spanish: Isla Seymour Norte) is a small island near Baltra Island in the Galápagos Islands in Ecuador. It was formed by uplift of a submarine lava formation and is now covered with low, bushy vegetation. It has an area of 1.9 km^{2} (0.73 sq mi) and a maximum elevation of 28 meters (92 ft). There is no permanent population but a visitor trail has been established approximately 2 km (1.2 mi) in length for guided tours crossing the interior of the island and exploring the rocky coast.

== Name ==
Seymour Island was named after George Francis Seymour, Commander-in-chief of the Pacific Station (1844-1847), and was given by John James Onslow, captain of HMS Daphne (1838) which spent a month in Galapagos in February-March 1845. Its present name North Seymour distinguishes it from nearby Baltra Island, also known as South Seymour. Together with Baltra, North Seymour is considered to be part of the Seymours or the Seymour Group.

== Geography ==
North Seymour is an islet near Baltra in Ecuador's Galápagos Islands. It was formed by seismic uplift of a submarine lava formation rather than directly created by volcanism. The island has a flat profile with cliffs only a few meters from the shoreline.

== Flora ==
All of North Seymour is covered with low, bushy vegetation. A tiny forest of silver-grey Palo Santo trees stand just above the landing, usually without leaves.

== Wildlife ==
North Seymour is home to a large population of blue-footed boobies and swallow-tailed gulls. Flocks of pelicans and swallow-tailed gulls feed off shore, and seasonally, Nazca boobies can also be seen.

There is a slowly growing population of Galápagos land iguanas (Conolophus subcristatus). The stock for the captive breeding program of the Galápagos land iguana is descended from iguanas which Captain G. Allan Hancock moved from nearby Baltra Island in the 1930s. This helped preserve the species when Baltra became the site of an American airbase during World War II. The population swelled to over 5,000 by the 21st century, beginning to reach the limits of the island's food availability. The Directorate of the Galápagos National Park and Island Conservation took 1,436 of the iguanas from the North Seymour population to Santiago Island on 4 January 2019, restoring them to Santiago after a 180-year absence in an effort to restore that island's ecological health and to provide the both groups of iguanas more resources to thrive. Darwin had noted Santiago's iguanas in 1835, but they were last found there by Abel-Nicolas Bergasse du Petit-Thouars in 1838.

On January 12, 2019, the park directorate began using aerial drones to eradicate black and brown rats (Rattus rattus and R. norvegicus) from North Seymour, the first time such an approach had been used on vertebrates in the wild. The expectation is that this innovation will pave the way for faster and cheaper eradications of invasive species in the future on small and mid-sized islands.

== Gallery ==
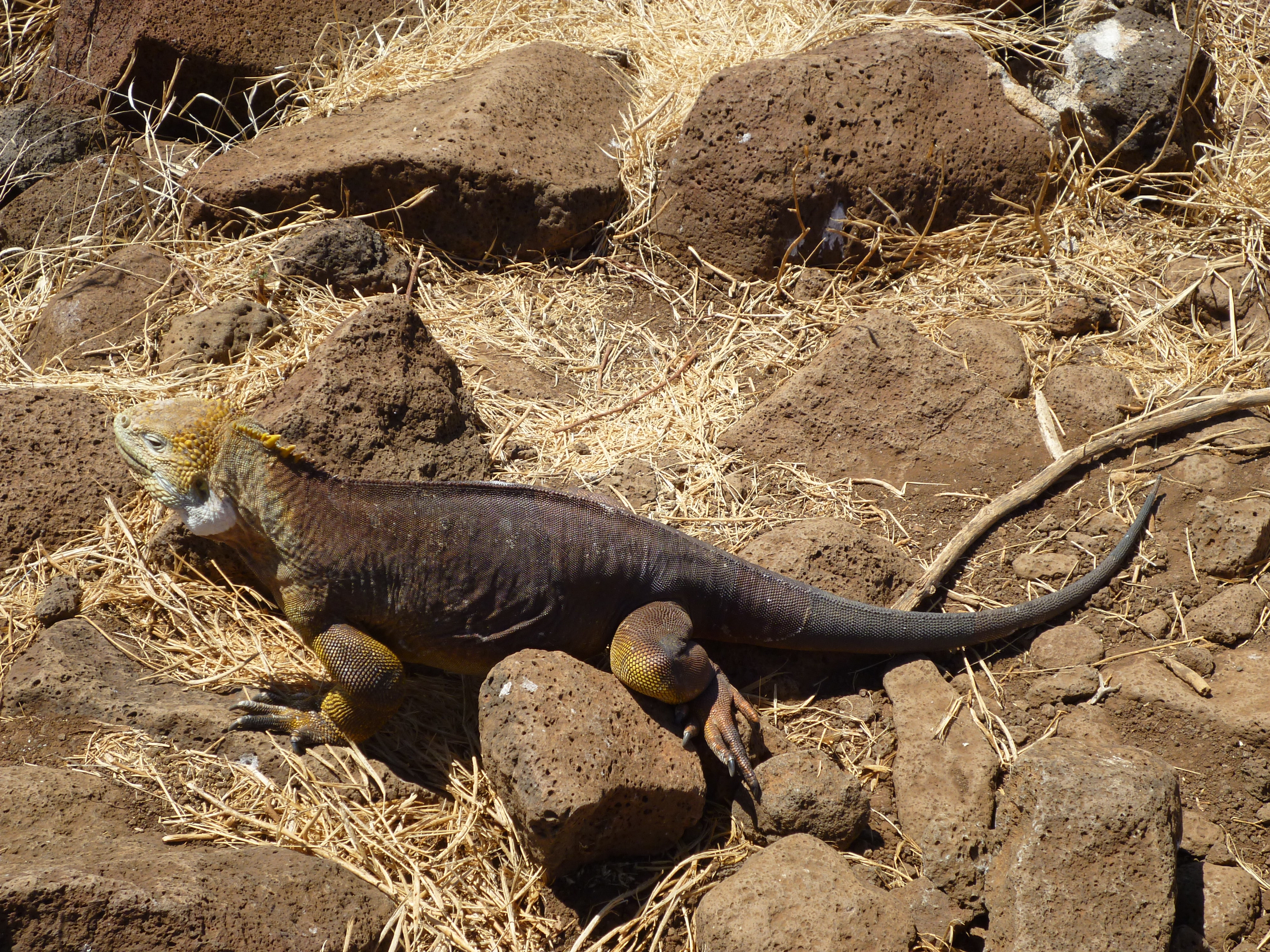
A Galápagos land iguana on the North Seymour Island in the Galápagos

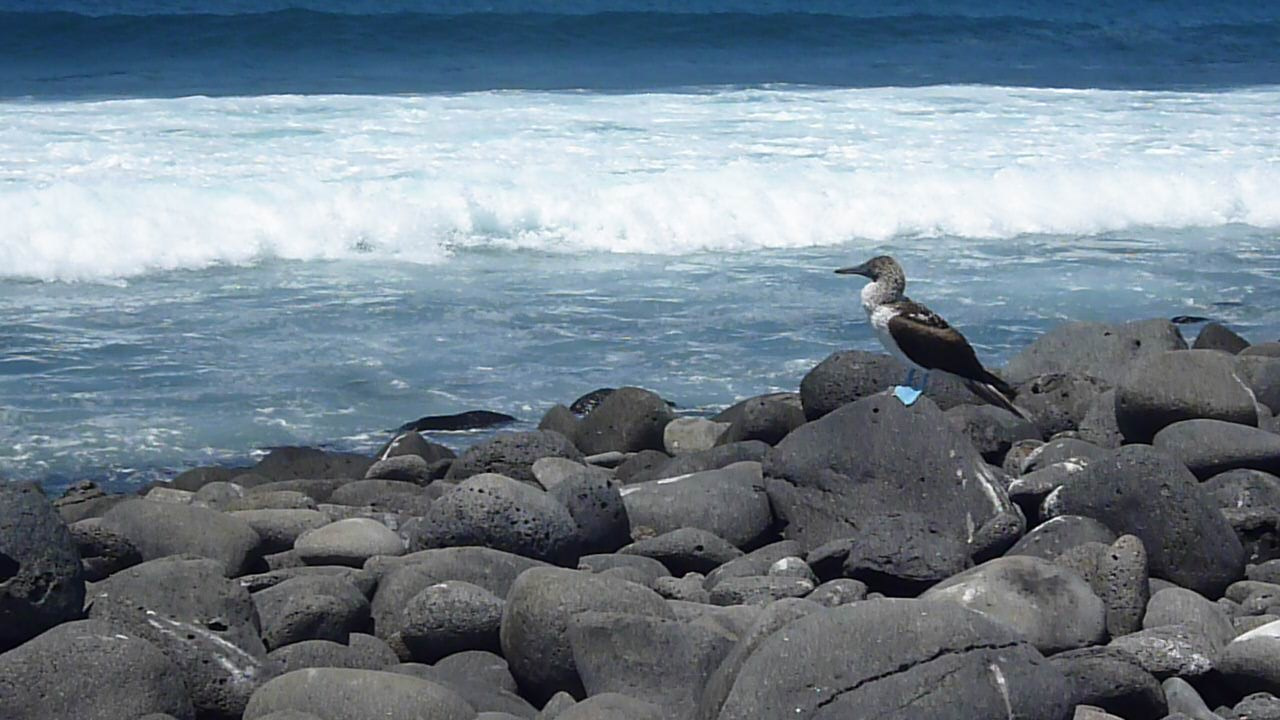
(Sula nebouxii) blue footed booby on North Seymour Island Galápagos

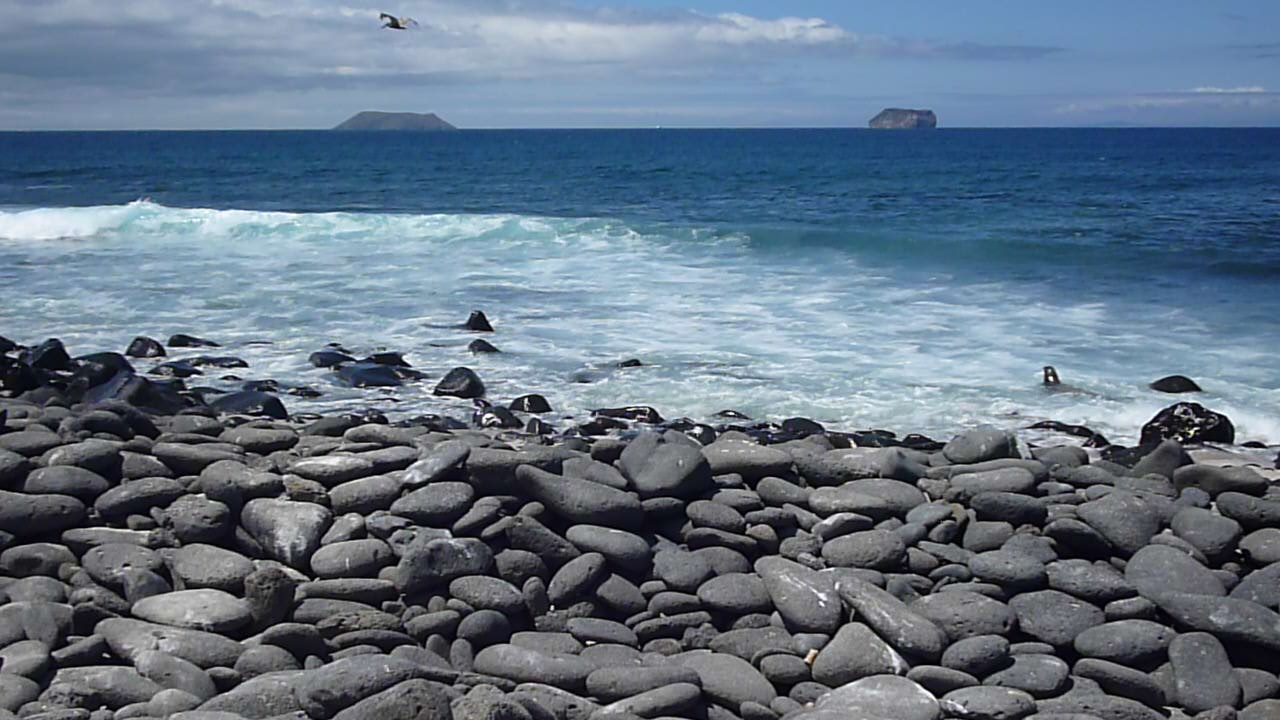
Beach in North Seymour Island, Galápagos

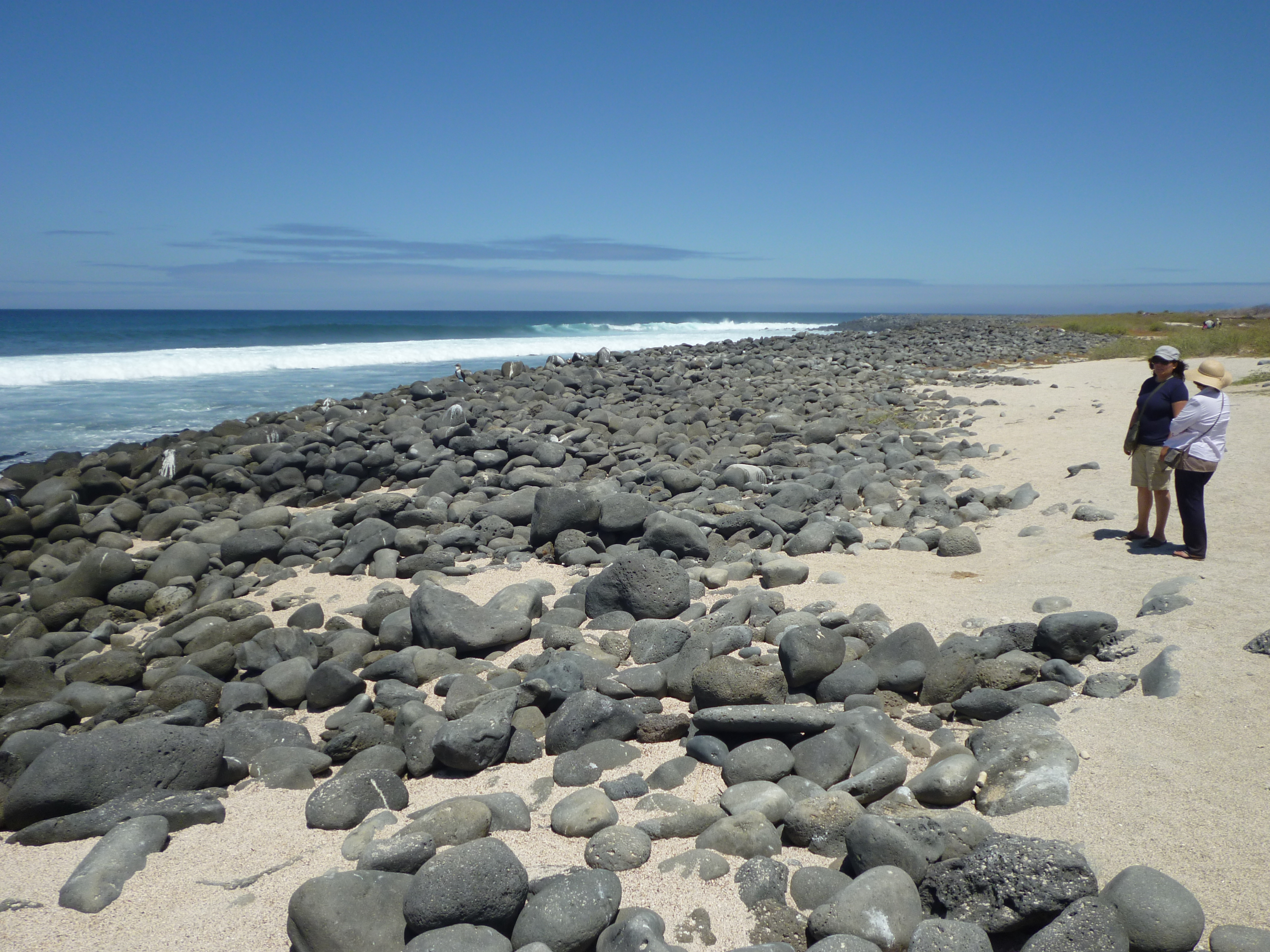
Long view of the beach on North Seymour Island, Galápagos

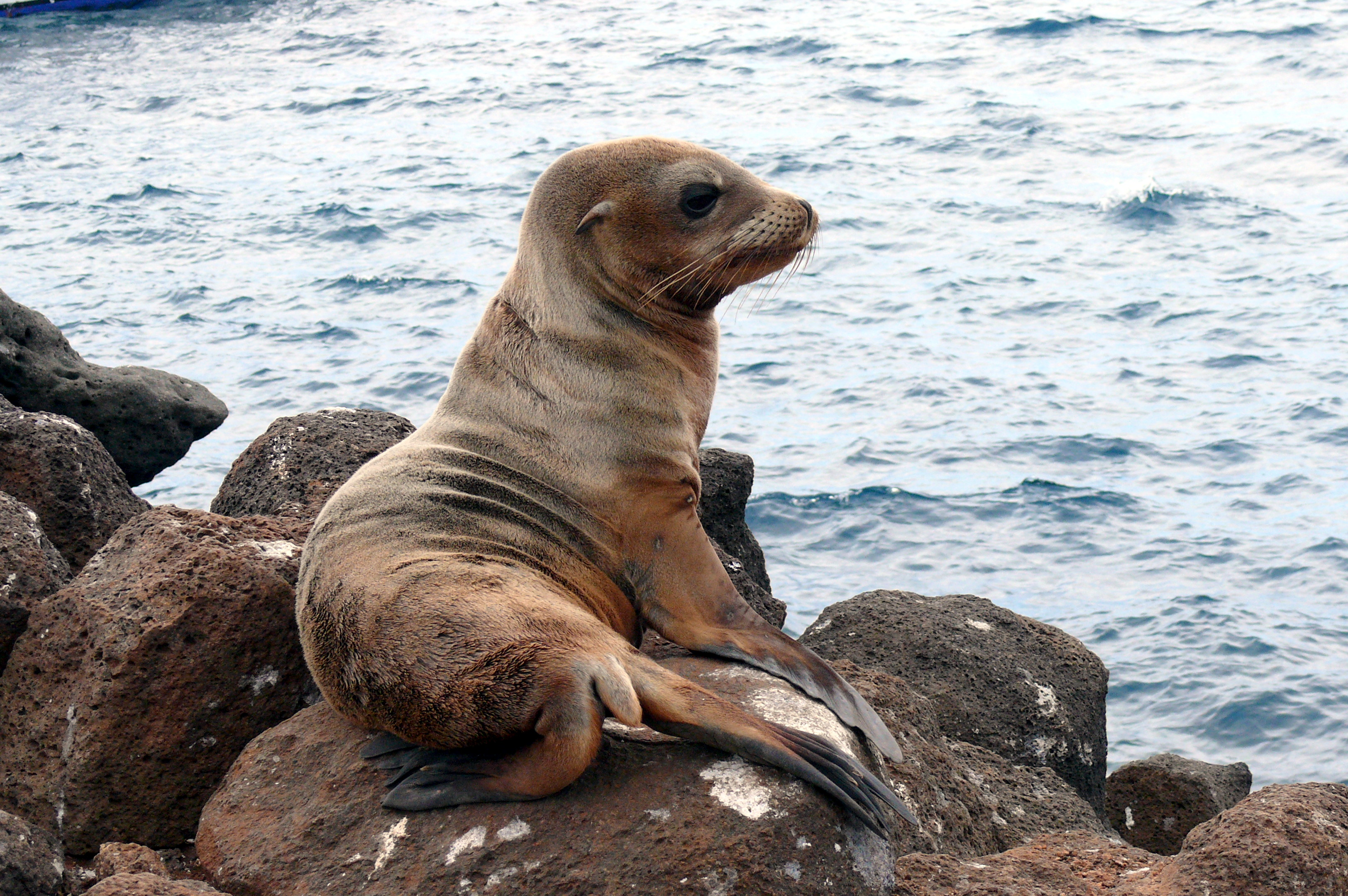
Galápagos sea lion (Zalophus wollebaeki)

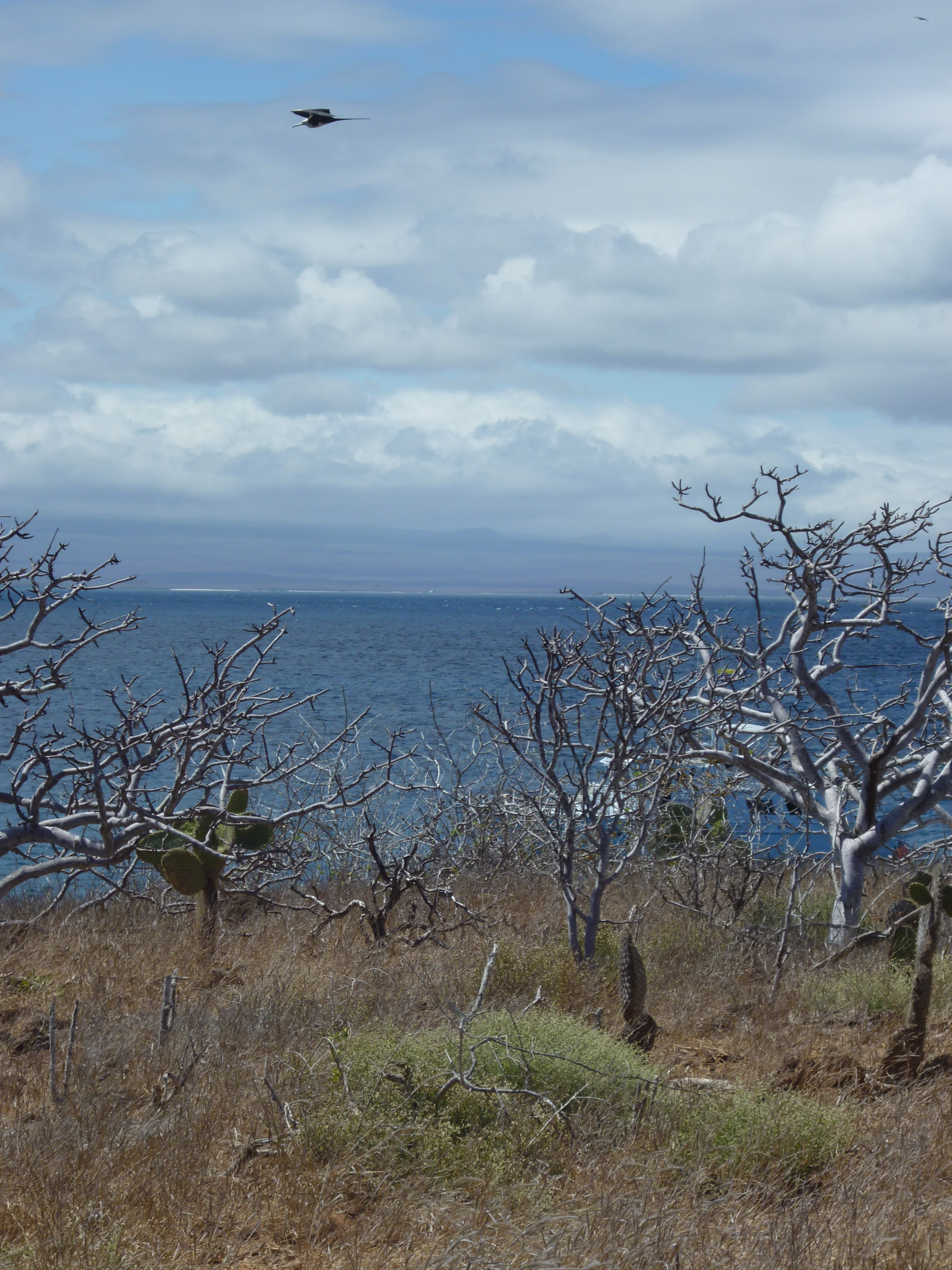
North Seymour Island in the Galápagos

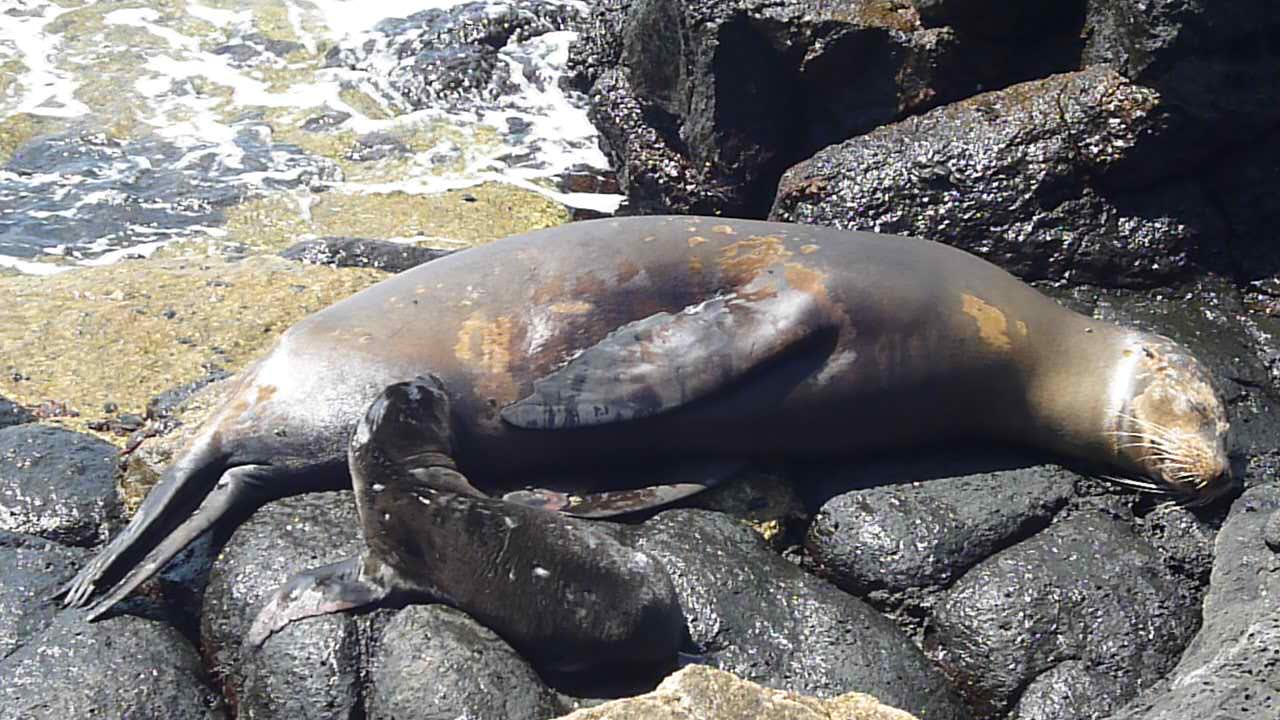
North Seymour Island Galápagos seal with baby

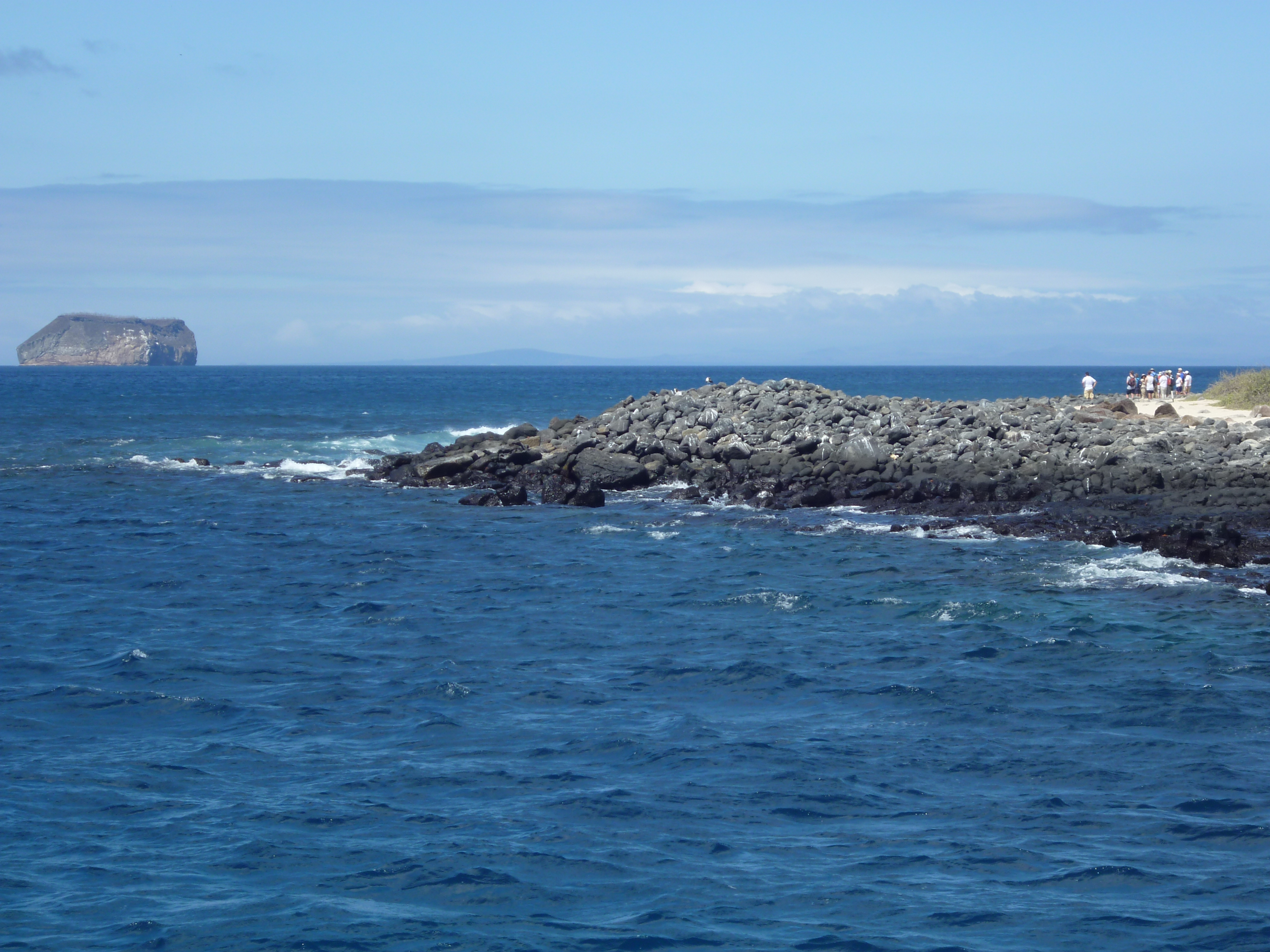
North Seymour Island in the Galápagos about to land on shore. Daphne Island is in the distance.

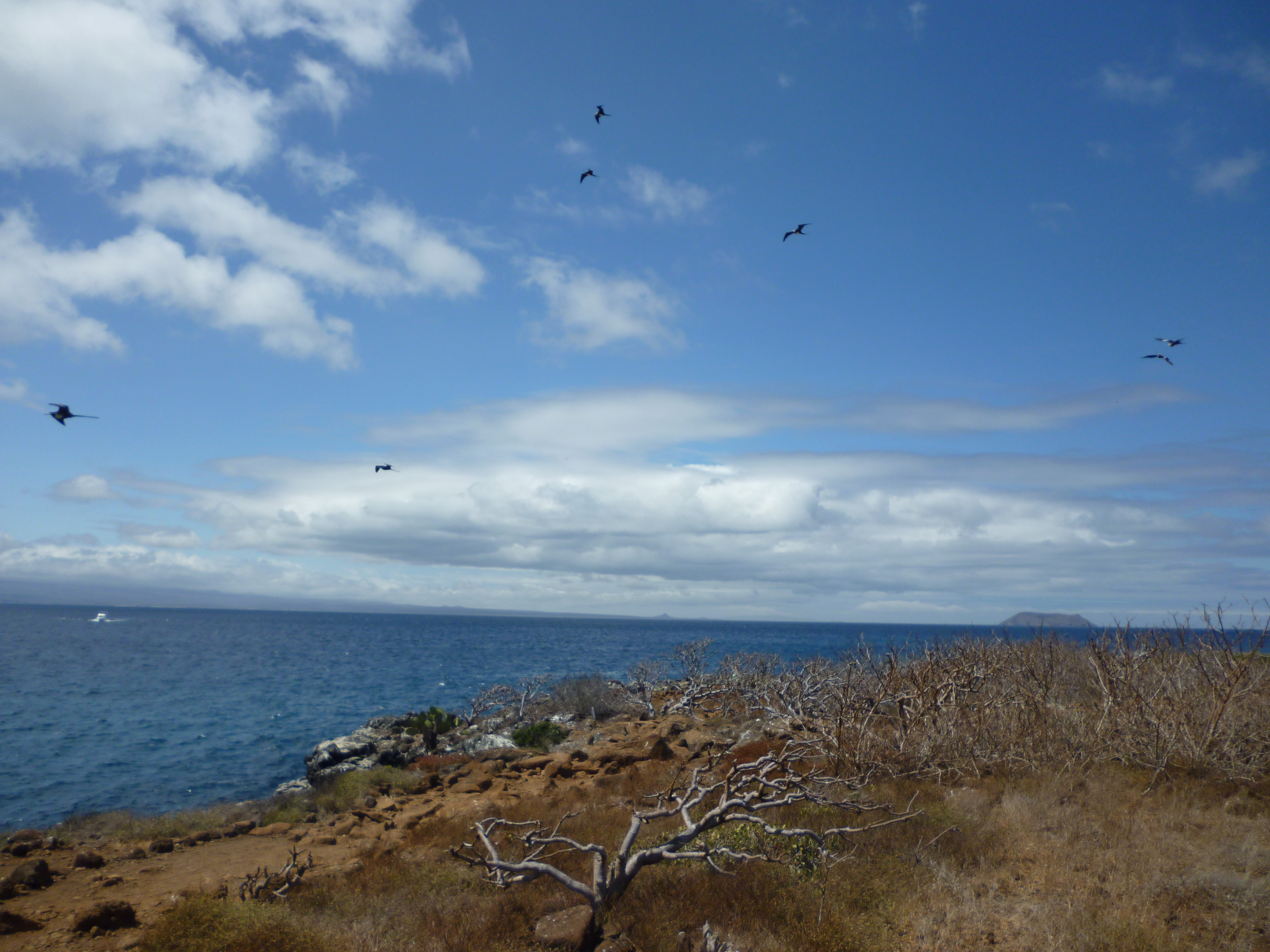
North Seymour Island in the Galápagos, Daphne Island is in the distance.

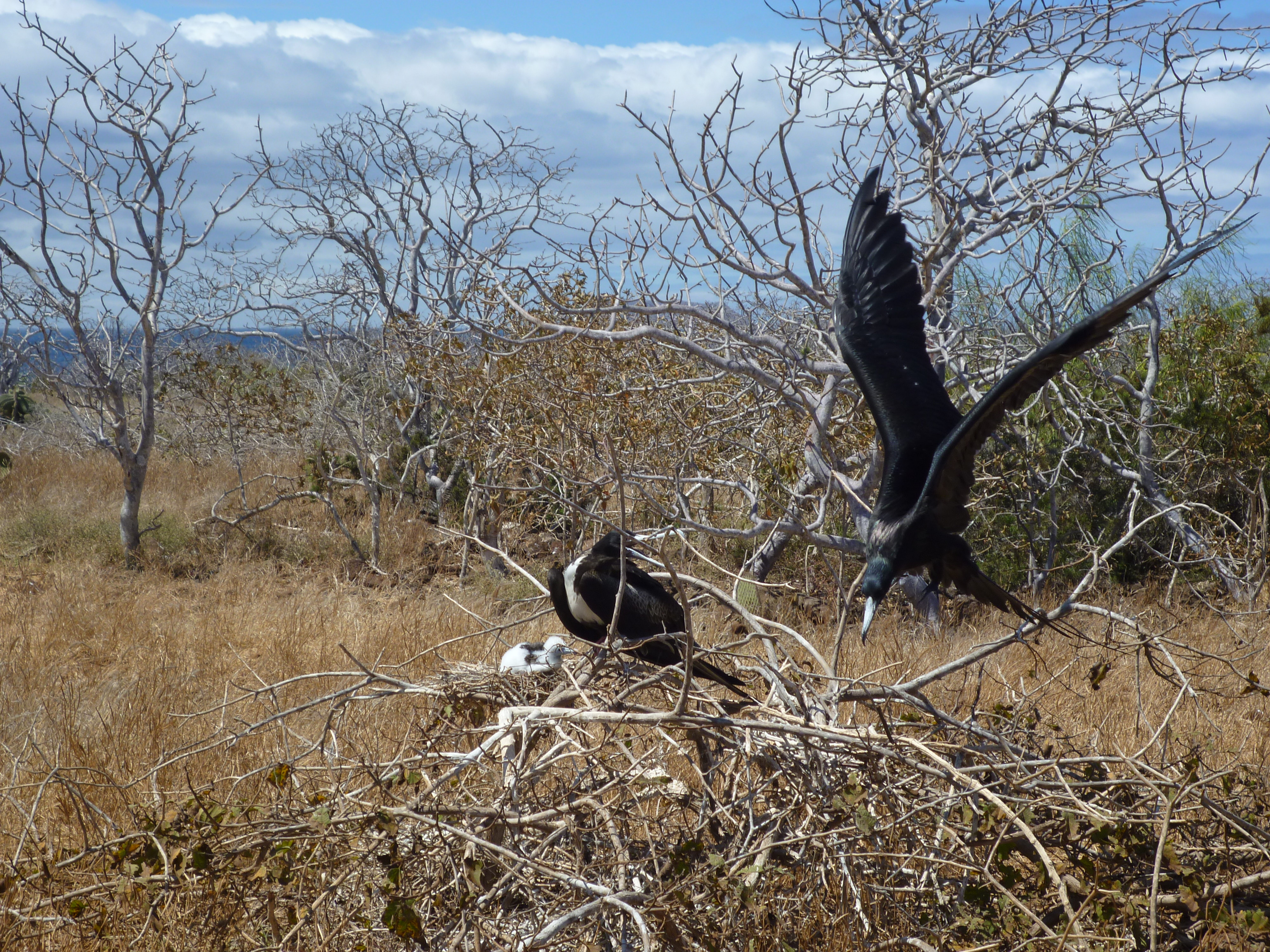
North Seymour Island in the Galápagos, a bird in flight

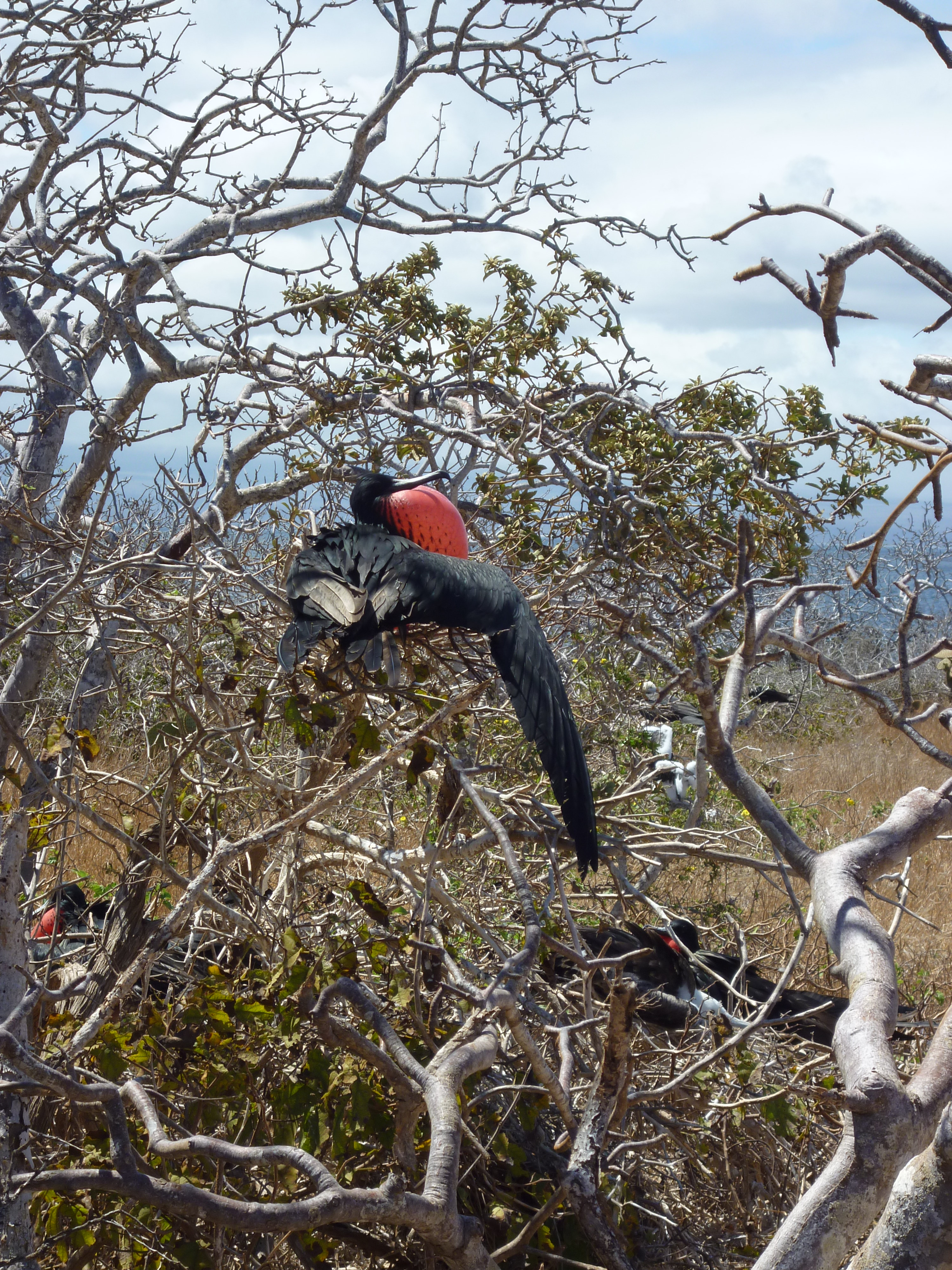
North Seymour Island in the Galápagos

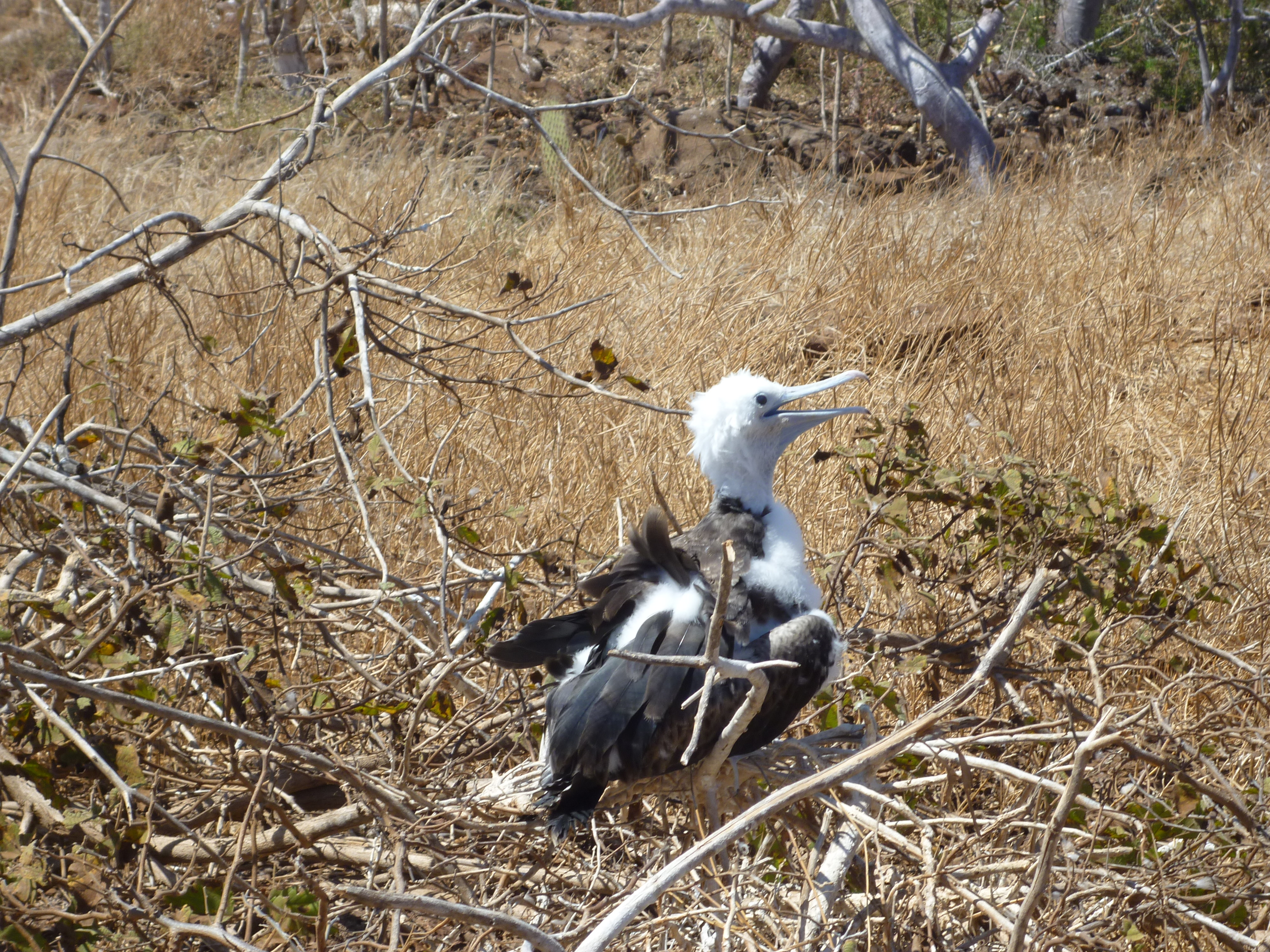
A baby bird at North Seymour Island in the Galápagos

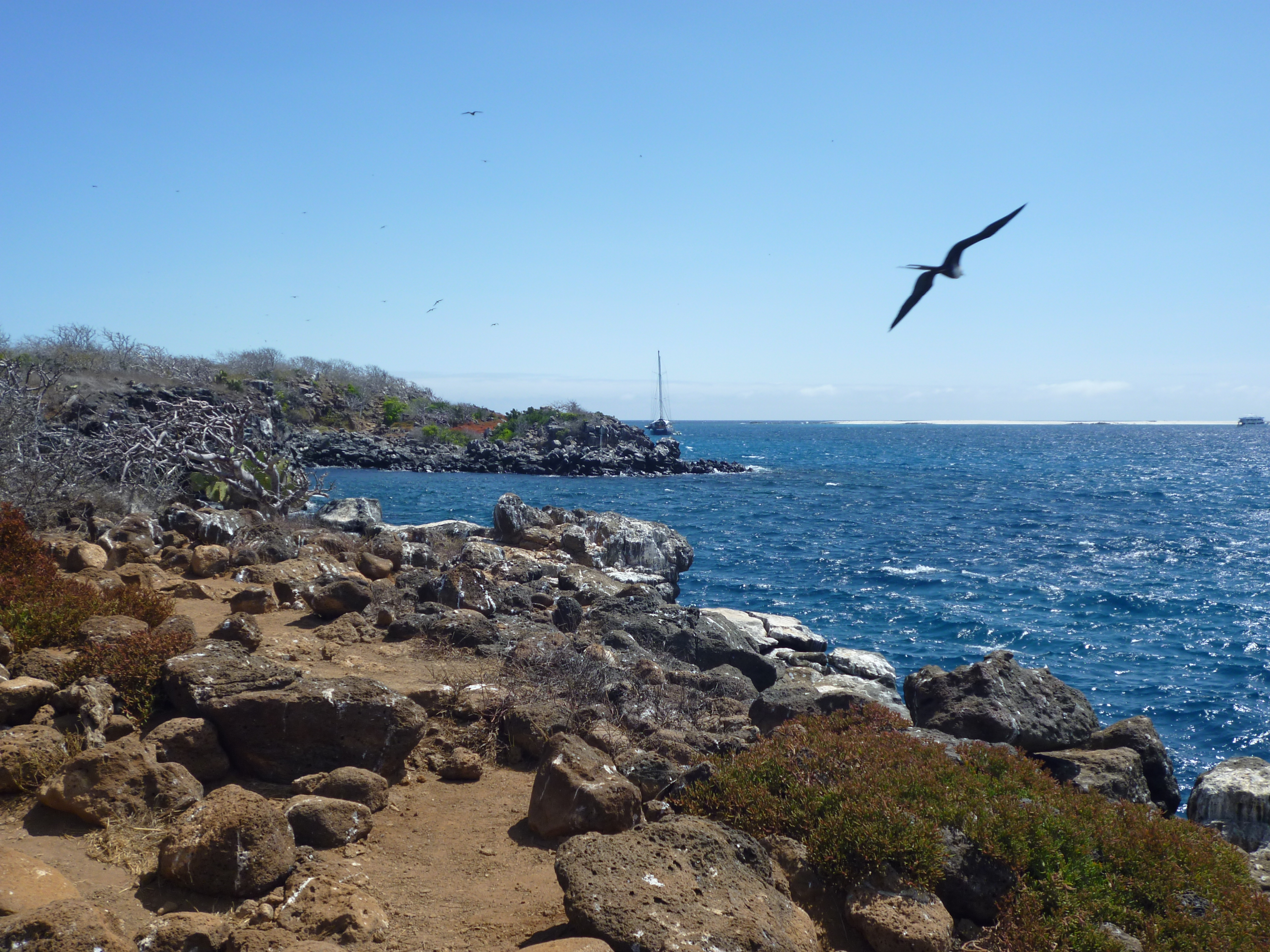
Magnificent frigatebird (Fregata magnificens) in flight on the coast of North Seymour Island in the Galápagos

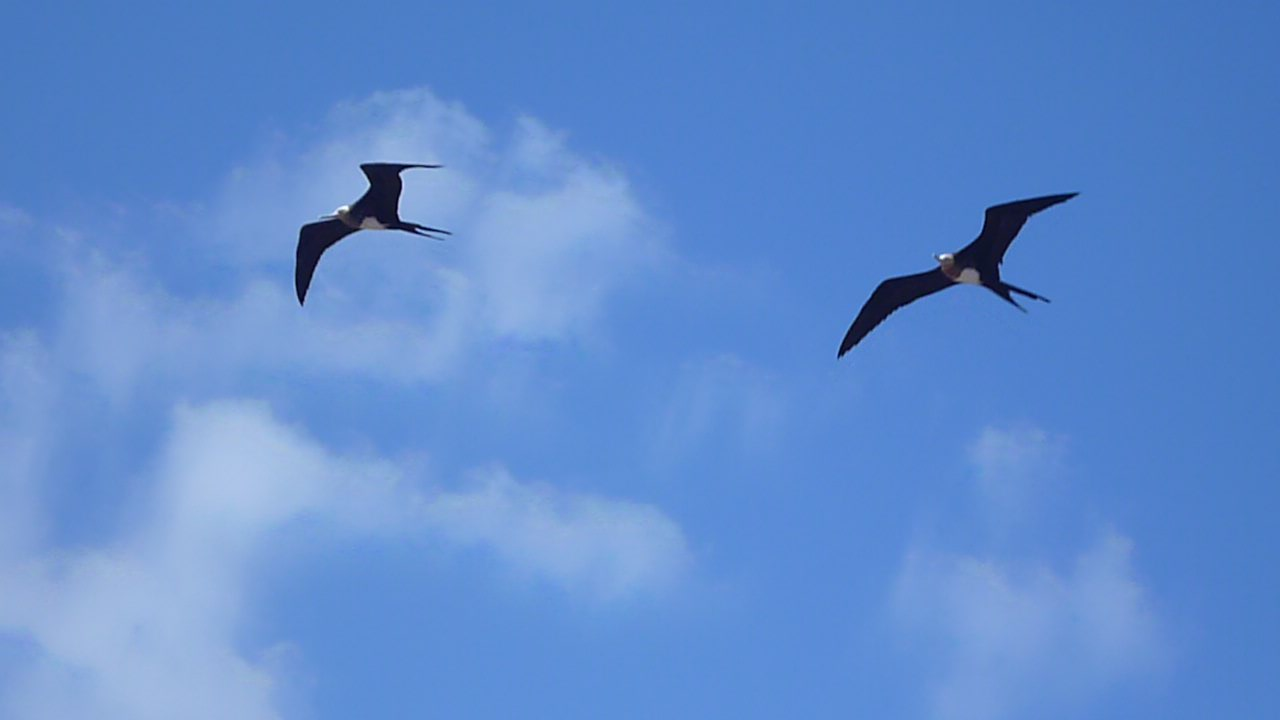
Magnificent frigatebird, North Seymour Island

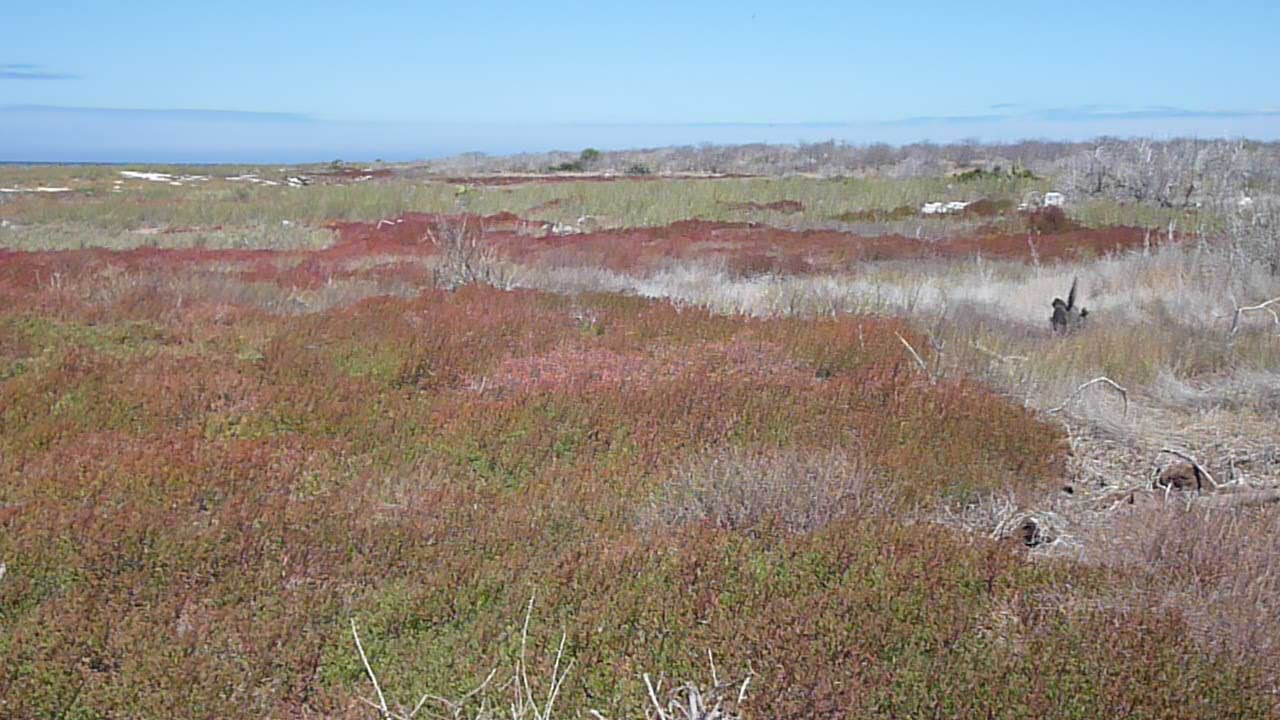
North Seymour Island

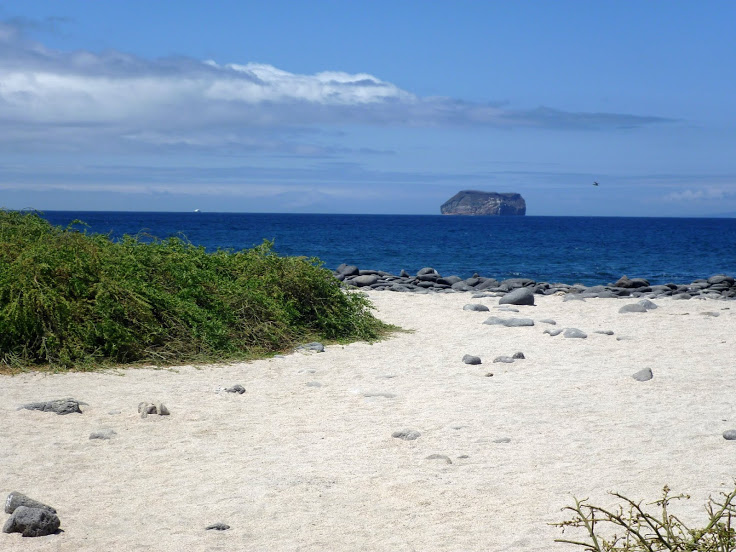
The beach at North Seymour Island in the Galápagos North. Daphne Island is in the distance.

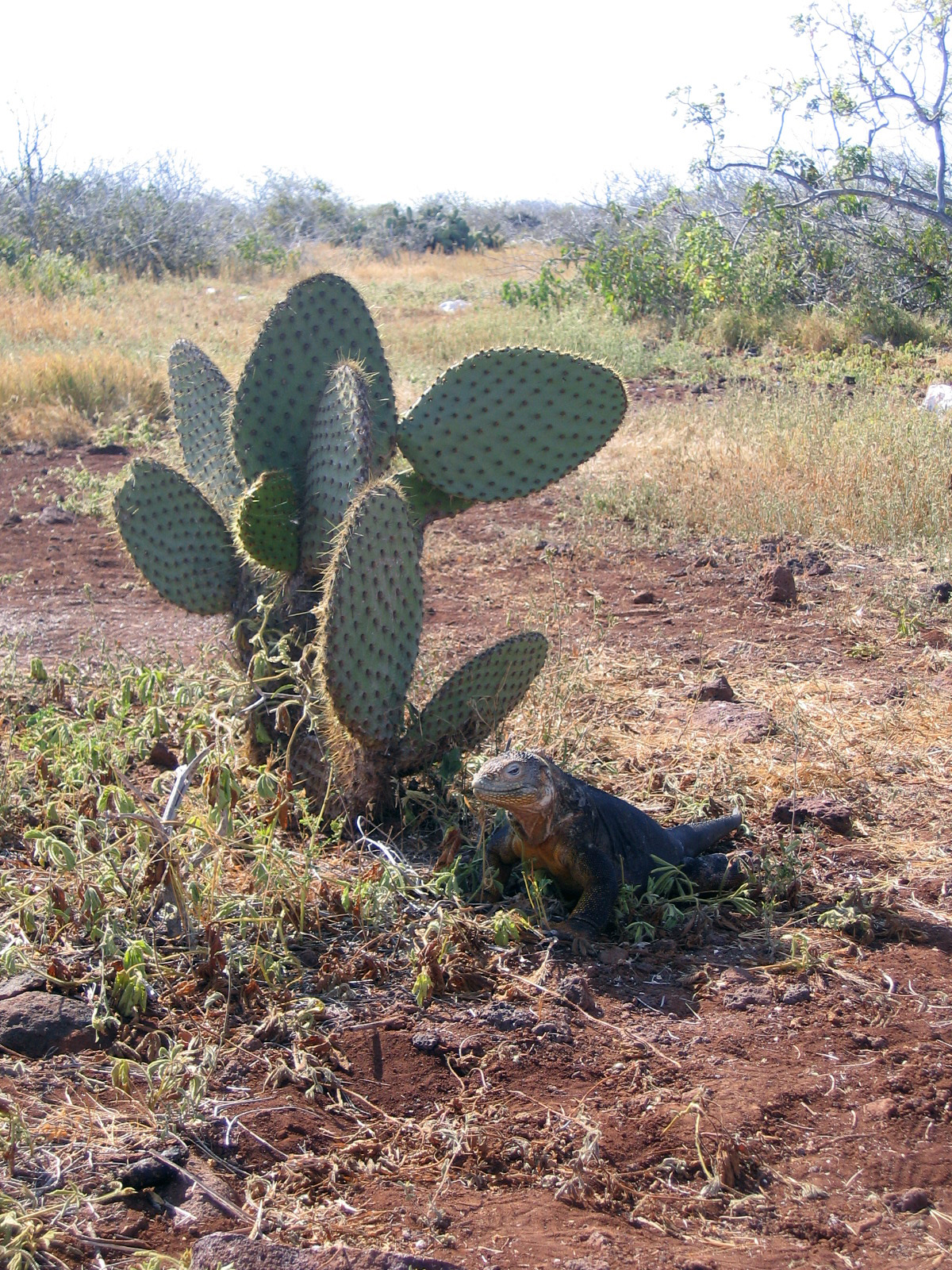
North Seymour, Galapagos, land iguana
