= Centroceras =

Centroceras may refer to:

- Centroceras (alga), a genus of red algae in the family Ceramiaceae
- Centroceras (cephalopod) Hyatt, 1884, a fossil genus of cephalopods in the family Centroceratidae
- Centroceras Wedekind, 1908, a fossil genus of cephalopods in the family Cheiloceratidae, synonym of Torleyoceras
