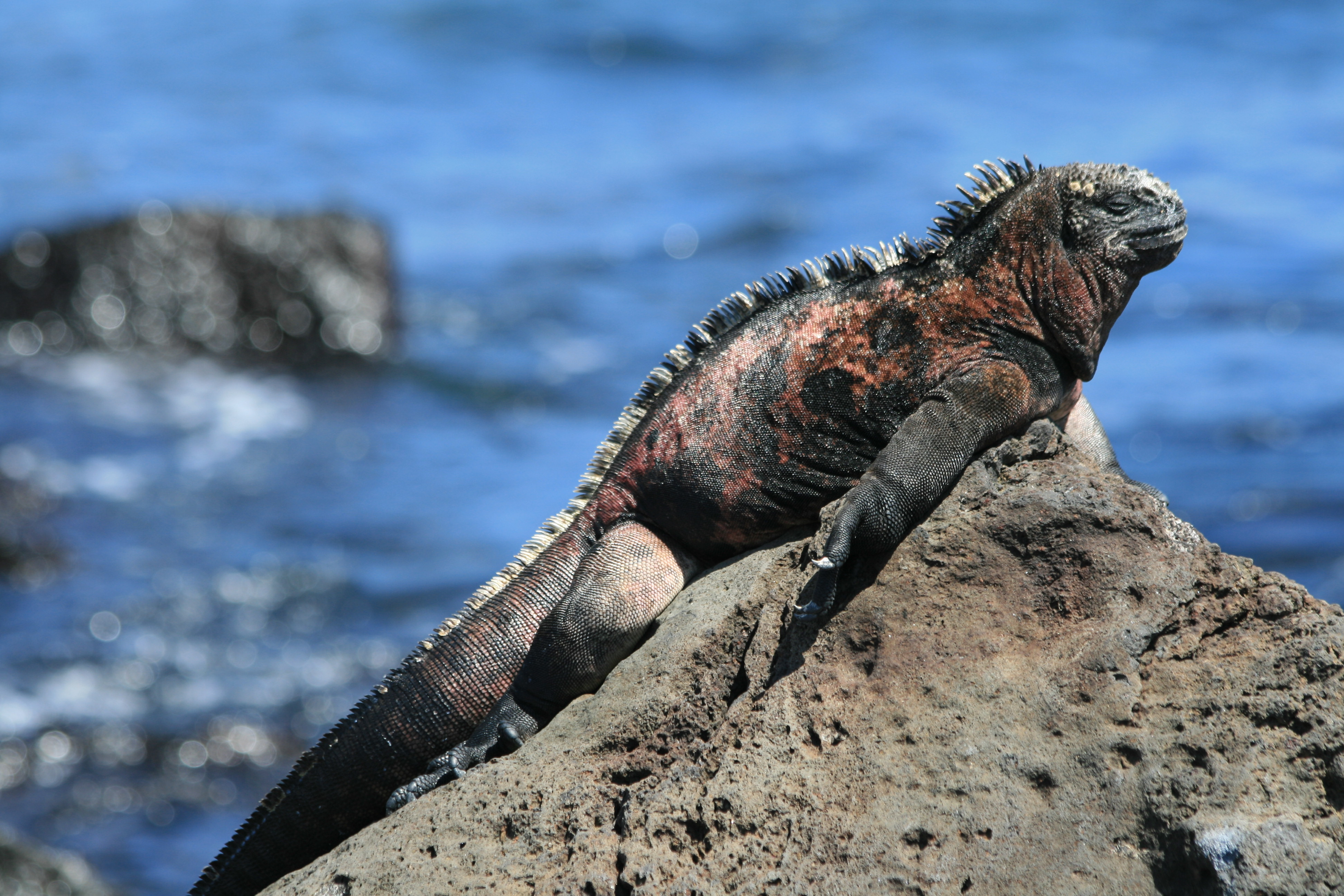

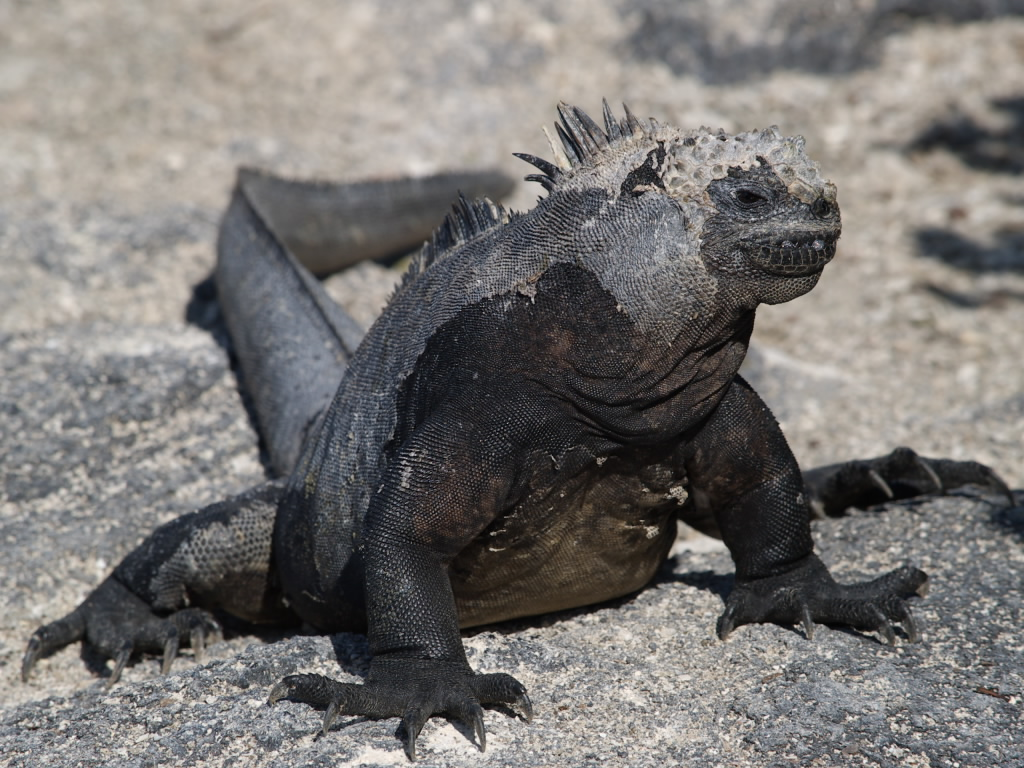

Conservation status
- Vulnerable (IUCN 3.1)
- CITES Appendix II

Scientific classification
- Kingdom: Animalia
- Phylum: Chordata
- Class: Reptilia
- Order: Squamata
- Suborder: Iguania
- Family: Iguanidae
- Genus: Amblyrhynchus; Bell, 1825
- Species: A. cristatus

Binomial name
- Amblyrhynchus cristatus Bell, 1825

Subspecies
- 7–11 subspecies; see text

= Marine iguana =

Marine iguana Temporal range: Pliocene – Recent

Species of marine reptile endemic to Galapagos Islands

The marine iguana (Amblyrhynchus cristatus), also known as the sea iguana, saltwater iguana, or Galápagos marine iguana, is a species of iguana found only on the Galápagos Islands (Ecuador). Unique among modern lizards, it is a marine reptile that has the ability to forage in the sea for algae, which make up almost all of its diet. Marine iguanas are the only extant lizard that spends time in a marine environment. Large males are able to dive to find this food source, while females and smaller males feed during low tide in the intertidal zone. They mainly live in colonies on rocky shores where they bask after visiting the relatively cold water or intertidal zone, but can also be seen in marshes, mangrove swamps and beaches. Large males defend territories for a short period, but smaller males have other breeding strategies. After mating, the female digs a nest hole in the soil where she lays her eggs, leaving them to hatch on their own a few months later.

Marine iguanas vary in appearance between the different islands and several subspecies are recognized. Although relatively large numbers remain and it is locally abundant, this protected species is considered threatened, primarily from El Niño cycles, introduced predators and chance events like oil spills.

== Taxonomy and evolution ==
=== Species description and etymology ===
The marine iguana was first described in 1825 as Amblyrhynchus cristatus by Thomas Bell. He recognized several of its distinctive features, but believed that the specimen he had received was from Mexico, a locality now known to be erroneous.

Its generic name, Amblyrhynchus, is a combination of two Greek words, Ambly- from Amblus (ἀμβλυ) meaning "blunt" and rhynchus (ρυγχος) meaning "snout". Its specific name is the Latin word cristatus meaning "crested," and refers to the low crest of spines along the animal's back.

Amblyrhynchus is a monotypic genus, having only one species, Amblyrhynchus cristatus.

=== Evolution ===
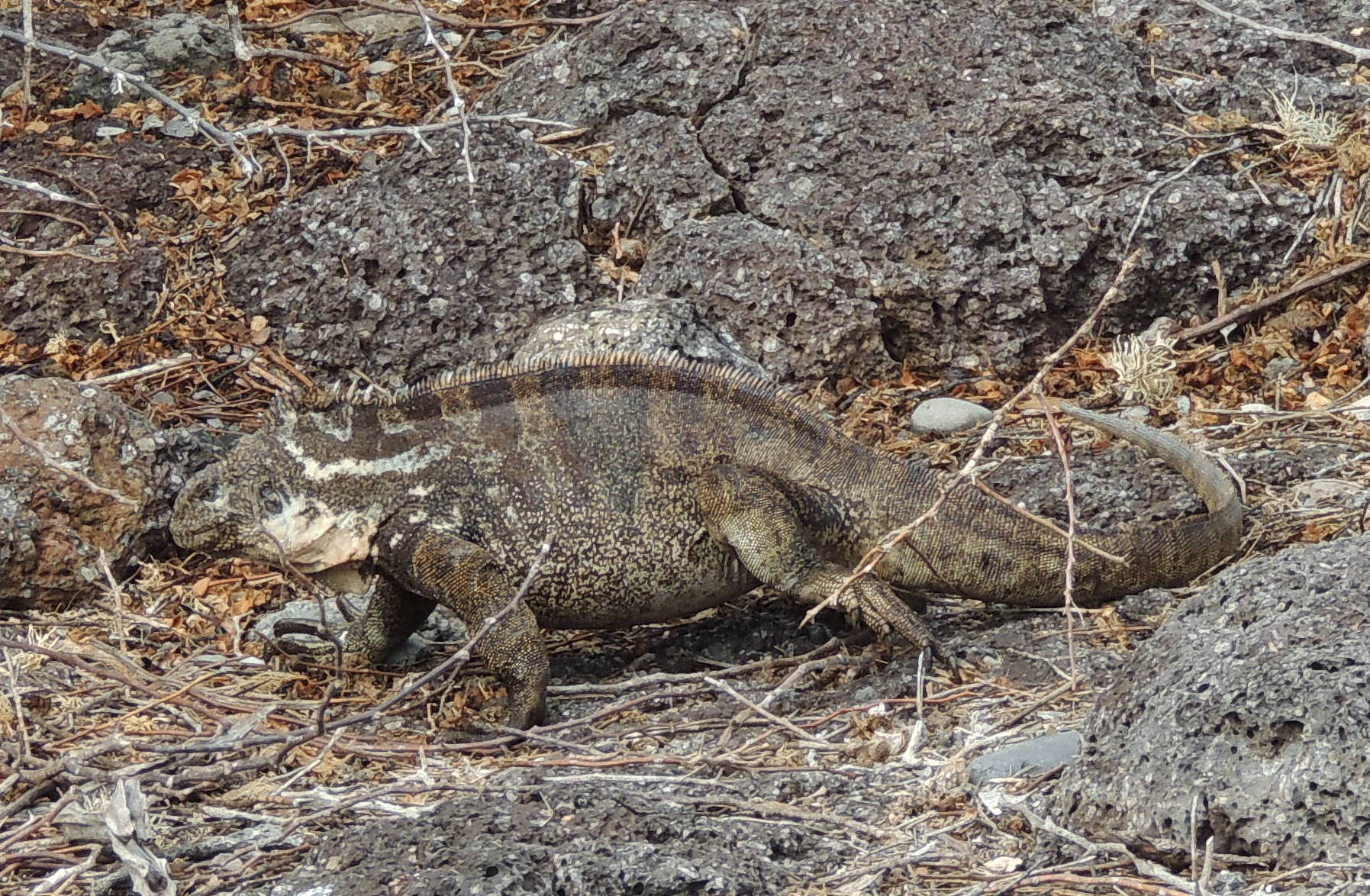
A hybrid iguana, the result of interbreeding between a marine iguana and a Galápagos land iguana

Researchers theorize that Galapagos land iguanas (genus Conolophus) and marine iguanas evolved from a common ancestor since arriving on the islands from Central or South America, presumably by rafting. The land and marine iguanas of the Galápagos form a clade, the nearest relatives of which are the Ctenosaura iguanas of Mexico and Central America. Based on a study that relied on mtDNA, the marine iguana was estimated to have diverged from land iguanas some 5-15 million years ago, which is older than any of the extant Galápagos islands. It has therefore traditionally been thought that the ancestral species inhabited parts of the volcanic archipelago that are now submerged. However, a more recent study that included both mtDNA and nDNA indicates that the two split about 4.5 million years ago, which is near the age of the oldest extant Galápagos islands (Española and San Cristóbal).

The marine iguana and Galápagos land iguana remain mutually fertile in spite of being separated by millions of years and assigned to distinct genera. They have been known to hybridize where their ranges overlap, resulting in the so-called hybrid iguana. This is very rare and has only been documented a few times on South Plaza, a tiny island where the usually separated breeding territories and seasons of the two species overlap. The hybrids have intermediate features, stay on land and are infertile.

The different marine iguana populations fall into three main clades: western islands, northeastern islands and southeastern islands. These can be further divided, each subclade generally matching marine iguanas from one or two primary island, except on San Cristóbal where there are two subclades (a northeastern and a southwestern). However, even the oldest divergence between marine iguana populations is quite recent; no more than 230,000 years and likely less than 50,000 years. On occasion one makes it to another island than its home island, resulting in hybridization between different marine iguana populations. There is one confirmed record of a marine iguana outside the Galápagos Islands; in 2014 an individual appeared on Isla de la Plata near the Ecuadorian mainland.

=== Subspecies ===
Seven or eight subspecies of the marine iguana, listed alphabetically, have traditionally been recognized:

- A. c. albemarlensis Eibl-Eibesfeldt, 1962 – Isabela Island
- A. c. ater Gray, 1831 (not always recognized) – Pinzón Island
- A. c. cristatus Bell, 1825 – Fernandina Island
- A. c. hassi Eibl-Eibesfeldt, 1962 – Santa Cruz Island
- A. c. mertensi Eibl-Eibesfeldt, 1962 – San Cristóbal and Santiago Islands
- A. c. nanus Garman, 1892 – Genovesa Island
- A. c. sielmanni Eibl-Eibesfeldt, 1962 – Pinta Island
- A. c. venustissimus Eibl-Eibesfeldt, 1956 – Española Island and adjacent tiny Gardner Island

In 2017, the first comprehensive taxonomic review of the species in more than 50 years came to another result based on morphological and genetic evidence, including recognizing five new subspecies (three of these are small-island populations that were not previously assigned to any subspecies):

- A. c. cristatus Bell, 1825 (albermarlensis and ater are junior synonyms) – Isabela Island and Fernandina Island
- A. c. godzilla Miralles et al., 2017 – northeastern part of San Cristóbal Island, named after the character of Godzilla
- A. c. hassi Eibl-Eibesfeldt, 1962 – Santa Cruz Island and smaller adjacent islands, such as Baltra Island
- A. c. hayampi Miralles et al., 2017 – Marchena Island
- A. c. jeffreysi Miralles et al., 2017 – Wolf Island, Darwin Island and Roca Redonda
- A. c. mertensi Eibl-Eibesfeldt, 1962 – southwestern part of San Cristóbal Island
- A. c. nanus Garman, 1892 – Genovesa Island
- A. c. sielmanni Eibl-Eibesfeldt, 1962 – Pinta Island
- A. c. trillmichi Miralles et al., 2017 – Santa Fé Island
- A. c. venustissimus Eibl-Eibesfeldt, 1956 – Española Island (including adjacent tiny Gardener Island) and Floreana Island
- A. c. wikelskii Miralles et al., 2017 – Santiago Island and smaller adjacent islands, such as Rábida Island
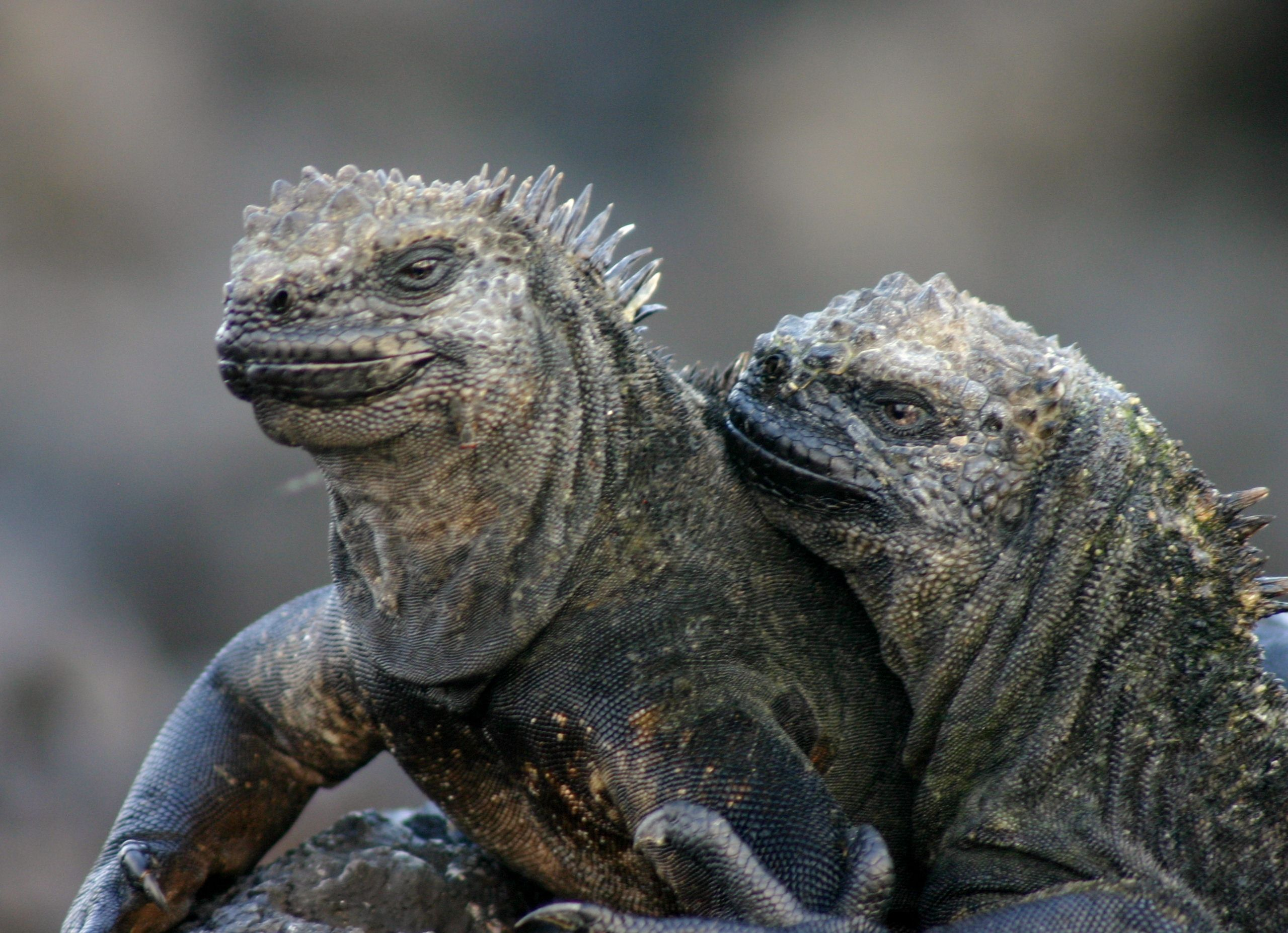
A. c. albemarlensis on Isabela Island (a synonym of A. c. cristatus based on the 2017 review)

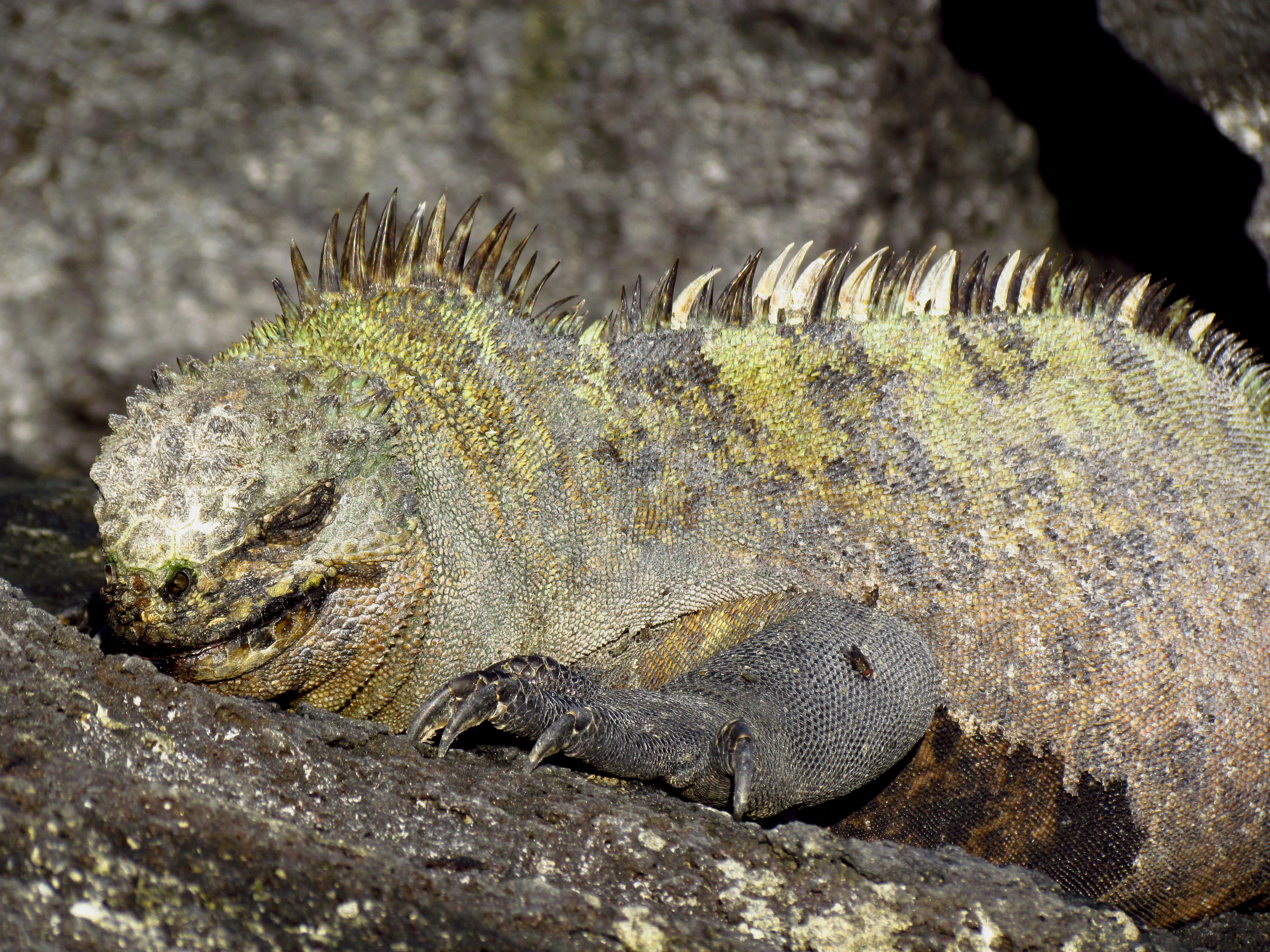
A. c. cristatus on Fernandina Island

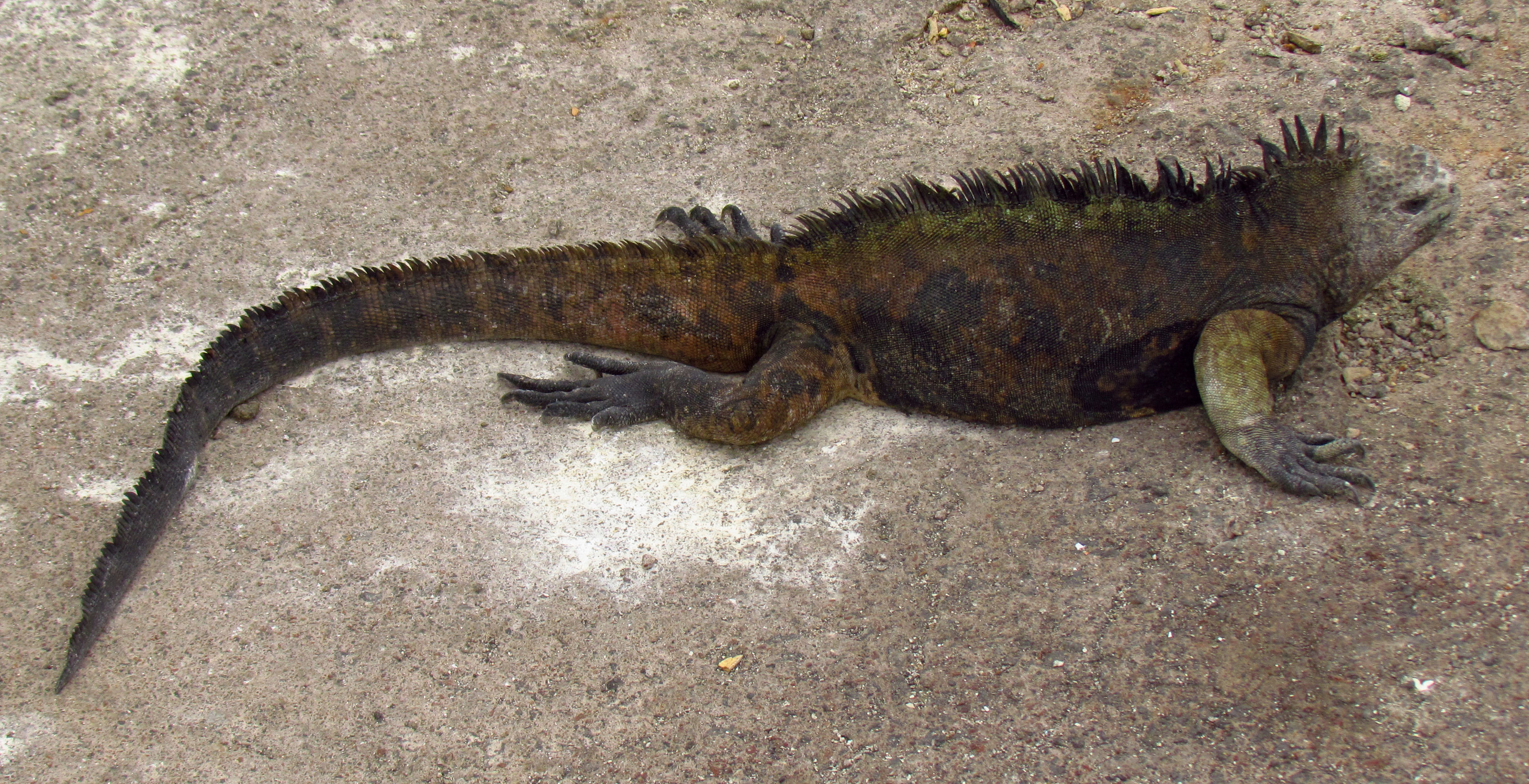
A. c. hassi on Santa Cruz Island

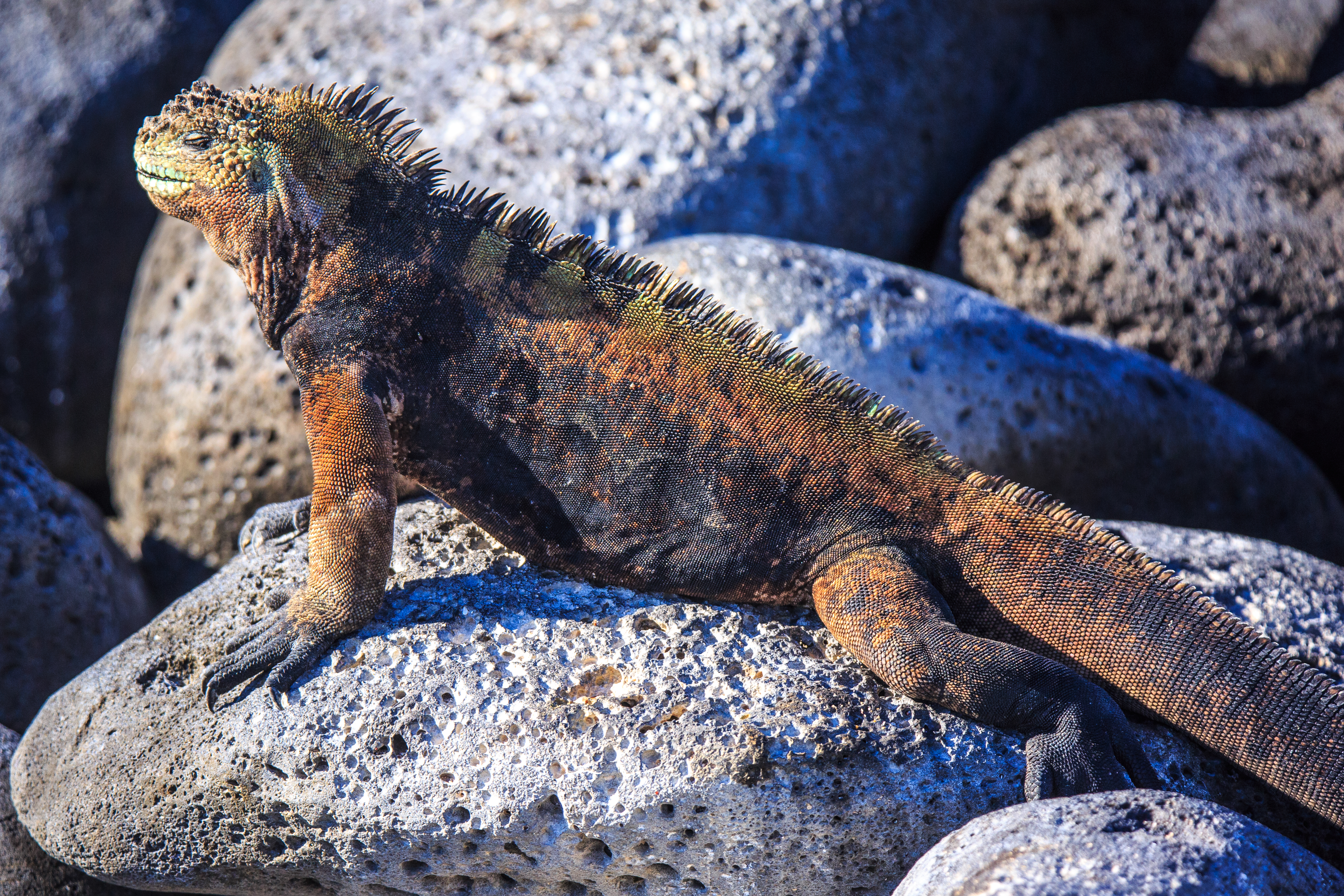
A. c. mertensi on Isla Lobos, off San Cristóbal Island

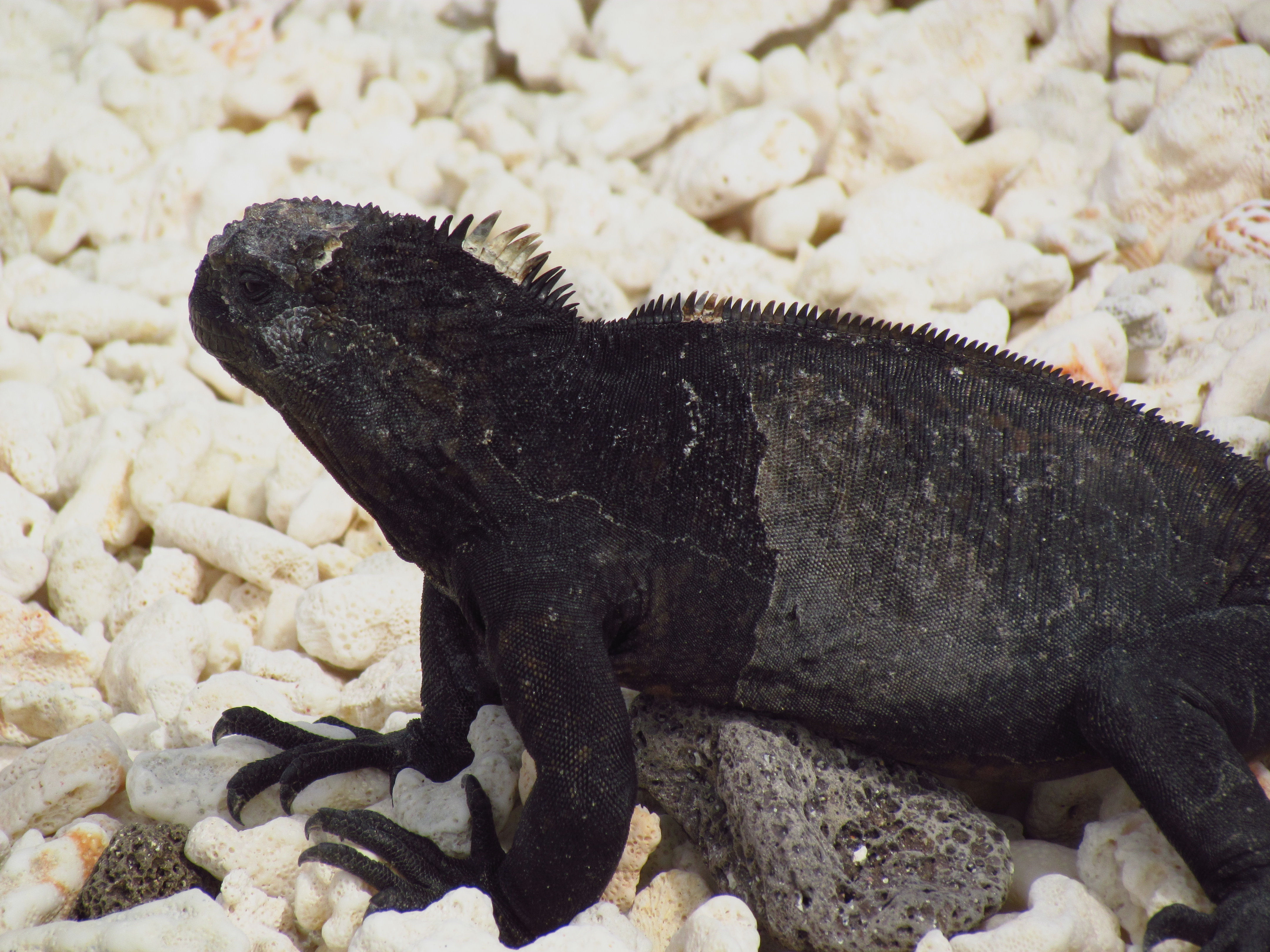
A. c. nanus on Genovesa Island

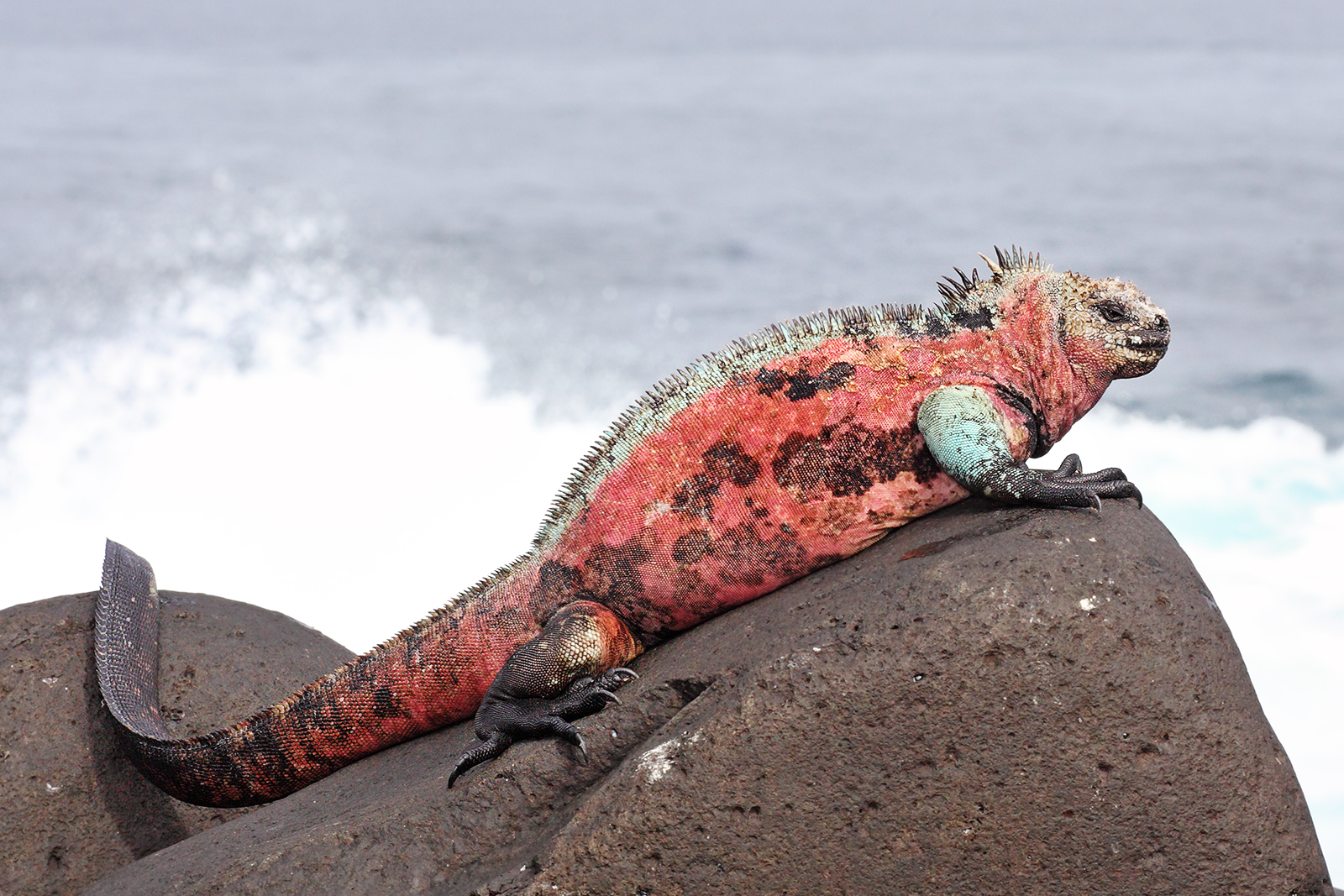
A. c. venustissimus on Española Island

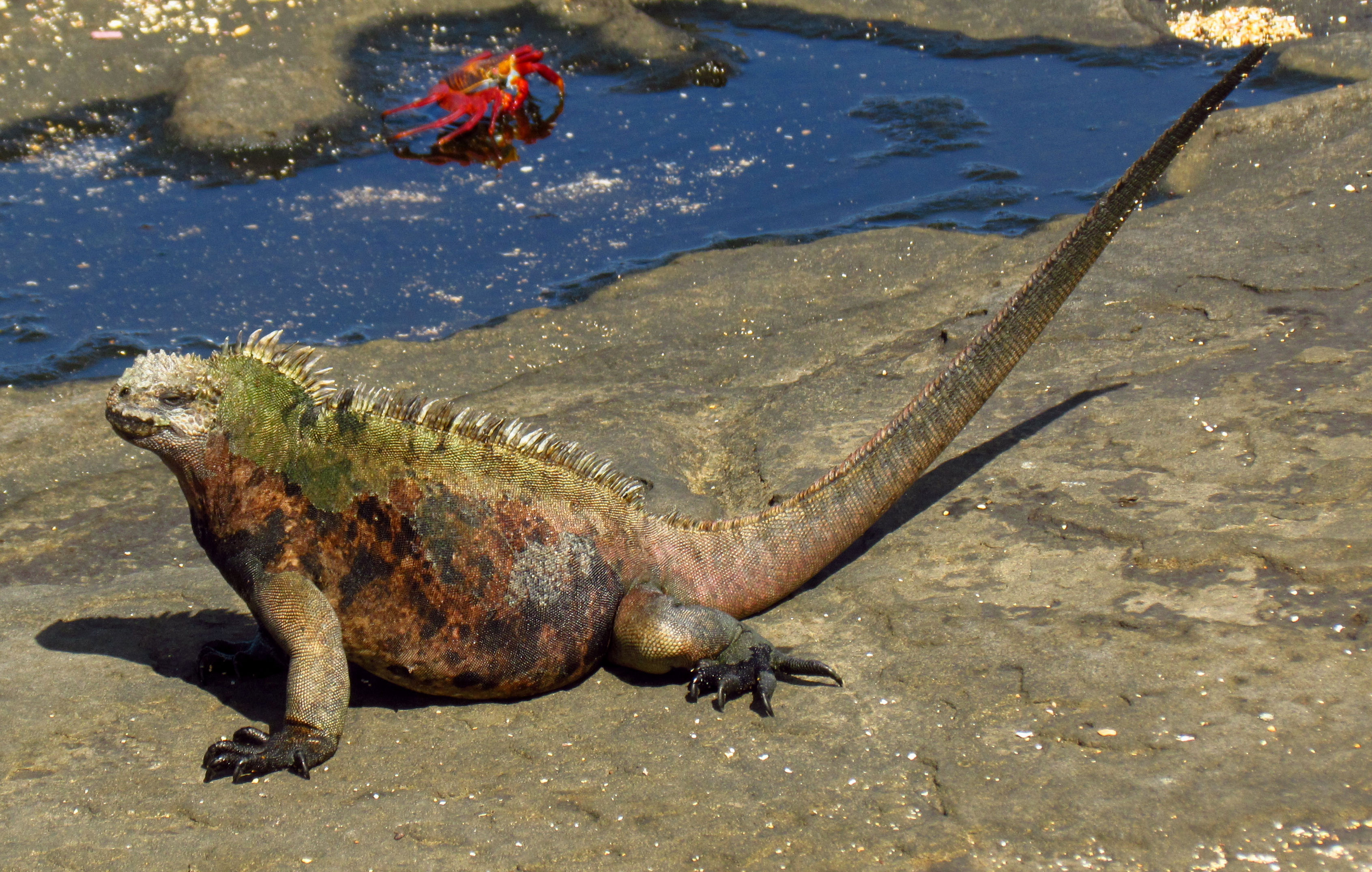
A. c. wikelskii on Santiago Island (formerly included in A. c. mertensi)

== Appearance ==
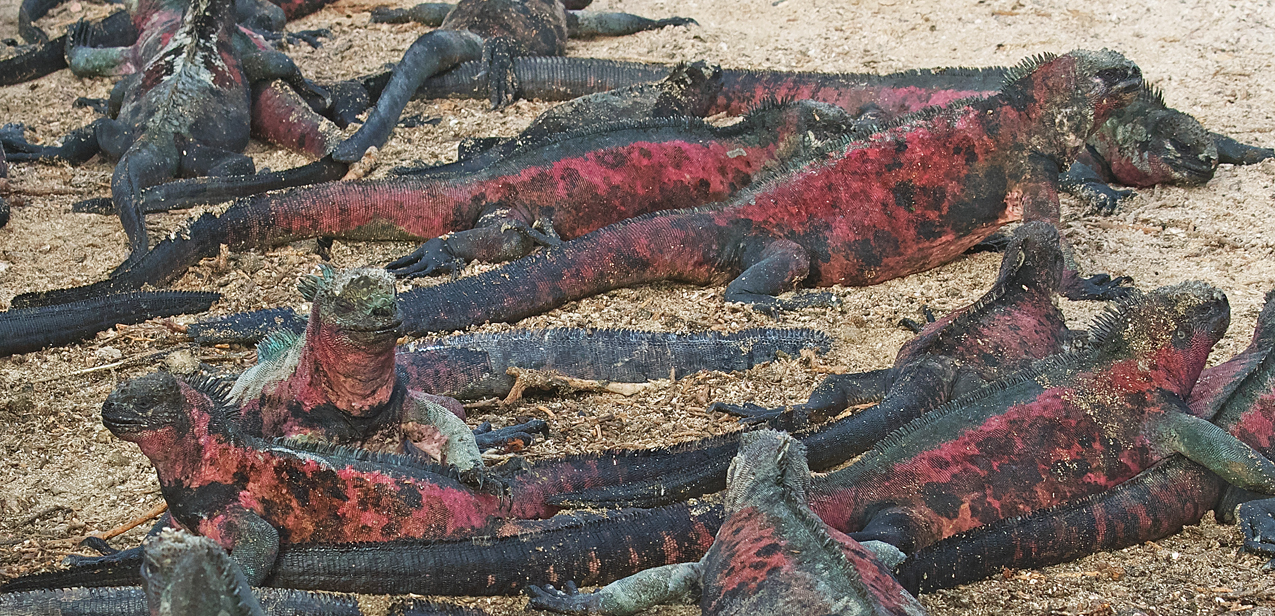
Marine iguanas from Española Island are the most colourful and have sometimes been called "Christmas iguanas"

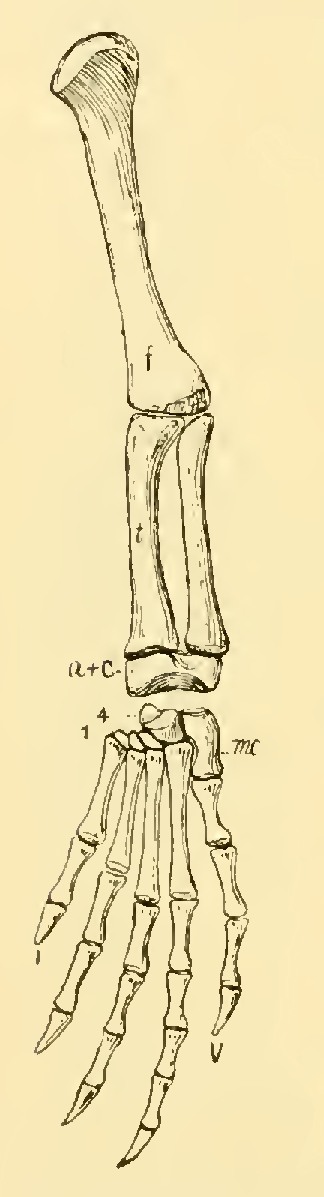
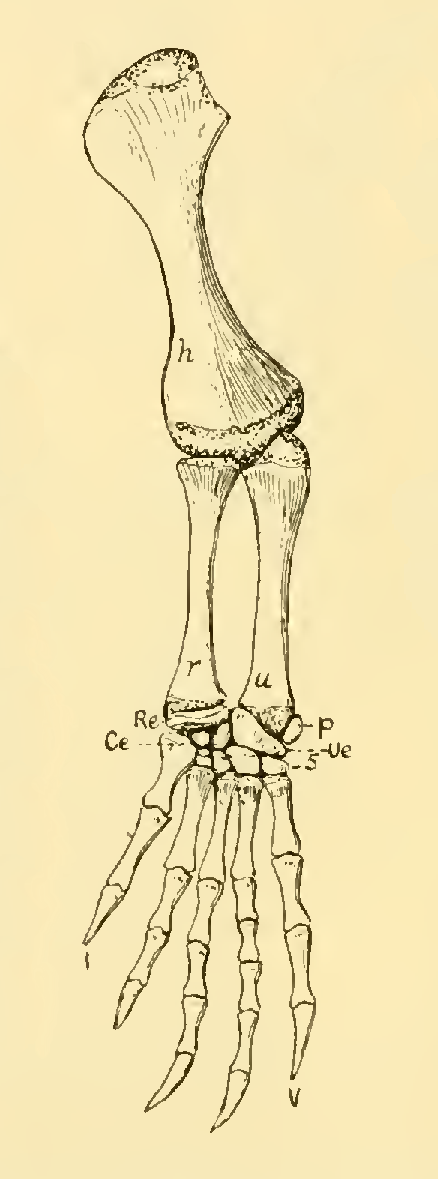
Hind and front limbs. The robust front limb bones (right) provide ballast when diving

Early visitors to the Galápagos Islands considered the marine iguanas ugly and disgusting. In 1798, captain James Colnett of the British Royal Navy wrote:

The [i]guanas are small, and of a sooty black, which, if possible, heightens their native ugliness. Indeed, so disgusting is their appearance, that no one on board could be prevailed on, to take them as food.

On his visit to the islands in 1835, despite making extensive observations on the creatures, Charles Darwin was revolted by the animals' appearance, writing:

The black Lava rocks on the beach are frequented by large (2–3 ft [0.6–0.9 m]), most disgusting, clumsy Lizards. They are as black as the porous rocks over which they crawl & seek their prey from the Sea. Somebody calls them 'imps of darkness'. They assuredly well-become the land they inhabit. (Note: The phrase 'imps of darkness' for the marine iguana typically has been attributed to Charles Darwin, but it was first used a decade earlier by Maria Graham when editing Robert Dampier's journal for the book Voyage of H. M. S. Blonde to the Sandwich islands, in the years 1824-1825.)

Marine iguanas have a thickset body and relatively short, robust limbs. Adults have a row of spines extending from the nape, along the back to the tail. Males have longer spines, and larger bony plates on the top of their head than females. There are some differences in the spines depending on the island and they are most elaborate on Fernandina (subspecies cristatus). The scales on the top of the head of the marine iguana are quite conical and pointed. Although less extreme, the same can be seen in the Galápagos land iguanas (genus Conolophus), while these scales at most are slightly domed in other iguanas. Overall the skeleton of the marine iguana shows many similarities with the chuckwallas (genus Sauromalus), but this is an example of homoplasy, as the two are not closely related.

Marine iguanas are not always black; the young have a lighter coloured dorsal stripe, and some adult specimens are grey. Dark tones allow the lizards to rapidly absorb heat to minimize the period of lethargy after emerging from the water. The marine iguana lacks agility on land but is a graceful swimmer. Its laterally flattened tail provides propulsion and the row of spines along the back provide stability, while its long, sharp claws allow it to hold onto rocks in strong currents. Adult males vary in colour with the season, becoming brighter when breeding. There are also major differences in the colour of the adult males depending on the subspecies. Males of the relatively small southern islands of Española, Floreana and Santa Fé (subspecies venustissimus and trillmichi) are the most colourful, with bright pinkish-red and turquoise markings. In comparison, those of the relatively small northern islands of Genovesa, Marchena, Pinta, Wolf and Darwin (jeffreysi, hayampi, sielmanni and nanus) are almost all blackish without contrasting markings. Other subspecies tend to resemble duller versions of venustissimus and trillmichi, or are blackish with markings in pale yellowish, ochre, greenish or grey (sooty to near white). It is suspected that the exact algal diet of each population plays a role in their colour. Females show much less variation between the islands and are typically dark with less contrasting colours than the males. In most places, females do not change colour conspicuously between the breeding and non-breeding season, but at least on Española (subspecies venustissimus) they do assume relatively bright male-like colours when nesting, which is possibly related to their need of defending the nest from other females on an island with few suitable sites.

=== Size ===
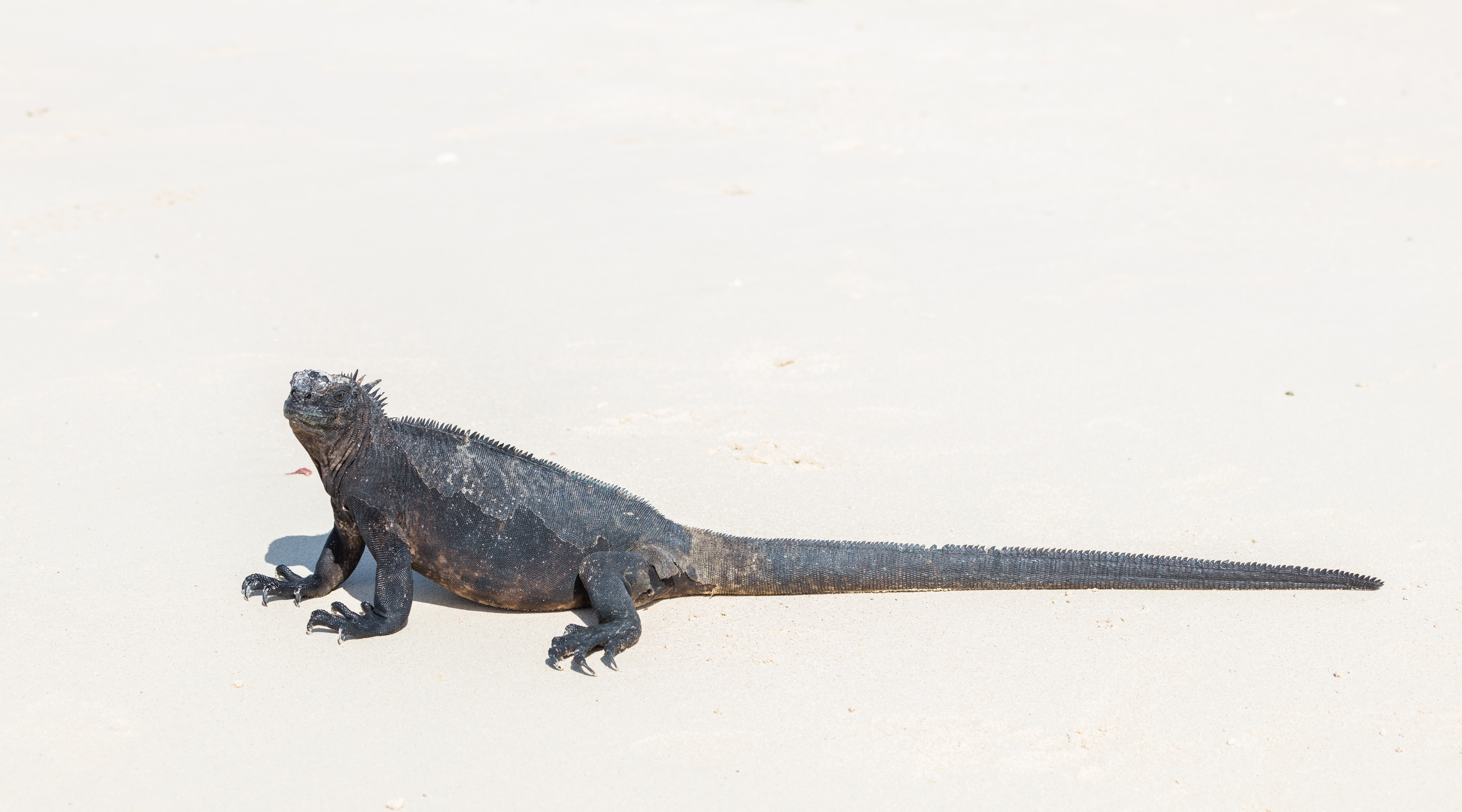
Marine iguanas from Santa Cruz Island (subspecies hassi) are among the largest

Marine iguanas typically range from 12 to 56 cm (4.7–22.0 in) in snout-to-vent length and have a tail length from 17 to 84 cm (6.7–33.1 in). There are major geographical differences, as iguanas from large islands tend to grow relatively large as adults, while those from small islands are smaller in size. In one study, the average snout-to-vent length on Wolf and Darwin Islands (subspecies jeffreysi) was about 19 cm (7.5 in), and those on Genovesa Island (subspecies nanus) were only slightly larger. In comparison, Santa Cruz marine iguanas (hassi) had an average snout-to-vent length of about 35 cm (14 in), and those of Isabela and Fernandina (cristatus) were only slightly smaller. Other subspecies were of intermediate size, in between the small Wolf, Darwin and Genovesa iguanas and the large Santa Cruz, Isabela and Fernandina iguanas. In another study, the largest were from western San Cristóbal Island (mertensi), followed by those from Isabela (cristatus, in part), Floreana (venustissimus, in part), eastern San Cristóbal (godzilla), Fernandina (cristatus, in part) and Santa Cruz (hassi). The smallest by far were from Genovesa (nanus), but this study did not include any marine iguanas from Wolf and Darwin Islands. The remaining island populations were of intermediate size.

The maximum weight of adult males ranges from 12 kg (26 lb) on southern Isabela to 1 kg (2.2 lb) on Genovesa. This difference in body size of marine iguanas between islands is due to the amount of food available, which depends on sea temperature and algae growth.

Marine iguanas are sexually dimorphic with adult males on average being significantly longer and weighing about twice as much as adult females. Additionally, males have broader heads and larger tubercles than females. However, the largest females are only about 20–40% shorter than the largest males. There is a correlation between longevity and body size, particularly for adult males. Large body size in males is selected sexually, but can be detrimental during El Niño events when resources are scarce. This results in large males suffering higher mortality than females and smaller adult males. The mortality rates of marine iguanas are explained through the size difference between the sexes. Some individuals have been shown to shrink in body size by up to 20% during El Niño events and grow back to their previous size when food became available again.

== Behavior ==
=== Reproduction and life cycle ===
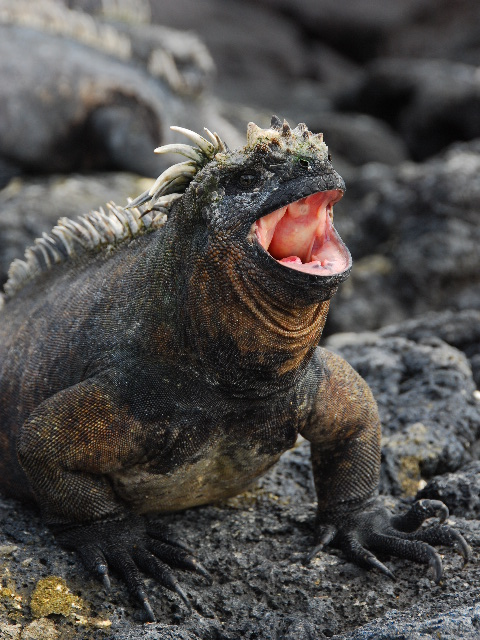
A male will threaten another male by bobbing his head and opening the mouth, displaying the reddish pink interior

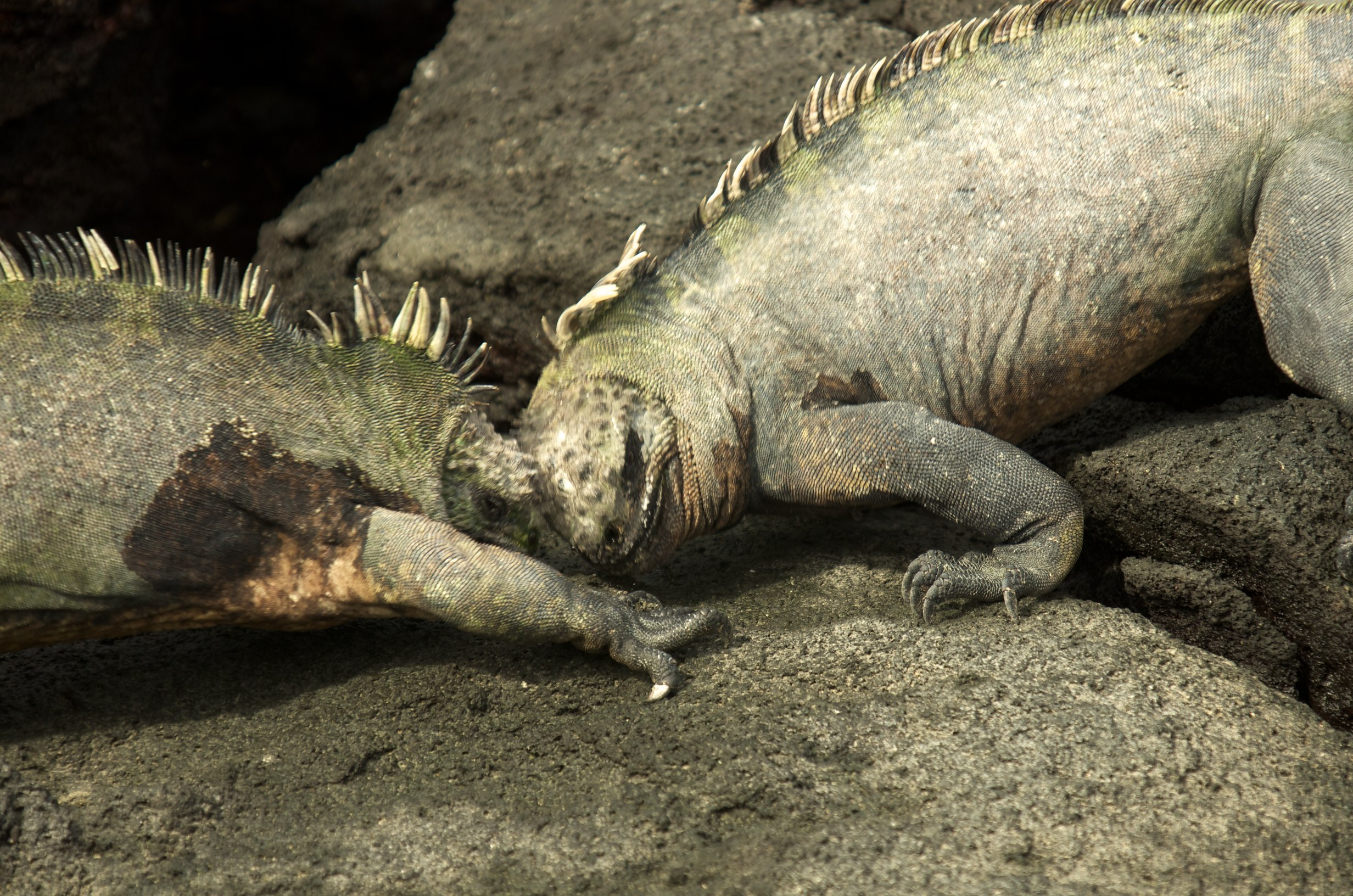
During territorial fights males headbutt, each attempting to push away the opponent

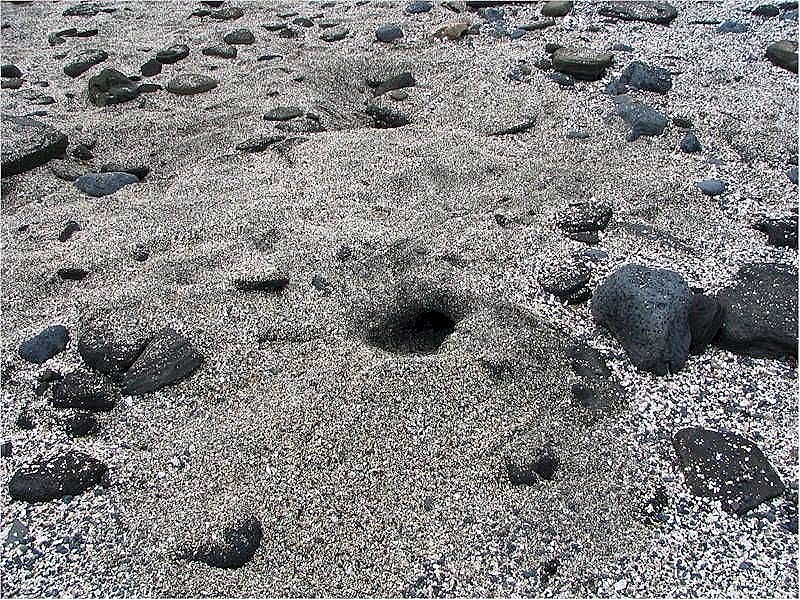
A marine iguana nest hole (center of image)

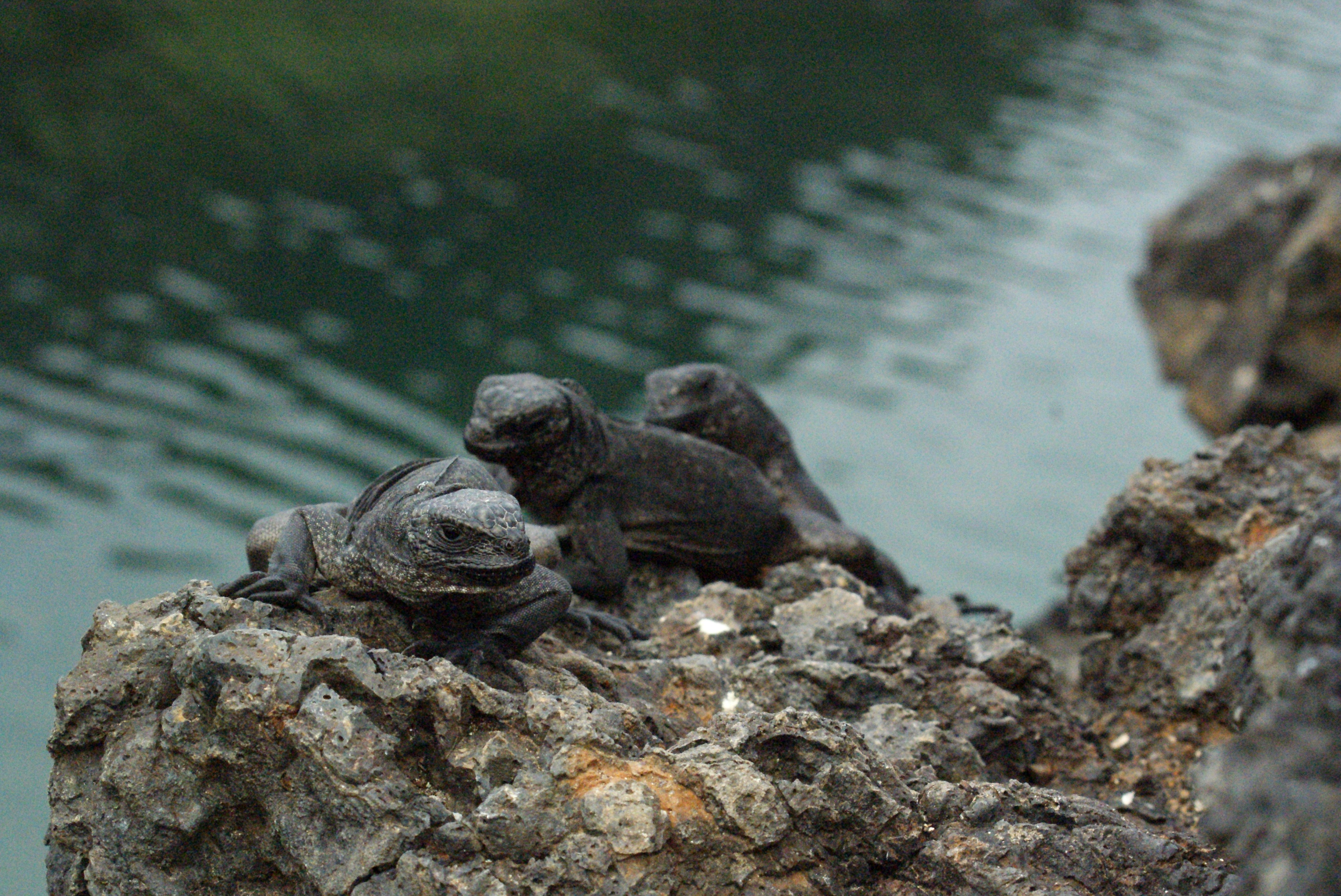
Juveniles on Isabela Island

Female marine iguanas reach sexual maturity at the age of 3–5 years, while males reach sexual maturity at the age of 6–8 years. Sexual maturity is marked by the first steep and abrupt decline in bone growth cycle thickness. Marine iguanas can reach an age of up to 60 years, but average lifespan is 12 years or less.

Reproduction in the marine iguana begins during the last part of the cold and dry season, with breeding from December to March and nesting from January to April. The exact timing varies with location, depending on algal growth and the nutrient-rich Cromwell Current. It occurs earliest on islands like Fernandina, Isabela, Santa Fé and Genovesa, and latest on islands like Española. An adult marine iguana, whether male or female, will typically breed every other year, but if there is plenty of food a female may breed each year.

Marine iguanas live in coastal colonies that typically range from 20 to 500 animals, but sometimes more than 1,000. Their bodies often touch each other, but there are no social interactions like grooming, as commonly seen in social mammals and birds. Females are always highly gregarious and males are gregarious outside the breeding season. However, large males defend territories for up to three months during the breeding season, and in this period they sometimes fight other males. A territory can be up to almost 40 m^{2} (430 ft^{2}), but is usually less than half that size, and can be as small as 1 m^{2} (11 ft^{2}). A territory is often delimited by geographic features, like boulders or crevices. The territories tend to occur in clusters with several located adjacent to each other, forming a lek, but they can occur singly. Medium-sized males roam areas near the territories of large males or walk along beaches looking for females, while small "sneaky" males may enter the territories of large males. To threaten another male, a male will bob his head, walk on stiff legs, raise the spiny crest along the back and open the mouth to reveal the reddish interior. In most cases the suitor will turn away, but if he responds with the same behavior a fight ensues. During fights they typically do not bite each other, instead thrusting their heads together in an attempt to push the other away. The bony plates on the top of their heads are especially suited for interlocking. Fights between males may last for hours, and are often interrupted by periodic breaks. Once a winner has been established through the headbutting, the loser assumes a submissive position and retreats. In general fights between males are harmless and highly ritualized, but on occasion they will bite and injure each other.

Males are primarily selected by females on the basis of their body size. Females display a stronger preference for mating with bigger males. It is precisely because of body size that reproductive performance increases and "is mediated by higher survival of larger hatchlings from larger females and increased mating success of larger males." Other factors involved in the female's choice of partner are the display frequency by a male (especially head-bobbing) and the quality of a male's territory. Females prefer male territories that include or are near their own resting places, which they choose based on proximity to the sea, access to shade, low midday temperature and the possibility of sunbathing in the afternoon. Males with territories that are near the center of the lek tend to have a greater mating success than males with peripheral territories, but the size of a territory does not affect mating success. Large territorial males that frequently display also emit higher levels of certain acidic compounds (including 11-Eicosenoic acid) from their femoral pores, which may function as pheromones that enhance their chance of attracting females. Females can move freely between different territories, but receive less harassment from opportunistic non-territorial males when inside another male's territory. Medium-sized males attempt to mate by force and small males by stealth and force, but they have a low mating success rate compared to the large males that maintain a territory. During courtship display, a territorial male nods at the female, may open his mouth, and performs a slow sideways walk towards her. If she accepts, the male will mount her while holding her by the neck. A mating lasts no more than 20 minutes, typically 3 to 4 minutes, but it is comparatively rapid in the small "sneaky" males, which easily are overlooked because their size, general morphology and colours are similar to those of a female. This rapid mating is necessary because large males will chase them out of their territory as soon as they are discovered. During each breeding season, a male will mate with many females if given the chance, but the female only mates once. Once a female has mated, she rejects other suitors by nodding her head at them.

Roughly one month after copulation, the female lays between one and six eggs, typically two or three. The leathery white eggs measure about 9 cm × 4.5 cm (3.5 in × 1.8 in) and weigh 80–120 g (2.8–4.2 oz). This is large for an iguana, and altogether the eggs may weigh up to one-quarter the weight of the female. The nest sites can be as much as 2 km (1.2 mi) inland, but typically are much closer to the coast. They are occasionally as little as 20 m (66 ft) inland, although they have to be above the high tide water mark. The nest is 30–80 cm (12–31 in) deep and dug in sand or volcanic ash by the female. On islands where there are few suitable sites and digging is difficult due to a relatively hard soil and many rocks, the female guards the nest for several days after the eggs have been buried, ensuring that they are not dug up by other nesting females. As in males defending their territory from other males, females defending their nest site from other females begin with a threat display. If this fails to scare the opponent away, the fights between females involve much biting and are less ritualized than the territorial fights between males. Where there are more suitable sites and the soil is loose, females are less likely to fight for a location and do not guard their nest after the eggs have been buried. The eggs hatch after about three to four months. The hatchlings are 9.5–13 cm (3.7–5.1 in) in snout-to-vent length, and weigh 40–70 g (1.4–2.5 oz). As soon as they emerge from the nest they run for cover, and begin their trip to locations that provides optimum conditions for feeding, temperature regulation and shelter. Some hatchlings have been recorded moving as far as 3 km (1.9 mi) in two days.

=== Feeding ===
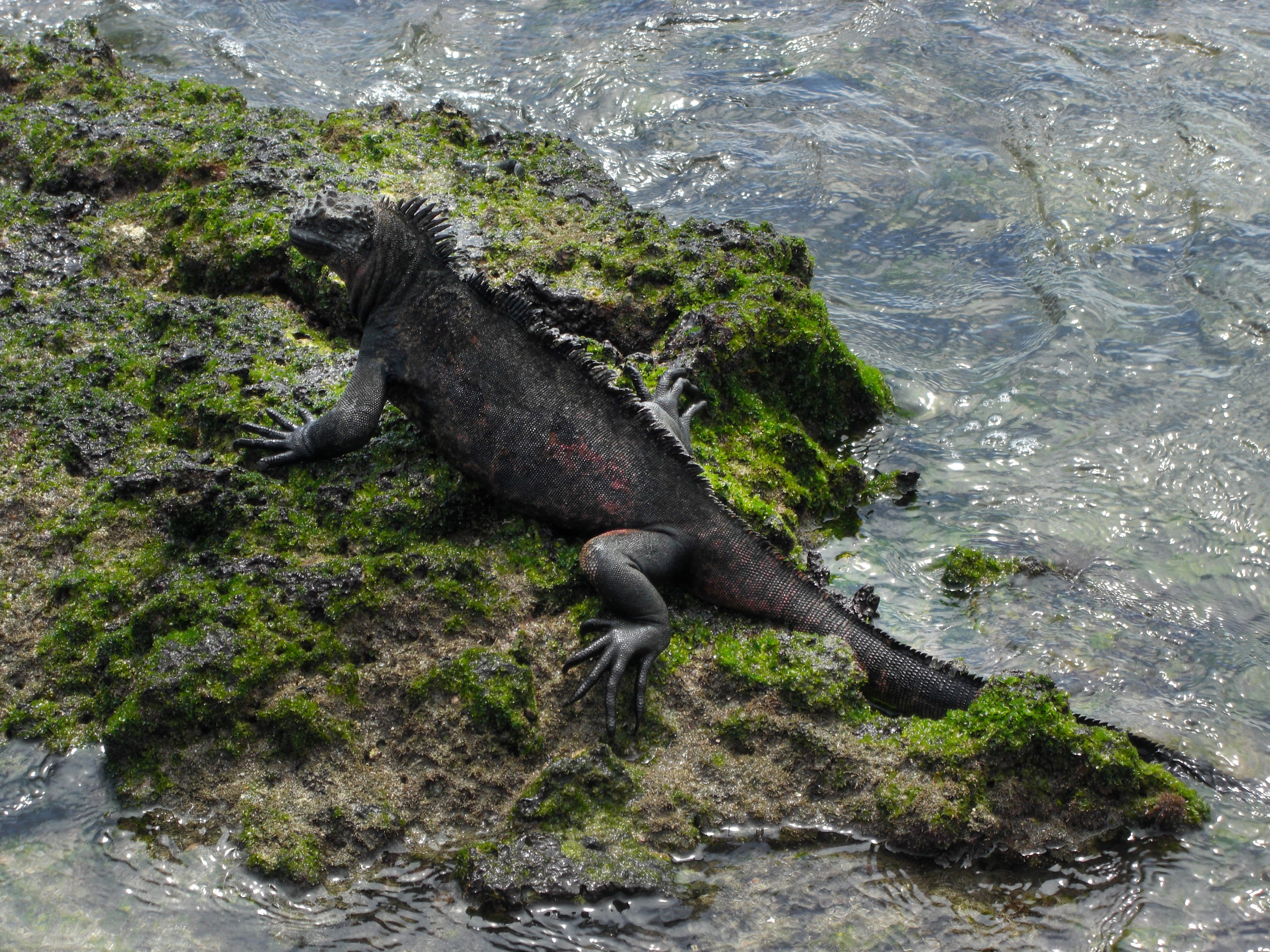
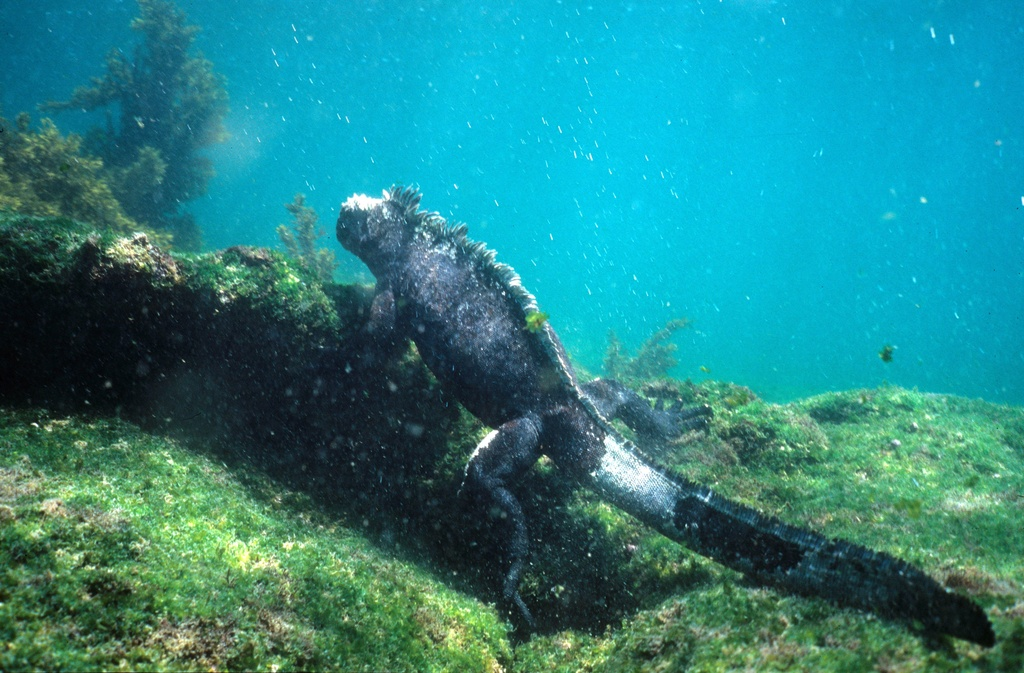
Females and small males forage in the intertidal zone on algae exposed during low tide (left), and large males forage for algae underwater at sea (right). These individuals both are on rocks covered in green algae.

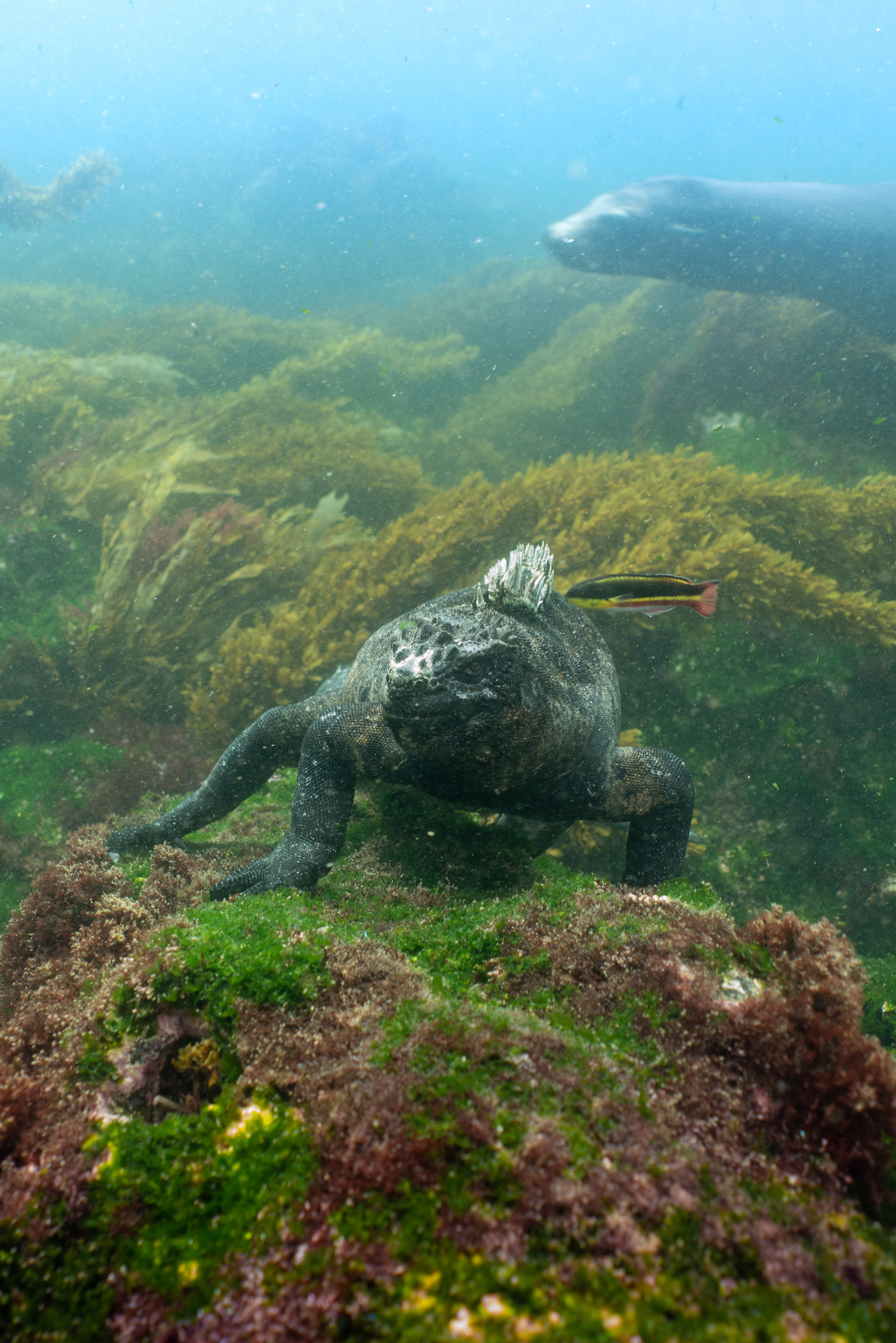
While feeding underwater, marine iguanas are sometimes cleaned by fish, like this Cortez rainbow wrasse. This iguana is on a rock covered in green and red algae, with the usually avoided brown algae behind it.

The marine iguana forages almost exclusively on red and green algae in the inter- and subtidal zones. At least 10 genera of algae are regularly consumed, including the red algae Centroceras, Gelidium, Grateloupia, Hypnea, Polysiphonia and Pterocladiella. In some populations, the green algae Ulva dominates the diet. The algal diet varies depending on algal abundance, individual preferences, foraging behaviour, season and exact island of feeding. Some species with chemical deterrents, such as Bifurcaria, Laurencia and Ochtodes, are actively avoided, but otherwise algal food choice mainly depends on energy content and digestibility. On Santa Cruz Island, 4–5 red algal species are the food of choice. During neap low tides, however, the usually avoided green algae Ulva lobata is eaten more often since the preferred red algae is not easily available. Brown algae have occasionally also been recorded in their diet, but marine iguanas are unable to easily digest these and will starve if it is the only type present. A 1 kg (2.2 lb) marine iguana typically eats about 8.6 g (0.30 oz) dry weight or 37.4 g (1.32 oz) fresh weight of algae per day. At Punta Espinoza on northeastern Fernandina Island it has been estimated that the almost 1,900 marine iguanas eat about 27–29 tonnes (27–29 long tons; 30–32 short tons) (fresh weight) of algae per year, a rate of consumption that is counterbalanced by the very high growth rate of the algae. They may feed on octopuses, crustaceans, insects (such as grasshoppers and cockroaches), fish carrion, and sea lion feces and afterbirth on rare occasions. The population on North Seymour Island will supplement their diet with land plants, primarily Batis maritima, or other coastal succulents like Sesuvium portulacastrum. These North Seymour iguanas have a higher survival rate during periods where their normal algal food is reduced. However, the hindgut of marine iguanas is specially adapted to algae feeding, likely restricting the possibility of efficiently switching to other plant types. The algae are digested with the help of endosymbiotic bacteria in their gut.

In the first months after hatching, the juveniles mainly feed on feces from larger marine iguanas, gaining the bacteria needed for digesting algae. It has been suggested that young iguanas up to about two years old are unable to swim, but studies have shown that even newly hatched marine iguanas are good swimmers; they just strongly try to avoid entering the water. At about 1–2 years old the young may voluntarily swim in shallow water and tide pools, but they do not dive.

Marine iguanas can dive as deep as 30 m (98 ft), and can spend up to one hour underwater. When diving to 7 m (23 ft) or deeper, they regularly remain submerged from 15 to more than 30 minutes. Most dives are much shorter in duration and shallower than 5 m (16 ft). Individuals foraging near-shore, often less than 1 m (3.3 ft) deep, typically only spend about 3 minutes underwater. Only 5% of marine iguanas dive for algae offshore and these individuals are the large males. The minimum size of these divers vary with island and subspecies, ranging from 0.6 kg (1.3 lb) on Genovesa Island (A. c. nanus) to 3 kg (6.6 lb) on Fernandina Island (A. c. cristatus). They are slow swimmers, averaging just 0.45 metres per second (1.5 ft/s). The highest recorded speed is only about twice that figure and this can typically only be sustained in bursts that last less than a minute. Most females and smaller males feed on exposed algae in the intertidal zone during low tide, retreating once the water returns and starts washing over them. They often scurry back-and-forth repeatedly, running to a patch of algae to take a few bites and then return fast to higher ground to avoid incoming waves. The separation in feeding behavior is advantageous because the large offshore feeding males experience less competition for food from smaller males and females. A few individuals of intermediate size may use both feeding strategies. In general, each marine iguana has a specific feeding site it returns to day after day. Most feed daily, but large offshore feeding males often only every second or third day. During bad weather with high waves marine iguanas do not feed, sometimes for more than a week. Large males often do not feed for several weeks when maintaining a breeding territory, resulting in them losing up to about one-quarter of their weight. It takes many months for them to return to their original weight. In captivity, individuals have remained strong and active even after fasting for as much as 100 days.

Foraging behavior changes in accordance to the seasons and foraging efficiency increases with temperature. These environmental changes and the ensuing occasional food unavailability have caused marine iguanas to evolve by acquiring efficient methods of foraging in order to maximize their energy intake and body size. During an El Niño cycle in which food diminished for two years, some were found to decrease their length by as much as 20%. When food supply returned to normal, iguana size followed suit. It is speculated that the bones of the iguana actually shorten as shrinkage of connective tissue could only account for a 10% change in length.

Marine iguanas have several adaptions that aid their feeding. Their flattened tail is the primary means of propulsion in the water. When on the surface, they may use their legs for maintaining balance. Although their partially webbed feet often are mentioned, this webbing is very marginal and no greater in extent than in the green iguana, a species that also shares the flattened tail. Marine iguanas have powerful limbs with long, sharp claws for climbing, holding onto rocks and pulling themselves forward when at the sea bottom (adding to the propulsion provided by the tail). They are buoyant and float to the ocean surface if they are not actively swimming or holding on to rocks underwater. However, they have unusually compact (osteosclerose) limb bones compared to the land iguana, especially those from the front limbs, providing ballast to help with diving.

Other adaptions in marine iguanas are blunt heads (flat noses) and sharp teeth allowing them to graze algae off of rocks more easily. Together with a few Ctenosaurus species, it is the only iguana that never has more than three tips (tricuspid) on each tooth. Uniquely, the side-tips on the marine iguana's teeth are quite large, only somewhat smaller than the central tip. It also appears to replace its teeth at a higher rate than other iguanas. As a sea reptile, much salt is ingested. The salt is filtered from their blood and then excreted by specialised cranial exocrine glands at the nostrils, expelled from the body in a process much like sneezing. The marine iguana's cranium has an unusually large nasal cavity compared to other iguanas, which is necessary to accommodate the large salt glands. The head may appear white from encrusted salt.

=== Mutualism and commensalism with other animals ===
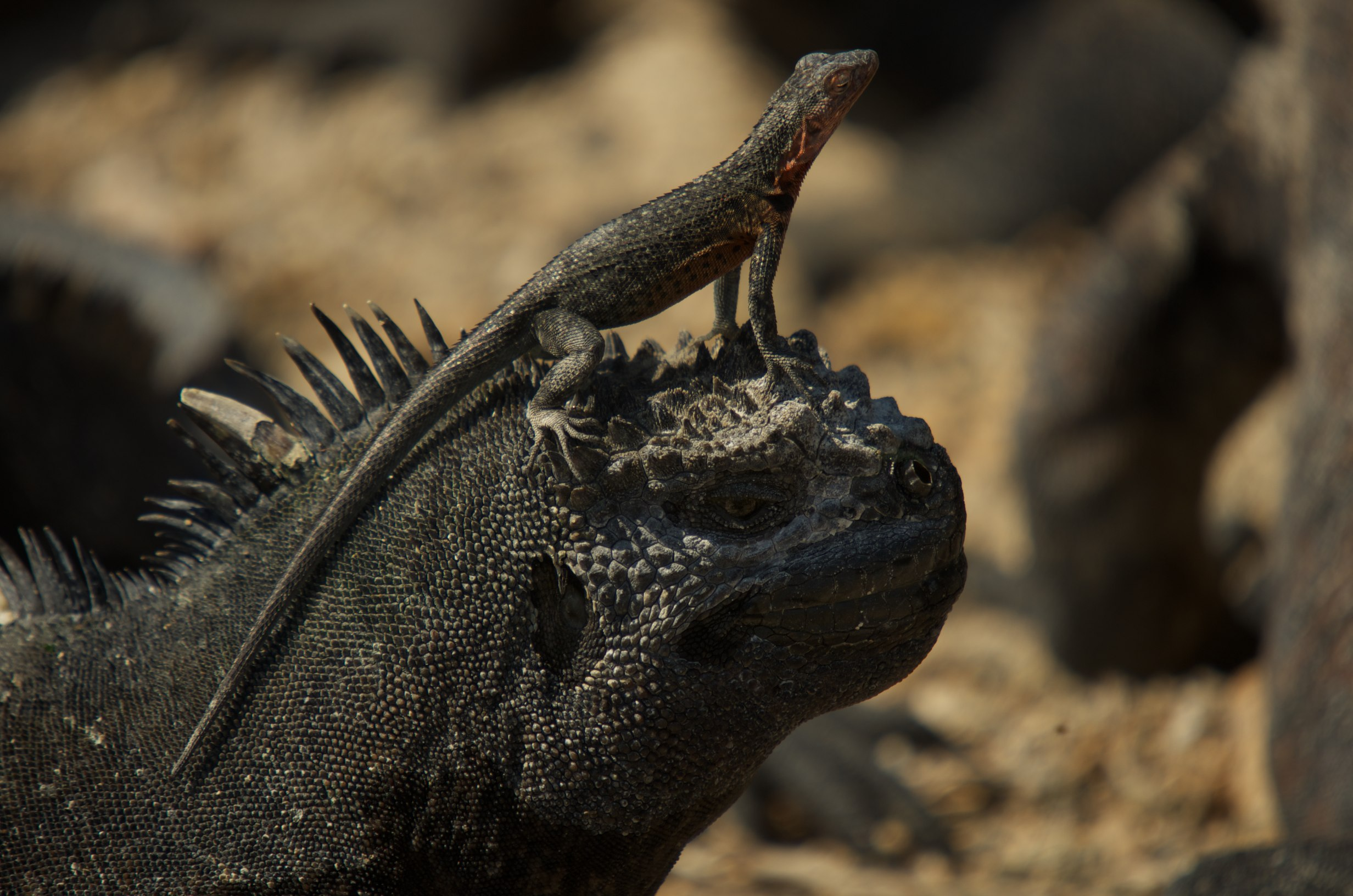
Lava lizards often scurry over marine iguanas when hunting flies; the iguanas generally ignore these visits

Marine iguanas have mutualistic and commensal relationships with several other animals. Lava lizards may scurry over marine iguanas when hunting flies, and Darwin's finches, mockingbirds and Sally lightfoot crabs sometimes feed on mites and ticks that they pick off their skin. Marine iguanas typically ignore these visits. When underwater, they are often cleaned by fish, like Pacific sergeant majors that pick off moulting skin. Although there are no apparent benefits to either species, marine iguanas commonly live close together with the much larger Galápagos sea lions. The two species generally ignore each other and an iguana may even crawl over the body of a sea lion.

=== Thermoregulation ===
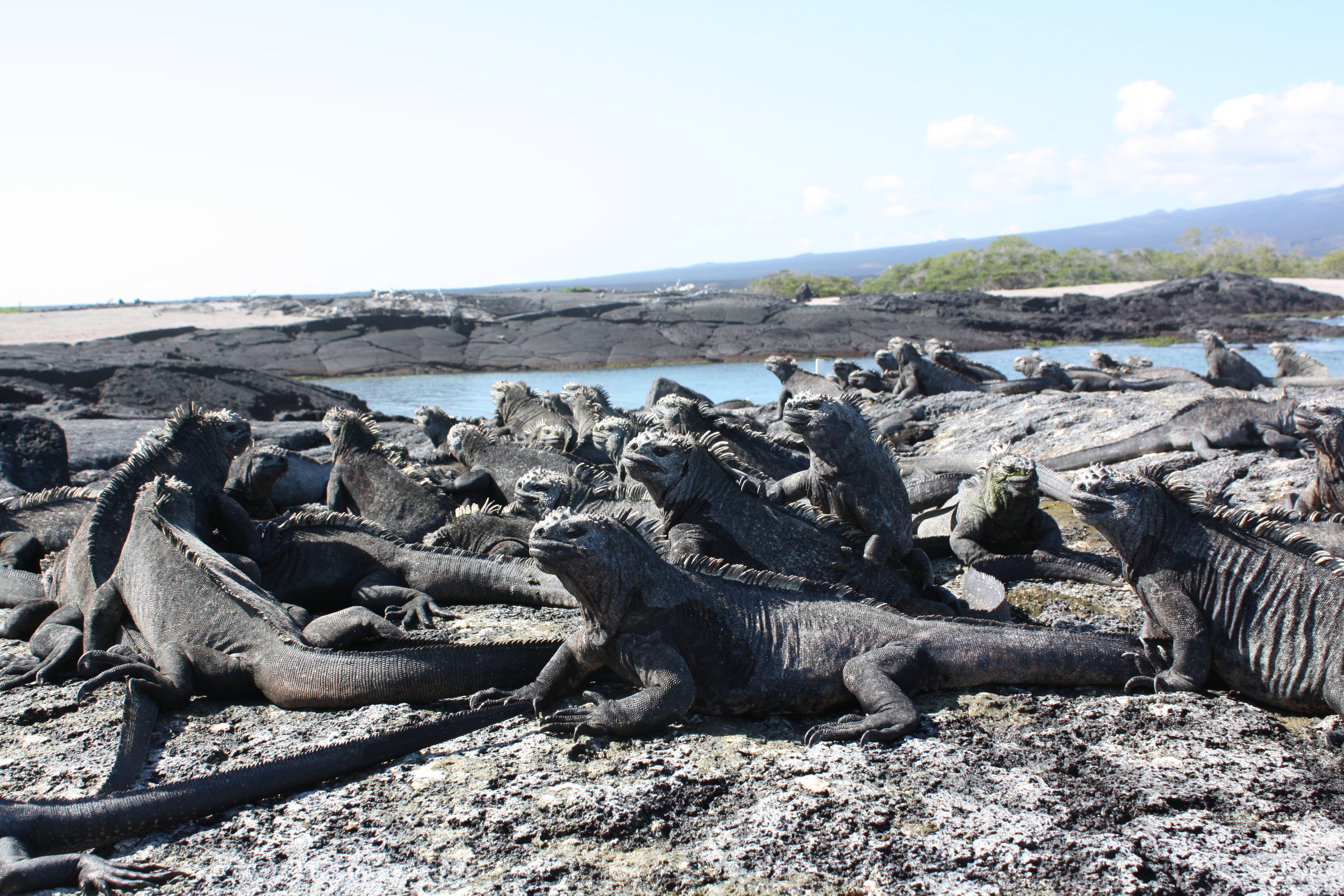
Marine iguanas basking on Fernandina Island

Marine iguanas are unique as they are marine reptiles that forage on inter- and subtidal algae almost exclusively. They forage in the relatively cold waters around the Galápagos Islands, which typically are between 11 and 23 °C (52–73 °F) at the sea surface. As their preferred body temperature is from 35 to 39 °C (95–102 °F) and the temperature declines throughout a foraging trip to the sea, sometimes by as much as 10 °C (18 °F), the marine iguana has several behavioral adaptations for thermoregulation. At cold temperatures their muscles are less efficient, but their relatively high temperature preference is also related to the optimal temperature for digesting the algal food in their gut.

As an ectothermic animal, the marine iguana can spend only a limited time in cold water diving for algae. Afterwards it basks in the sun to warm up. Until it can do so it is unable to move effectively, making it vulnerable to predation. However, this is counteracted by their highly aggressive nature consisting of biting and expansive bluffs when in this disadvantageous state. Their dark shade aids in heat reabsorption. In colder periods with cloudy weather and much wind, juveniles will stay in the lee of rocks, still gaining the heat from the sun. Adults may move inland to low-lying sites with less wind because of bushes and lava ridges but still exposed to direct sun. When in the water and their temperature is falling, their blood circulation is reduced because of a low heart rate of about 30 beats per minute, allowing them to better conserve their warmth. When on land and heating up, the higher heart rate of about 100 beats per minute aids in spreading the heat throughout the body. To conserve heat during the night, they often sleep closely together in groups that may number up to 50 individuals, while others sleep alone below plants or in crevices.

In general, the time of each foraging trip is directly related to the water temperature; the colder the water the shorter the foraging trip. Additionally, marine iguanas that forage in or near the intertidal zone prefer to do so during low tides, allowing them to remain on land (on rocks exposed by the tide) or return to land faster. Individuals that forage further from the shore by diving are large males, which mainly feed during the hot midday (although it may occur from late morning to early evening), are less affected by the cool water because of their body size and are more efficient swimmers.

Under the tropical sun, overheating can also be a problem. To avoid this, they pant, and adopt a posture where they face the sun and lift their body up, thereby exposing as little as possible of their body to direct sun and allowing cooling air to pass underneath.

== Conservation ==
=== Status and threats ===
The marine iguana has a relatively small range and is currently considered vulnerable by the IUCN. Most subpopulations have the same IUCN rating, but those of San Cristóbal, Santiago and Genovesa Islands are considered endangered.

On some shorelines they can be very numerous, with densities as high as 8,000 per kilometer (almost 13,000 per mile), and their biomass compared to the area they occupy may surpass that of any known reptile. However, their distribution is patchy, and colonies are generally found within 100 m (330 ft) of the ocean, naturally limiting their range. The total population for the entire archipelago is estimated to be 200,000–300,000 individuals, although this number is labelled with considerable uncertainty. Most subpopulations have not been surveyed in detail because their lifestyle and habitat make it difficult to survey with a high level of accuracy. By far the largest subpopulation—likely including around 2/5 of all marine iguanas—lives on Fernandina Island, but estimates vary greatly from 15,000 to 120,000 individuals. In contrast, the maximum size of the subpopulations on the islands of San Cristóbal, Darwin and Pinzon is estimated to be 400, 800 and 900, respectively. It is estimated that Marchena Island has 4,000–10,000 marine iguanas, Rabida Island has 1,000–2,000 and Santa Fé Island has 15,000–30,000. Although individuals may on occasion be transferred between islands by ocean currents, marine iguanas are unable to swim between all but the nearest islands in the archipelago because of their slow speed and limited stamina in the relatively cold water.

The periodic El Niño events reduce the cold water needed for algae to grow and this can drastically reduce the marine iguana population, on some islands with as much as 90%. Population recoveries after El Niños are fast; even when reduced by 30–50%, the population is generally able to recover within four years. However, recoveries can be partially impeded by the invasive brown algae Giffordia mitchelliae. When their food algae (red and green algae) disappears during El Niños, the areas may be taken over by this brown algae, causing starvation among the marine iguanas. With global warming, it is expected that El Niño events will be stronger and occur more frequently.

Introduced predators, to which they have little or no protection, include animals such as pigs, dogs, cats and rats. Dogs may take adult marine iguanas, while the others may feed on their young or eggs. This inhibits reproduction and the long-term survival of the species. Introduced predators represent a major problem on the islands of Santa Cruz, Santiago, Isabela, Floreana and San Cristóbal where very few marine iguana hatchlings survive. Marine iguanas are ecologically naïve and have not developed efficient anti-predator strategies against the introduced species. For example, the first dogs were introduced to the Galápagos Islands more than 100 years ago, but marine iguanas have not developed an anti-predator strategy against them. In general, native predators represent a less serious threat to the marine iguana. Natural land predators include the Galápagos hawk, short-eared owl, lava gull, herons and Galápagos racer snakes that may take small marine iguanas. When swimming, marine iguanas are occasionally attacked and eaten by sharks, although the two often behave indifferently to each other, even when close together. Of the native predators, the Galápagos hawk is likely the most important, and it may also take weakened adults (not just young), but this hawk is quite rare with a total population numbering only a few hundred individuals. Marine iguanas have anti-predator strategies that reduce the impact of the Galápagos hawk, including an increased vigilance when hearing the alarm call of the Galápagos mockingbird, another species that is sometimes preyed upon by the hawk.

Marine iguanas can easily be approached by humans as they are very tame and generally make little or no attempt to escape. Individuals that have been caught before are only slightly more wary when again encountering humans. Even when repeatedly caught and deliberately mishandled each time, they do not attempt to bite or lash with their tail in self-defense (although the sharp claws can cause painful scratches when the iguana attempts to gain a grip) and only move a few feet once released, allowing themselves to be caught again with ease. Pathogens introduced to the archipelago by humans pose a serious threat to this species. The marine iguana has evolved over time in an isolated environment and lacks immunity to many pathogens. As a result, the iguanas are at higher risk of contracting infections, contributing to their threatened status.

Occasional oil spills in the region also present a threat. For example, the Santa Fé population was reduced by almost 2/3 as a result of the MV Jessica oil spill in 2001, and even low-level oiling may kill marine iguanas. It is suspected that the primary cause of death during these events is starvation due to the loss of their sensitive gut bacteria, which they rely on to digest algae.

=== Protection ===
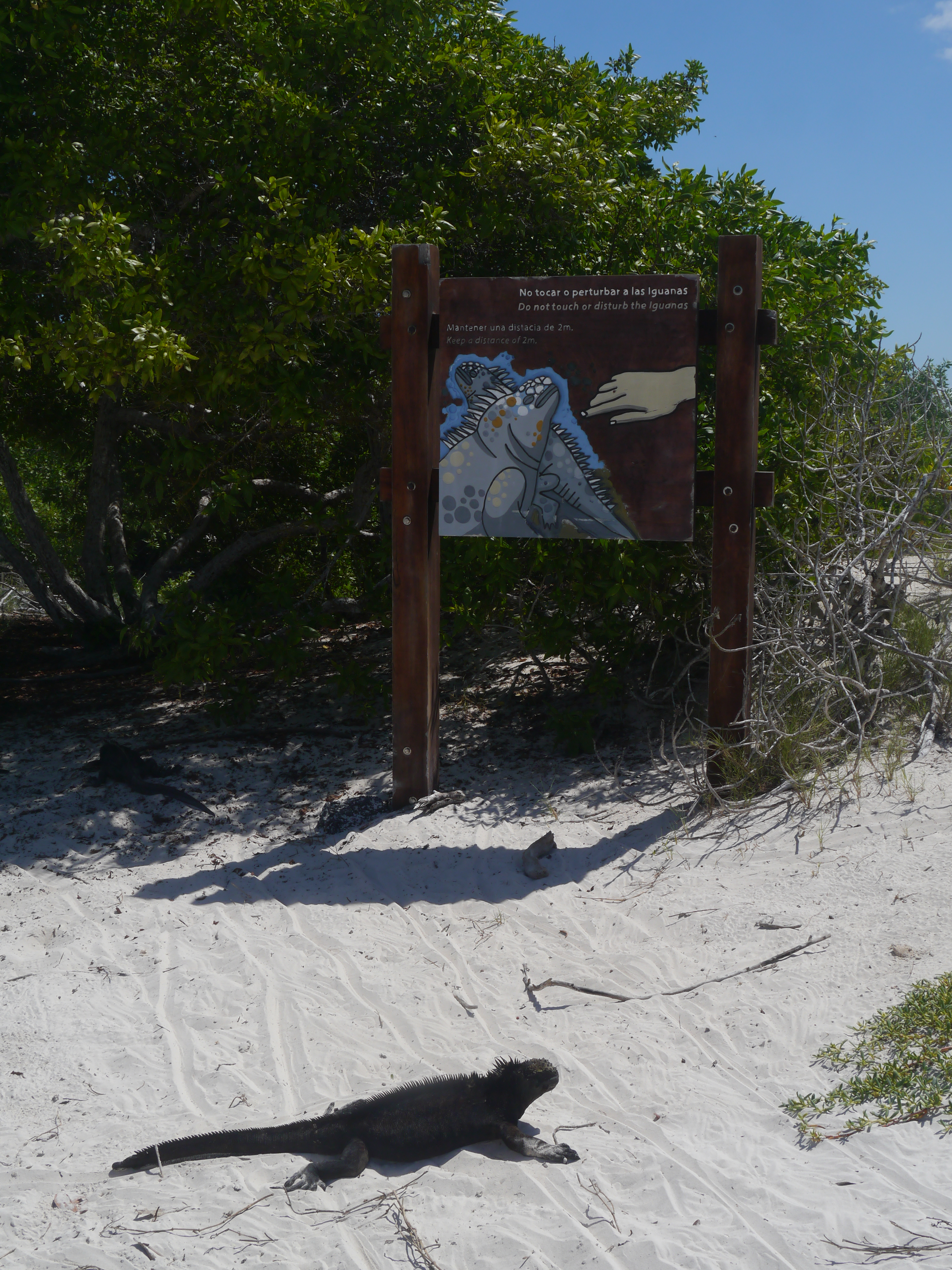
Sign at Tortuga Bay warning people to not disturb the marine iguanas and keep a distance of at least 2 m (6.6 ft)

The marine iguana is completely protected under the laws of Ecuador, and is listed under CITES Appendix II. Almost all its land range is in the Galápagos National Park (only the 3% human-inhabited sections in the archipelago are excluded) and all its sea range is in the Galápagos Marine Reserve. Certain coastal roads have lower speed limits to reduce the risk posed by cars, especially to the young. There have been attempts of removing introduced predators from some places, but this has not been without problems. Feral dogs mostly feed on large marine iguanas, but also limit the feral cat population. When feral dogs are removed feral cats can thrive and they feed on small marine iguanas. In 2012, the last black rats were eradicated from Pinzón Island.

Studies and research have been done on marine iguanas that can help and promote conservation efforts to preserve the endemic species. Monitoring levels of marine algae, both dimensionally and hormonally, is an effective way to predict the fitness of the marine iguana species. Exposure to tourism affects marine iguanas, and corticosterone levels can predict their survival during El Niño events. Corticosterone levels in species measure the stress that they face in their populations. Marine iguanas show higher stress-induced corticosterone concentrations during famine (El Niño) than feast conditions (La Niña). The levels differ between the islands, and show that survival varies throughout them during an El Niño event. The variable response of corticosterone is one indicator of the general public health of the populations of marine iguanas across the Galápagos Islands, which is a useful factor in the conservation of the species.

Another indicator of fitness is the levels of glucocorticoid. Glucocorticoid release is considered beneficial in helping animals survive stressful conditions, while low glucocorticoid levels are an indicator of poor body condition. Species undergoing a large measure of stress, resulting in elevated glucocorticoid levels can cause complications such as reproduction failure. Human activity has been considered a cause of elevated levels of glucocorticoid in species. Results of a study show that marine iguanas in areas central to tourism are not chronically stressed, but do show lower stress response compared to groups undisturbed by tourism. Tourism, thus, does affect the physiology of marine iguanas. Information of glucocorticoid levels are good monitors in predicting long term consequences of human impact.

Although marine iguanas have been kept in captivity, the specialised diet represents a challenge. They have lived for more than a decade in captivity, but have never bred under such conditions. The development of a captive breeding program (as already exists for the Galápagos land iguana) possibly is a necessity if all the island subspecies are to survive.

== Gallery ==
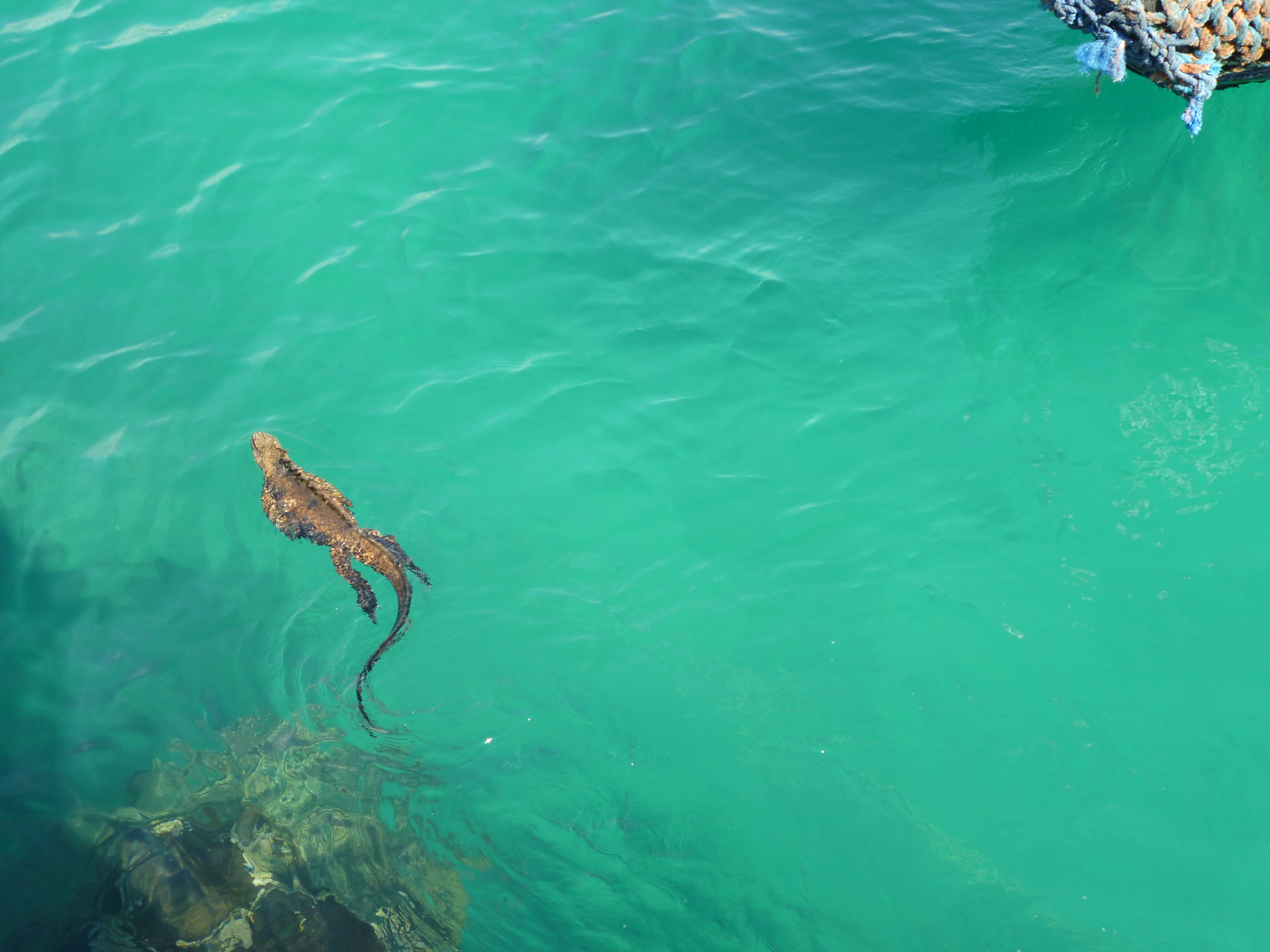
A marine iguana swimming at sea near Puerto Ayora, the most populous town in the Galápagos

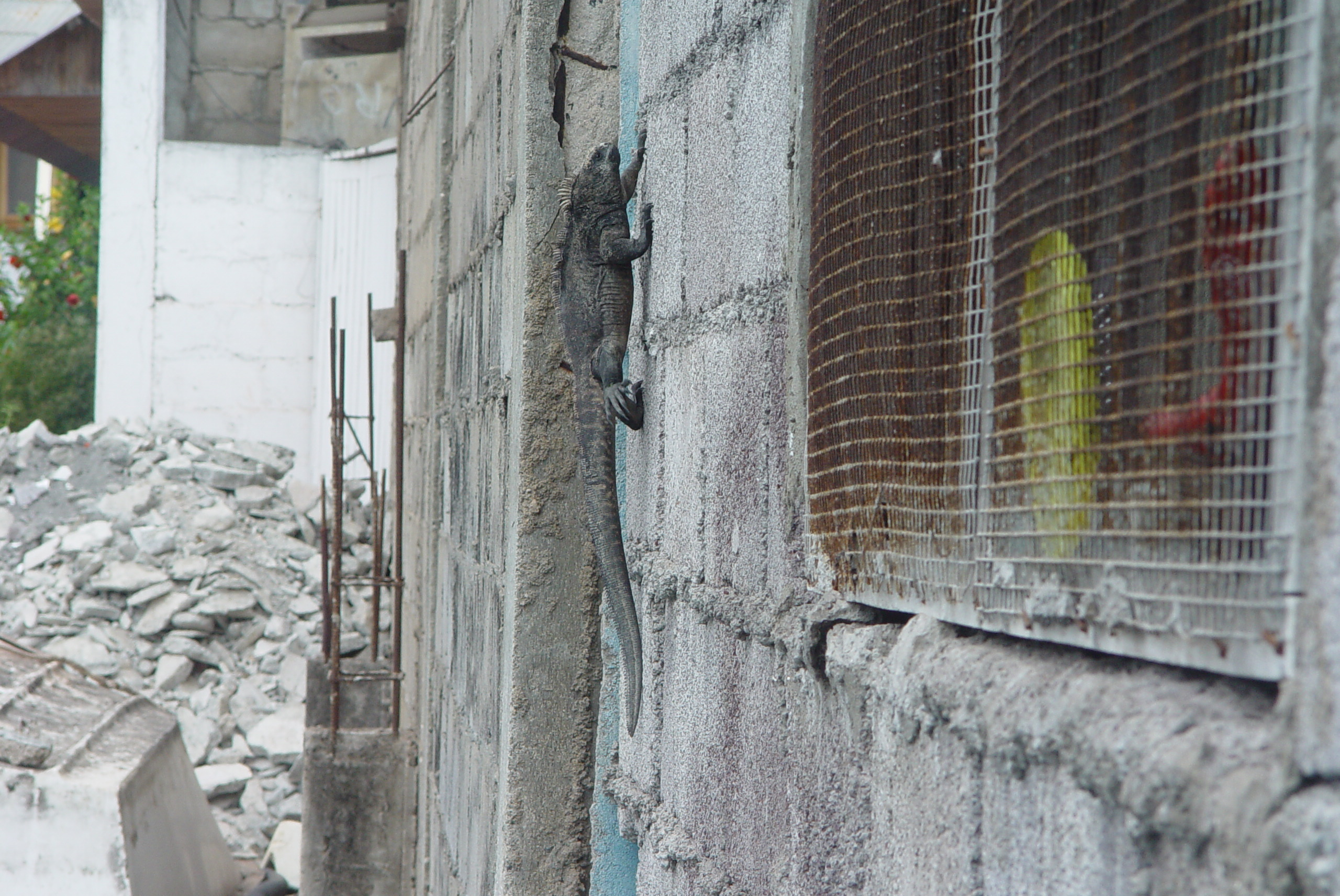
Marine iguanas may even enter the town of Puerto Ayora, like this individual demonstrating its climbing ability on a wall.

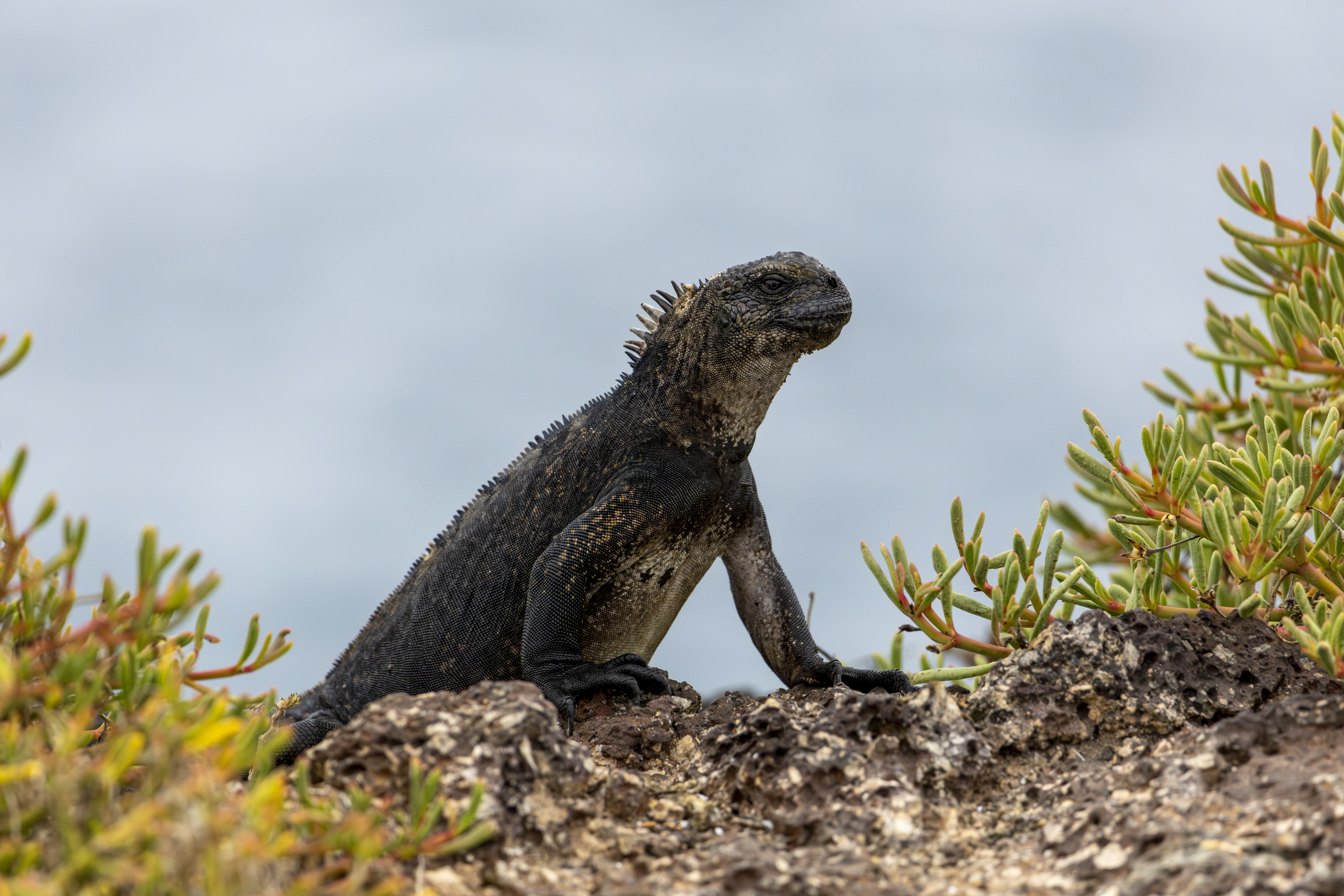
Juvenile perched on a ledge on South Plaza Island

== See also ==
- Planet Earth II – TV show on which Galapagos racers hunting marine iguana hatchlings became a viral trend.
- Godzilla (1998), an American science fiction action film where a Marine Iguana is mutated via radiation into a large bipedal creature that terrorizes New York City.
