= Galápagos Marine Reserve =

Nature reserve off the Ecuadorian mainland

Coordinates: 0°03′13″S 90°46′09″W

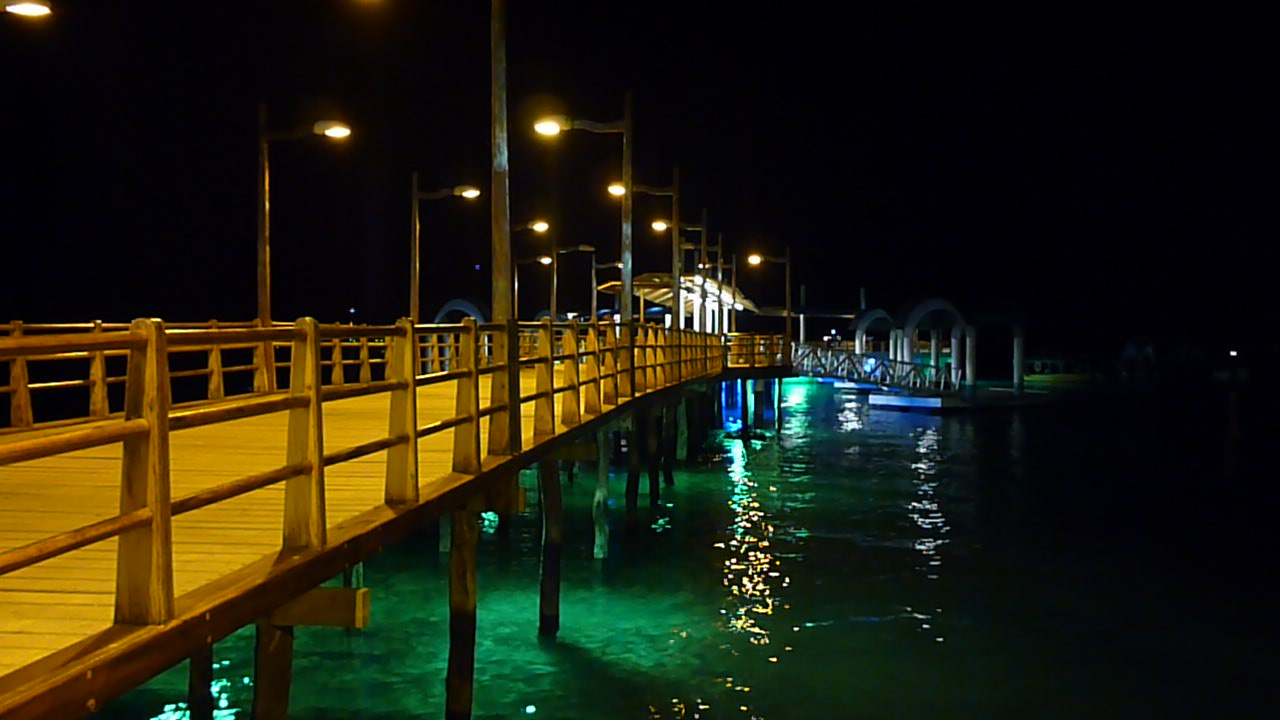
Puerto Ayora at night on the Island of Santa Cruz in the Galapagos Islands in Ecuador

The Galápagos Marine Reserve (GMR) lies a thousand kilometres from the Ecuadorian mainland and covers an area of around 133,000 km^{2} (51,000 sq mi). The Galápagos Islands and the surrounding waters represent one of the world’s most unusual ecosystems and are rich areas of biodiversity. Recently granted UNESCO World Heritage Site status, the Galápagos Marine Reserve is the largest marine reserve in a developing country and the second largest reserve in the world.

== Snorkeling and diving ==
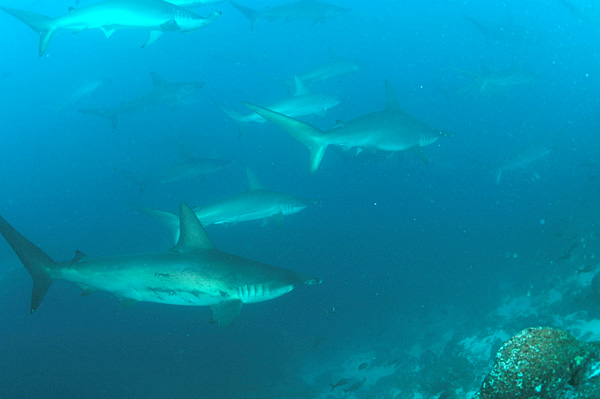
School of scalloped hammerheads at Wolf Island in the Galapagos Islands

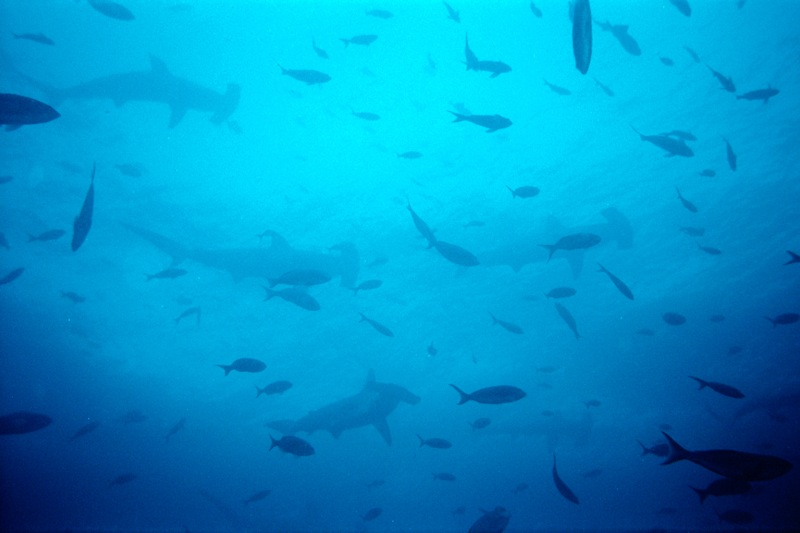
Another school of scalloped hammerheads at Wolf Island, Galapagos

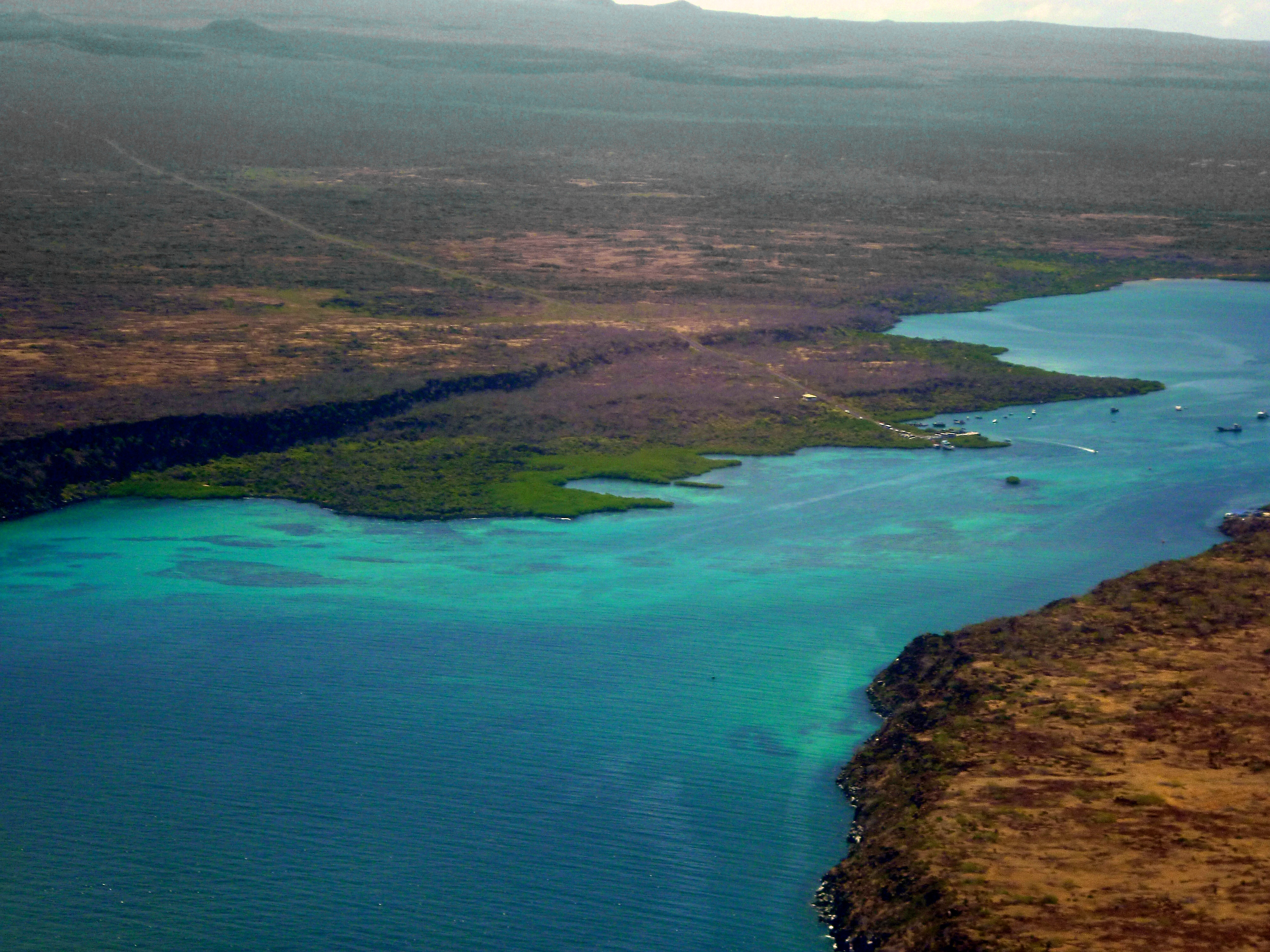
From the plane of an Airbus A320, flying out Baltra Island (on the right) and Santa Cruz Island (on the left) and between the two islands is the Itabaca Channel an area filled with water taxis taking people in between and to waiting boats off shore waiting for multi day cruises.

In certain areas in the Galápagos Marine Reserve, it is possible for visitors to dive or snorkel, and many guests have come into contact with diverse aquatic species which live underwater: Whales, whale sharks, hammerhead sharks, rays, manta rays, swordfish and sea turtles, etc. Other habitats within the GMR are the rocky seabed, vertical rock faces, sandy beaches, mangrove swamps and, to a lesser extent, coral reefs. A popular spot is Tortuga Bay on the Island of Santa Cruz where there is a separate mangrove where there are always white tip reef sharks

== Animal life ==
Coastal lakes, moist soil and areas where freshwater and seawater mix contain unique species still to be studied. Cold, hot and warm marine currents come together here, generating a wide diversity of animal life: from small coloured fish to large mammals: marine iguanas, Galapagos land iguanas, galapagos crabs, Galápagos sea lion, Sharks, Blue footed boobie, swallow-tailed gulls, ducks, frigatebirds and the galápagos tortoise. The most unique species to the Galápagos is the Marine Iguana, due to its amphibious nature. It is the only known reptilian lizard that can forage in water and on land.

== Environmental threats ==
The Galápagos Marine Reserve faces a number of environmental threats. The most pressing threats to the GMR come from over-fishing and illegal fishing. Some animals are always illegal to hunt in the Galápagos. The legal local sea cucumber and lobster fisheries are heavily depleted and may be close to collapse. This poses dire consequences for the oversubscribed fishing sector in Galápagos, likely causing local fishermen to turn increasingly to illegal practices, such as shark finning, overfishing of tuna, and illegal export of sea cucumbers. Non-native species, such as cats and dogs, have also begun to pose a major threat to the fragile ecosystem found in the GMR.

== Pollution and development ==
Pollution and development pose an additional threat to both terrestrial and marine wildlife. The concurrent growth of the tourism industry and local populations means this problem will certainly increase. The population of Galápagos is growing at a rate of approximately 6% per year, more than double population growth of mainland Ecuador. The grounding of the tanker Jessica, delivering bunker fuel and diesel for tourist boats and the Ecuadorian Navy, brought world attention to the marine threats from increased human activities on the Islands.

== Conservation efforts ==
Many international conservation and science organizations are working to protect the Galápagos Marine Reserve. Among them are the Charles Darwin Foundation and WildAid, which is working to improve the capacity of the Parque Nacional de Galápagos staff to protect the reserve from overfishing and other threats.

The Sea Shepherd Conservation Society also maintains an office in Puerto Ayora, on the island of Santa Cruz.

In November 2021, President Guillermo Lasso announced the expansion of the reserve by 50%, adding 23,000 sq mi (60,000 km^{2}) to protect submarine mountains northeast of the islands as the Hermandad Marine Reserve. It will connect with the protected area around Cocos Island.
