= MV Jessica =

Coordinates: 0.8961°S 89.6168°W

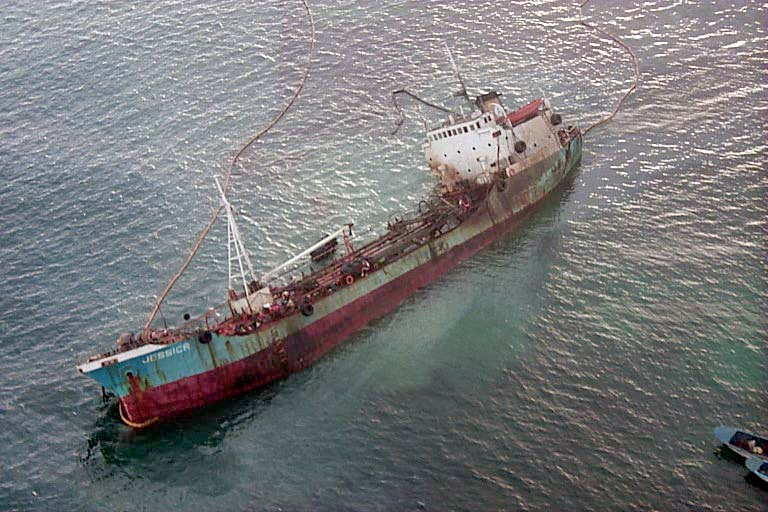
- Jessica, shipwrecked in 2001

History

Ecuador
- Name: Jessica
- Owner: Acotramar
- Fate: Ran aground, sunk

MV Jessica was an oil tanker that was involved in an oil spill in the Galápagos Islands, a chain of islands 972 km (525 nmi) west of continental Ecuador, of which they are a part. The ship was registered in Ecuador and owned by Acotramar. On the evening of 16 January 2001, Jessica ran aground at Wreck Bay, at the entrance to the port of Puerto Baquerizo Moreno, the capital of the Galápagos Province, located on the southwestern coast of San Cristóbal Island. The ship was carrying 600 tons (160,000 gallons) of diesel oil and 300 tons (80,000 gallons) of intermediate fuel oil. The diesel was destined for the fuel dispatch station on Baltra Island, while the fuel oil was destined for the tourist vessel Galapagos Explorer.

On 20 January, the fuel oil began to spill from Jessica. Recovery attempts began immediately, with the Ecuadorian Navy, the GNP, and local fishermen and volunteers containing and recovering the oil from the ocean surface. Oiled animals were attended to. On San Cristóbal, seven Galápagos sea lions and 17 birds (brown pelicans and blue-footed boobies) were affected by the fuel oil spill. On Santa Fe Island, a number of sea lions were affected and the marine iguana population was greatly reduced.

Due to lack of equipment and conditions at sea, the containment measures failed, and slicks drifted with the wind. A small beach on the southern side of Santa Cruz Island, as well as Tortuga Bay, were affected. The United States Coast Guard assisted in recovering the fuel oil remaining aboard the ship. A total of 175,000 US gallons (660,000 L) of diesel and fuel oil spilled into the sea; this was one of the worst environmental disasters in the archipelago's history.

Lynn W. Lougheed, a biologist studying with the Charles Darwin Foundation at the time, was in charge of coordinating the research on species affected by the spill of the MV Jessica.
