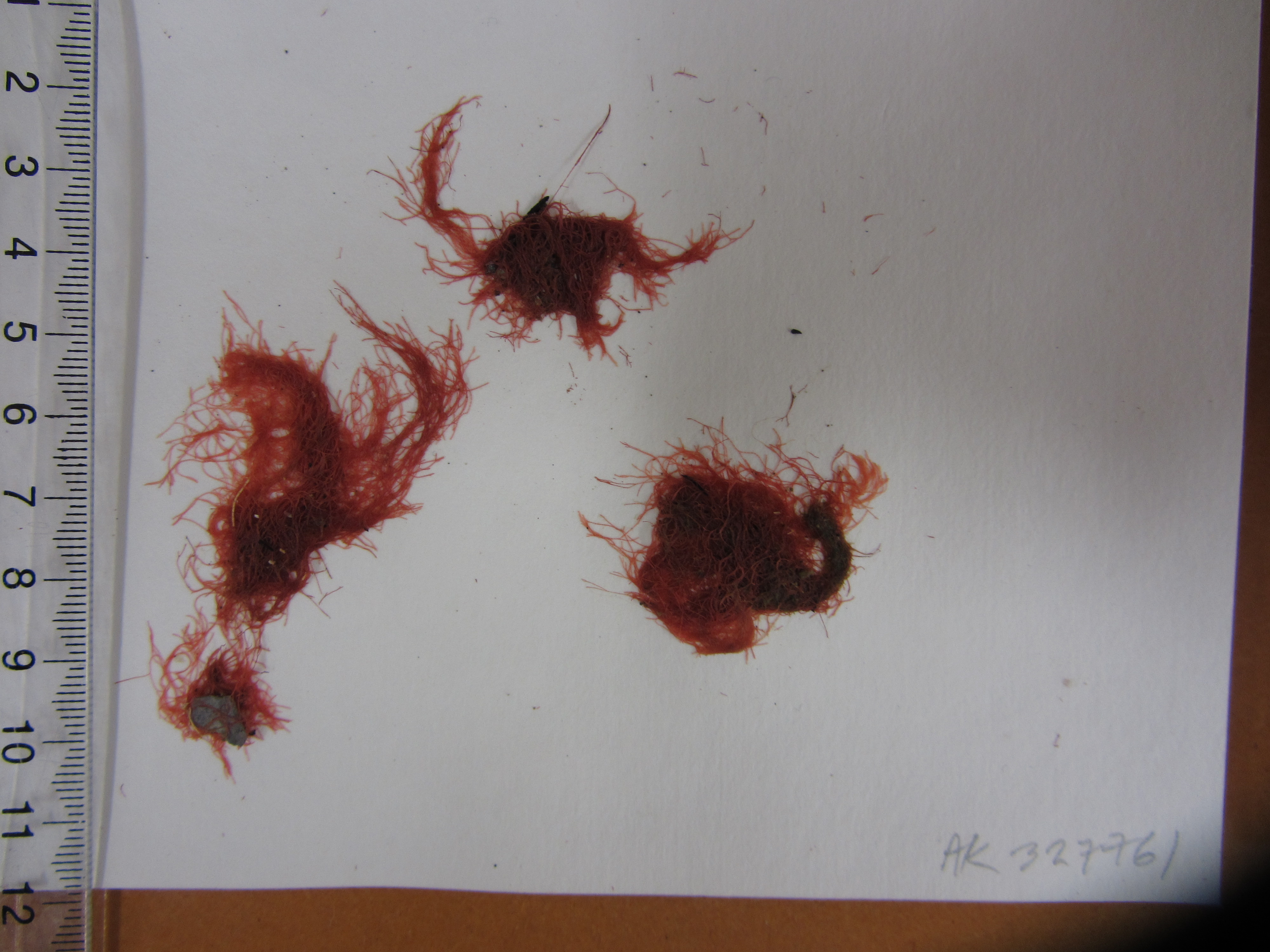
- Centroceras clavulatum

Scientific classification
- Clade: Archaeplastida
- Division: Rhodophyta
- Class: Florideophyceae
- Order: Ceramiales
- Family: Ceramiaceae
- Genus: Centroceras; Kützing, 1842 '1841'

= Centroceras (alga) =

Genus of algae

Centroceras is a genus of red algae belonging to the family Ceramiaceae.

== Species ==
Species:

- Centroceras apiculatum Yamada
- Centroceras arcii C.W.Schneider, Cianciola & Popolizio
- Centroceras bellum Setchell & N.L.Gardner
