= Mkwiro =

- Location within Kenya
- Coordinates: 4.67°S 39.4°E
- Country: Kenya
- Province: Coast Province
- Time zone: UTC+3 (EAT)

Mkwiro is a fishing village located on Wasini Island, 2 km off the Kenyan coast. It is easily seen from the shores of Shimoni, Kenya.

Mkwiro Primary School is the only school in the village, covering kindergarten and standards one through eight. Constantly running electricity is not sustainable, so most villagers do not have access to electricity. The community itself is a devout Muslim, thus very conservative and requires tourists to respect the dress code. Women must wear headscarves and cover their backs and shoulders; both men and women must cover their thighs above the knee.

Mkwiro is primarily a subsistence fishing village that utilizes several methods to catch fish: spear fishing, ring net fishing, line fishing, trap and aquarium fishing are among the most common ways in which local fisherman will catch fish in the area. Villagers in Mkwiro, Shimoni, and Wasini work very hard together with KWS to prevent any and all fishing in the Kisite-Mpunguti Marine Park and Reserve. Despite best efforts from the community and KWS, fishing still occurs within the Park's borders. Turtle by-catching whilst fishing is also a problem, as 5 out of the world's 7 species of turtles have been spotted in and around Wasini Channel. Mkwiro also benefits from seaweed farming. Dried seaweed is often exported to Asian markets. Priced at about 15 shillings per kilo of dried seaweed, Mkwiro villagers work very hard for a very low commission. Mkwiro is also becoming more receptive to the tourism industry.

On the opposite side of Wasini Island, Wasini Village is a tourism destination for visitors that take their lunches before and after dhow trips around the Marine Protected Areas, managed by the Kenya Wildlife Service (KWS). These dhow trips feature dolphin-watching, snorkeling, and speeches provided by the tour guides. Paradise Divers is a destination for lunch in Mkwiro. In Wasini Village, Charlie Claw's and Coral Spirit are the lunch destinations for tourists.
