= Sea purslane =

Sea purslane is a common name for several plants and may refer to:

- Halimione portulacoides, in family Amaranthaceae
- Honckenya peploides, in family Caryophyllaceae
- Sesuvium maritimum, in family Aizoaceae
- Sesuvium portulacastrum, in family Aizoaceae
