= Sesuvium trianthemoides =

Scientific classification
- Kingdom: Plantae
- Clade: Tracheophytes
- Clade: Angiosperms
- Clade: Eudicots
- Order: Caryophyllales
- Family: Aizoaceae
- Genus: Sesuvium
- Species: S. trianthemoides

Binomial name
- Sesuvium trianthemoides Correll
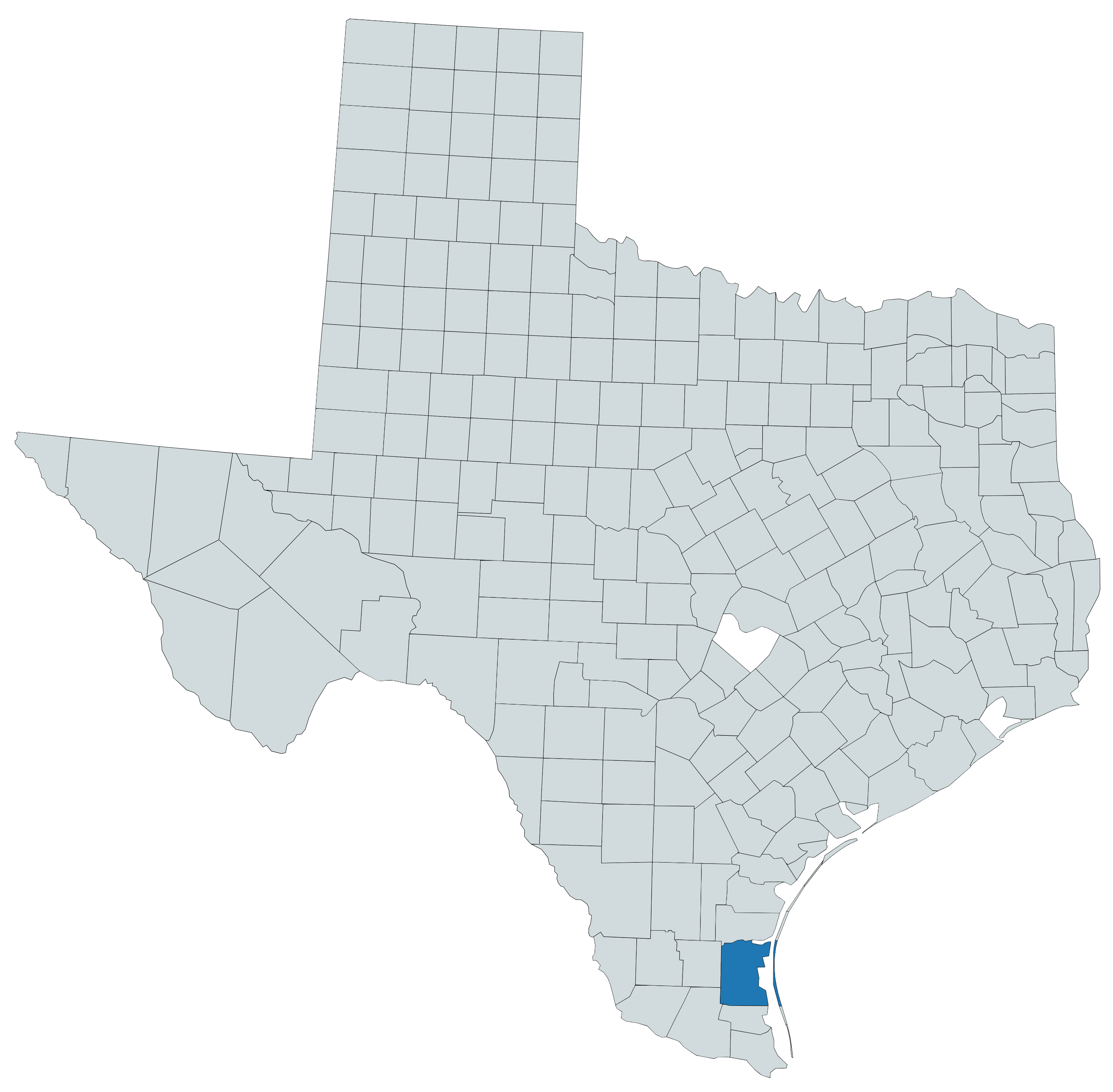
- Range of Sesuvium trianthemoides

Species of succulent

Sesuvium trianthemoides, called Texas sea-purslane, is a rare endemic plant known only from Kenedy County in southern Texas. It grows in salt marshes along the seacoast.

The species is closely related to the more widespread S. maritimum, referred to as annual or slender sea-purslane. This is common in coastal environments from Texas to New York State as well as in the West Indies. The two can be distinguished by smooth seeds about 1.0 mm across in S. maritimum, rough-surfaced seeds approximately 1.5 mm in diameter in S. trianthemoides. Both are small succulent herbs that form large clonal colonies by means of rhizomes.
