= Atchara =

Filpino unripe papaya pickle

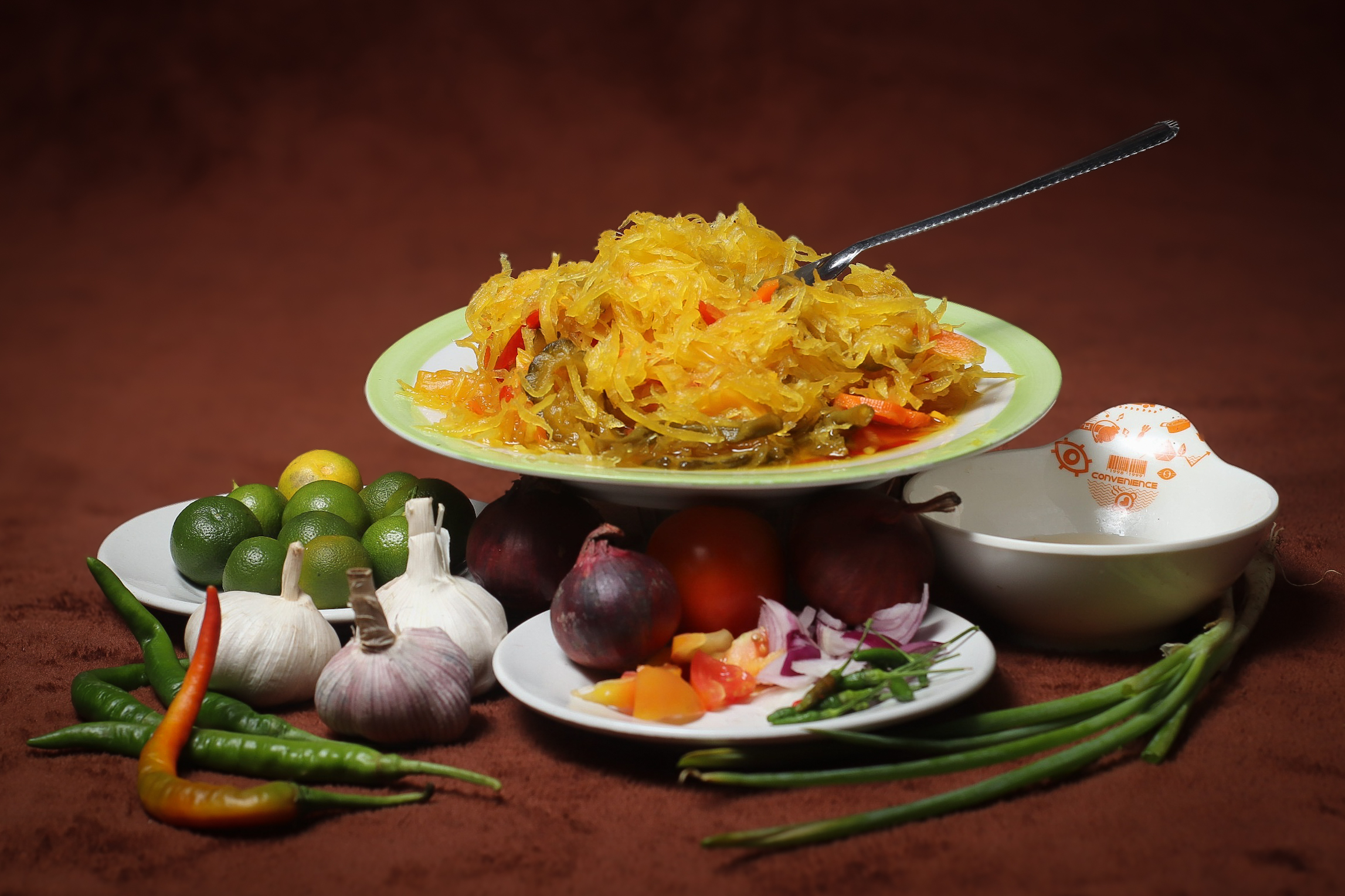
- Papaya atchara
- Alternative names: Atsara, achara
- Place of origin: Philippines
- Serving temperature: Side or main
- Main ingredients: Unripe papaya

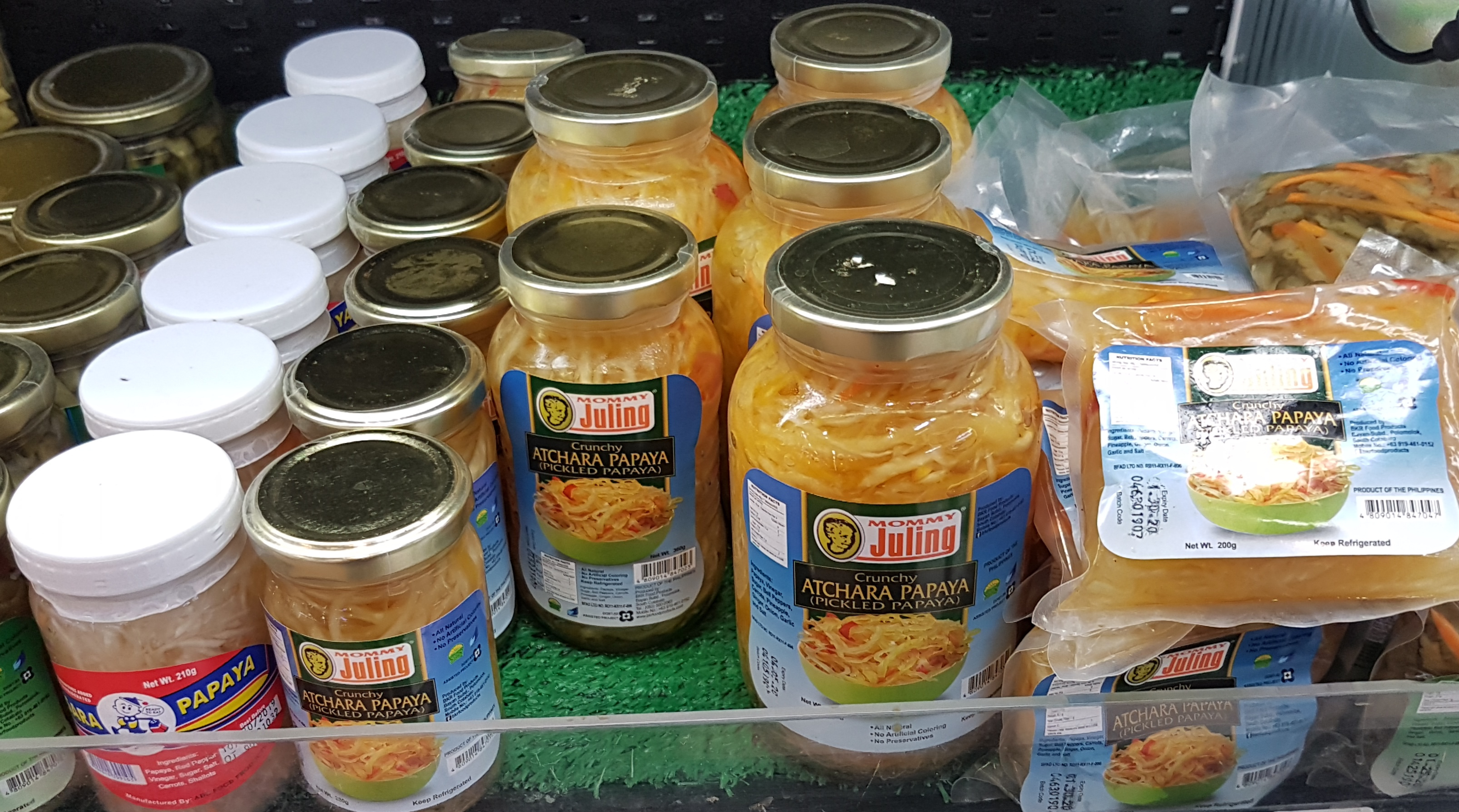
Bottled atchara at a Filipino supermarket

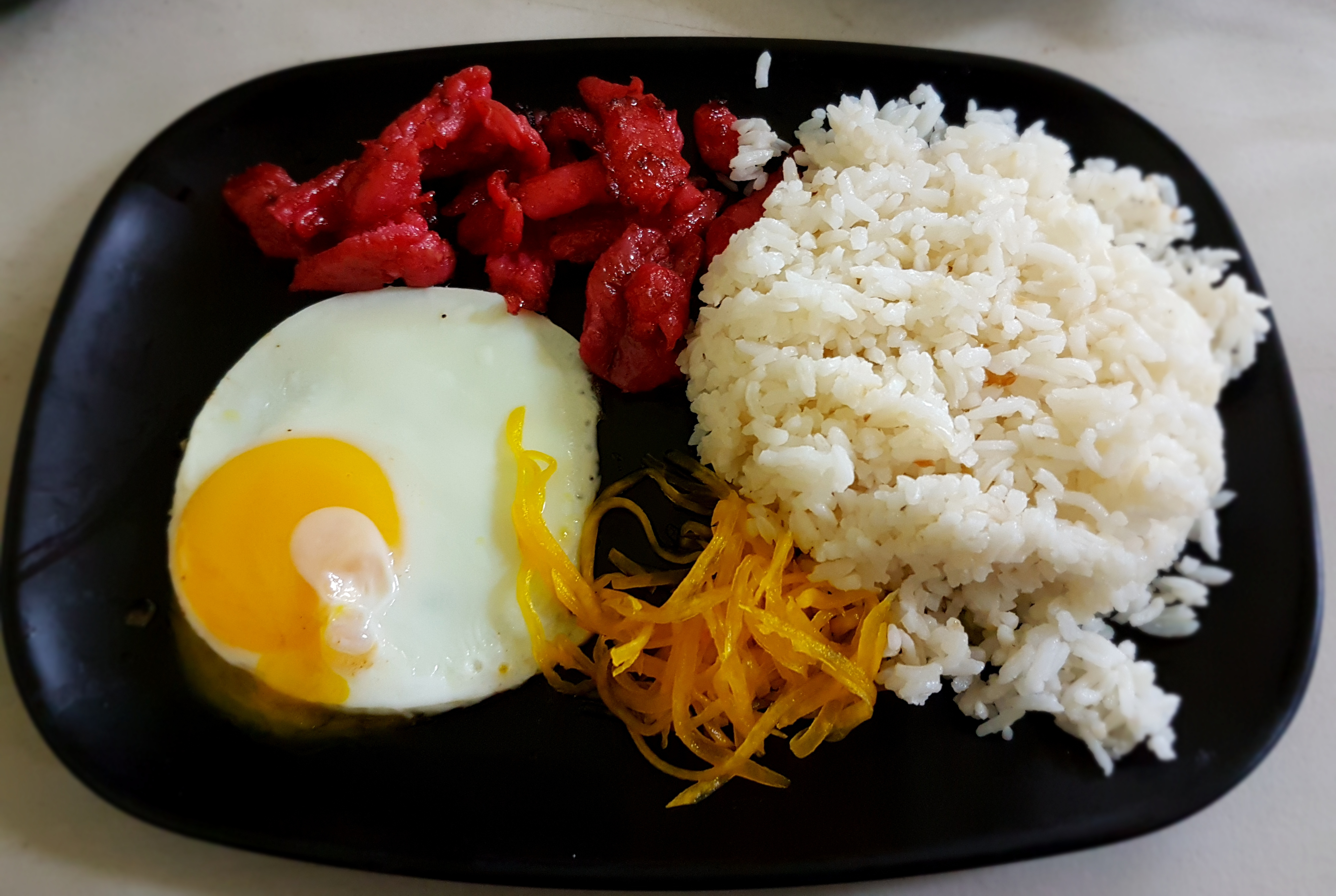
Atchara served as a side dish in the Filipino breakfast tosilog

Atchara (also spelled achara or atsara) is a pickle made from grated unripe papaya originating from the Philippines. This dish is often served as a side dish for fried or grilled foods like pork barbecue.

== History ==
The name atchara originated from the Indian achar, which was transmitted to the Philippines via acar of Indonesia, Malaysia, and Brunei.

== Preparation ==
The primary ingredient is grated unripe papaya. Carrot slices, julienned ginger, bell pepper, onion, and garlic are the other vegetables in the ingredients. Raisins or pineapple chunks may be added and chilis, freshly ground black pepper, red pepper flakes, or whole peppercorns complete the mixture. Then it is mixed in a solution of vinegar, sugar/syrup, and salt preserves.

The mixture is placed in airtight jars where it will keep without refrigeration; however once opened, it is preferably kept chilled to maintain its flavor.

== Variants ==
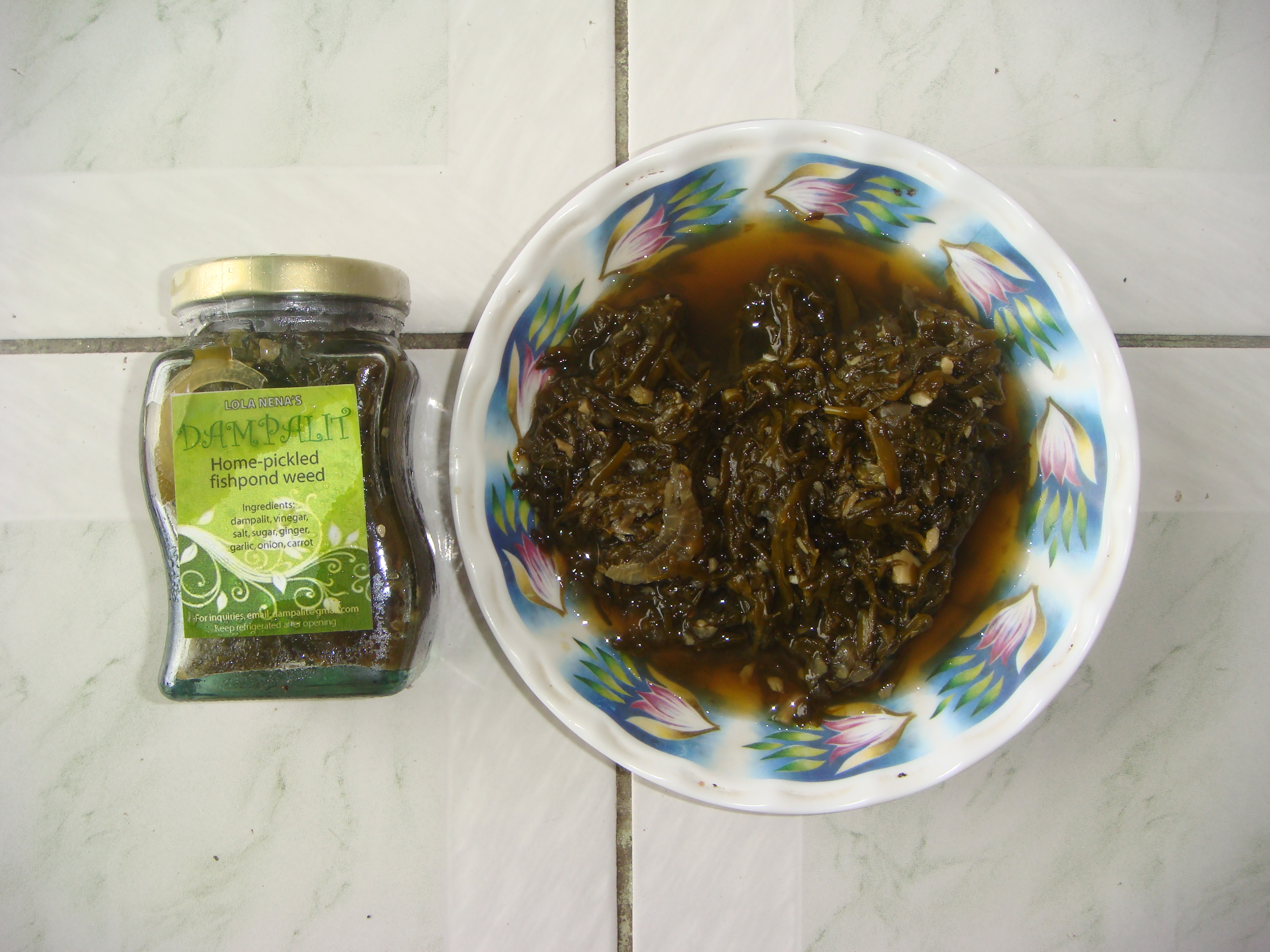
Dampalit, pickled sea purslane (Sesuvium portulacastrum)

- Atcharang maasim (sour pickles) - prepared in the same way as normal atchara except that no sugar is added.
- Atcharang labóng (pickled bamboo shoots) - are prepared in the same way as atchara, but use bamboo shoots instead of papaya.
- Atcharang dampalit (pickled sea purslane) - made from Sesuvium portulacastrum, called dampalit in Tagalog.
- Atcharang ubod (pickled palm hearts) - made from palm hearts, called ubod in Tagalog.
- Atcharang sayote (pickled chayote) - made from chayote, bell pepper, carrots, and ginger.

== See also ==
- Philippine condiments
- Acar – Southeast Asian pickled vegetables
- Curtido — Fermented cabbage relish from Central America
- Green papaya salad – Spicy salad made from unripe papaya
- South Asian pickle — Pickled varieties of vegetables and fruit
- Tsukemono – Japanese preserved vegetables
- List of fermented foods
