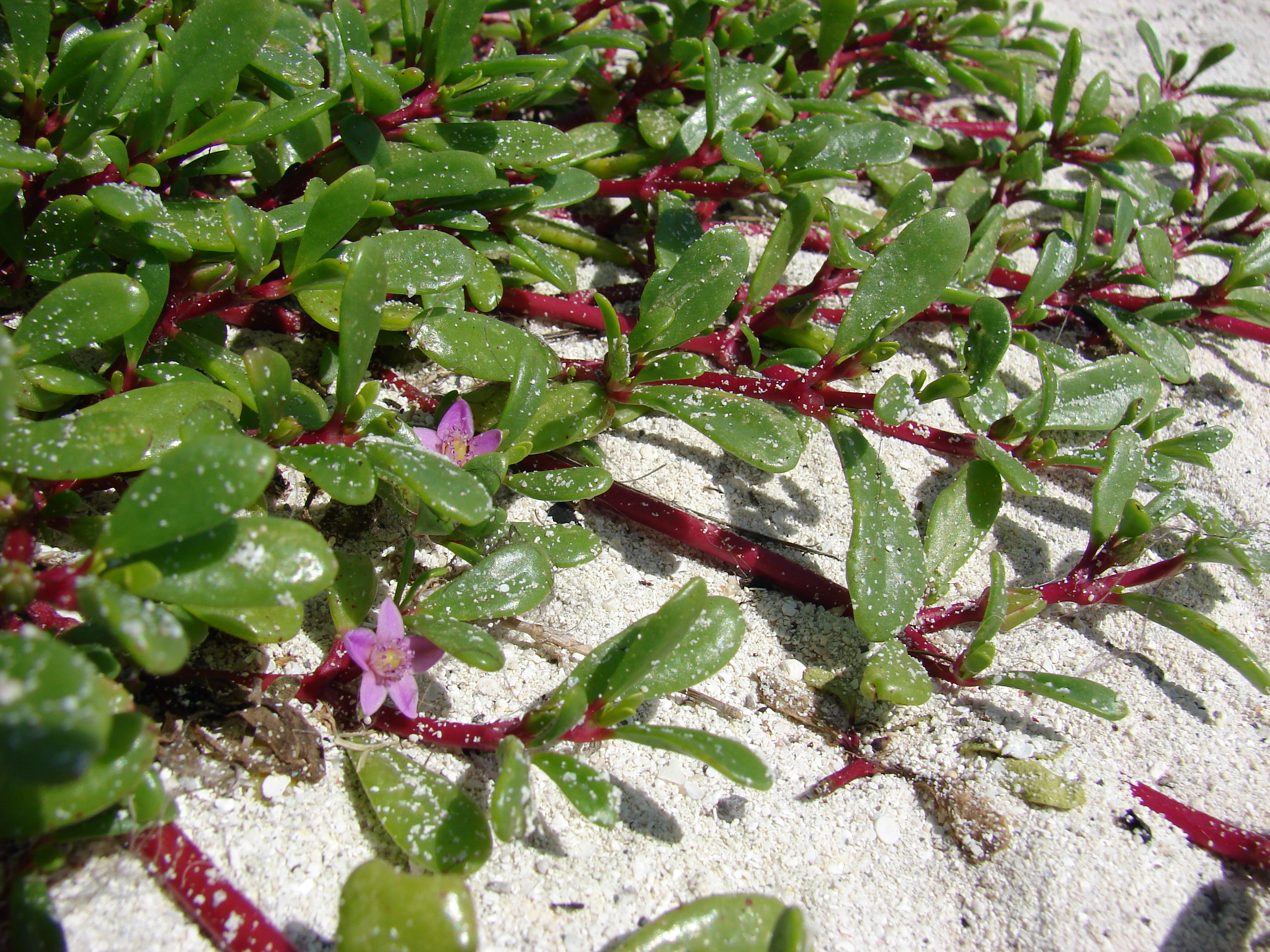

Conservation status
- Least Concern (IUCN 3.1)

Scientific classification
- Kingdom: Plantae
- Clade: Tracheophytes
- Clade: Angiosperms
- Clade: Eudicots
- Order: Caryophyllales
- Family: Aizoaceae
- Genus: Sesuvium
- Species: S. portulacastrum

Binomial name
- Sesuvium portulacastrum (L.) L.

Synonyms
- Synonymy: Portulaca portulacastrum L. 1753; Aizoon canariense Andrews 1802 not L. 1753; Aizoon montevidense Spreng. ex Rohr; Halimus maritima Kuntze; Halimus portulacastrum (L.) Kuntze; Mollugo maritima Ser.; Psammanthe marina Hance; Pyxipoma polyandrum Fenzl; Sesuvium acutifolium Miq.; Sesuvium brevifolium Schumach. & Thonn.; Sesuvium edule Wight ex Wall.; Sesuvium longifolium Humb. & Bonpl. ex Willd.; Sesuvium ortegae Spreng.; Sesuvium parviflorum DC.; Sesuvium pedunculatum Pers.; Sesuvium pentandrum Elliott; Sesuvium repens Willd.; Sesuvium revolutifolium Ortega; Sesuvium revolutum Pers.; Sesuvium sessile Pers.; Sesuvium sessiliflorum Dombey ex Rohrb.; Trianthema americana Gillies ex Arn.; Trianthema polyandra Blume

= Sesuvium portulacastrum =

Species of succulent

Sesuvium portulacastrum is a sprawling perennial herb in the family Aizoaceae that grows in coastal and mangrove areas throughout much of the world. It grows in sandy clay, coastal limestone and sandstone, tidal flats and salt marshes, throughout much of the world. It is native to Africa, Asia, Australia, Hawai`i, North America and South America, and has naturalised in many places where it is not indigenous.

It is commonly known as shoreline purslane or (ambiguously) "sea purslane," in English, dampalit in Tagalog and 海马齿 hǎimǎchǐ in Chinese.

== Description ==
Sesuvium portulacastrum is a vine up to 30 centimetres (12 in) high, with thick, smooth stems up to 1 metre (3.3 ft) long. It has smooth, fleshy, glossy green leaves that are linear or lanceolate, 1–7 centimetres (0.39–2.76 in) long and 1.5–2 centimetres (0.59–0.79 in) wide.

Its flowers bud from the leaf axils. They are small, 0.5 centimetres (0.20 in) in diameter, and pink or purple in colour. They close at nighttime or when the sky is cloudy. They are pollinated by bees and moths.

The fruit is a round capsule, and has tiny black seeds that do not float.

== Taxonomy ==
It was first published as Portulaca portulacastrum by Carl Linnaeus in 1753. Six years later Linnaeus transferred it into Sesuvium, and it has remained at that name ever since, with the exception of an unsuccessful 1891 attempt by Otto Kuntze to transfer the species into a new genus as Halimus portulacastrum.

== Chemistry and medicine ==
Fatty acid composition:- palmitic acid (31.18%), oleic acid (21.15%), linolenic acid (14.18%) linoleic acid (10.63%), myristic acid (6.91%) and behenic acid (2.42%) The plant extract showed antibacterial and anticandidal activities and moderate antifungal activity.

== Human consumption ==
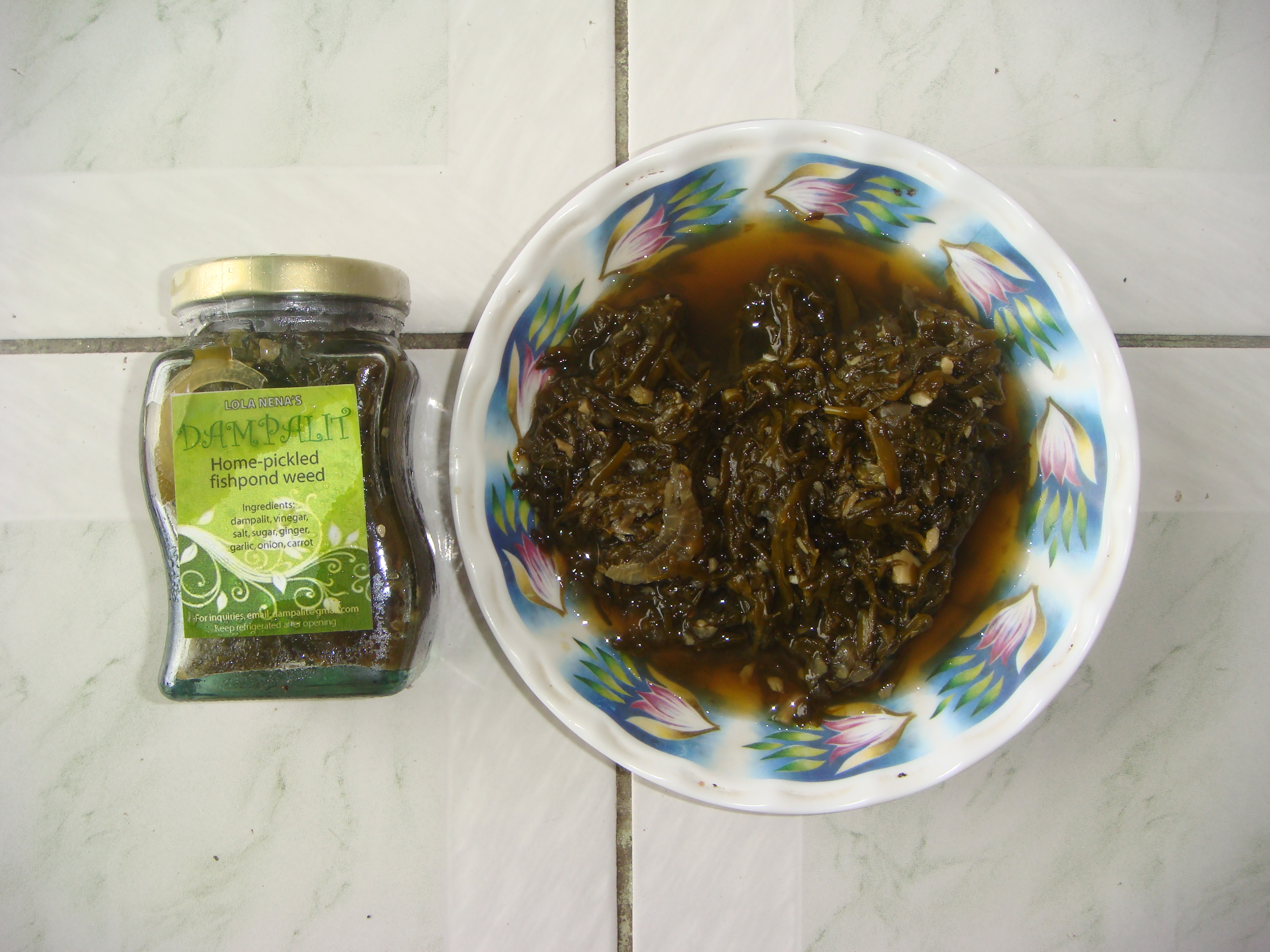
Atsara, a Philippine condiment often featuring dampalit

Sesuvium portulacastrum is eaten in the Philippines, where it is called dampalit in Tagalog and "bilang" or "bilangbilang" in the Visayan language. The plant is primarily pickled and eaten as atchara (sweet traditional pickles).
