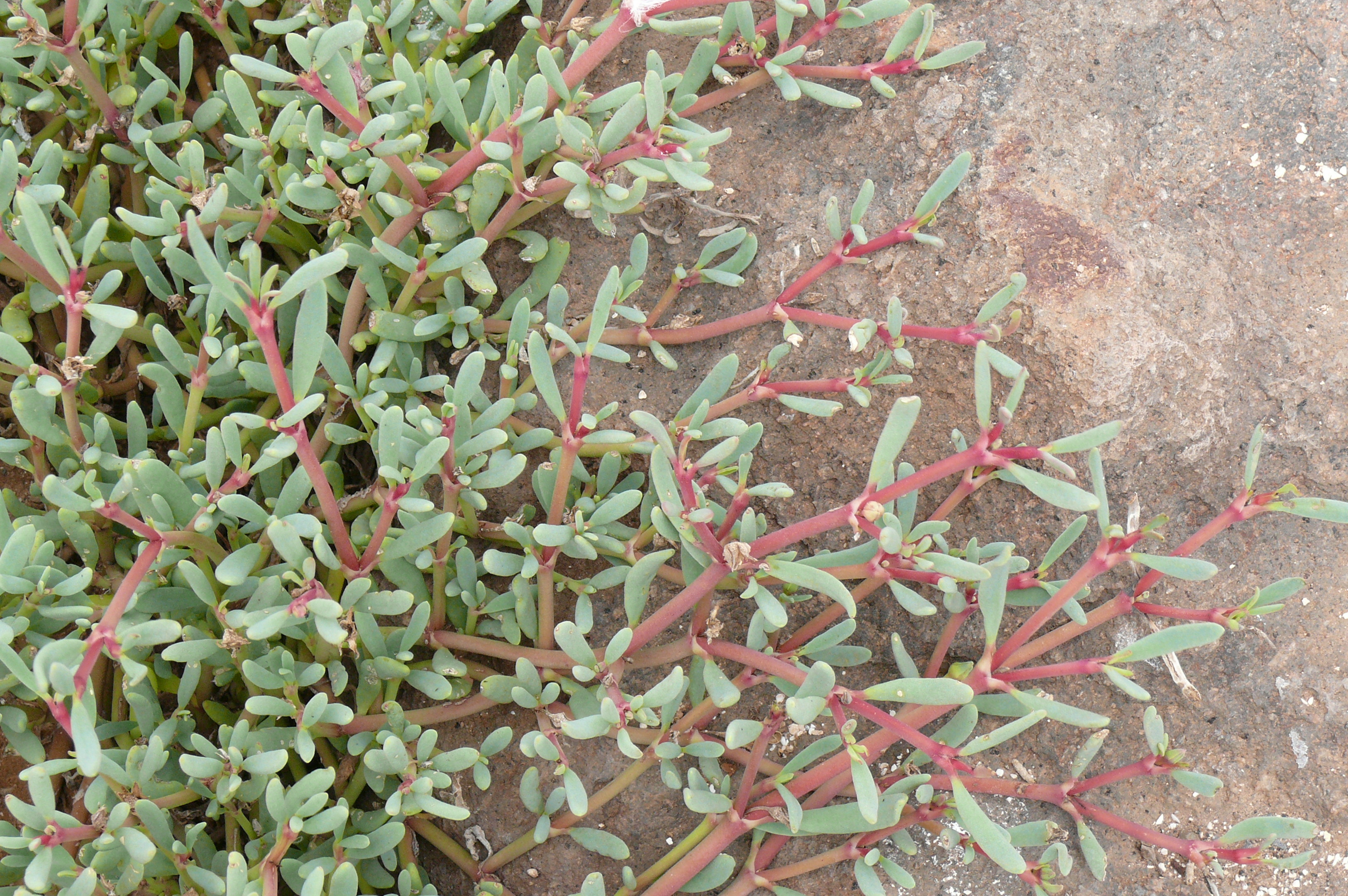
- Galapagos carpet weed (March 2005)

Conservation status
- Least Concern (IUCN 2.3)

Scientific classification
- Kingdom: Plantae
- Clade: Tracheophytes
- Clade: Angiosperms
- Clade: Eudicots
- Order: Caryophyllales
- Family: Aizoaceae
- Genus: Sesuvium
- Species: S. edmonstonei

Binomial name
- Sesuvium edmonstonei Hook.f.

= Sesuvium edmonstonei =

Species of succulent

Sesuvium edmonstonei, commonly known as Galapagos carpet weed, is a species of plant in the family Aizoaceae. It is endemic to the Galápagos Islands (Ecuador).

== Description ==
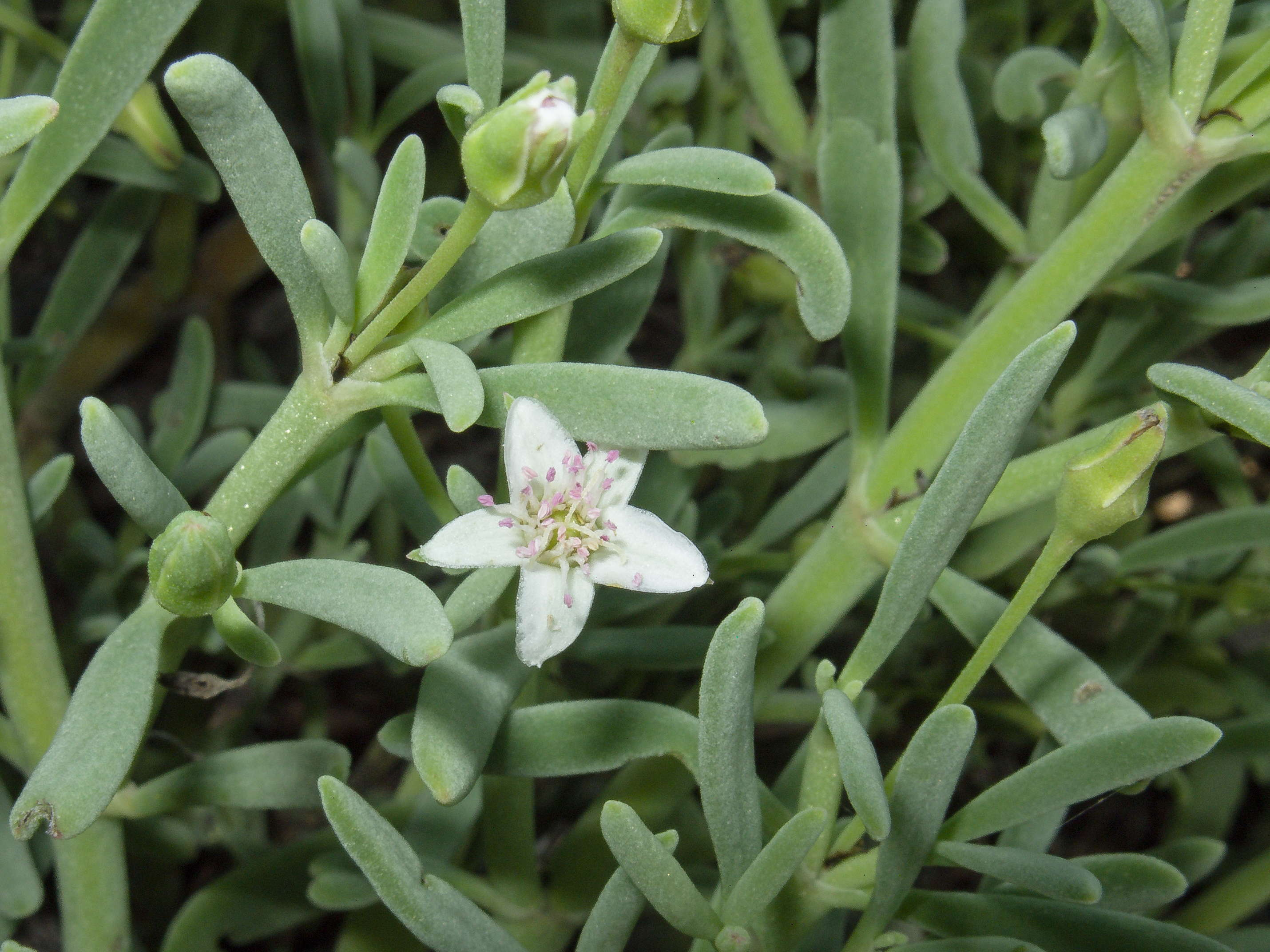
Flowering in May

Sesuvium edmonstonei is a low-growing perennial plant. The stems, which are fleshy and covered with scales, are sometimes woody at the base. The succulent leaves are oblanceolate and grow in opposite pairs; they are simple, entire and up to 3 cm (1.2 in) long. The flowers grow in the leaf axils, each having a five-lobed white calyx, no petals, and many stamens. The fruits that follow are ovoid capsules, with lids, containing black seeds with wrinkled cuticles. The plants develop orange and red hues in the cool season.

== Distribution and habitat ==
This succulent plant is endemic to the Galapagos Islands. It is found on Darwin Island, Española Island, Fernandina Island, Floreana Island, Genovesa Island, Isabela Island, Rábida Island, San Cristóbal Island, Santa Cruz Island, Santiago Island and Wolf Island. It spreads in sheets across both rocky and sandy ground.
