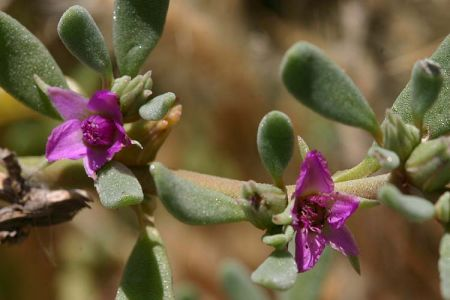

Conservation status
- Secure (NatureServe)

Scientific classification
- Kingdom: Plantae
- Clade: Tracheophytes
- Clade: Angiosperms
- Clade: Eudicots
- Order: Caryophyllales
- Family: Aizoaceae
- Genus: Sesuvium
- Species: S. verrucosum

Binomial name
- Sesuvium verrucosum Raf.

Synonyms
- Sesuvium erectum Correll; Sesuvium sessile Larrañaga

= Sesuvium verrucosum =

Succulent plant species in the fig-marigold family

Sesuvium verrucosum is a species of flowering plant in the family Aizoaceae known by the common names western sea-purslane and verrucose sea-purslane.

It is a perennial herb producing many branching prostrate stems up to 1 metre (3 1/2 feet) long, forming a mat up to 2 m (6 1/2 ft) tall and wide. The gray-green herbage is verrucose, covered densely in crystalline bumps. The stems are lined with leaves of varying shapes which measure up to 4 centimetres (1 1/2 inches) long. The flowers, about 1 cm (3/8 in) across, occur in the leaf axils. They have no petals, but the five, pointed sepals are generally bright pink to reddish or orange in color with a thick, verrucose outer surface. At the centre of the flower is a ring of stamens around the central ovary. The fruit is a capsule about 50 cm (20 in) long, containing many seeds.

It is native to the Americas, where it can be found in the southwestern United States plus Kansas and Missouri, Mexico, and parts of South America. It grows in many types of saline and alkaline habitat types on the coast and inland, including salt marshes and other saline wetlands, alkali flats, and drying desert washes.
