= Acar =

Southeast Asian pickled vegetables

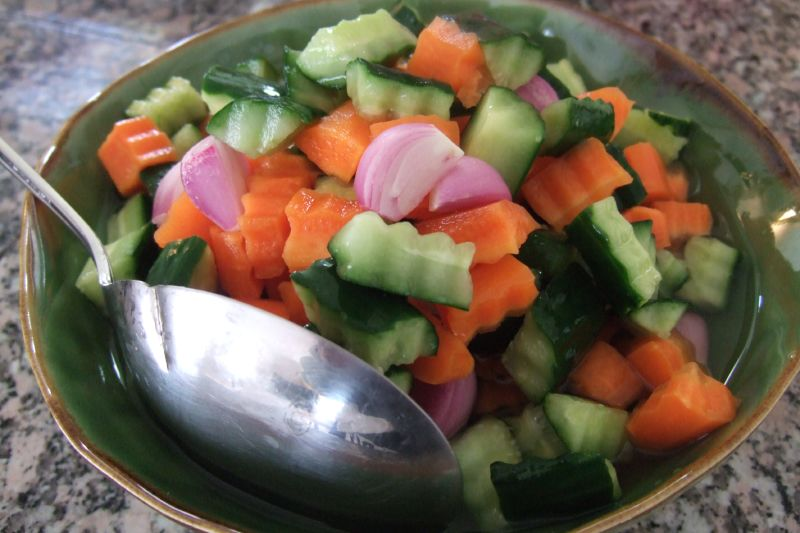
- Acar made of cucumber, carrot and shallot bits in vinegar
- Alternative names: Atjar (Dutch)
- Type: Condiment and salad
- Course: Side dish
- Associated cuisine: Indonesia, Brunei, Malaysia, the Netherlands, Singapore, South Africa and Thailand
- Main ingredients: Vegetables (cucumber, carrots, cabbage), shallot, bird's eye chili and yardlong beans, vinegar, dried chillies, pineapples

Acar (Malay pronunciation: [ˈat͡ʃar], also spelled in Dutch as atjar) is a type of vegetable pickle of Maritime Southeast Asia, most prevalent in Indonesia, Malaysia, Singapore and Brunei aas well as spread into Dutch cuisine. It is a localised version of Indian achar. Acar is usually prepared in bulk as it may easily be stored in a well-sealed glass jar in refrigerator for a week, and served as a condiment for any meals.

== History ==
Pickling originated in India around 2400 BCE, and with expansion of Indian cultural influence on Greater India, through transmission of Hinduism leading to Indianisation, and the formation of native Southeast Asian kingdoms which adopted many Indian cultural elements, including food processing techniques.

Through examining the etymology, the similar sounding name strongly suggests that indeed acar was derived from the Indian achar pickle. Indian achar was transmitted in antiquity to the maritime realm of Southeast Asia, covering modern-day Indonesia, Malaysia, Singapore and Brunei, and then on to the Philippines as atchara. The adoption of this vegetable pickling technique possibly took place during the Srivijaya period between 7th to 13th century. The product's name however is a different matter as acar is not found in classical Malay literature between 13th to 16th centuries despite its Indo-Persian origins let alone early Western dictionaries like of Frederick de Houtman's in 1603; linguist Waruno Mahdi proposes the name may have come through Goa's Luso-Indians.

British navigator Thomas Forrest wrote that acar made of salted limes and palm vinegar was often of use to Coromandel Muslim sailors (Chulias) to prevent scurvy and was sold as far as Aceh.

== Ingredients ==
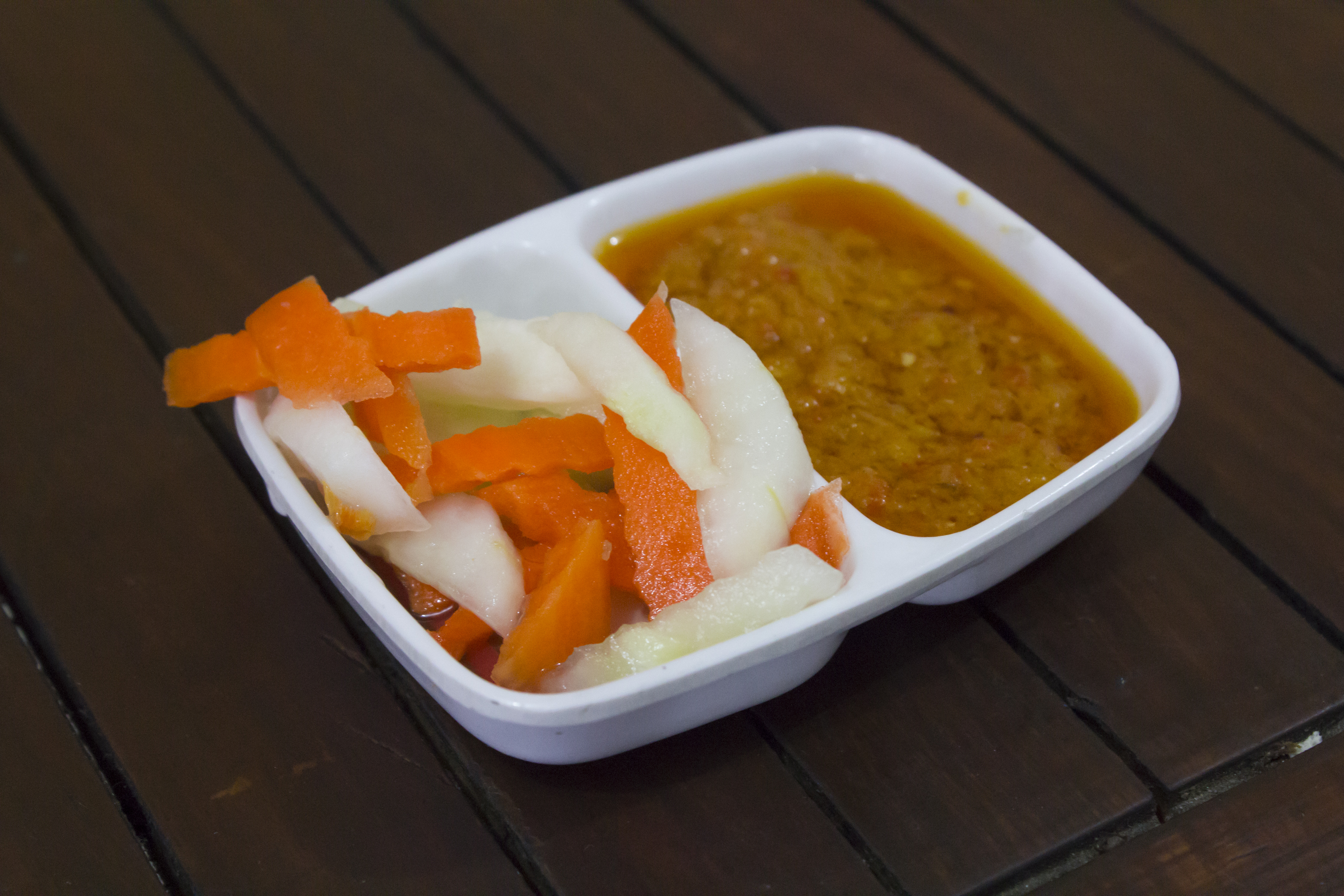
Acar (left) served with sambal, the common condiments in Indonesia.

The Southeast Asian variations are usually made from different vegetables such as cucumber, carrots, cabbage, shallot, bird's eye chili and yardlong beans, which are pickled in vinegar, sometimes with kaffir lime to add citrus aroma, and also dried chillies. Some recipes might have the vegetables tossed in ground peanuts. Acar is commonly served as a condiment to be eaten with a main course, such as martabak, nasi goreng (fried rice), satay, and almost all varieties of soto. Just like common pickles, the sour taste of acar is meant to freshen up a meal, especially fishy dishes such as ikan bakar (grilled fish) or rich and oily dishes such as mutton satay to neutralize the fat.

== Regional cuisines ==
In Indonesia, acar is commonly made from small chunks of cucumber, carrot, shallot, bird's eye chili and occasionally pineapple, and marinated in a sweet and sour solution of sugar and vinegar. Some households add lemongrass or ginger to spice it up. It is usually used as condiment to accompany grilled foods such as satay. Nevertheless, acar can also be consumed as a whole, complete dish. For example, ikan acar kuning is a fish dish (gourami, mackerel or tilapia) served in acar pickles of cucumber, carrot, shallot and red chili, mixed with yellow spice paste made of ground turmeric, candlenut, ginger, garlic and shallot. It is known as atjar (pickle) in Dutch cuisine, derived from Indonesian acar, since the Netherlands and Indonesia share colonial ties.

Variations of Malaysian and Singaporean acar include acar awak or Nyonya acar and Malay acar. Acar awak is more elaborate, containing additional vegetables such as eggplants as well as aromatic spices in the pickling mix.

The salad has also been adopted into Thai cuisine, where it is called achat (Thai: อาจาด, pronounced [ʔāː.t͡ɕàːt]). It is made with cucumber, red chilies, red onions or shallots, vinegar, sugar and salt. It is served as a side dish with the Thai version of satay (Thai: สะเต๊ะ).

With Indian and Malay slaves initially brought by the British Empire, atchar became a favourite condiment in South Africa. The local variation is usually made with green mangoes.

== See also ==
- Atchara – Filpino unripe papaya pickle (Philippine cuisine)
- Achar – Pickled varieties of vegetable and fruit
- Thai salads – Thai cuisine
- List of salads
