= Shimoni =

Village in Kwale, Kenya

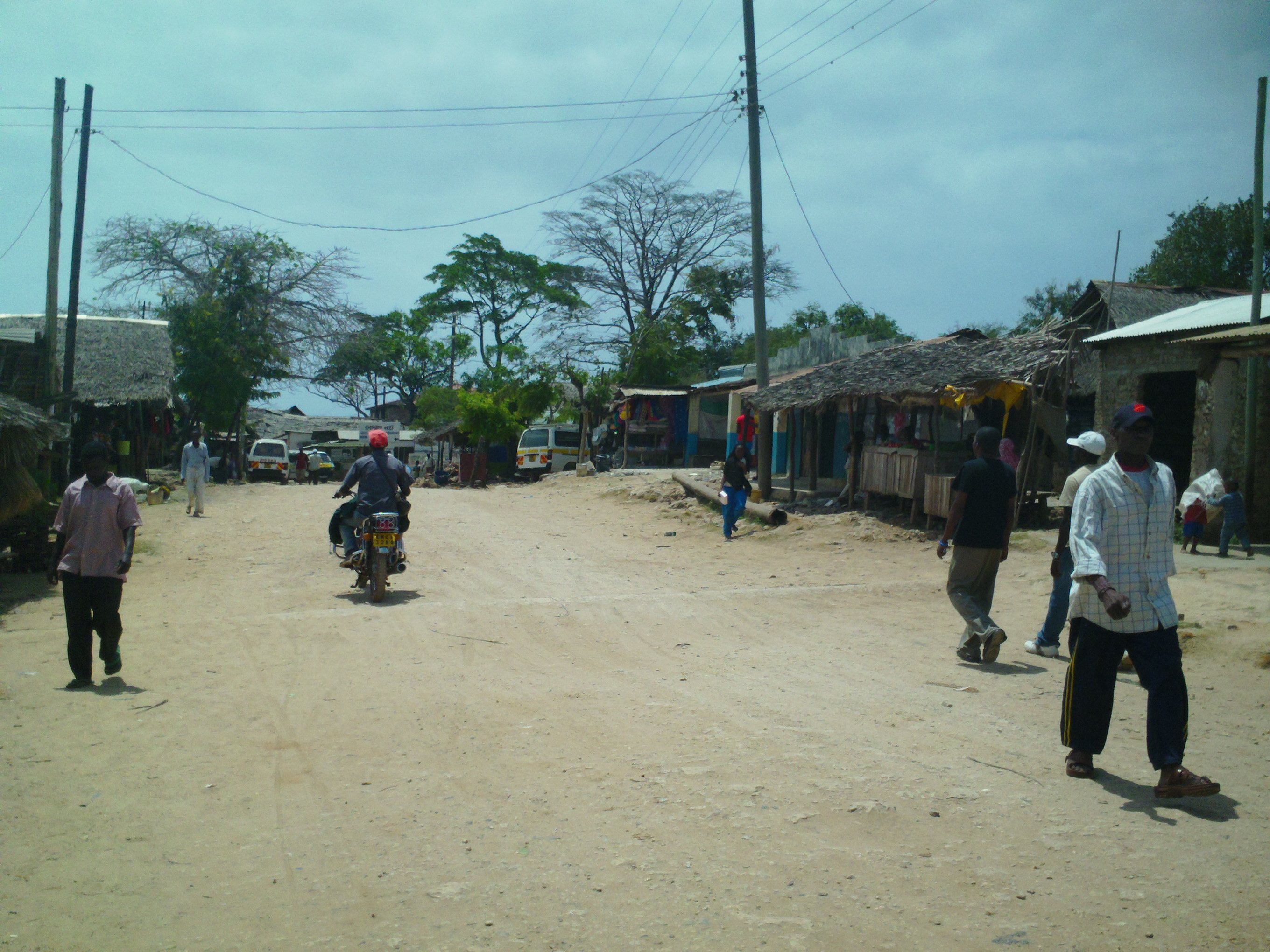
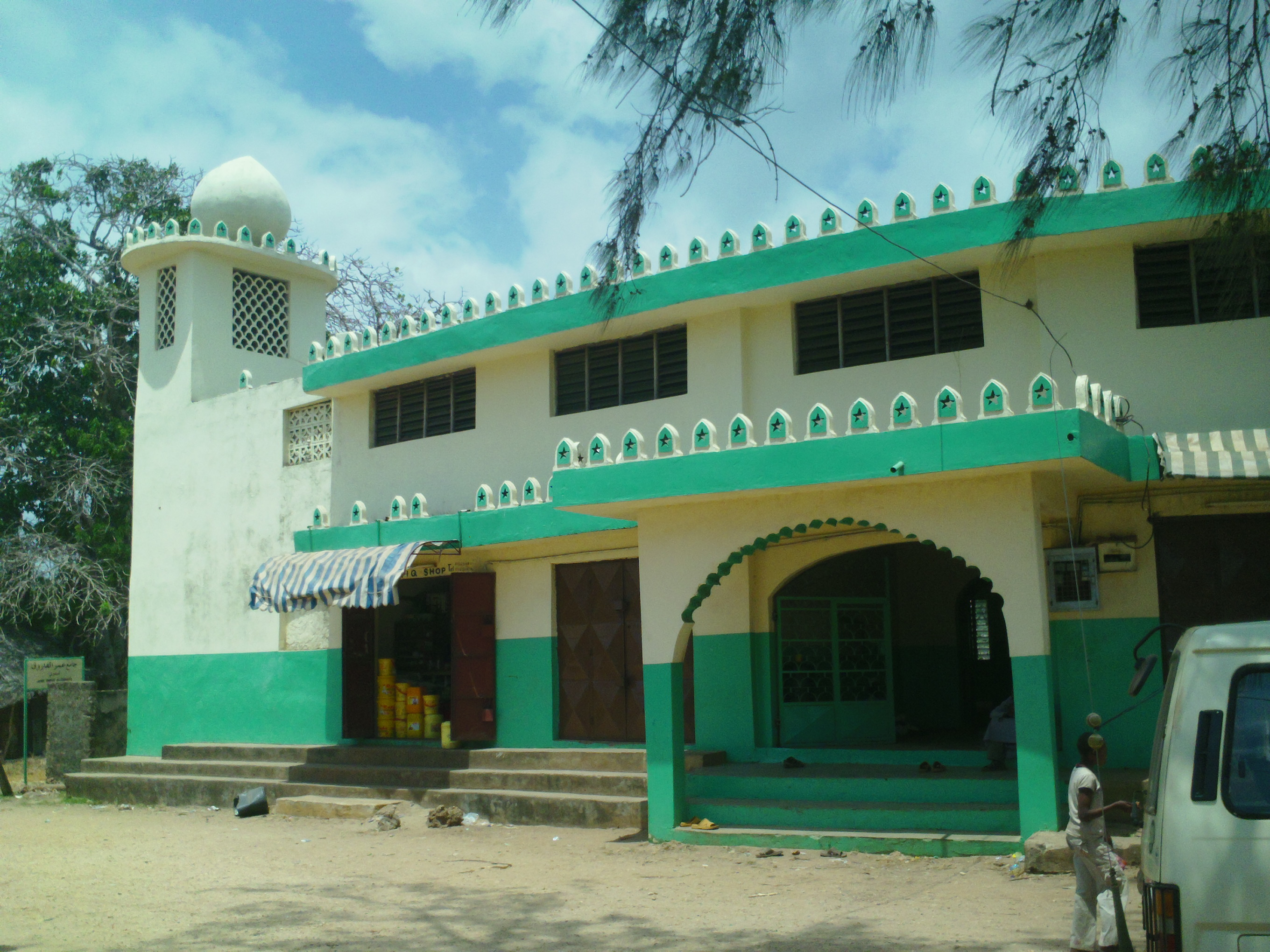
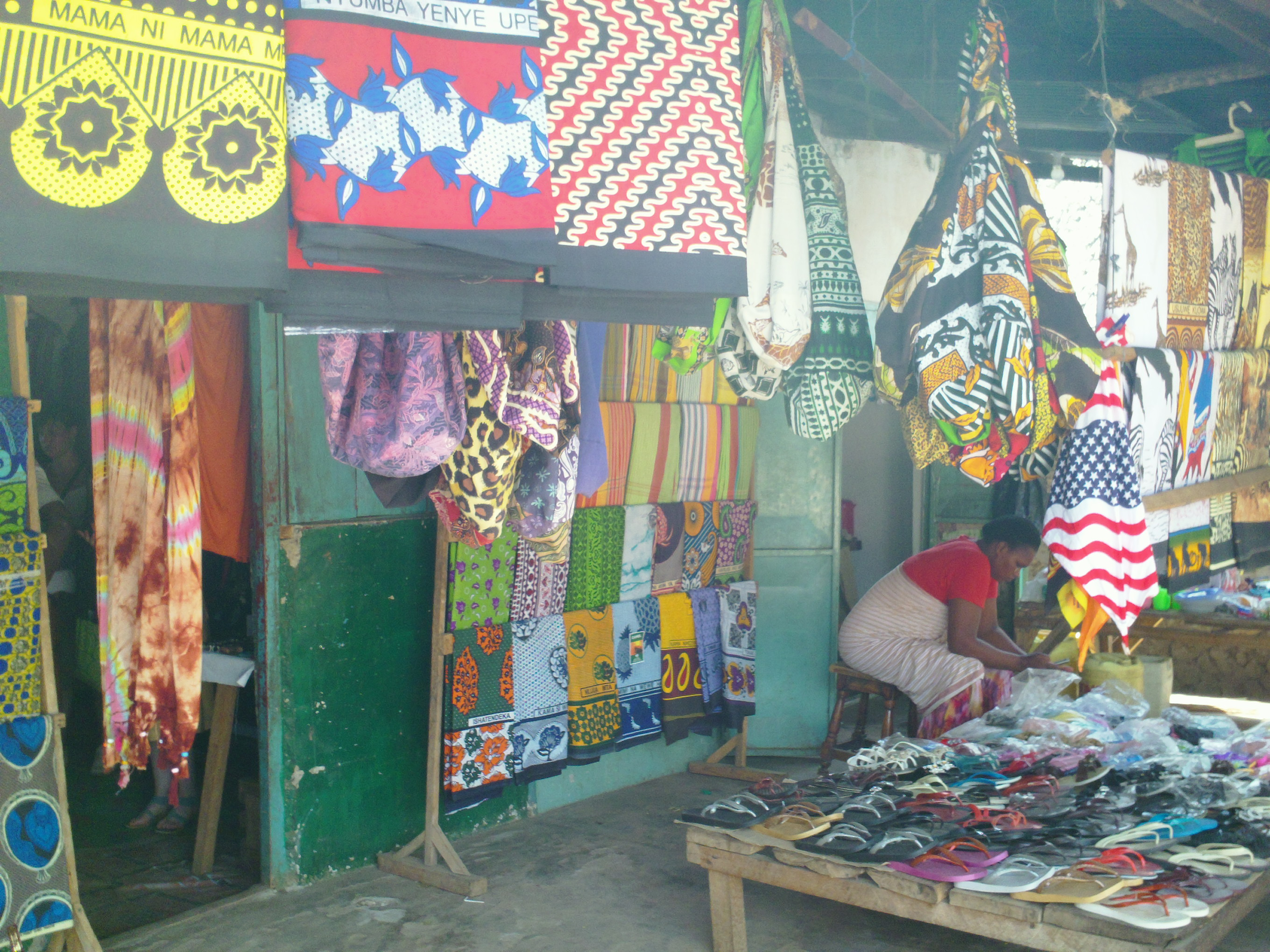
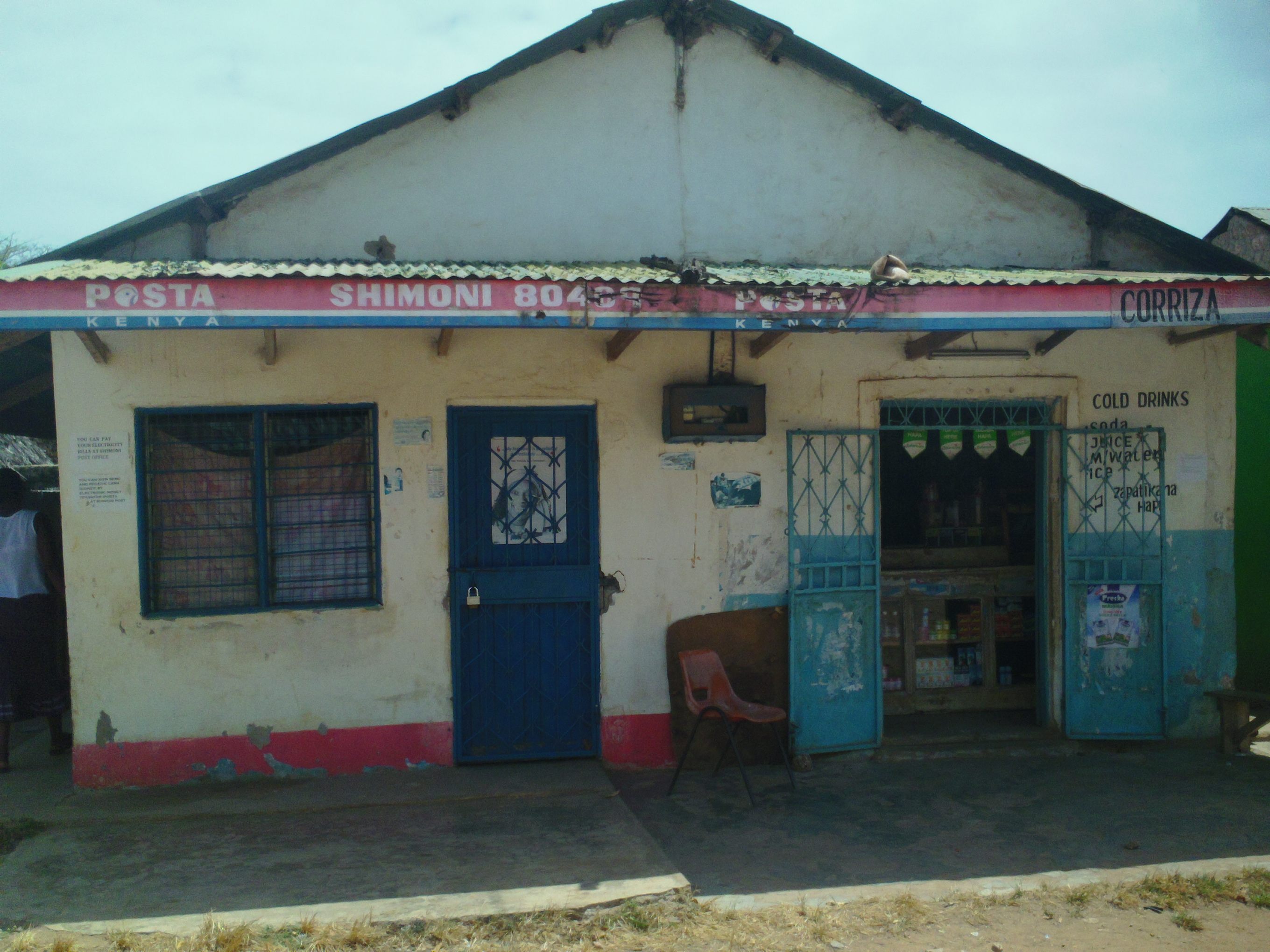
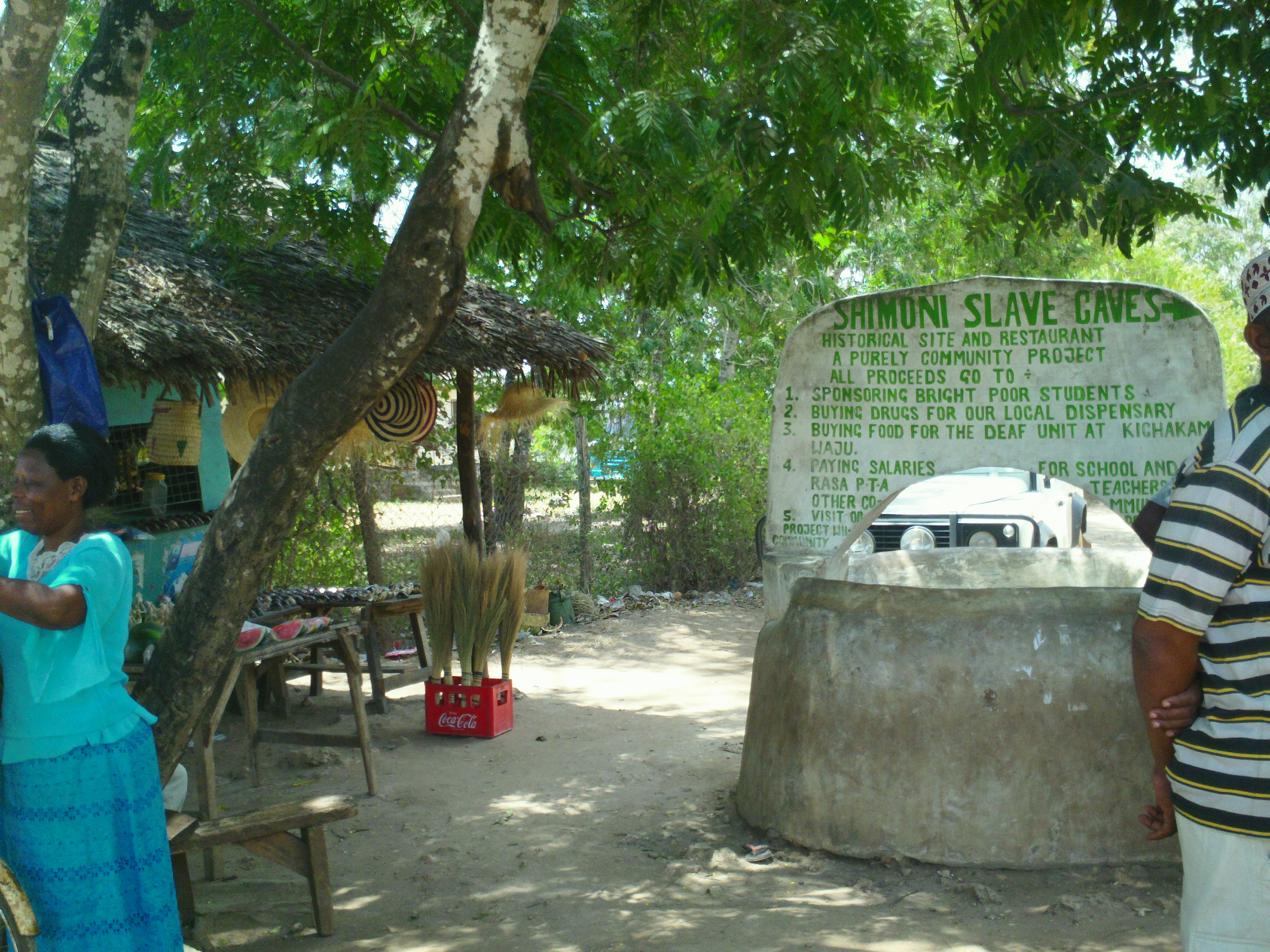
- Clockwise from top-left: Downtown Shimoni; A downtown shop; A sign for the Shimoni Slave Cave; Shimoni's Post Office; A mosque;

- Location within Kenya
- Coordinates: 04°48′38″S 39°22′59″E
- Country: Kenya
- County: Kwale

Shimoni is a port village and tourist destination in Lunga Lunga Constituency, Kwale County. It is in southeastern Kenya near the border with Tanzania and directly across from Wasini Island.

== General information ==
This small town is known for its British colonial ruins and slave caves which are the focus of attraction for several community-based projects. In addition, the Shimoni forest, coast, and marine ecosystems are an ever-present attraction. Therefore, it is no surprise that Kenya Wildlife Service's headquarters for the Kisite-Mpunguti Marine Protected Area is located in Shimoni.

In certain seasons, the aromatic smell of cloves permeates the evening calls to prayer in the town's two main mosques. Still, Shimoni is a relatively religiously diverse area, with a substantial minority of Christians. Additionally, the villagers are aware of the benefits behind the tourism industry and thus are often very gracious and welcoming to tourists. Many villagers own and operate businesses that cater to tourists. However, the majority of the population still relies heavily upon traditional fishing, subsistence farming, and exploiting forest resources.

== History ==
Starting in the 1750s, Shimoni, along with Malindi, Mombasa and other coastal cities and towns, was a primary, 'slave holding port,' for east Africa's coastal slave trade which reached from South Africa to the Middle East. These slave holding pens were located in the natural cave systems that exist in Shimoni. Currently, visitors are granted access to the Shimoni Slave Caves during the guided tour by members of the Shimoni Slave Cave Committee.

In 1857, the British parliament enacted an international ban on the slave trade. In the 1870s, British parliament was successful in convincing Barghash ibn Sa'id, the Sultan of Zanzibar, to acknowledge the ban. This edict choked the trafficking of slaves to and from Zanzibar, effectively cutting off Shimoni's relevance in the slave trade.

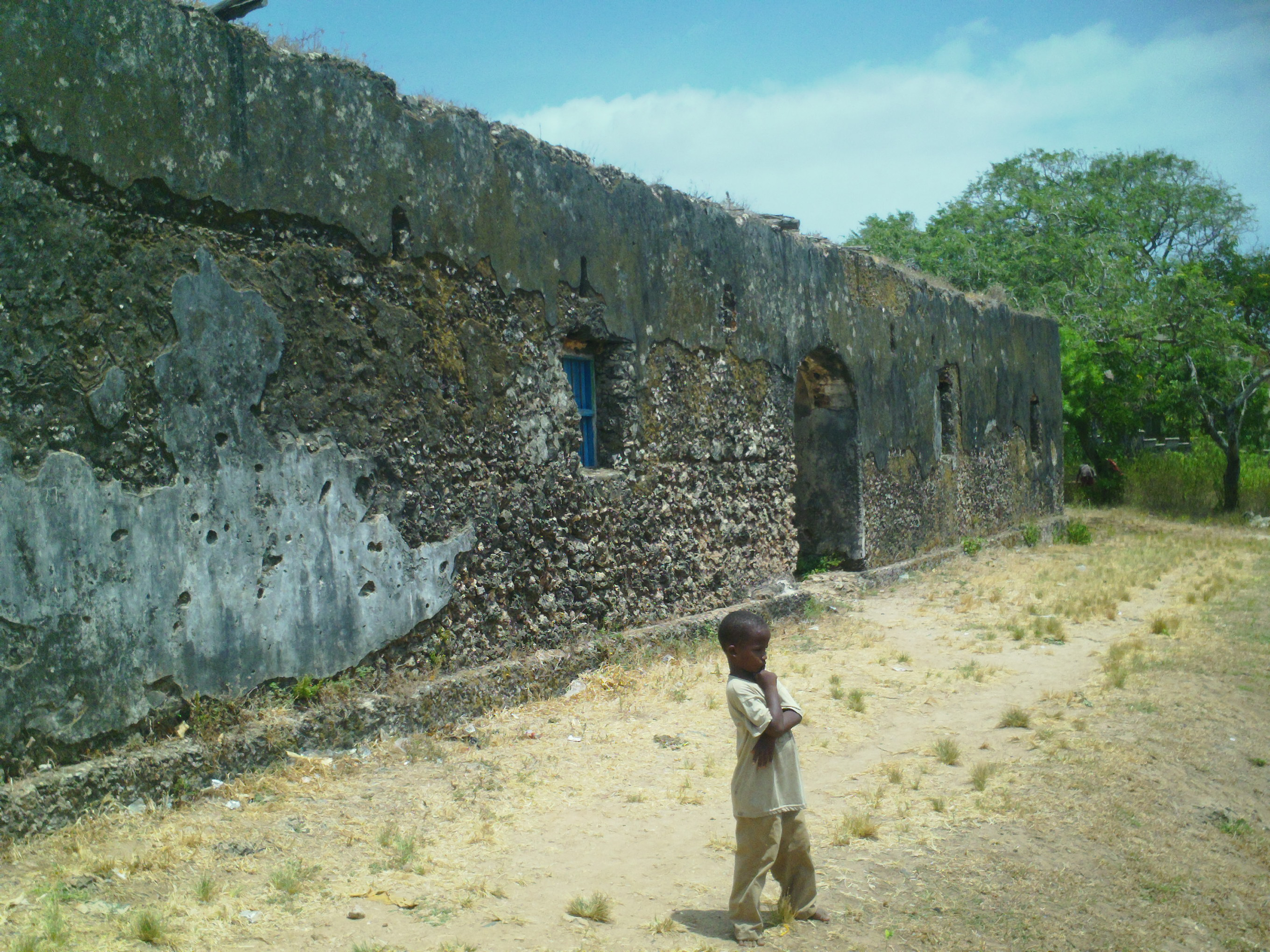
Kenya's first colonial prison. The east wall ruins. The building has since been turned into a makeshift shop for locals to enjoy chai and listen to music

In the 1880s, British colonialism began in Shimoni with the arrival of the British Imperial East Africa Company's headquarters. The British Imperial East Africa Company choose Shimoni because it was virtually uninhabited at the time. Many other buildings in Shimoni were built by the very first British colonists of Kenya, including Kenya's first colonial prison (now in ruins).

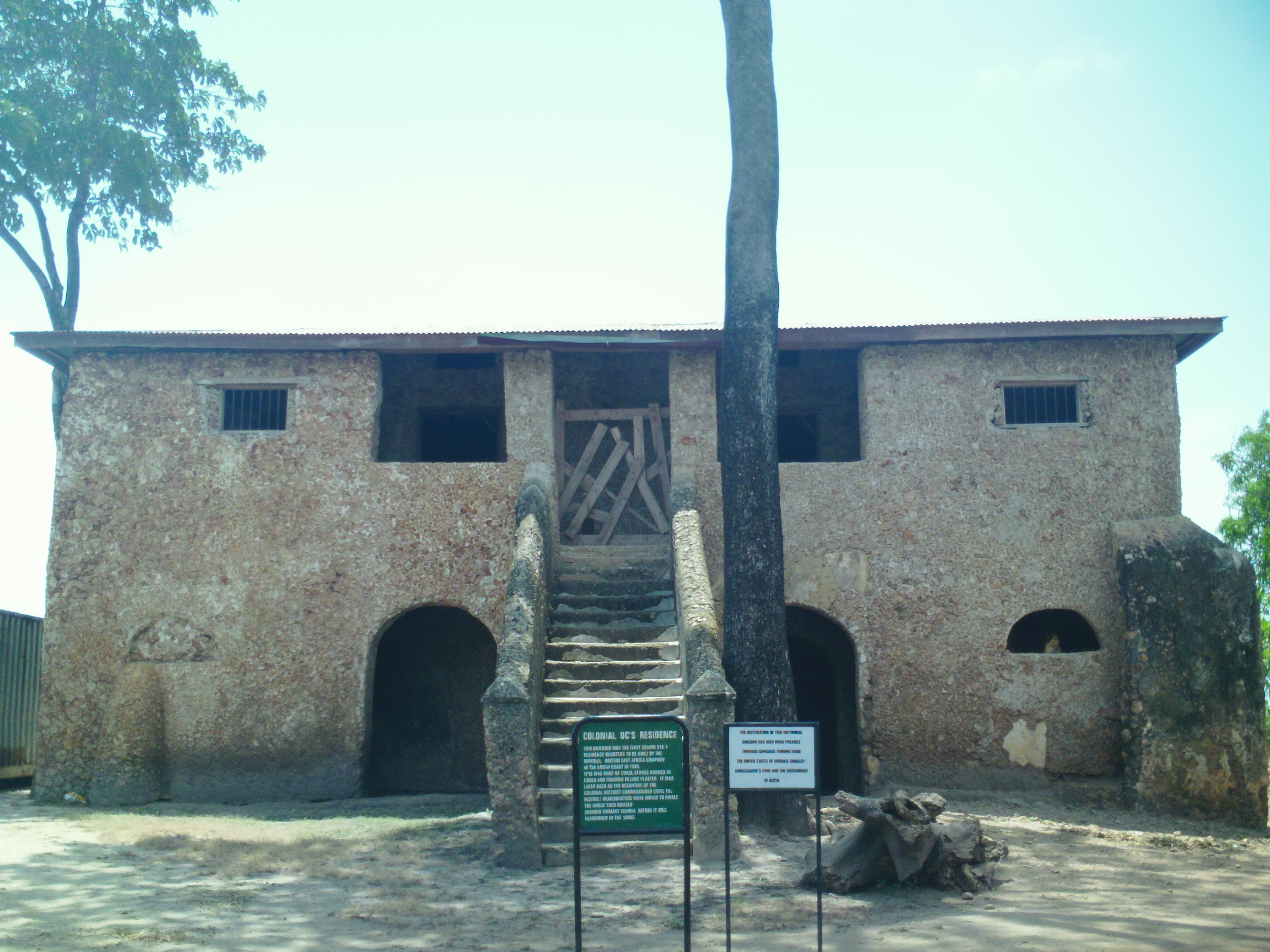
The first senior staff residence headquarters to be built by the Imperial British East Africa Company in the south coast in 1885

Over time it has developed from a sleepy fishing village to become the main port of clearance for oceangoing trade Dhows arriving from as far away as the Arab states of the Persian Gulf, the island of Zanzibar and Dar es Salaam.

== Conservation ==
Kenya Wildlife Service (KWS), in cooperation with privately owned tour dhow operators, try to work together on maintaining and caring for the dolphins that are sighted often within the Wasini Channel, the park, and reserve.

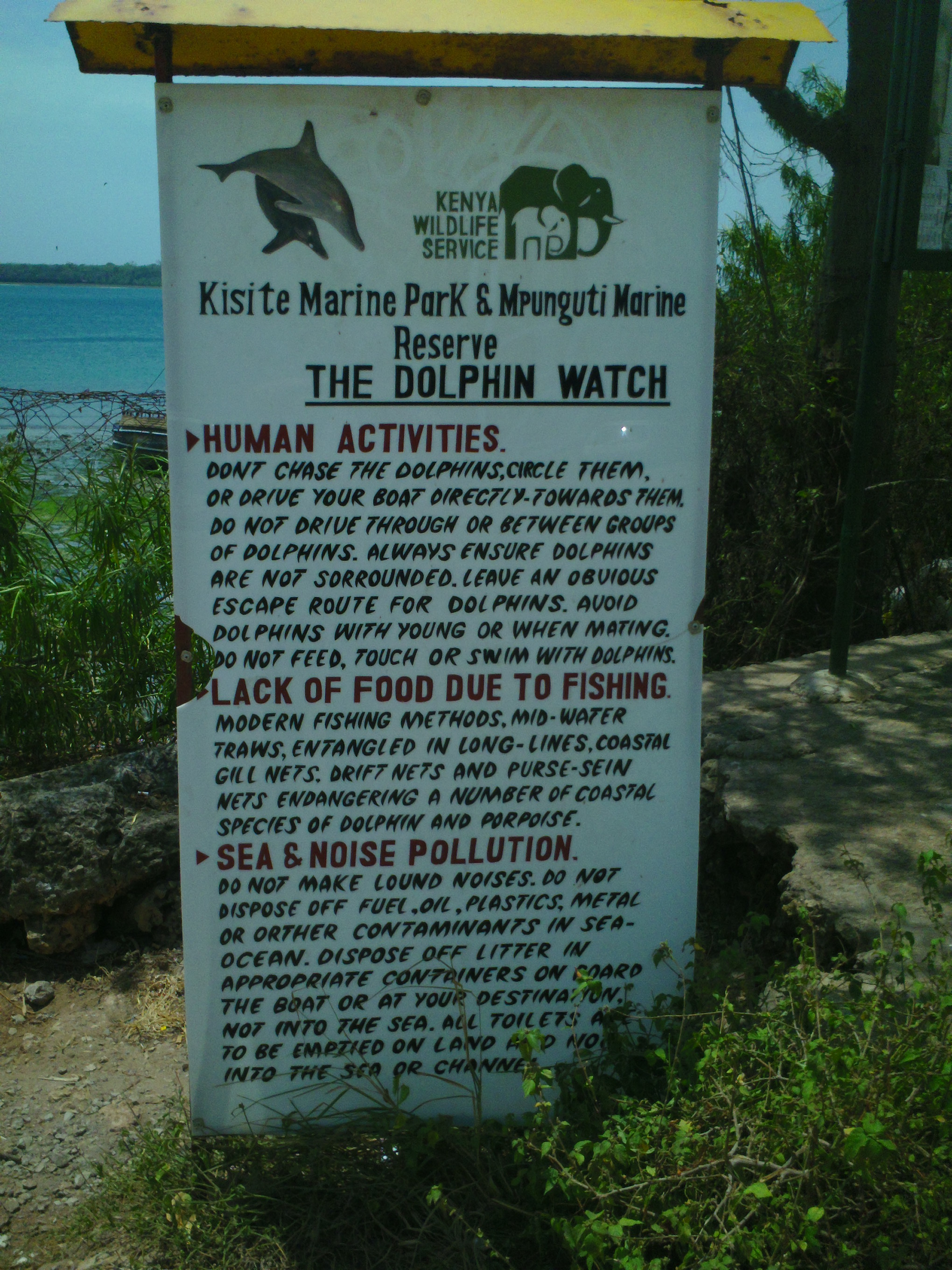
Sign at the Shimoni jetty indicating the standards and protocols in order to prevent harm or disruption to the natural processes and behavior of local marine wildlife.

Apart from the Kenya Wildlife Service, there are several community-based organizations in Shimoni that make an effort to raise awareness about maintaining and fostering the health of the coral reef, forest & marine wildlife.

The Shimoni forest is a coastal forest which features jagged, jumbled fossilized coral substrate that is naturally found in the soil. Often referred to as 'coral rag.' It is often mined for building construction projects in and around the village.

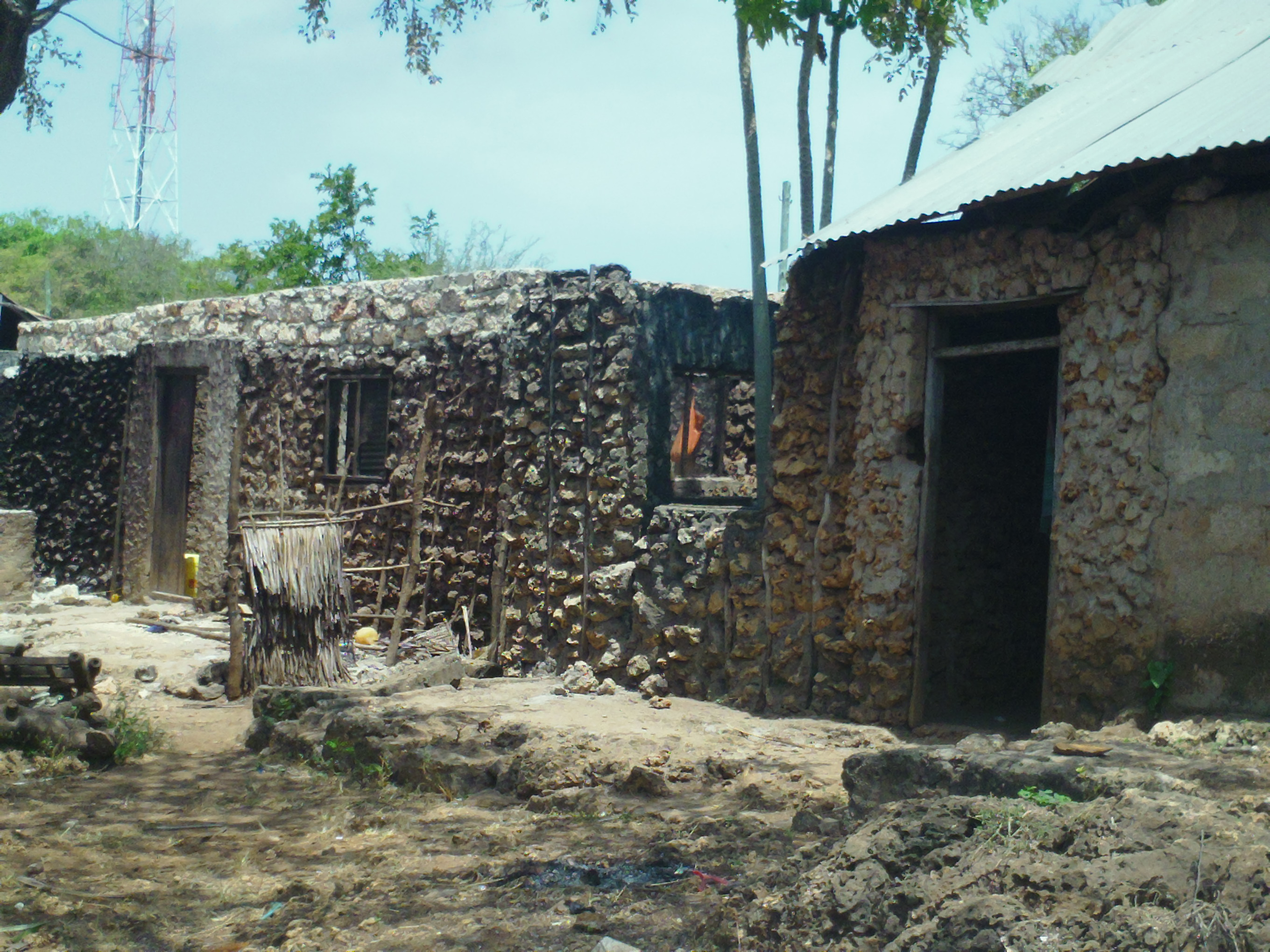
Most homes in Shimoni are built with mined coral from around the area

Over the past ten years, 70% of the Shimoni forest has been depleted through human activity exploiting its resources. As a result, Friends of Shimoni Forest (FSF) is a conservation organization that works to save the Shimoni Forest from deforestation and land encroachment. FSF raises funds through leading Eco-Trail tours and their gift shop.

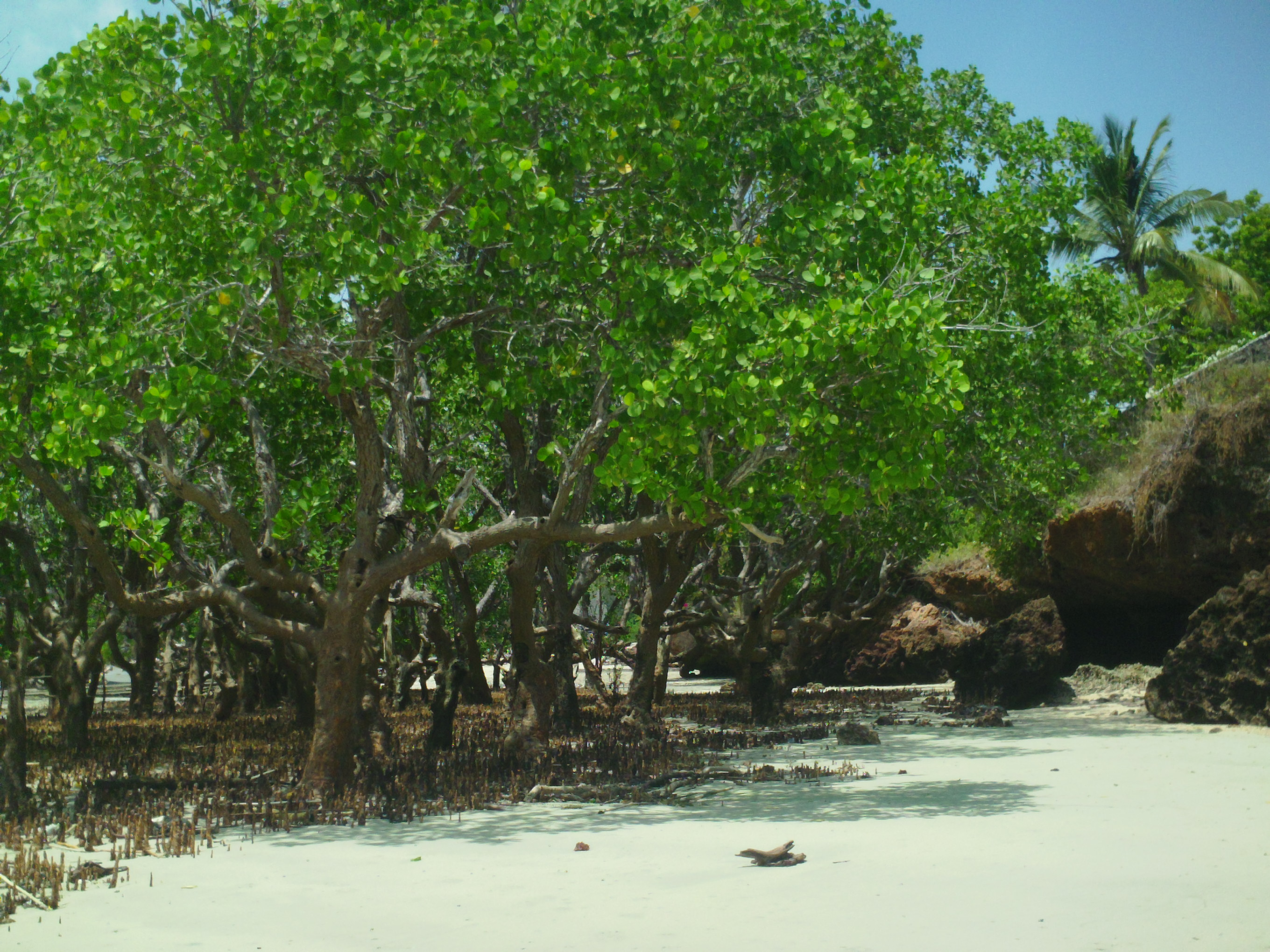
Mangrove trees cover the shores along Shimoni and nearby coastal towns

SEA is also a conservation organization that focuses upon improving the ways in which the community utilizes materials. Currently, SEA has been developing eco-friendly alternatives to charcoal. Charcoal pits are quite common to see in the Shimoni forest; villagers and outside laborers travel to the interior of the forest in order to cut down trees for charcoal. This behavior is an ever-present threat to the forest. In an effort to reduce deforestation, SEA works to create alternative charcoal. Using materials such as coconut shells and paper, SEA creates eco-friendly equivalents to charcoal.

Mangrove trees play a large role in maintaining and preserving Shimoni coastal habitats.

== Tourism ==
The Shimoni Slave Cave tours are one of the primary attractions for Shimoni. It is a historical site and restaurant. As it is a community project, all proceeds go to several other community initiatives: "1) Sponsoring bright poor students. 2) Buying drugs for our local dispensary. 3) Buying food for the deaf unit at Kichakamkwaju. 4) Paying salaries for school and madrasa PTA teachers and other community needs."

Shimoni's tourist attractions include scuba diving centers such as Pilli Pippa and Paradise Divers (located in Mkwiro) which take divers within and outside protected marine areas at Kisite-Mpunguti Marine National Park.

Wasini Island lies 2 km South of Shimoni with Wasini channel separating Wasini from the mainland. Wasini Island's two major villages are Mkwiro and Wasini.

Located on well-stocked fishing grounds, the adjacent Pemba Channel has a reputation for sports angling.

== Economics ==
In July 2025 Betsy Njagi and the Cabinet Secretary for Blue Economy and Maritime Affairs, Hassan Joho, opened a new fish hatchery at Shimoni. Invited dignitaries included Fatuma Masito and the Governor Fatuma Achani.
