= Wasini Island =

Island in Kenya

Coordinates: 4°40′S 39°23′E

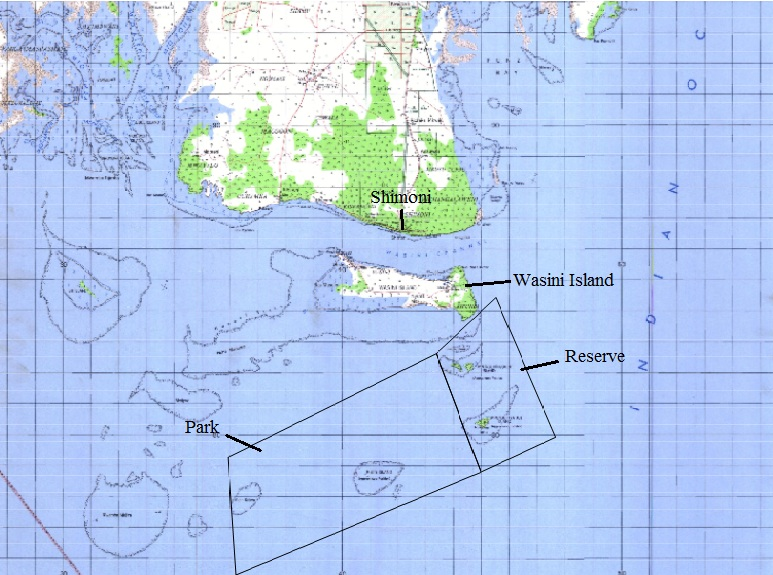
Wasini Island is south of the village of Shimoni

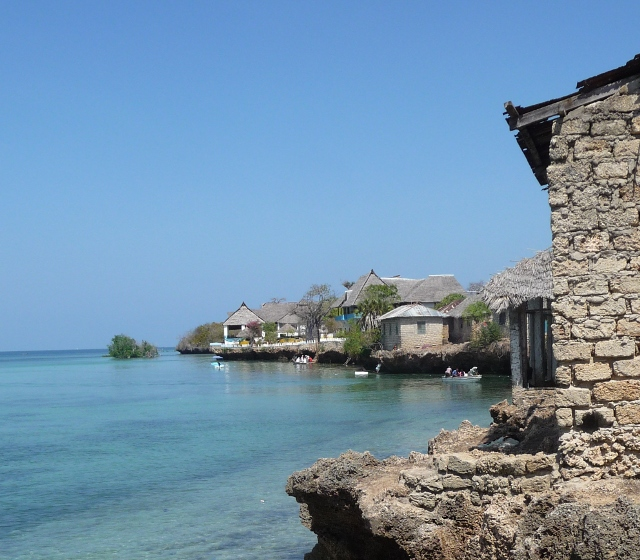
Seaside view from Wasini

Wasini Island lies off the coast of southeast Kenya 3 kilometres (1.9 mi) in the Indian Ocean, 75 kilometres (47 mi) south of Mombasa, and 3 kilometres (1.9 mi) opposite the harbour of the village of Shimoni. It is approximately 7 kilometres (4.3 mi) long and 3 kilometres (1.9 mi) across. The name "wasini mpunguti" came from the early inhabitants. The island has only footpaths of sharp old coral or sand. There are no cars, carts or bicycles. Cargo is transported by foot or by a wheelbarrow with a solid tyre. Transport is over the paths, or via the beaches, mainly consisting of coral and only passable with low tide, or by boat over the sea. Before 1963, in the British colonial time, there was an airstrip in the lagoon situated longitudinally south on the island; only small pieces of tarmac now remain.

== Population, culture, language and religion ==
The island has a population of about 3,000, living on the south coast in the two villages of Wasini and Mkwiro, respectively at the west and east side of the island, and inland in the hamlet Nyuma Maji, which means 'behind the water' in Swahili. In Wasini-village and Nyuma Maji live the Bantu people the Vumba, whose mother tongue is the Swahili dialect kivumba; in Mkwiro the Kifundi (Shirazi) have their own mother tongue, the Swahili dialect kikifundi. Besides that they all speak Swahili and sometimes English. The Vumba are of African and Arabic origin. The Arabs came to the East-African coast in the 1st century A.D., and after mixing with the Bantu people they together formed the Coast or Swahili people. The Shirazi probably came from the Persian Gulf in the 15th century A.D. Strong cultural connections and family ties exist between the island and the Tanzanian islands Pemba and Zanzibar, south-east of the island in the Indian Ocean. The population is for about 99% Muslim, from liberal to orthodox. (See note 1).

== Economy and tourism ==
Boat at Wasini Island-Kenya

Tourism is the main source of income; second comes fishing. The high poverty level has greatly diminished in the last 30 years due to the tourism based on the approximately 10 km far Kisite-Mpunguti Marine National Park. Here tourists snorkel and dive between the coral around this tiny sand island Kisite which is totally inundated during high tide. This park annually attracted 80.000 of overseas (75%) and African (25%) tourists. Unfortunately, since 2013 there is a decline of 50% in the number of overseas tourists, of which 75% are coming from Europe, because of their fear for Al-Shabaab and since 2014 also for the Ebola virus, although this virus was never detected outside West- Africa and Congo. In Wasini village approximately 50% of the people rely for their income on tourism, so 75% of the population. In Mwiro this percentage are 12%, and probably, 18% respectively.

The Kenya Wildlife Service is monitoring the Kisite Mpunguti Marine Park and is asking for an entry fee. These fees are not recirculated within the auspices of the collection area - instead they are remitted to their headquarters in Nairobi. The majority of visitors arrive on prepaid packages organised outside of the Island and outside of Shimoni. The larger operators are foreign owned. Many such organisations claim to operate responsible tourism - eco tourism. The tourist numbers generated in the area over the years are not monitored for environmental or socio economic impact.

Fishing is the second source of income. The fisherman are using open baskets put under water with stones and demarcated by mangrove poles hewn on the island and taken into their canoes, or are throwing fishing lines. They are fishing in the sometimes rough waters of the Pemba Channel, between Wasini and Pemba, and the more calm waters between the island and the mainland. Also there are several sports fishing vessels anchored on the shore of Shimoni at the Pemba Channel Club which pass into the Pemba Channel - a fishing ground famous for Kenya, winning All Africa and World IGFA fishing records. The presence of long liner fishing vessels offshore, rising water levels, destructive fishing methods using small seine nets and dynamite on reefs, have all had a detrimental impact on the fish reservoir.

Often humpback whales and dolphins can be spotted in the immediate surroundings of the island. Near the mainland humpback whales can regularly be seen swimming northbound on the East African current. At the east side of the island often dolphins are playing in the seawater. On the island itself at the shore opposite of Wasini village near the Kenyan Marine jetty beautiful coral fauna and flora can be seen and be examined while snorkeling; the Beach Management Unit is demanding an entrance fee of 5 US dollars or the equivalent in Kenyan shillings. North of the stairs of the jetty it is nice swimming because of the cool clear seawater there.

The harbour of Shimoni, 3 km. diagonal across the channel between the island and the mainland which contains the northward bound East-African current of the Indian Ocean coming from Cape Delgado in the north of Mozambique near the border with Tanzania. is deep enough for a natural port and the only one in this area for oceangoing trading dhows and fishing vessels. It is the stopping off point to reach Wasini island, and is some 75 km south of Mombasa. Port immigration and customs facilities are present and provide services for those trade dhows and people arriving from Tanzania, especially the island Pemba, or further afield. Twice a week there is a passenger transport service by boat to Weyte at Pemba; also it is possible to board a cargo dhow for payment to that harbour.

The Wasini Women Group has established a nature boardwalk in the beautiful coral gardens on the Western end. Proceeds help e.g. needy Wasini students and other Wasini citizens. In Mkwiro there is a well established, but rudimentary orphanage. These indigenous Non Government Organisations (NGO's) and self-help groups supplement activities across the water at Shimoni whereby visitors frequent the "Shimoni Slave Caves" - a community based project. Though it is questionable to what extent and what part both locations played in the slave trade, it is true to say that both were involved in it. In the caves live fruitbats who harbour the innocent Shimoni bat virus.

== Climate ==
Orientated west to east, Wasini lies about 500 km. south of the equator in the Indian Ocean and is every year blasted by the vigour of the northeast monsoon Kaskazi, which brings the long rains. In the other half of the year the southwest monsoon Kusi brings the short rains. Both monsoons were in the history propelling the trade sailing boats, the dhows from the direction of the Persian Gulf and India, and from the southern parts of East-Africa, and in the other half of the year propelling them back home.

== Public services ==
The island doesn't cater for boreholes as the source of fresh water; sweet water originating from a borehole lasts for only one week. There exist no piped drinking water. Instead eight rainwater catchments on the island were built, which are sufficient for the demand to fresh water; from there professional water carriers transport the water with their wheelbarrows to the private homes.

Kenya's power grid does not extend on the island neither are there public electricity generators, so increasingly people are putting privately owned solarpanels on their roofs to generate electric current.

Neither exists there a public sewer system. Deep holes are hacked in the coral rock until the groundwater is reached for building a pit latrine. Those pits are washed out twice a day across through the coralrock by the high tide of the sea. Is the distance short to the sea, the raw effluent will leak in the seawater, resulting in fecal contamination of the seawater near the shore of the villages. However, the longer the distance between the latrinepit and the sea, the more micro-organisms take the chance to clean the passing raw sewage material. Rubbish is not publicly collected although a NGO made a short-lived effort to improve this system. So people are giving their edible garbage to the goats, putting the remains in a compostpit and burn the non-biodegradable left overs. However, at the coast some people tend to dispose the non-biodegradable remains directly in the sea, resulting in floatsam - mainly items of plastic and rubber, but also big derooted wooden trunks and their branches- at the lower end with high tide. The inland lagoon near Nyuma Maji in the southern half of the island and the mangrove forests marshes entrap large quantities of flotsam floating in on the tides.

On the sandy mudflats in the west grows Shoreline Seaside Purslane, in Swahili called mboga pwani, "the vegetable of the ebb", with its official botanical name Sesuvium portulacastrum (See note 2). The island inhabitants cook this tasty and healthy sea vegetable as part of their Swahili dishes.

== Health ==
The island has two dispensaries, both staffed by one common community health nurse. There is a high infant mortality compared on the island with other parts of Kenya. The main diseases of the children are malaria, respiratory and gastrointestinal infections, while many adults suffer from diabetes mellitus, high blood pressure and gastric ulcer. The dispensaries provide some basic medicines, and give vaccinations to the children and health education to their mothers. For more complicated diseases and sophisticated medical care the inhabitants visit the private and state clinics at the mainland in Shimoni, Msambweni and Mombasa. They can reach these places by matatu. Private car taxis can also be called, but are mostly used by tourists because for the locals they are too expensive. For short distances also the taxi-motorbike, the piki-piki, can be rented.

== Security ==
Because of the high security on this sparsely populated island, there is no police. The nearest police post is at Shimoni on the mainland: 15 min. by boat.

Notes. 1) According to the private observations of a male Muslim villager, of the about 400 adult men in Wasini village, 32 or 8% visit five times a day the main mosque service, while on the holy Friday this number doubles to about 64 or 16%. 2) Determination confirmed by Prof. Dr. E.F.(Erik) Smets, Scientific Director - Botany P.O.Box 9517, 2300 RA Leiden, the Netherlands

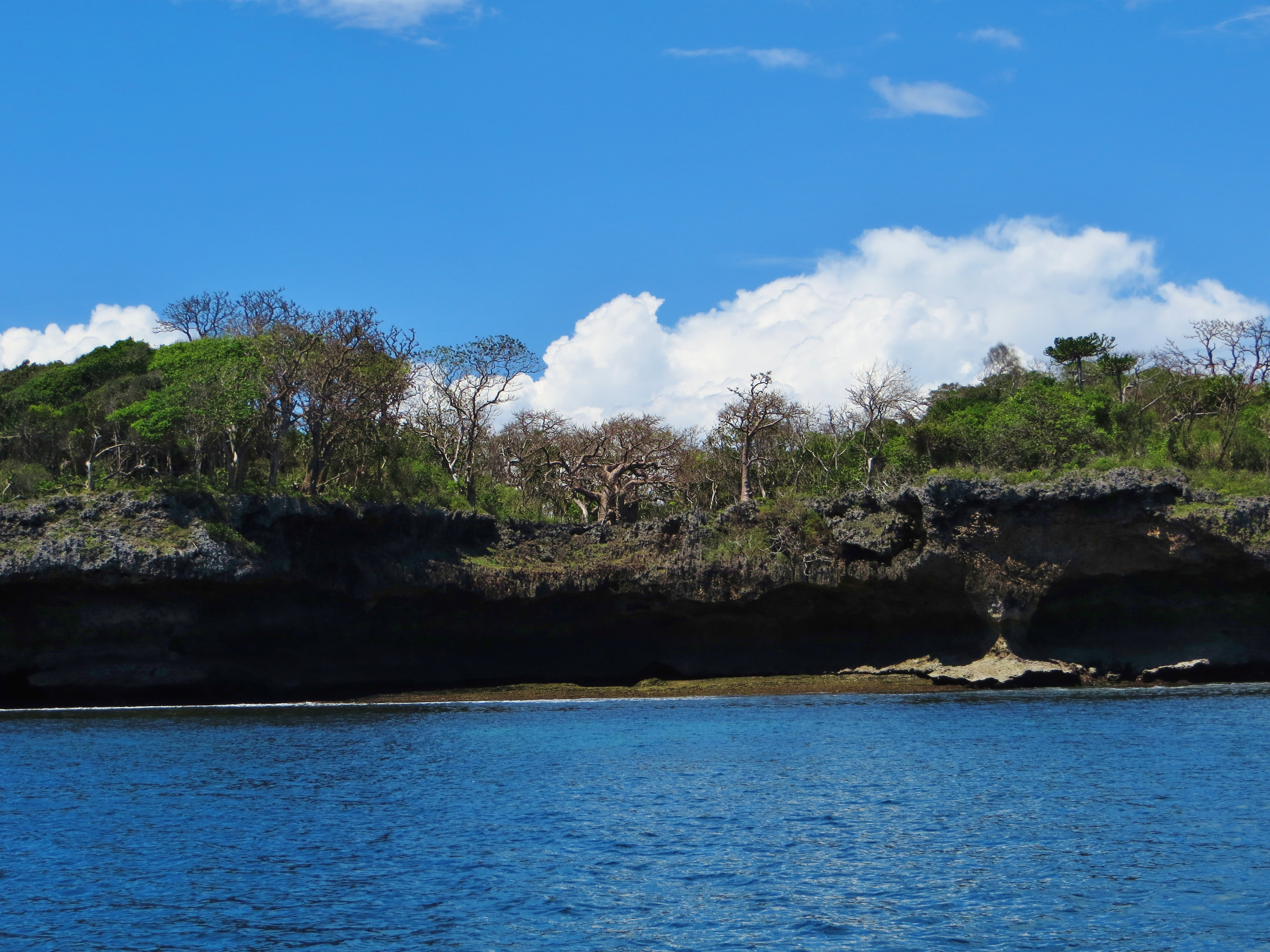
The island is located on a fossile coral reef, with Baobab trees growing on it.

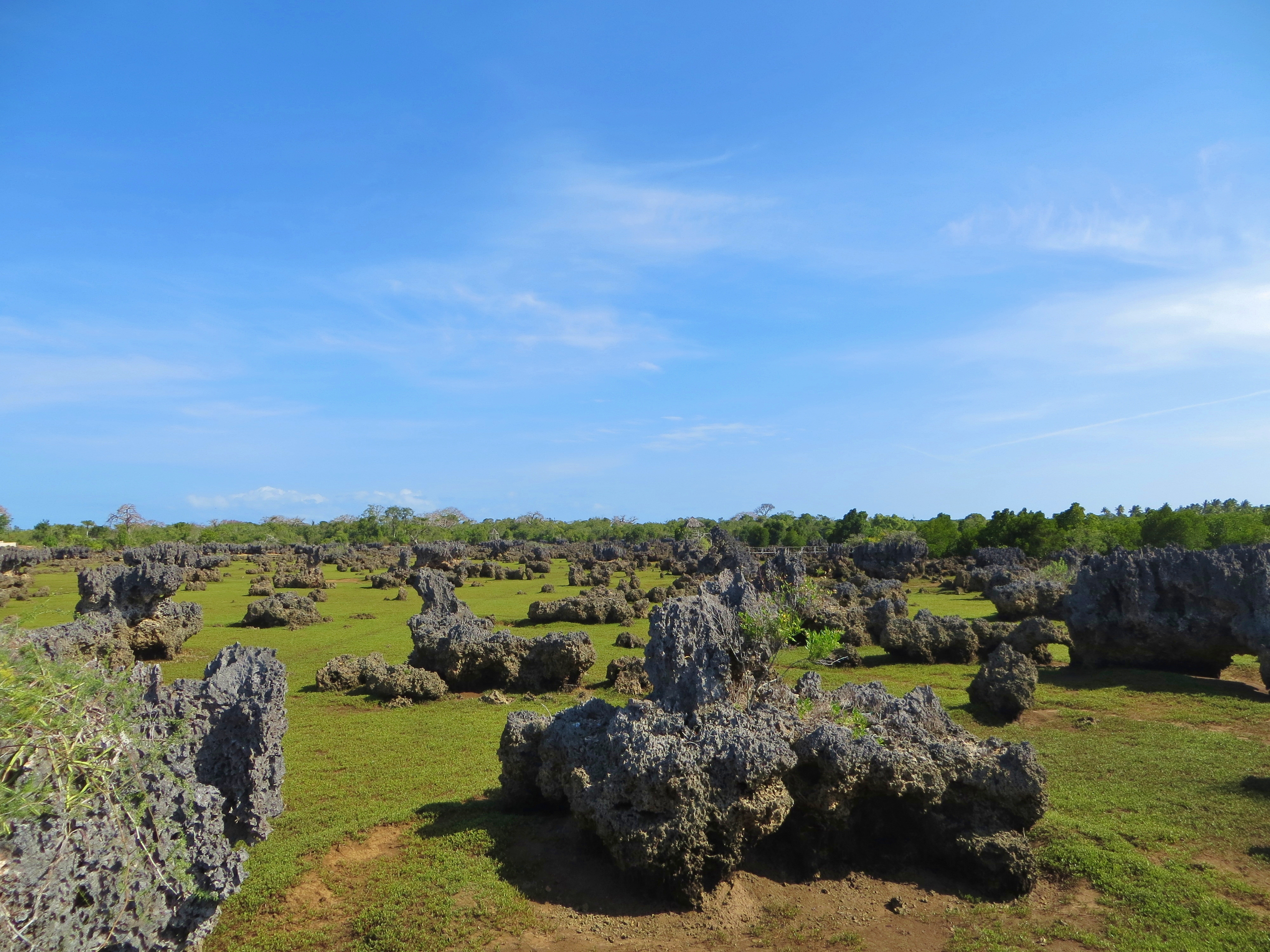
The coral garden at low tide.
