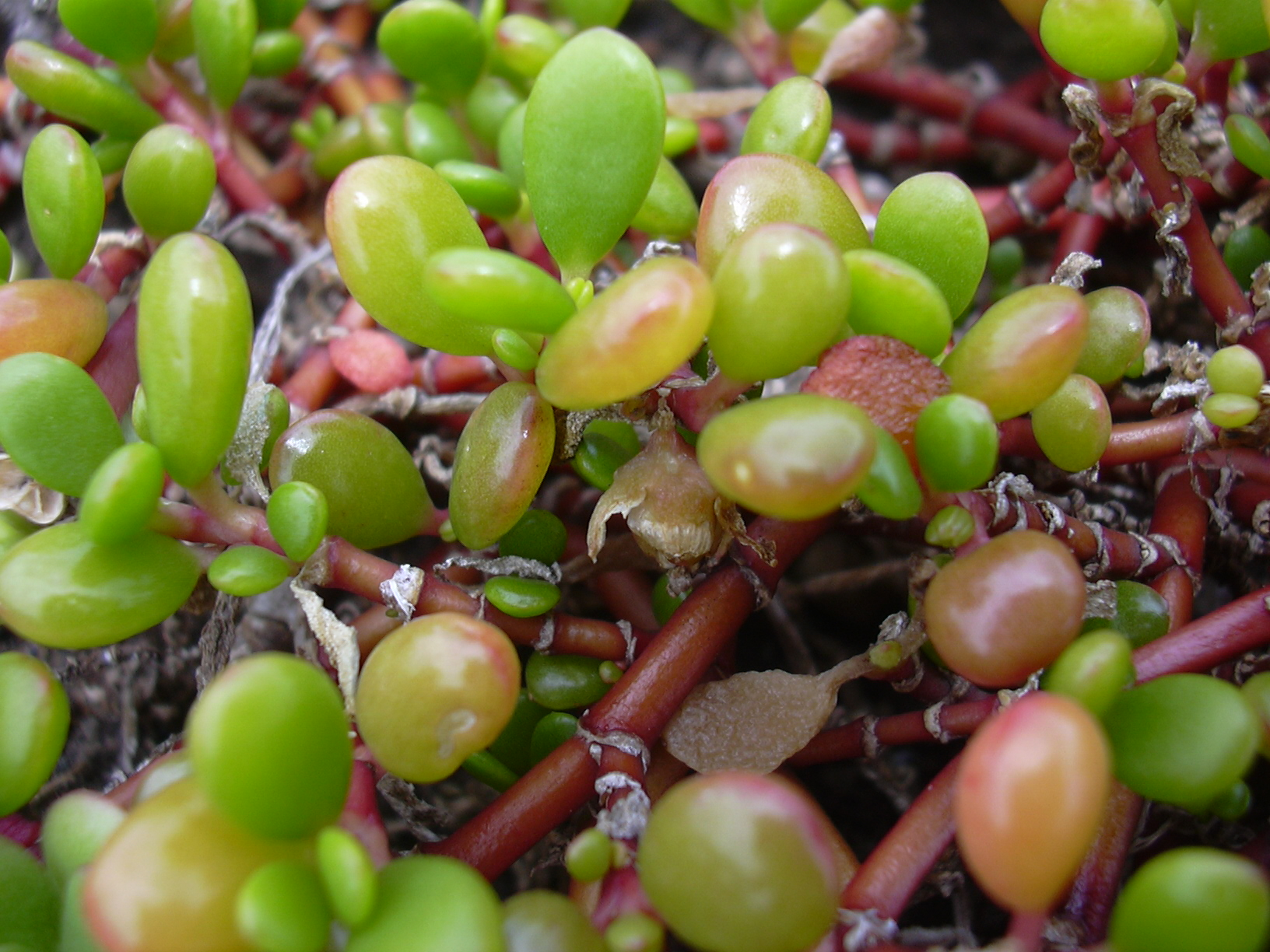
- Sesuvium portulacastrum

Scientific classification
- Kingdom: Plantae
- Clade: Tracheophytes
- Clade: Angiosperms
- Clade: Eudicots
- Order: Caryophyllales
- Family: Aizoaceae
- Subfamily: Sesuvioideae
- Genus: Sesuvium; L.

Species
- See text

Synonyms
- Cypselea Turpin; Halimus Rumph. ex Kuntze; Psammanthe Hance; Pyxipoma Fenzl; Radiana Raf.

= Sesuvium =

Genus of succulents

Sesuvium is a genus of flowering plants in the ice plant family, Aizoaceae. Its species are commonly known as sea-purslanes. The genus includes 14 species native to the tropics and subtropics around the world.

== Description ==
Raphides occur in at least the leaves and stalks of at least 3 species.

== Species ==
14 species are accepted.

- Sesuvium ayresii Marais
- Sesuvium congense Welw. ex Oliv.
- Sesuvium crithmoides Welw. – Tropical sea-purslane
- Sesuvium edmonstonei Hook.f. – Galápagos carpet weed
- Sesuvium humifusum (Turpin) Bohley & G.Kadereit
- Sesuvium hydaspicum (Edgew.) Gonç.
- Sesuvium maritimum (Walter) Britton, Sterns & Poggenb. – Slender sea-purslane
- Sesuvium mezianum (K.Müll.) Bohley & G.Kadereit
- Sesuvium parviflorum DC.
- Sesuvium portulacastrum (L.) L. – Shoreline sea-purslane
- Sesuvium revolutifolium Ortega (synonym Sesuvium verrucosum Raf.) – Verrucose sea-purslane
- Sesuvium rubriflorum (Urb.) Bohley & G.Kadereit
- Sesuvium sesuvioides (Fenzl) Verdc.
- Sesuvium trianthemoides Correll – Texas sea-purslane

== Bibliography ==
- Gulliver, George (1864). "Observations on Raphides and other Crystals". The Annals and Magazine of Natural History, Including Zoology, Botany, and Geology. Third Series. 14: 250–252.
