= Reproductive interference =

Reproductive interference is the interaction between individuals of different species during mate acquisition that leads to a reduction of fitness in one or more of the individuals involved. The interactions occur when individuals make mistakes or are unable to recognise their own species, labelled as ‘incomplete species recognition'. Reproductive interference has been found within a variety of taxa, including insects, mammals, birds, amphibians, marine organisms, and plants.

There are seven causes of reproductive interference, namely signal jamming, heterospecific rivalry, misdirected courtship, heterospecific mating attempts, erroneous female choice, heterospecific mating, and hybridisation. All types have fitness costs on the participating individuals, generally from a reduction in reproductive success, a waste of gametes, and the expenditure of energy and nutrients. These costs are variable and dependent on numerous factors, such as the cause of reproductive interference, the sex of the parent, and the species involved.

Reproductive interference occurs between species that occupy the same habitat and can play a role in influencing the coexistence of these species. It differs from competition as reproductive interference does not occur due to a shared resource. Reproductive interference can have ecological consequences, such as through the segregation of species both spatially and temporally. It can also have evolutionary consequences, for example; it can impose a selective pressure on the affected species to evolve traits that better distinguish themselves from other species.

== Causes of reproductive interference ==
Reproductive interference can occur at different stages of mating, from locating a potential mate, to the fertilisation of an individual of a different species. There are seven causes of reproductive interference that each have their own consequences on the fitness of one or both of the involved individuals.

=== Signal jamming ===
Signal jamming refers to the interference of one signal by another. Jamming can occur by signals emitted from environmental sources (e.g. noise pollution), or from other species. In the context of reproductive interference, signal jamming only refers to the disruption of the transmission or retrieval of signals by another species. The process of mate attraction and acquisition involves signals to aid in locating and recognising potential mates. Signals can also give the receiver an indication of the quality of a potential mate. Signal jamming can occur in different types of communication. Auditory signal jamming, otherwise labelled as auditory masking, is when a noisy environment created by heterospecific signals causes difficulties in identifying conspecifics. Likewise in chemical signals, pheromones that are meant to attract conspecifics and drive off others may overlap with heterospecific pheromones, leading to confusion. Difficulties in recognising and locating conspecifics can result in a reduction of encounters with potential mates and a decrease in mating frequencies.

==== Examples ====
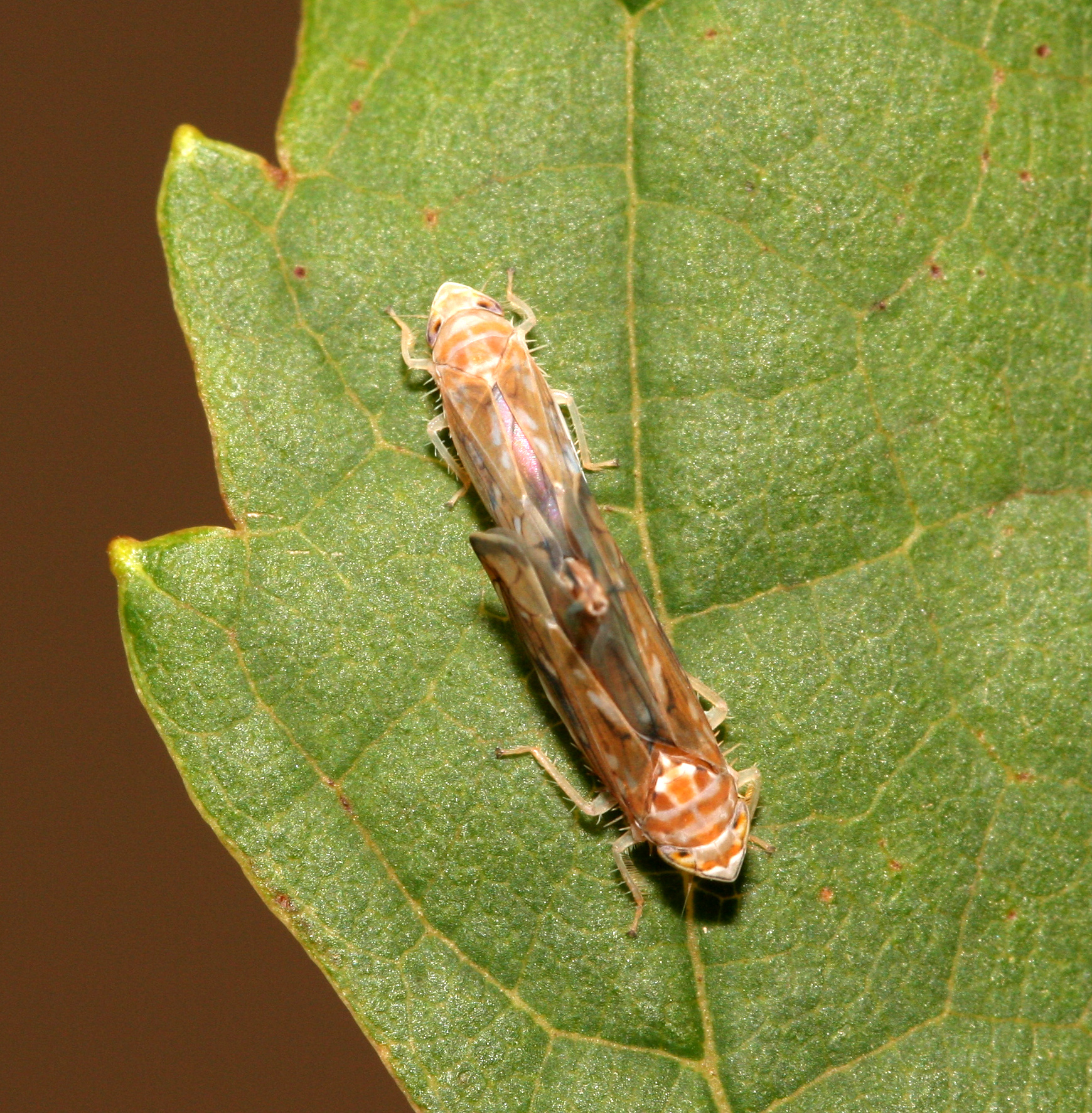
Pair of mating American grapevine leafhoppers (Scaphoideus titanus)

Vibrational signalling in the American grapevine leafhopper - Individuals of the American grapevine leafhopper communicate with each other through vibrational signals that they transmit through the host plant. American grapevine leafhoppers are receptive of signals within their receptor’s sensitivity range of 50 to 1000 Hz. The vibrations can be used to identify and locate potential female mates. To successfully communicate, a duet is performed between the male and female American grapevine leafhopper. The female replies within a specific timeframe after the male signal, and the male may use the timing of her reply to identify her. However, vibrational signals are prone to disruption and masking by heterospecific signals, conspecific signals, and background noise that are within their species-specific sensitivity range. The interference of the duet between a male and female American grapevine leafhopper can reduce the male’s success in identifying and locating the female, which can reduce the frequency of mating.

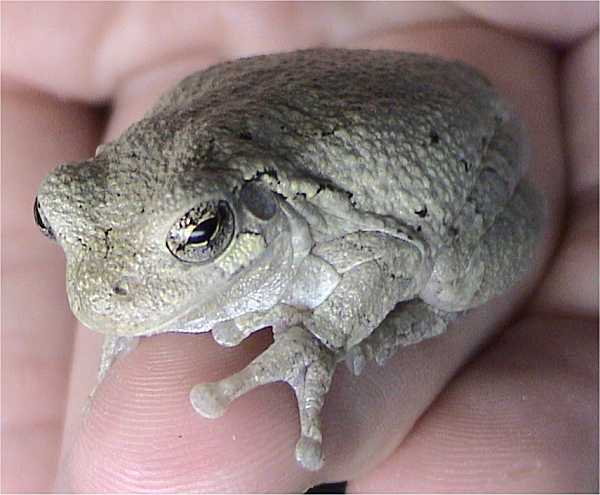
Gray treefrog (Hyla versicolor)

Auditory signalling in the gray treefrog (Hyla versicolor) and the Cope's gray treefrogs (Hyla chrysoscelis) – The success of reproduction is dependent on a female’s ability to correctly identify and respond to the advertisement call of a potential mate. At a breeding site with high densities of males, the male’s chorus may overlap with heterospecific calls, making it difficult for the female to successfully locate a mate. When the advertisement calls of the male gray treefrog and male Cope’s gray treefrog overlap, female gray treefrogs make mistakes and choose the heterospecific call. The amount of errors the female makes is dependent on the amount of overlap between signals. Female Cope’s gray treefrogs can better differentiate the signals and are only significantly affected when heterospecifics completely overlap conspecific male signals. However, female Cope’s gray treefrogs prefer conspecific male signals that have less overlap (i.e. less interference). Furthermore, females have longer response times to overlapped calls, where it takes longer for them to choose a mate. Signal jamming can affect both males and females as difficulties in identifying and locating a mate reduces their mating frequencies. Females may have more costs if they mate with a male of a lower quality, and may be susceptible to a higher risk of predation by predators within the breeding site if they take longer to choose and locate a male. Heterospecific mating between the gray treefrog and Cope’s gray treefrogs also can form an infertile hybrid which is highly costly to both parents due to the wastage of gametes.

Chemical signalling in ticks – Female ticks produce a pheromone that is a species-specific signal to attract conspecific males that are attached to the host. Female ticks also produce a pheromone that is not species-specific which can attract males that are in a close proximity to her. Pheromones emitted from closely related species can mix and lead to interference. Three species of ticks: Aponomma hydrosauri, Amblyomma albolimbatum, and Amblyomma limbatum, are closely related and can interfere with one another when attached to the same host. When two of the species of tick are attached on the same host, males have difficulties locating a female of the same species, potentially due to the mixing of pheromones. The pheromone that is not species-specific also has the capability of attracting males of all three species when they are in close proximity to the female. The presence of a heterospecific female can also reduce the time a male spends with conspecific females, leading to a reduction of reproductive success. Furthermore, when Amblyomma albolimbatum males attach to Aponomma hydrosauri females to mate, despite being unsuccessful, they remain attached which physically inhibits following males from mating.

=== Heterospecific rivalry ===
Heterospecific rivalry occurs between males, when a male of a different species is mistaken as a rival for mates (i.e. mistaken for a conspecific male). In particular, heterospecific rivalry is hard to differentiate from other interspecific interactions, such as the competition over food and other resources. Costs to the mistaken males can include the wastage of time and energy, and a higher risk of injury and predation if they leave their mating territory to pursue the heterospecific male. Males that chase off a heterospecific male may also leave females exposed to following intruders, whether it be a conspecific or heterospecific male.

==== Examples ====
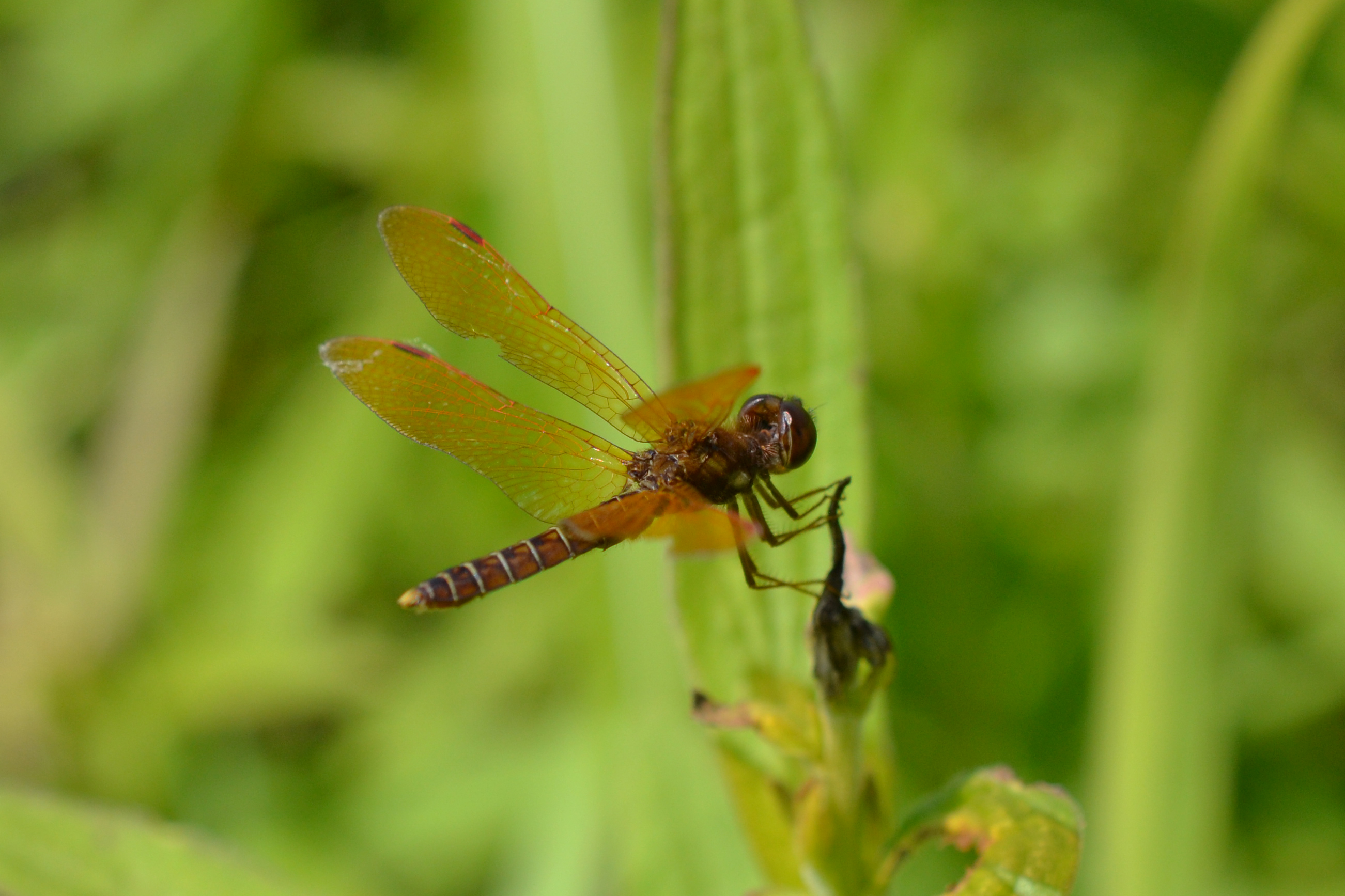
The Eastern amberwing dragonfly (Perithemis tenera)

Eastern amberwing dragonfly (Perithemis tenera) – Male Eastern amberwing dragonflies are territorial as they defend mating territories from rival conspecific males. The male will perch around their territory and pursue conspecifics that fly near the perch. When the male is approached by a species of horsefly and butterfly, they are similarly pursued. The horsefly and butterfly do not compete over a common resource with the Eastern amberwing dragonfly, have not been seen interfering with the mating within the territory, and are neither a predator nor prey of the Eastern amberwing dragonfly. Instead, they are pursued potentially due to being mistaken for a rival conspecific as they share similar characteristics in size, colour, and flight height. The similar characteristics may be cues used by the male Eastern amberwing dragonfly to identify conspecifics. The heterospecific pursuit is costly for the male as they waste energy and time, have a higher risk of injury, and may lose opportunities to defend their territory against subsequent intruders.

=== Misdirected courtship ===
Misdirected courtship occurs when males display courtship towards individuals of a different species of either sex. The misdirection is caused by a mistake during species recognition, or by an attraction towards heterospecifics that possess desirable traits. Such desirable traits are those traits that normally are an indicator of conspecific mate quality, such as body size. Costs associated with misdirecting courtship for males include the wasted energy investment in the attempt to court heterospecifics, and a decrease in mating frequency within species.

==== Examples ====
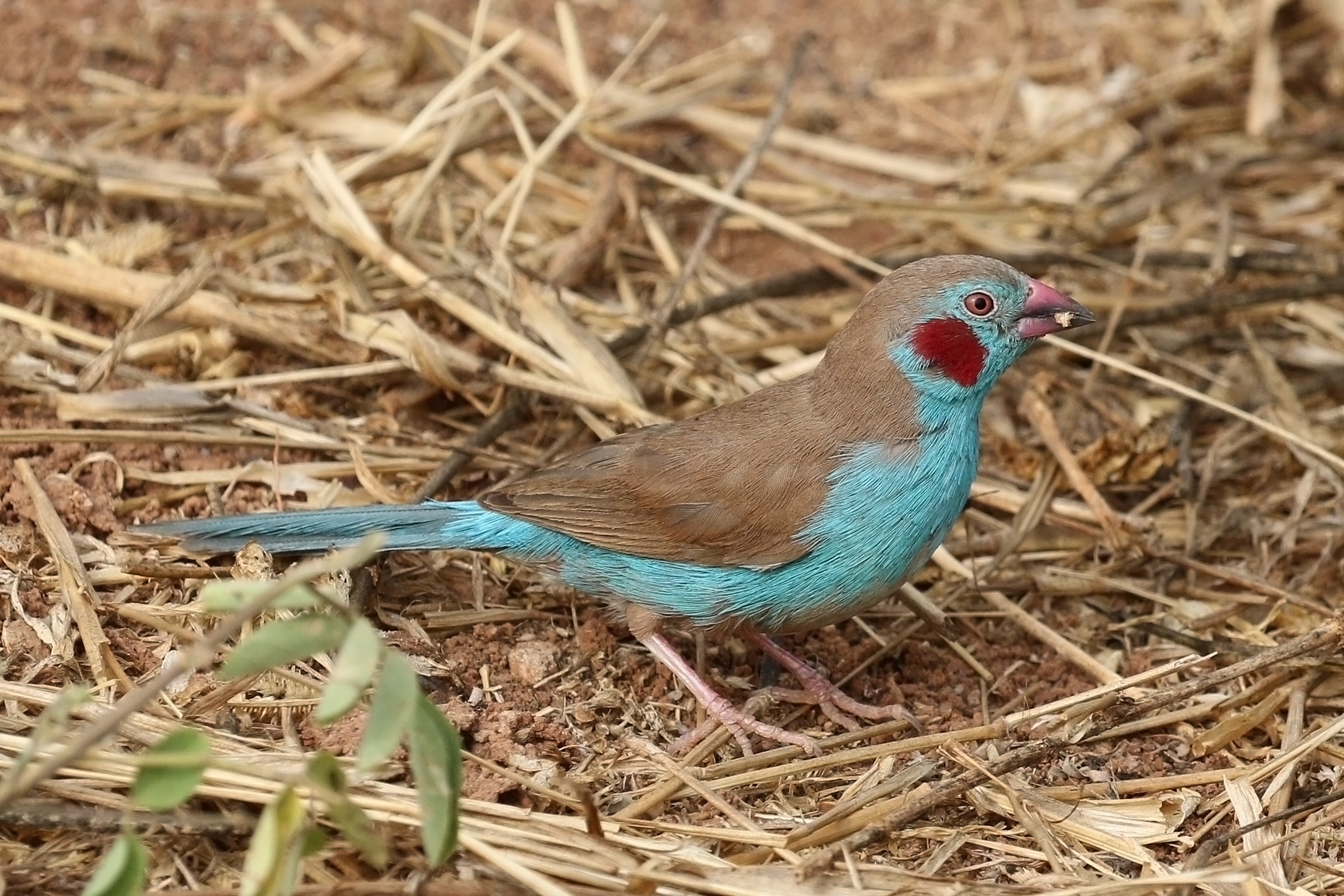
Red cheek (Uraeginthus angolensis)

Waxbill – Waxbills are monogamous, where an individual only has one partner. Parents also display biparental care, where both the mother and father contribute to the care of the offspring. The combination of monogamy and biparental investment suggest that both male and female waxbills should be ‘choosy’ and have strong preferences to reduce the chances of mating with a heterospecific female. Males of the three species of waxbill: blue breast (Uraeginthus angolensis), red cheek (Uraeginthus bengalus), and blue cap (Uraeginthus cyanocephalus), have differing strengths of preferences for conspecific females when also presented with a heterospecific female. The differing preferences is affected by the body size of the females, potentially due to body size being an indicator of fecundity, which is the ability to produce offspring. Blue breast males prefer conspecifics over red cheek females that are smaller; however, have a weaker preference for conspecifics over blue breast females that are only slightly smaller. Red cheek males have no preference for conspecifics in the presence of a larger blue breast female or blue cap female. Blue cap males prefer conspecifics over red cheek females; however, have no preference for conspecifics in the presence of a larger blue breast male.

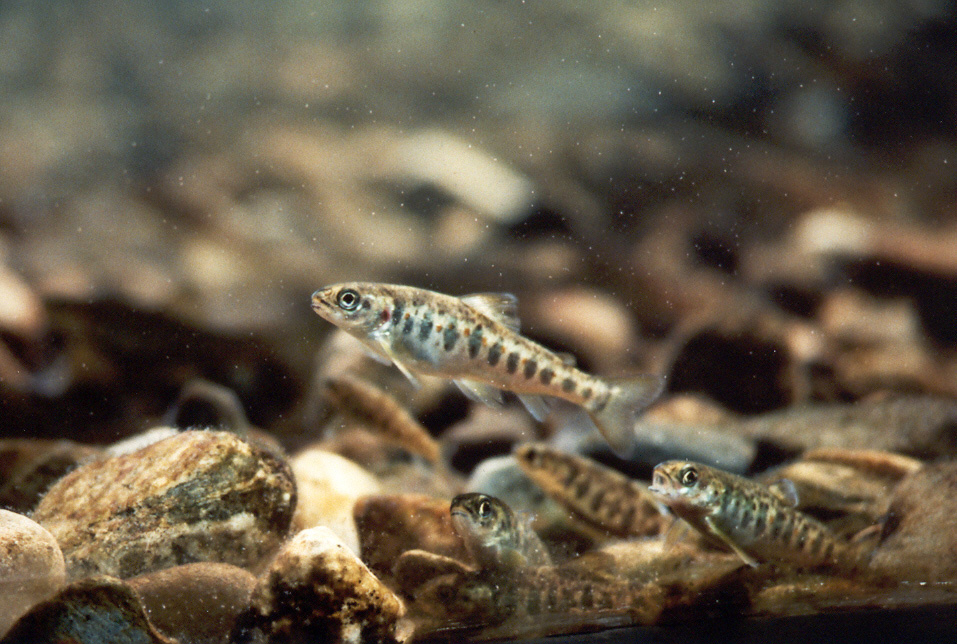
Atlantic salmon (Salmo salar)

Atlantic salmon (Salmo salar) – Atlantic salmon that were once native to Lake Ontario were reintroduced to the lake to study their spawning interactions with other species of fish, including the chinook salmon, coho salmon, and brown trout. Chinook salmon interacted with Atlantic salmon the most, where male chinooks attempted to court female Atlantic salmon. Male chinooks also chased away, and in some interactions, behaved aggressively towards other Atlantic salmon that approached female Atlantic salmon. A male brown trout was also observed to court a female Atlantic salmon. Misdirected courtship towards the Atlantic salmon can cause problems in waters that the Atlantic salmon currently occupy, and towards conservation efforts to reintroduce the Atlantic salmon to Lake Ontario. Implications of misdirected courtship on the Atlantic salmon can cause the delay or prevention of spawning, and the hybridisation of the Atlantic salmon with other species.

=== Heterospecific mating attempts ===
Heterospecific mating attempts occur when males attempt to mate with females of a different species, regardless of whether courtship occurs. During each mating attempt, sperm transfer may or may not occur. Both sexes have costs when a heterospecific attempts to mate. Costs associated with heterospecific mating attempts include wasted energy, time, and potentially gametes if sperm transfer occurs. There is also a risk of injury and increased risk of predation for both sexes.

==== Examples ====
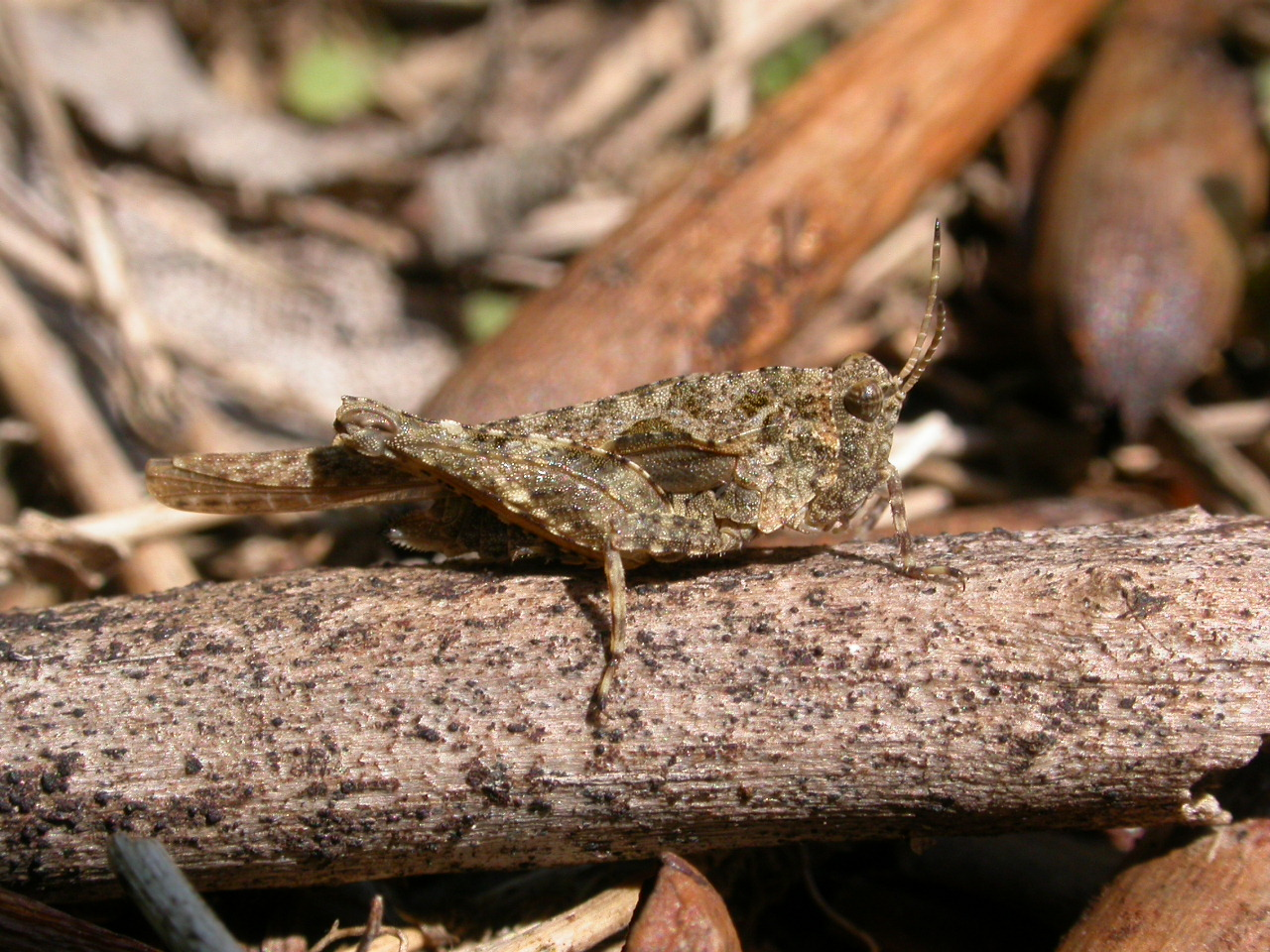
The Cepero's grasshopper (Tetrix ceperoi).

Cepero's grasshopper (Tetrix ceperoi) and the slender groundhopper (Tetrix subulata) – Naturally the distribution of the Cepero’s grasshopper and slender groundhopper overlap; however, they rarely co-exist. The reproductive success of the Cepero’s grasshopper decreases when housed within the same enclosure as high numbers of the slender groundhopper. The reduction of reproductive success stems from an increase in mating attempts by the Cepero's grasshopper towards the slender groundhopper, which may be due to their larger body size. However, these mating attempts are generally unsuccessful as the mate recognition of female slender groundhoppers are reliable, which may be due to the different courtship displays of the two species. The reduced reproductive success can cause the displacement in one of the species, potentially a factor as to why the species rarely co-exist despite sharing similar habitat preferences.

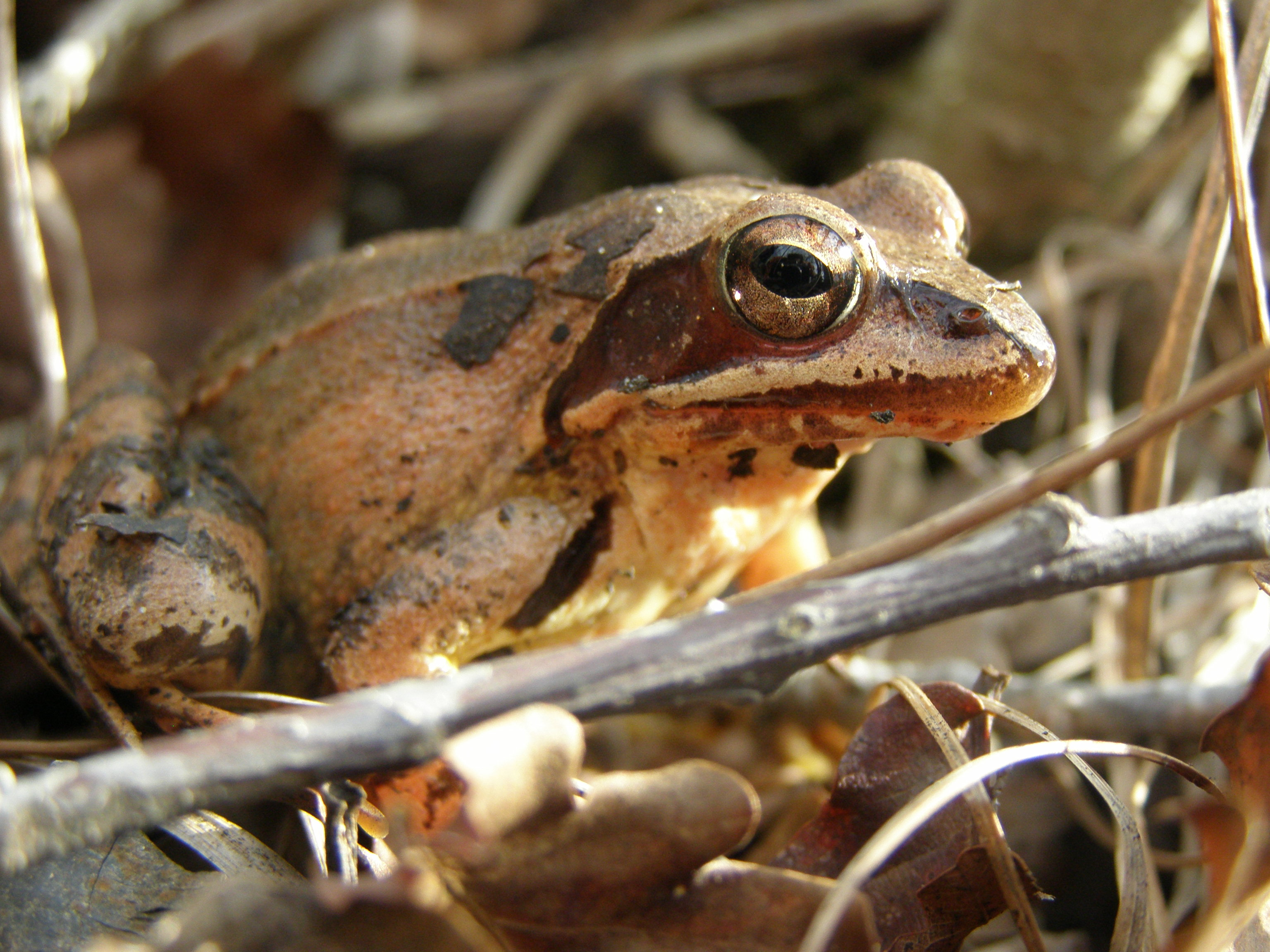
Agile frog (Rana dalmatina)

Italian agile frog (Rana latastei) - The distribution of Italian agile frog and the agile frog (Rana dalmatina) overlap naturally in ponds and drainage ditches. In the areas of overlap, the abundance of agile frogs is higher than Italian agile frogs. When there is a higher abundance of agile frogs, the mating between Italian agile frogs is interfered with. Male agile frogs attempt to displace male Italian agile frogs during amplexus, which is a type of mating position where the male grasps onto the female. The Italian agile frog and agile frog have been seen in amplexus when co-existing. The mating attempts by the agile frog reduces the reproductive success of the Italian agile frog. The Italian agile frog also produces a lower number of viable eggs in the presence of the agile frog, potentially due to sperm competition between the male Italian agile frog and agile frog.

Species and sex-recognition errors among true toads are very well studied. Toads are known to have amplexus with species from other genera in the same family, and species belonging to other families. Hybridization cases have also been reported among toads.

=== Erroneous female choice ===
Erroneous female choice refers to mistakes made by females when differentiating males of the same species from males of a different species. Female choice may occur at different stages of mating, including male courtship, copulation, or after copulation. Female choice can depend on the availability of appropriate males. When there are less available conspecific males, females may make more mistakes as they become less ‘choosy’.

==== Examples ====
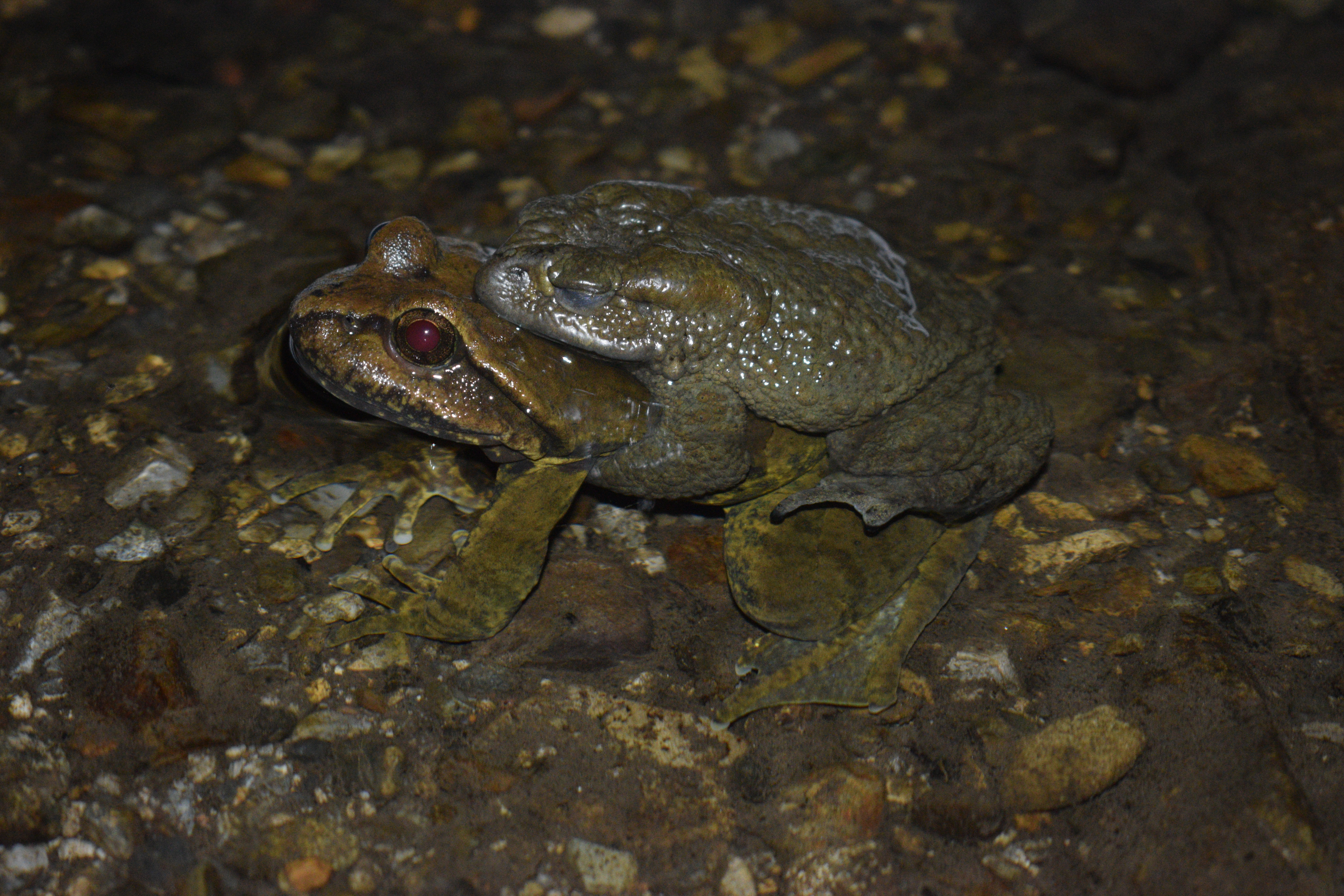
Interspecific amplexus between a Himalayan Toad (Duttaphrynus himalayanus) and a Himalayan Paa Frog (Nanorana vicina)

Striped ground cricket (Allonemobius fasciatus) and Southern ground cricket (Allonemobius socius) - The striped ground cricket and the Southern ground cricket are closely related species that have an overlapping distribution. Both crickets use calling songs in order to identify and locate potential mates. The songs of the two species have a different frequency and period. Females of both species show little preference between the songs from conspecific and heterospecific males. The minor preference disappears if the intensity of the calls are altered. The lack of ability to differentiate between the two songs can result in erroneous female choice. Erroneous female choice has costs, including energy wastage, and increases in predation risk when searching for a conspecific. Additionally, it is highly costly when the mistake leads to heterospecific mating, which involves the wastage of gametes. However, the cost of erroneous female choice may be small for the striped ground and Southern ground cricket due to their high abundance. The lack of ability to differentiate between the calling songs is proposed to be due to the weak selective pressure on the females.

=== Heterospecific mating ===
Heterospecific mating is when two individuals from different species mate. After the male transfers his sperm into the heterospecific female, different processes can occur that may change the outcome of the copulation. Heterospecific mating may result in the production of a hybrid in some pairings. Costs associated to heterospecific mating include the wastage of time, energy, and gametes.

==== Examples ====
Spider mites – two closely related Panonychus mites: the Panonychus citri and Panonychus mori, are generally geographically segregated and on occasion co-exist. However, the co-existence is not stable as the Panonychus mori is eventually excluded. The exclusion is a result of reproductive interference and also due to the higher reproductive rate of the Panonychus citri. Heterospecific mating occurs between the two species which can produce infertile eggs or infertile hybrid females. Furthermore, females are not able to produce female offspring after mating with a heterospecific. In addition to the wastage of energy, time, and gametes, the inability to produce female offspring after heterospecific mating skews the sex ratio of the co-existing populations. The high costs associated with heterospecific mating along with the higher reproductive rate of the Panonychus citri lead to the displacement of the Panonychus mori.

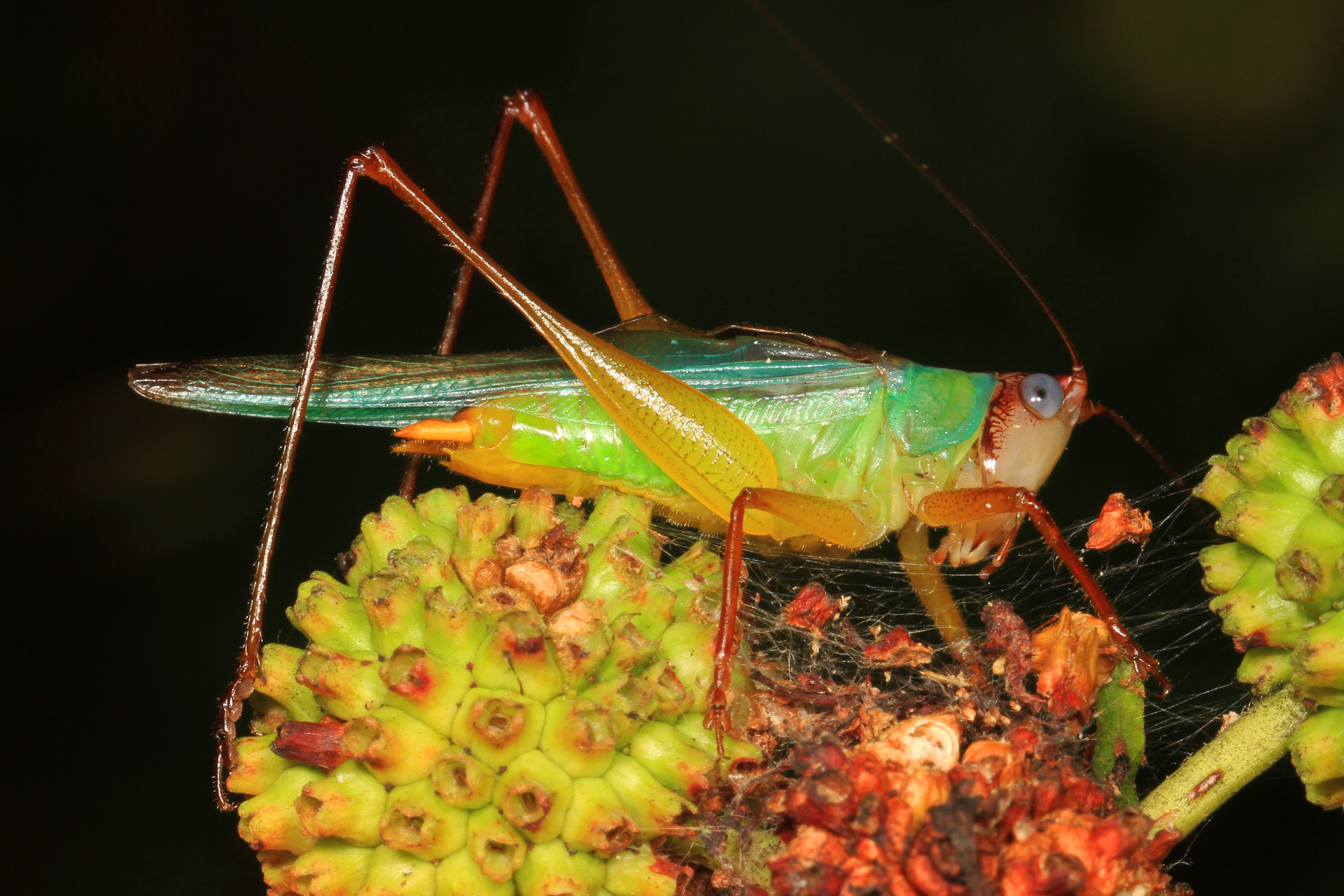
Handsome Meadow Katydid (Orchelimum pulchellum)

Black-legged meadow katydid (Orchelimum nigripes) and the handsome meadow katydid (Orchelimum pulchellum) – The two closely related species of katydid have the same habitat preferences and co-exist along the Potomac River. Females of both species that mate heterospecifically have a large reduction in fecundity compared to conspecific pairings. Heterospecific mating either produces no eggs or male hybrids that may be sterile. Both individuals suffer a large fitness cost from the wastage of energy, time, and gametes, as they unsuccessfully pass on their genes. However, females may be able to offset this cost through multiple mating, as they receive nutritional benefits from consuming a nuptial food gift from the male, otherwise known as the spermatophylax.

=== Hybridisation ===
Hybridisation, in the context of reproductive interference, is defined as the mating between individuals of different species that can lead to a hybrid, an inviable egg, or an inviable offspring. The frequency of hybridisation increases if it is hard to recognise potential mates, especially when heterospecifics share similarities, such as body size, colouration, and acoustic signals. Costs associated with hybridisation are dependent on the level of parental investment and on the product of the pairing (hybrid). Hybrids have the potential to become invasive if they develop traits that make them more successful than their parent species in surviving within new and changing habitats, otherwise known as hybrid vigor or heterosis. Compared to each individual parent species, they hold a different combination of characteristics that can be more adaptable and 'fit' within particular environments. If an inviable product is produced, both parents suffer from the cost of unsuccessfully passing on their genes.

==== Examples ====
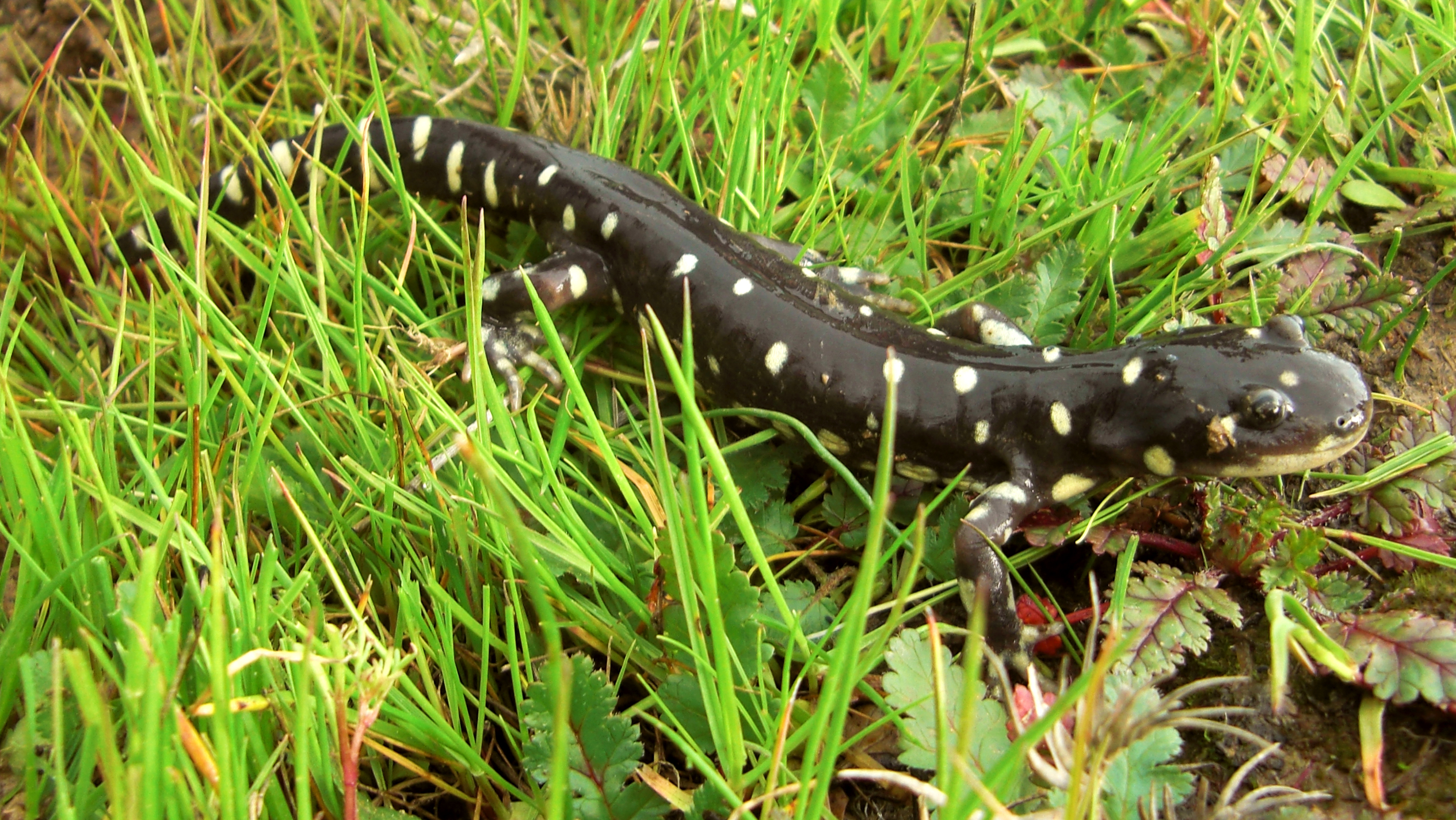
California Tiger Salamander (Ambystoma californiense)

California Tiger Salamanders (Ambystoma californiense) x Barred Tiger Salamanders (Ambystoma mavortium) - California tiger salamanders are native to California, and were geographically isolated from Barred tiger salamanders. Barred tiger salamanders were then introduced by humans to California, and the mating between these two species led to the formation of a population of hybrids. The hybrids have since established in their parent habitat and spread into human modified environments. Within hybrids, the survivability of individuals with a mixed-ancestry is higher than individuals with a highly native or highly introduced genetic background. Stable populations can form as populations with a large native ancestry become mixed with more introduced genes, and vice versa. Hybrids pose both ecological and conservation consequences as they threaten the population viability of the native California tiger salamanders, which is currently listed as an endangered species. The hybrids may also affect the viability of other native organisms within the invaded regions, as they consume large quantities of aquatic invertebrate and tadpole.

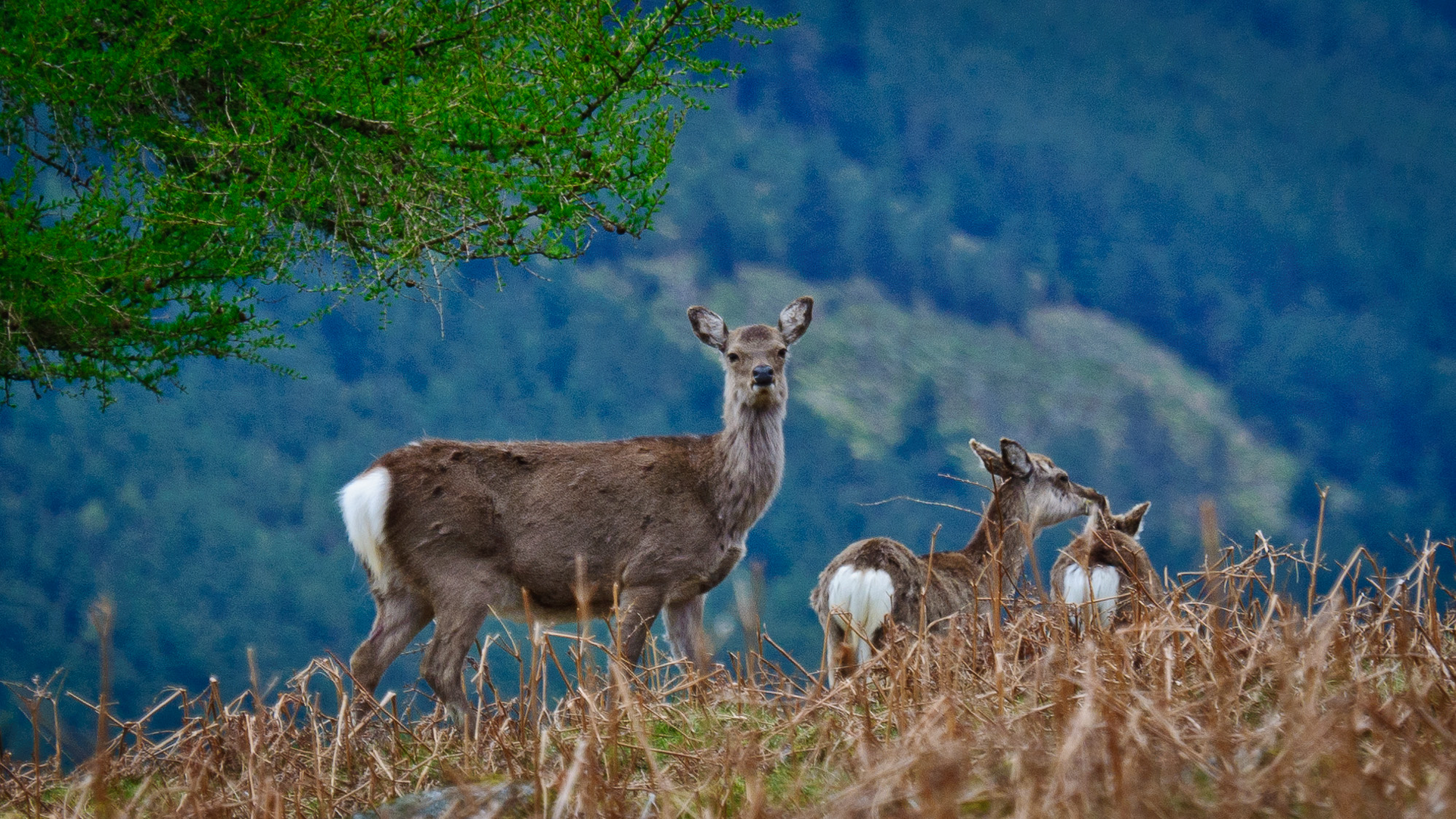
Red deer (Cervus elaphus) x Sika deer (Cervus nippon) hybrid

Red deer (Cervus elaphus) x sika deer (Cervus nippon) - The sika deer were originally introduced by humans to Britain and has since established and spread through deliberate reintroductions and escape. The red deer are native to Britain and hybridise with the sika deer in areas which they co-exist. Heterospecific mating between the red deer and sika deer can produce viable hybrids. Sika deer and the hybrids may outcompete and displace native deer from dense woodland. As the complete eradication of sika and the hybrids is impractical, management efforts are directed at minimising spread by not planting vegetation that would facilitate their spread into regions where the red deer still persist.
