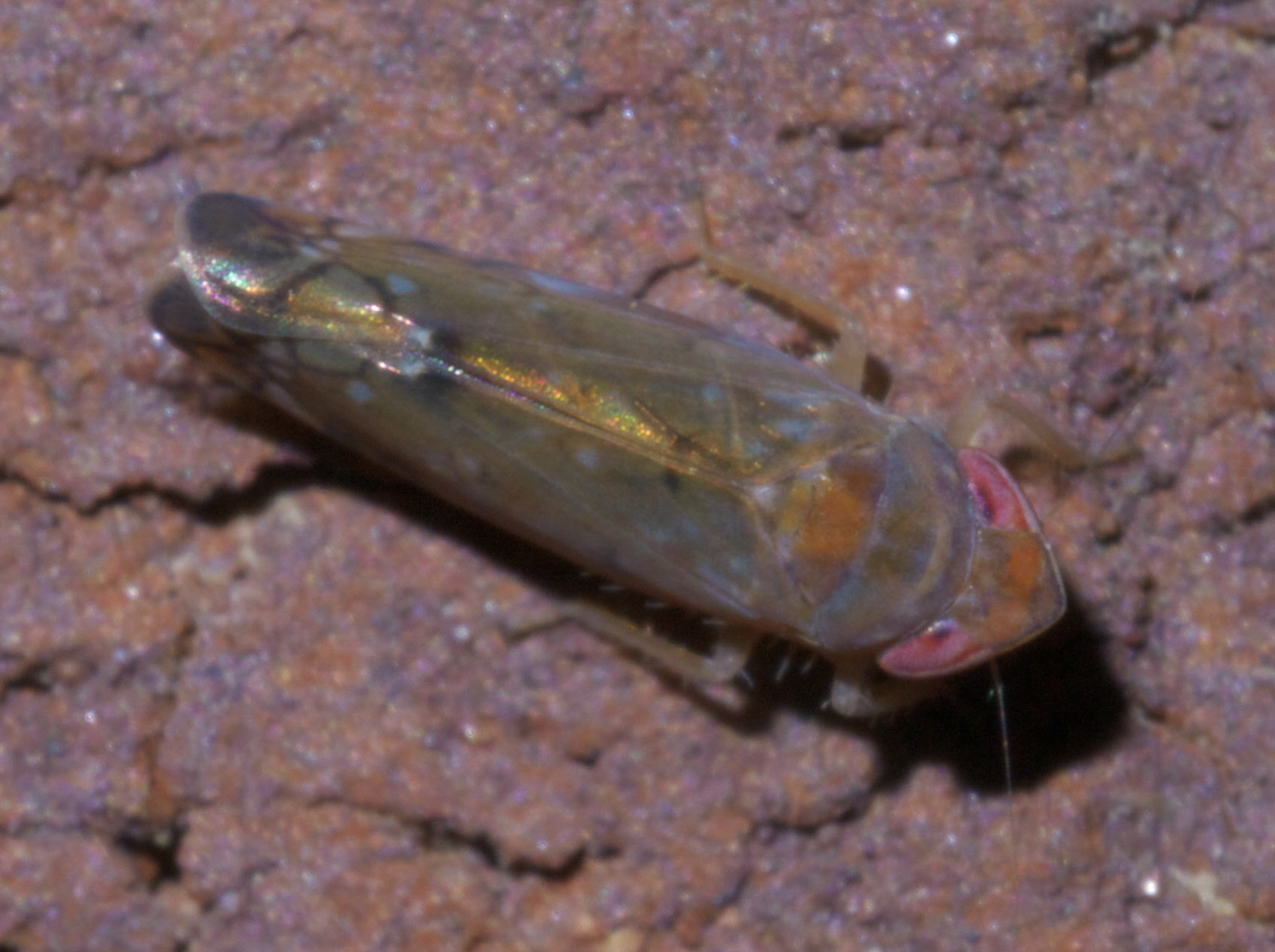

Scientific classification
- Domain: Eukaryota
- Kingdom: Animalia
- Phylum: Arthropoda
- Class: Insecta
- Order: Hemiptera
- Suborder: Auchenorrhyncha
- Family: Cicadellidae
- Genus: Scaphoideus
- Species: S. atlantus

Binomial name
- Scaphoideus atlantus Ball, 1932

= Scaphoideus atlantus =

Species of true bug

Scaphoideus atlantus is a species of leafhopper in the family Cicadellidae.

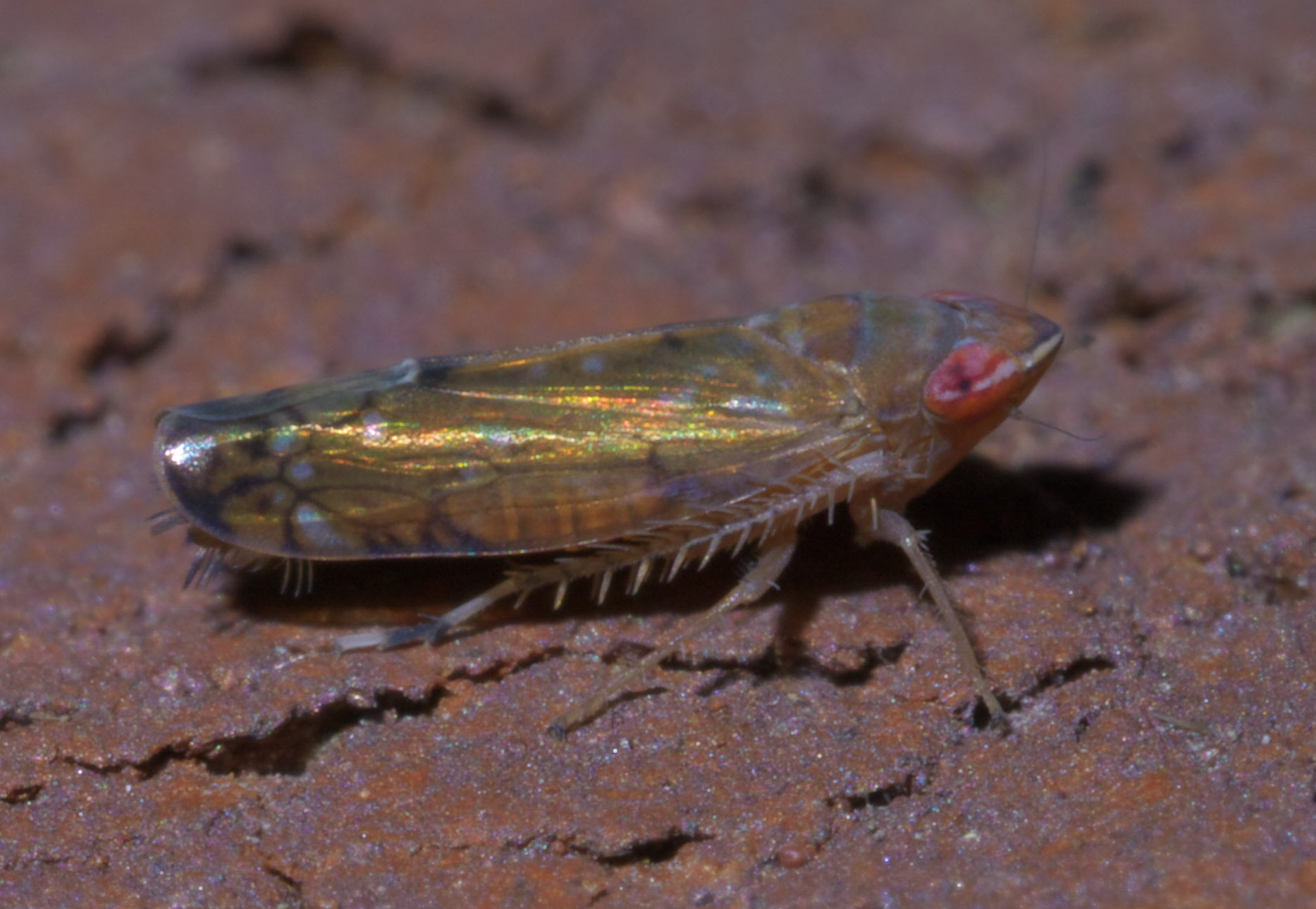

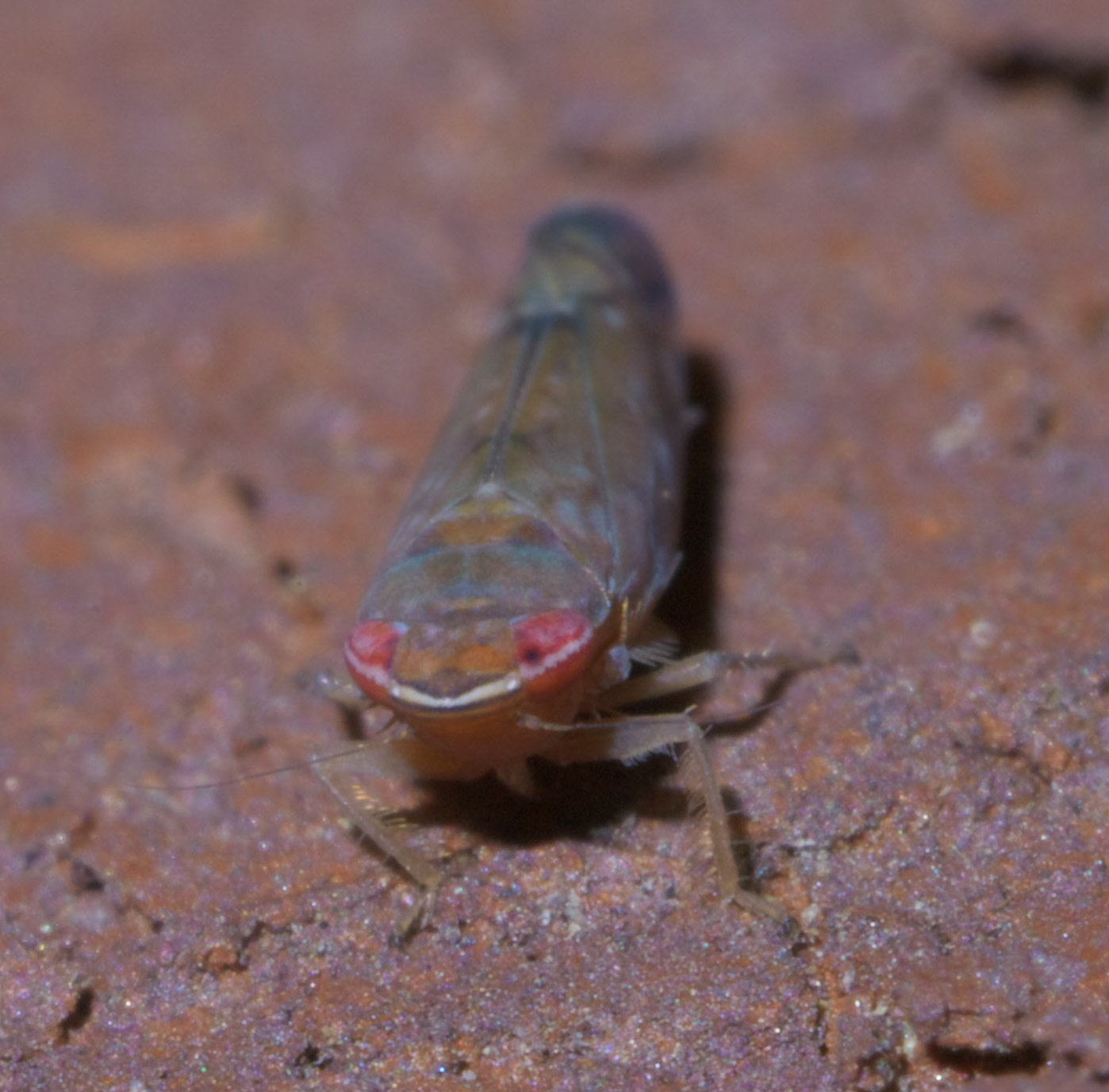
