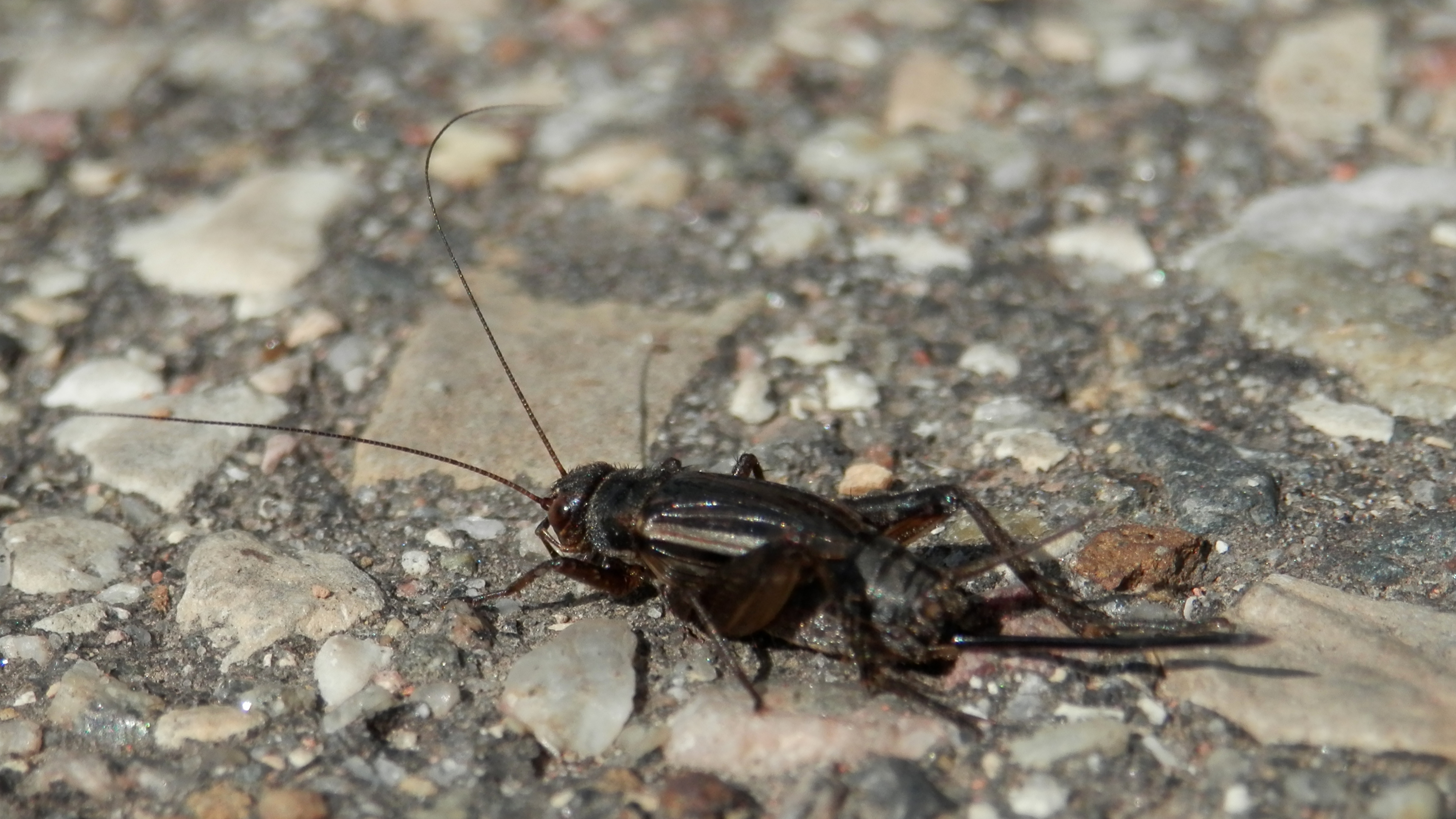

Scientific classification
- Domain: Eukaryota
- Kingdom: Animalia
- Phylum: Arthropoda
- Class: Insecta
- Order: Orthoptera
- Suborder: Ensifera
- Family: Trigonidiidae
- Genus: Allonemobius
- Species: A. allardi

Binomial name
- Allonemobius allardi (Alexander & Thomas, 1959)

= Allonemobius allardi =

Species of cricket

Allonemobius allardi, commonly known as Allard's ground cricket, is a species of ground cricket in the family Gryllidae. It is found in North America.
