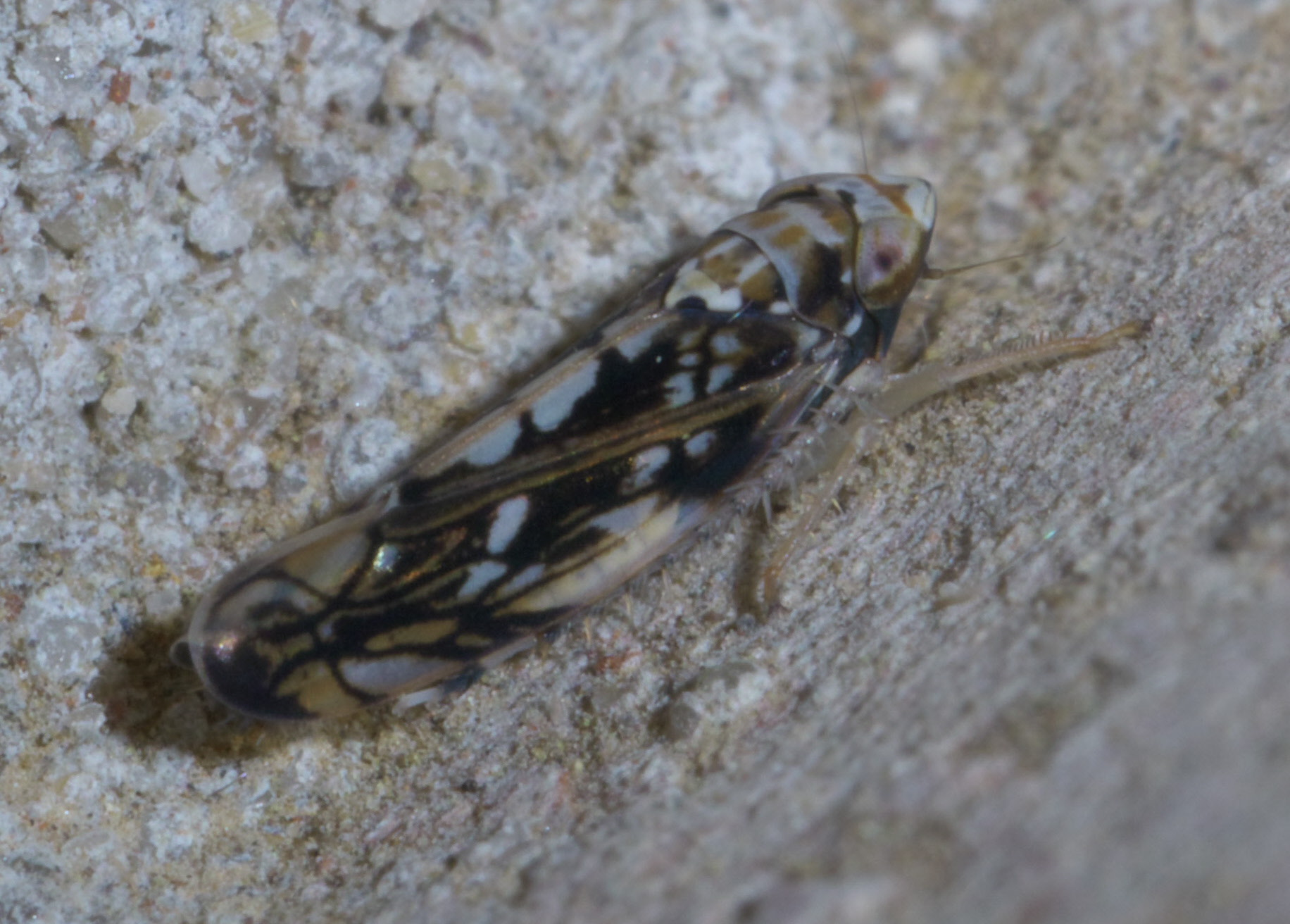

Scientific classification
- Domain: Eukaryota
- Kingdom: Animalia
- Phylum: Arthropoda
- Class: Insecta
- Order: Hemiptera
- Suborder: Auchenorrhyncha
- Family: Cicadellidae
- Genus: Scaphoideus
- Species: S. pullus

Binomial name
- Scaphoideus pullus DeLong & Mohr, 1936

= Scaphoideus pullus =

Species of true bug

Scaphoideus pullus is a species of leafhopper in the family Cicadellidae.
