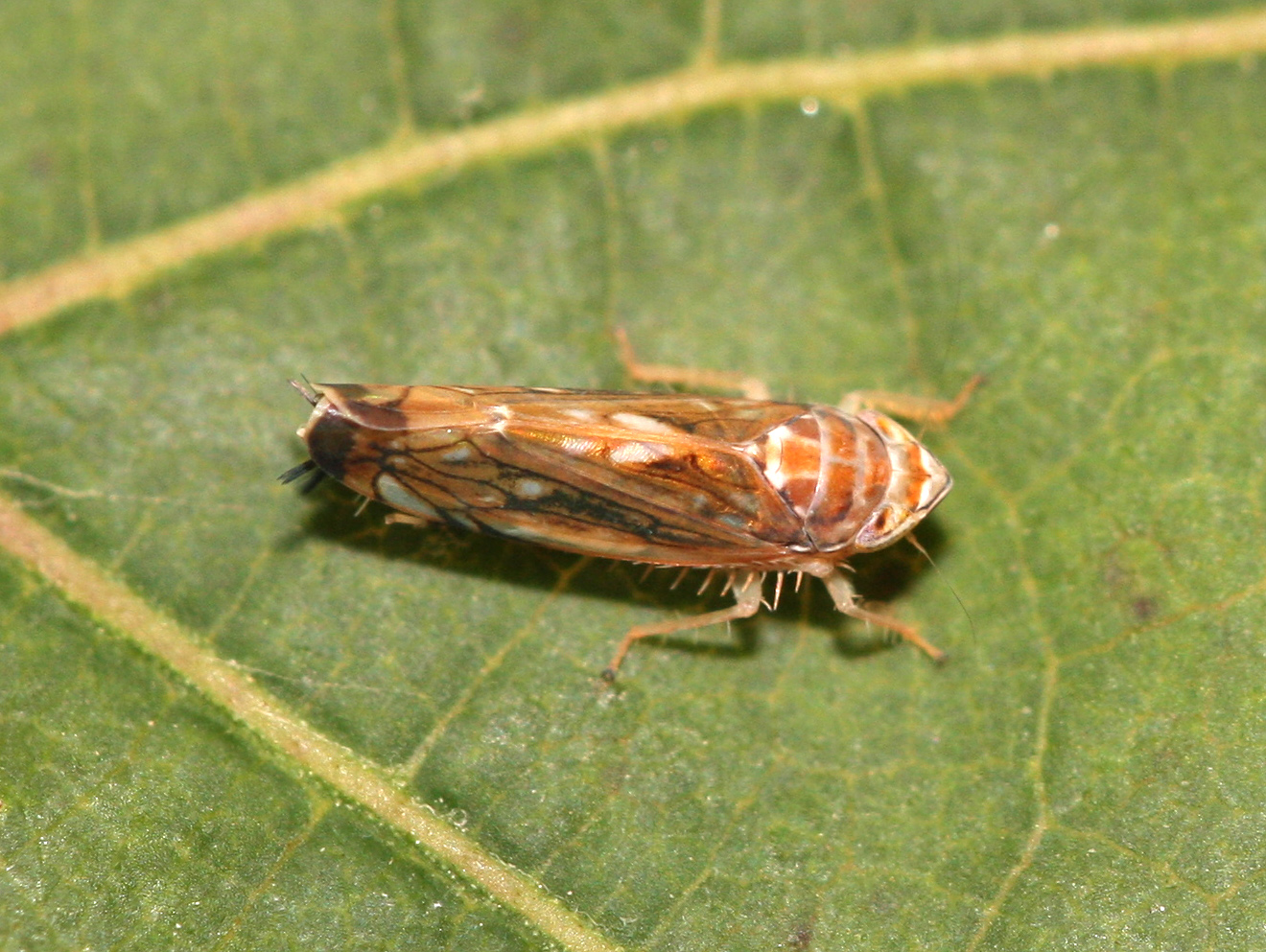
- Female S. titanus on a grapevine leaf

Scientific classification
- Kingdom: Animalia
- Phylum: Arthropoda
- Class: Insecta
- Order: Hemiptera
- Suborder: Auchenorrhyncha
- Family: Cicadellidae
- Genus: Scaphoideus
- Species: S. titanus

Binomial name
- Scaphoideus titanus Ball, 1932

= Scaphoideus titanus =

Species of true bug

Scaphoideus titanus, the American grapevine leafhopper, is an insect of the leafhopper family (Cicadellidae) which feeds on various plants of the family Vitaceae. Native to North America, it was accidentally introduced to Europe where it has become a pest by acting as a vector of the grapevine phytoplasma disease flavescence dorée. Mating requires species-specific vibrational patterns that males emit to the females, which are susceptible to reproductive interference, including vibrational mating disruption caused by humans for pest control purposes. Nymphs do not engage in vibrational communication.
