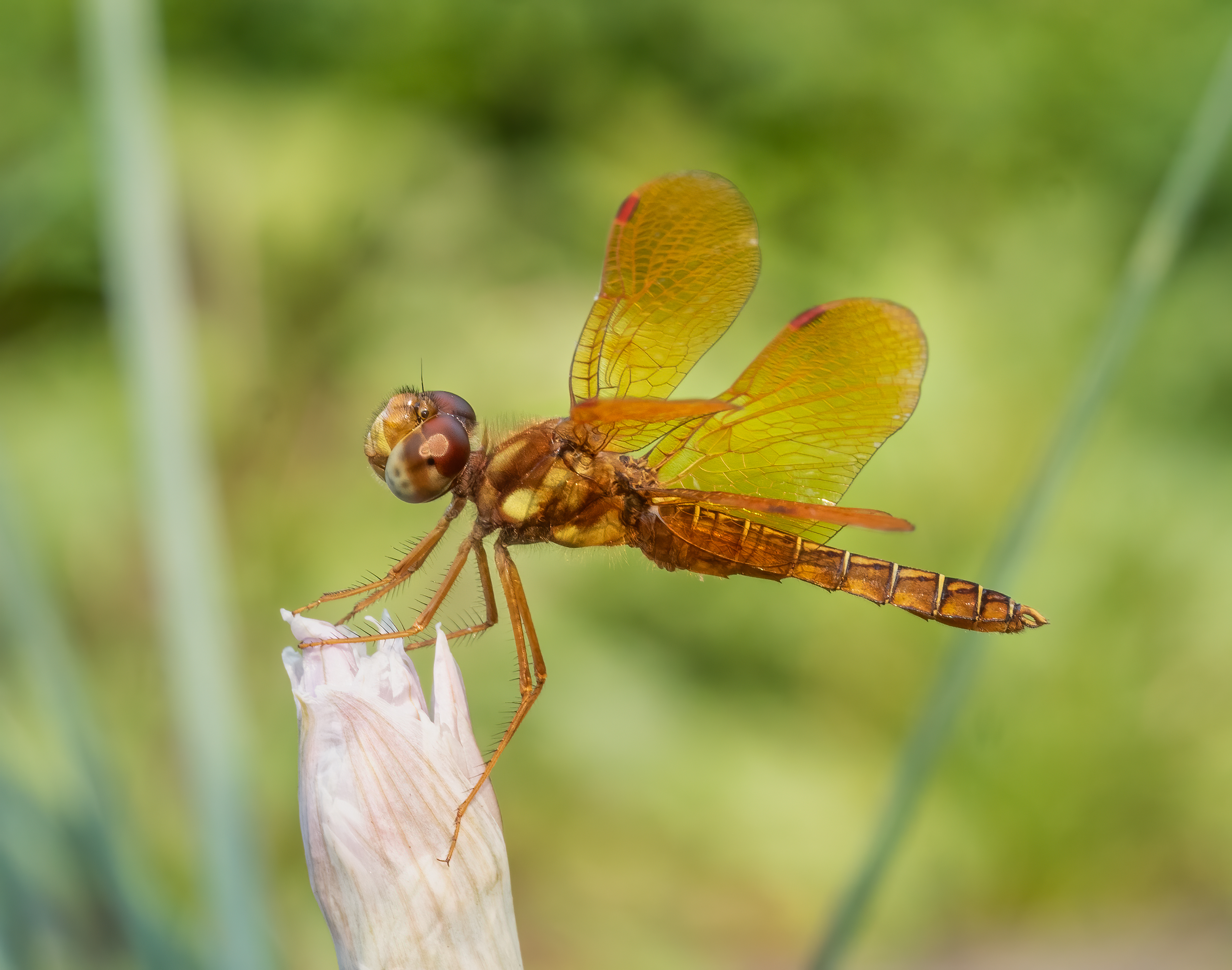
- Male P. tenera (eastern amberwing), New York, USA

Scientific classification
- Kingdom: Animalia
- Phylum: Arthropoda
- Class: Insecta
- Order: Odonata
- Infraorder: Anisoptera
- Family: Libellulidae
- Subfamily: Palpopleurinae
- Genus: Perithemis; Hagen, 1861

= Perithemis =

Amberwings

Genus of dragonflies

Perithemis is a genus of dragonflies commonly known as amberwings. They are characterized by their small size and the amber wings of the male.

Perithemis includes the following species:

- Perithemis bella Kirby, 1889
- Perithemis capixaba Costa, De Souza & Muzón, 2006
- Perithemis cornelia Ris, 1910 - Orange Amberwing
- Perithemis domitia (Drury, 1773) - Slough Amberwing
- Perithemis electra Ris, 1930 - Golden Amberwing
- Perithemis icteroptera (Selys in Sagra, 1857)
- Perithemis intensa Kirby, 1889 - Mexican Amberwing
- Perithemis lais (Perty, 1834) - Fine-banded Amberwing
- Perithemis parzefalli Hoffmann, 1991 - Clear-tipped Amberwing
- Perithemis rubita Dunkle, 1982 - Ruby Amberwing
- Perithemis tenera (Say, 1840) - Eastern Amberwing
- Perithemis thais Kirby, 1889
