= Allonemobius shalontaki =

Scientific classification
- Domain: Eukaryota
- Kingdom: Animalia
- Phylum: Arthropoda
- Class: Insecta
- Order: Orthoptera
- Suborder: Ensifera
- Family: Trigonidiidae
- Genus: Allonemobius
- Species: A. shalontaki

Binomial name
- Allonemobius shalontaki Braswell, Birge & Howard, 2006

Species of cricket

Calling Song

Allonemobius shalontaki, also known as the Choctaw ground cricket, is a species of ground cricket in the subfamily Nemobiinae. It is found in North America. The common name refers to the fact that the cricket was first discovered within the Choctaw Nation, and the species epithet means cricket in the Choctaw language.

A. shalontaki cannot be identified by appearance and can only be recognized by its unique song, which differs greatly from other crickets in its genus. The song is a crescendo consisting of about 50 pulses, in which the final 10 are at peak volume and are slower than the first 40 pulses.
