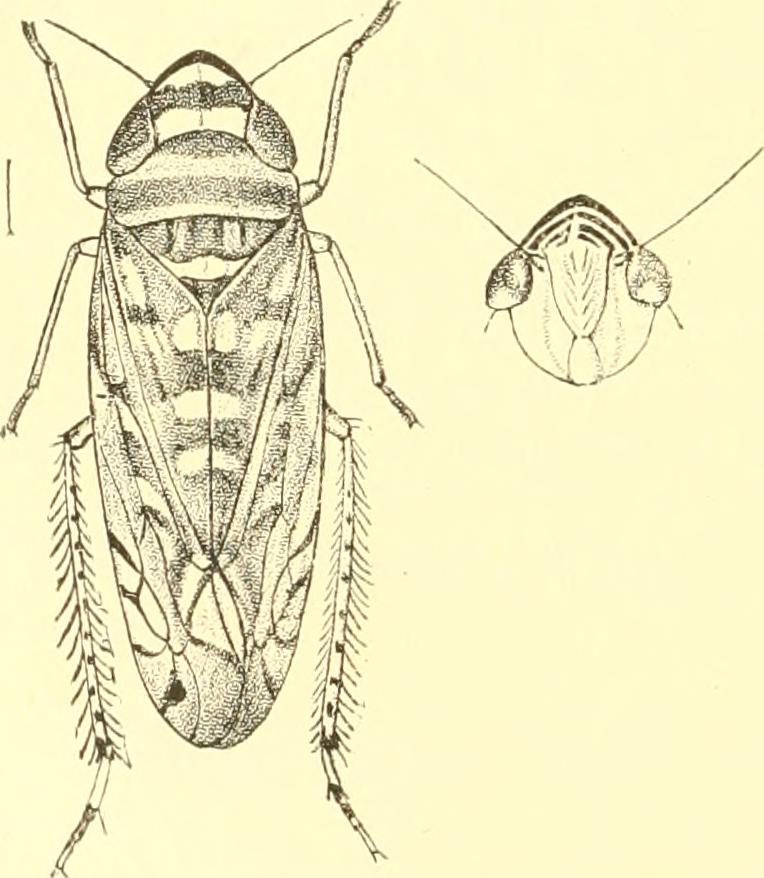

Scientific classification
- Kingdom: Animalia
- Phylum: Arthropoda
- Clade: Pancrustacea
- Class: Insecta
- Order: Hemiptera
- Suborder: Auchenorrhyncha
- Family: Cicadellidae
- Genus: Scaphoideus
- Species: S. festivus

Binomial name
- Scaphoideus festivus Matsumura, 1902

= Scaphoideus festivus =

Species of true bug

Scaphoideus festivus is a species of leafhopper in the family Cicadellidae.
