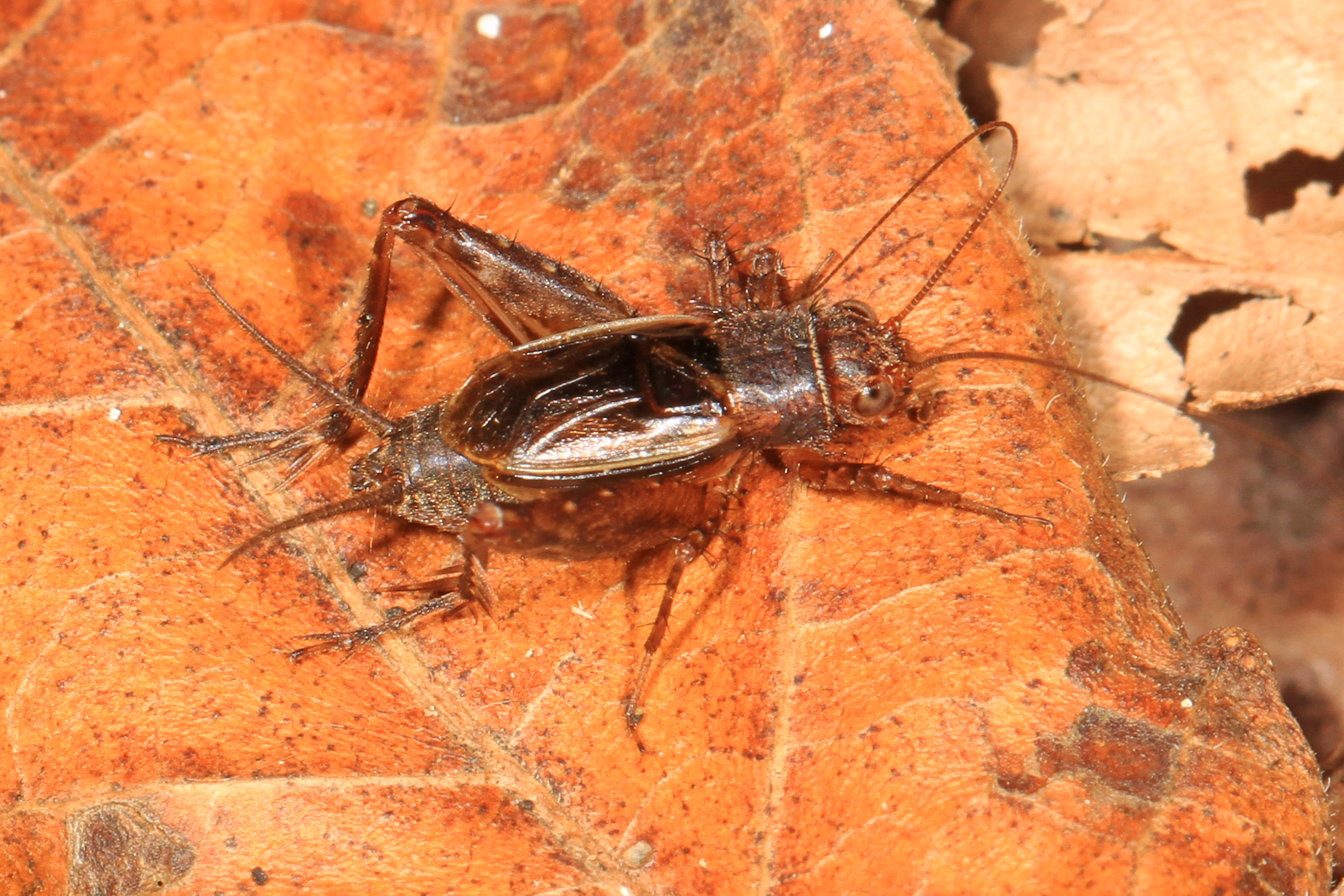

Scientific classification
- Domain: Eukaryota
- Kingdom: Animalia
- Phylum: Arthropoda
- Class: Insecta
- Order: Orthoptera
- Suborder: Ensifera
- Family: Trigonidiidae
- Genus: Allonemobius
- Species: A. tinnulus

Binomial name
- Allonemobius tinnulus (Fulton, 1931)

= Allonemobius tinnulus =

Species of cricket

Allonemobius tinnulus, the tinkling ground cricket, is a species of ground cricket in the family Trigonidiidae. It is found in North America.
