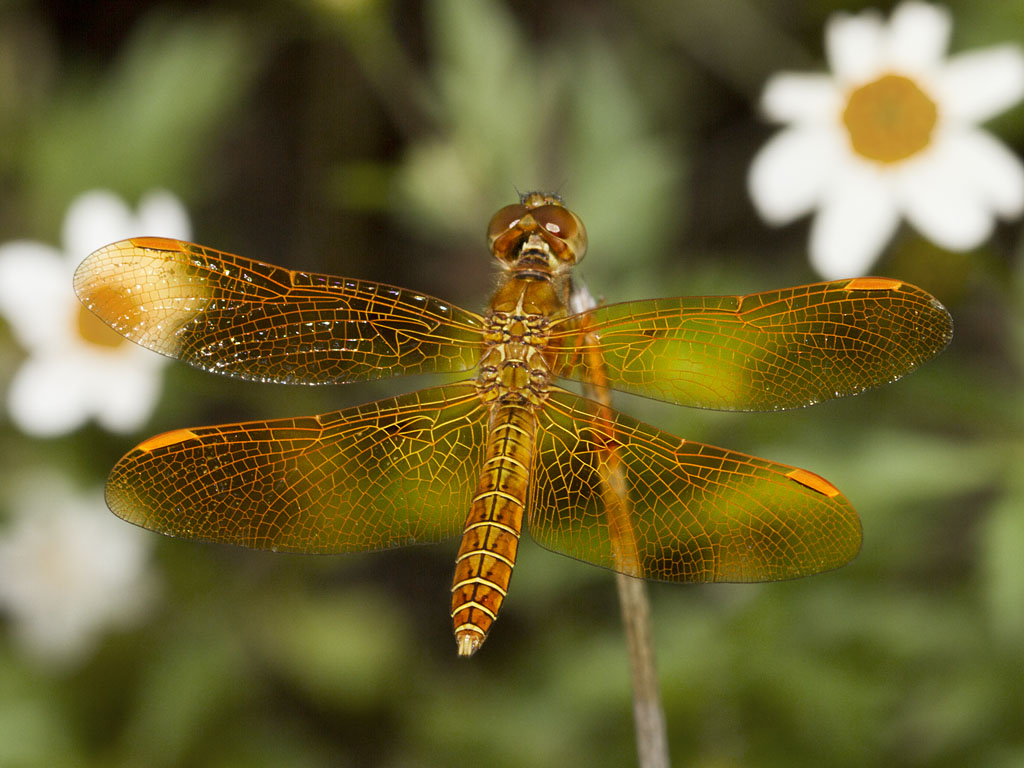

Conservation status
- Least Concern (IUCN 3.1)

Scientific classification
- Kingdom: Animalia
- Phylum: Arthropoda
- Class: Insecta
- Order: Odonata
- Infraorder: Anisoptera
- Family: Libellulidae
- Genus: Perithemis
- Species: P. intensa

Binomial name
- Perithemis intensa W. F. Kirby, 1889

= Mexican amberwing =

Species of dragonfly

The Mexican amberwing (Perithemis intensa) is a dragonfly of the family Libellulidae, native to the southwestern United States and Mexico.
