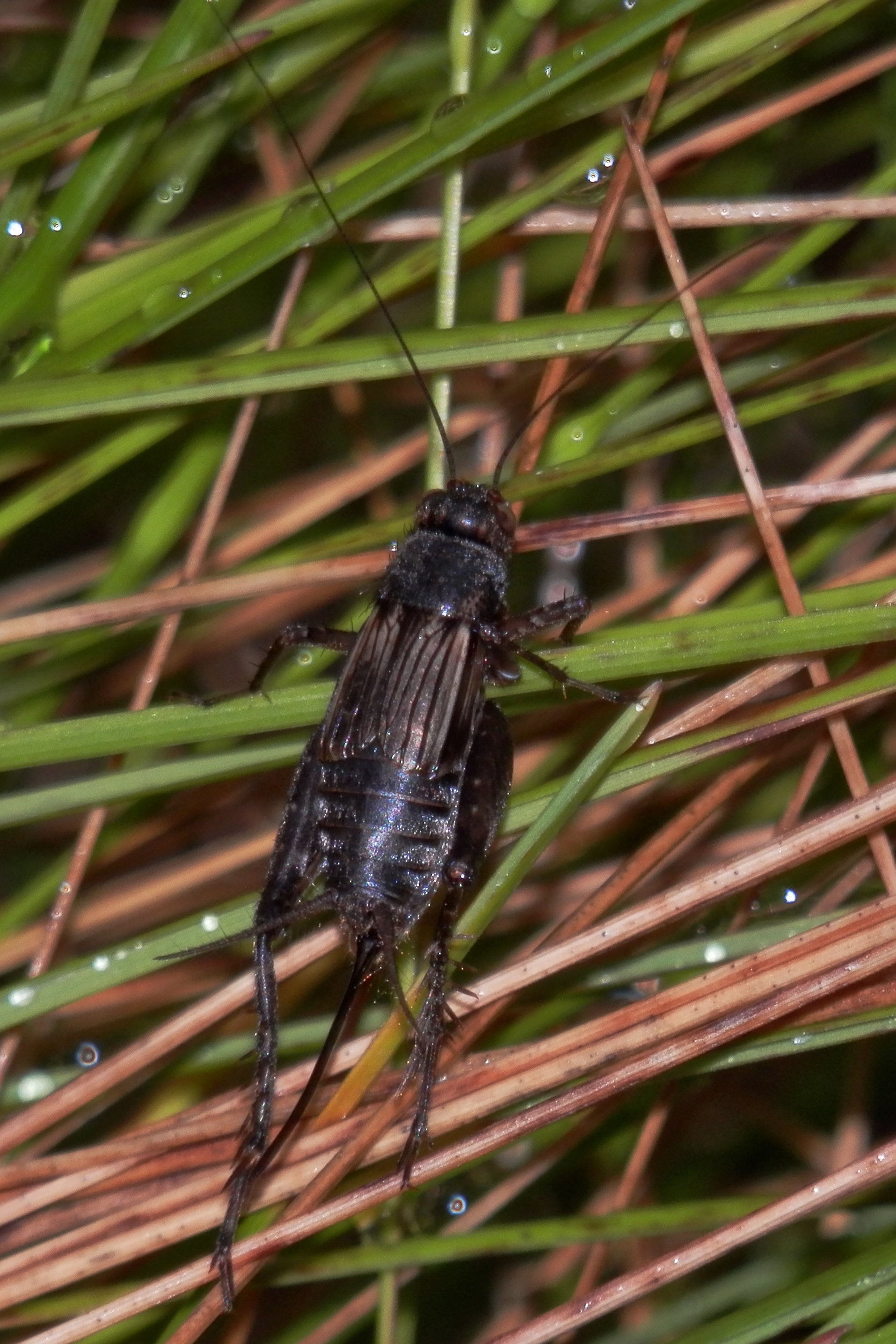

Scientific classification
- Kingdom: Animalia
- Phylum: Arthropoda
- Clade: Pancrustacea
- Class: Insecta
- Order: Orthoptera
- Suborder: Ensifera
- Family: Trigonidiidae
- Genus: Allonemobius
- Species: A. fasciatus

Binomial name
- Allonemobius fasciatus (De Geer, 1773)

Synonyms
- Gryllus fasciatus De Geer, 1773; Nemobius fasciatus (De Geer, 1773)

= Allonemobius fasciatus =

Species of cricket

Allonemobius fasciatus, commonly known as the striped ground cricket, is an omnivorous species of cricket that belongs to the subfamily Nemobiinae. A. fasciatus is studied in depth in evolutionary biology because of the species's ability to hybridize with another Allonemobius species, A. socius.

== Subspecies ==
These two subspecies belong to the species Allonemobius fasciatus:

- Allonemobius fasciatus abortivus (Caudell, 1904)
- Allonemobius fasciatus fasciatus (De Geer, 1773)

== Distribution ==
A. fasciatus is widely distributed in North America, covering eastern and western portions. A. fasciatus typically prefers short grassland habitats. Depending where A. fasciatus resides, traits such a body size can differ. Within North America, there are various hybrid zones, such as in New Jersey, where A. fasciatus has the ability to hybridize with a close relative, A. socius.

A. fasciatus is considered to inhabit northern regions of North America, whereas A. socius inhabits southern regions. In areas where topography can vary, like in mountain regions, A. fasciatus is believed to be found at higher elevations, whereas A. socius is believed to be found in lower elevations. This can be referred to as a mosaic hybrid zone. A mosaic hybrid zone occurs because the habitat ranges for A. fasciatus and A. socius overlap. While it is known that for the most part A. fasciatus remains separated from A. socius when breeding, the potential for interbreeding can occur.

== Behaviour ==
=== Communication ===
Mating calls appear to be related to genotype. Male mating calls amongst A. fasciatus function in interspecific and intraspecific species recognition. Adult male mating calls are influenced in the nymph stage by temperature and length of daylight. Usually, males will avoid moving areas when calling female conspecifics. With the ability for breeding hybridization with A. socius, members of the A. fasciatus species present song calls that are undifferentiated to A. socius by female A. fasciatus. Females have the ability to leave a pheromonal residue on surfaces.

=== Mate selection ===
Females are highly sex-driven and will choose a male to mate with based on the mating call she prefers. When female A. fasciatus hybridizes with A. socius males, she loses very little except the energy expended when looking for the male, and risk associated with potential predation.

== Physiology ==
A. fasciatus wing size is determined by the number of hours of daylight present during development. Most individuals are short-winged and longer daylight periods can account for larger wing size.

== Life cycle ==
A. fasciatus is a univoltine species.

It can take a nymph up to two months to hatch.

This species is photosensitive and development will increase in speed as daylight decreases. This phenomenon is indicative of seasonal synchrony.

== Reproduction ==
=== Hybridization ===
Ground-dwelling crickets only possess XX and XO chromosomes, which allows male individuals to get the X chromosome from the maternal side. The lack of Y chromosome is why hybridization can occur between A. fasciatus and A. socius, because differences in genetics is limited to the X chromosome only.

Females have a high affinity for the sperm that is presented by conspecific males, therefore if mating does occur with a heterospecific male, it rarely results in hybridized offspring. She ultimately has the ability to mate in and outside of her own species, but her eggs will more often than not be fertilized by her conspecific male.

=== Oviposition ===
A. fasciatus produces one brood in a season. In the later part of the summer, A. fasciatus deposits its embryos into the ground through a reproductive structure called the ovipositor. Ovipositor length in A. fasciatus varies depending on the geographical location it is found. When A. fasciatus deposits her diapause egg in the ground, the depth at which the egg is deposited depends on the length of the ovipositor. As diapause relies on temperature, it is possible that in high temperatures, eggs of A. fasciatus can exit or avoid the diapause phase, however this is not common. Between the two sister species, at a temperature given of 30 degrees Celsius, A. fasciatus develops quicker than A. socius.

A. fasciatus undergoes a process called bet hedging that is likely due to temperature and changes in moisture found in the soil where eggs are positioned.
