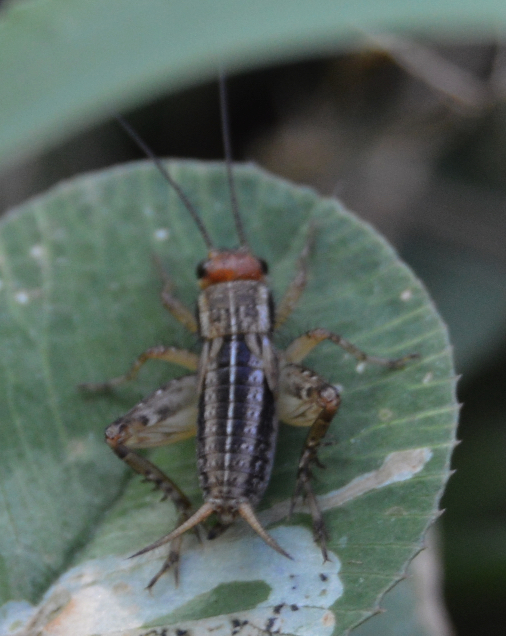
- Allonemobius sp. nymph on clover

Scientific classification
- Domain: Eukaryota
- Kingdom: Animalia
- Phylum: Arthropoda
- Class: Insecta
- Order: Orthoptera
- Suborder: Ensifera
- Family: Trigonidiidae
- Subfamily: Nemobiinae
- Tribe: Pteronemobiini
- Genus: Allonemobius; Hebard, 1913

= Allonemobius =

Genus of crickets

Allonemobius is a genus of North American crickets: insects in the family Gryllidae. They are part of the subfamily Nemobiinae, also known as "ground crickets."

== Taxonomy ==
The Orthoptera Species File database lists the following species:

- Allonemobius allardi (Alexander & Thomas, 1959)
- Allonemobius fasciatus (De Geer, 1773)
- Allonemobius fultoni Howard & Furth, 1986
- Allonemobius griseus (Walker, 1904)
- Allonemobius maculatus (Blatchley, 1900)
- Allonemobius shalontaki Braswell, Birge & Howard, 2006
- Allonemobius socius (Scudder, 1877)
- Allonemobius sparsalsus (Fulton, 1930)
- Allonemobius tinnulus (Fulton, 1931)
- Allonemobius walkeri Howard & Furth, 1986
