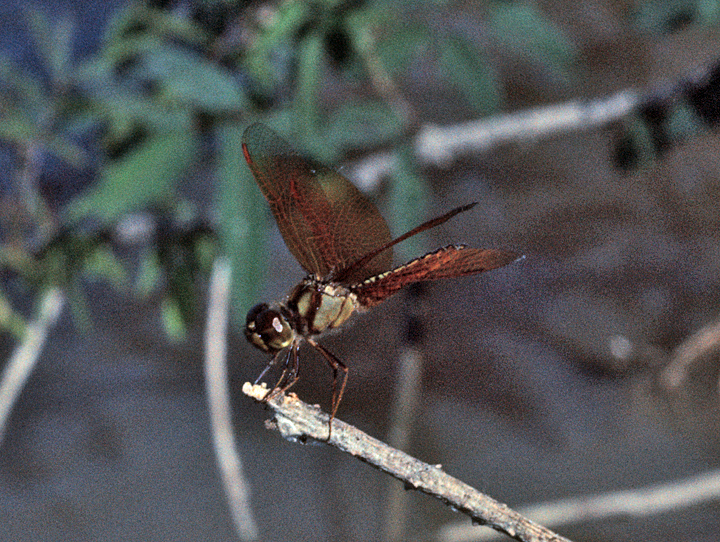

Conservation status
- Least Concern (IUCN 3.1)

Scientific classification
- Kingdom: Animalia
- Phylum: Arthropoda
- Clade: Pancrustacea
- Class: Insecta
- Order: Odonata
- Suborder: Anisoptera
- Superfamily: Libelluloidea
- Family: Libellulidae
- Genus: Perithemis
- Species: P. bella

Binomial name
- Perithemis bella Kirby, 1889

Synonyms
- Perithemis austeni Kirby, 1897

= Perithemis bella =

Species of dragonfly

Perithemis bella is a species of dragonfly in the Libellulidae family. It can be found in South America.

== Taxonomy ==
Perithemis bella was first formally described by William Forsell Kirby in 1889. In a 1930 revision of the genus by Friedrich Ris, P. austeni was synonymized to the species.

== Description ==
Both males and females have a brown body and a thorax with a central reddish stripe.

=== Males ===
Males have a 14 mm (0.55 in) long abdomen, a 17 by 7 mm (0.67 by 0.28 in) hind wing, and a 1.5–2 mm (0.059–0.079 in) pterostigma. The face, pleura and the sides of the base of the abdomen of males are yellowish. The abdomen is broadest of all males of the genus Perithemis, and slightly fusiform. The fore wings are transparent, and deeply yellow at the base. The hind wings are completely yellow. All wings have a rust-colored pterostigma.

=== Females ===
Females have a 13 mm (0.51 in) long abdomen, a 17 by 6.5 mm (0.67 by 0.26 in) hind wing, and a 2.5 mm (0.098 in) pterostigma. The face, pleura, and the base of the abdomen of females are dull white. The abdomen is very fusiform, the most of all Perithemis. The fore wings are transparent with a yellow antenodal space that has brown spots. The hind wings have a spot in the center that may be yellow, yellow with a blackish center, or black with a yellow border. The wings have a dull brown pterostigma and blackish costa.

== Distribution ==
Perithemis bella can be found in Peru, Ecuador, Colombia, and Brazil. It occurs at elevations of 40–300 meters (130–980 ft).
