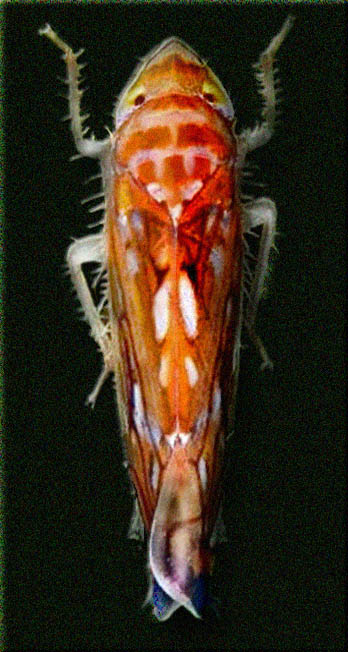
- Scaphoideus titanus, the vector of the grapevine phytoplasma disease flavescence dorée

Scientific classification
- Domain: Eukaryota
- Kingdom: Animalia
- Phylum: Arthropoda
- Class: Insecta
- Order: Hemiptera
- Suborder: Auchenorrhyncha
- Family: Cicadellidae
- Subfamily: Deltocephalinae
- Tribe: Scaphoideini
- Genus: Scaphoideus; Uhler, 1889

Species
- See text

= Scaphoideus =

Genus of true bugs

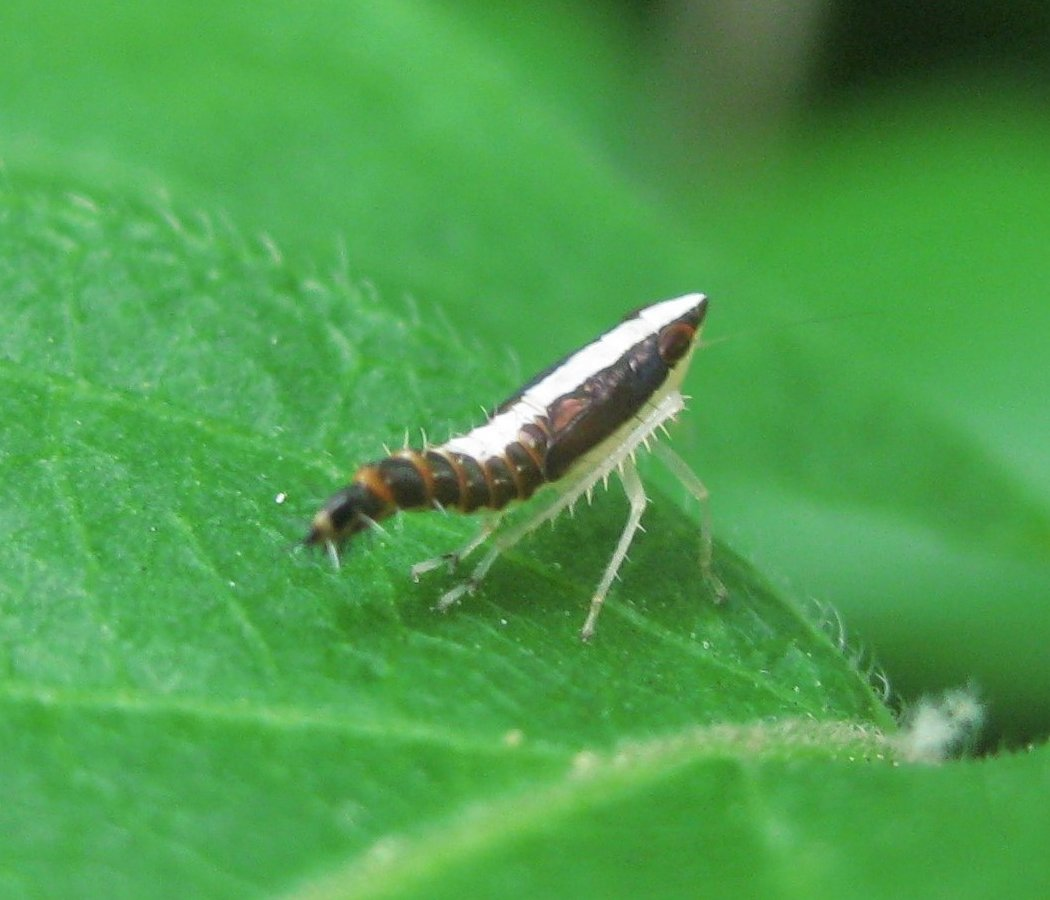
Scaphoideus nymph

Scaphoideus is a genus of leafhoppers in the subfamily Deltocephalinae.

== Economic importance ==
Species in the genus are plant pathogens vectors. For instance, the elm yellows is transmitted from infected to healthy trees by the whitebanded elm leafhopper (Scaphoideus luteolus), whereas Scaphoideus titanus is the vector of the grapevine phytoplasma disease flavescence dorée.

== Species ==
- Scaphoideus abitus
- Scaphoideus acanthus
- Scaphoideus accumulator
- Scaphoideus alboguttatus
- Scaphoideus albomaculatus
- Scaphoideus albosignatus
- Scaphoideus albovittatus
- Scaphoideus alticola
- Scaphoideus anguis
- Scaphoideus angustatus
- Scaphoideus apicalis
- Scaphoideus assamensis
- Scaphoideus asymmetricus
- Scaphoideus atlantus
- Scaphoideus aurantiacus
- Scaphoideus baeticus
- Scaphoideus bicoloratus
- Scaphoideus bifidus
- Scaphoideus bifurcatus
- Scaphoideus bihamatus
- Scaphoideus bimaculatus
- Scaphoideus bipedis
- Scaphoideus biprocessus
- Scaphoideus blennus
- Scaphoideus callus
- Scaphoideus camurus
- Scaphoideus carinatus
- Scaphoideus chelatus
- Scaphoideus cinerosus
- Scaphoideus coloratus
- Scaphoideus conicaplateus
- Scaphoideus consanguineus
- Scaphoideus coronatus
- Scaphoideus crassus
- Scaphoideus curvanus
- Scaphoideus curvatureus
- Scaphoideus curvatus
- Scaphoideus cylindratus
- Scaphoideus cyprius
- Scaphoideus decoratus
- Scaphoideus dellagiustinai
- Scaphoideus densus
- Scaphoideus dentaedeagus
- Scaphoideus dentatestyleus
- Scaphoideus diminutus
- Scaphoideus elegantalus
- Scaphoideus elongatus
- Scaphoideus erythraeous
- Scaphoideus exsertus
- Scaphoideus fanjingensis
- Scaphoideus festivus
- Scaphoideus flavidus
- Scaphoideus fletcheri
- Scaphoideus forceps
- Scaphoideus foshoi
- Scaphoideus frisoni
- Scaphoideus fuscus
- Scaphoideus galachrous
- Scaphoideus geniculatus
- Scaphoideus graciliplateus
- Scaphoideus guizhouensis
- Scaphoideus harlani
- Scaphoideus harpagous
- Scaphoideus hirsutus
- Scaphoideus hongdoensis
- Scaphoideus illustris
- Scaphoideus immistus
- Scaphoideus incisus
- Scaphoideus incognitus
- Scaphoideus inequalis
- Scaphoideus insignis
- Scaphoideus intermedius
- Scaphoideus intricatus
- Scaphoideus inundatus
- Scaphoideus jannus
- Scaphoideus jogensis
- Scaphoideus karachiensis
- Scaphoideus katraini
- Scaphoideus kirti
- Scaphoideus knappi
- Scaphoideus kotoshonis
- Scaphoideus kumamotonis
- Scaphoideus lacyi
- Scaphoideus lamellaris
- Scaphoideus literatus
- Scaphoideus littoralis
- Scaphoideus liui
- Scaphoideus longistyleus
- Scaphoideus lophus
- Scaphoideus luteolus Van Duzee
- Scaphoideus maai
- Scaphoideus major
- Scaphoideus malaisei
- Scaphoideus mandevillei
- Scaphoideus matsumurai
- Scaphoideus melanotus
- Scaphoideus menius
- Scaphoideus merus
- Scaphoideus midvittatus
- Scaphoideus minor
- Scaphoideus morosus
- Scaphoideus morrisoni
- Scaphoideus multangulus
- Scaphoideus nigricans
- Scaphoideus nigrifacies
- Scaphoideus nigrisignus
- Scaphoideus nigrivalveus
- Scaphoideus nitobei
- Scaphoideus notatus
- Scaphoideus obscurus
- Scaphoideus obtusus
- Scaphoideus ochraceus
- Scaphoideus opalinus
- Scaphoideus orientalis
- Scaphoideus ornatus
- Scaphoideus palingus
- Scaphoideus pallidiventris
- Scaphoideus paludosus
- Scaphoideus pars
- Scaphoideus pristidens
- Scaphoideus procerus
- Scaphoideus pullus
- Scaphoideus punctulatus
- Scaphoideus quangtriensis
- Scaphoideus rathini
- Scaphoideus relatus
- Scaphoideus rubranotum
- Scaphoideus rubroguttatus
- Scaphoideus rufomaculatus
- Scaphoideus russus
- Scaphoideus sabourensis
- Scaphoideus sculptellus
- Scaphoideus sculptus
- Scaphoideus sensibilis
- Scaphoideus seychellensis
- Scaphoideus shovelaedeagus
- Scaphoideus soleus
- Scaphoideus spiculatus
- Scaphoideus spiniplateus
- Scaphoideus spinulosus
- Scaphoideus stigmaticus
- Scaphoideus strigulatus
- Scaphoideus tergatus
- Scaphoideus testaceous
- Scaphoideus thailandensis
- Scaphoideus titanus Ball, 1932
- Scaphoideus torqus
- Scaphoideus transeus
- Scaphoideus transvittatus
- Scaphoideus trilobatus
- Scaphoideus trimaculatus
- Scaphoideus triunatus
- Scaphoideus turbinatus
- Scaphoideus umbrinus
- Scaphoideus undulatus
- Scaphoideus unimaculatus
- Scaphoideus unipunctatus
- Scaphoideus vagans
- Scaphoideus varius
- Scaphoideus varna
- Scaphoideus vaticus
- Scaphoideus veterator
- Scaphoideus vittatus
- Scaphoideus widesternanus
- Scaphoideus yingjiangensis
- Scaphoideus zangi
- Scaphoideus zhangi
