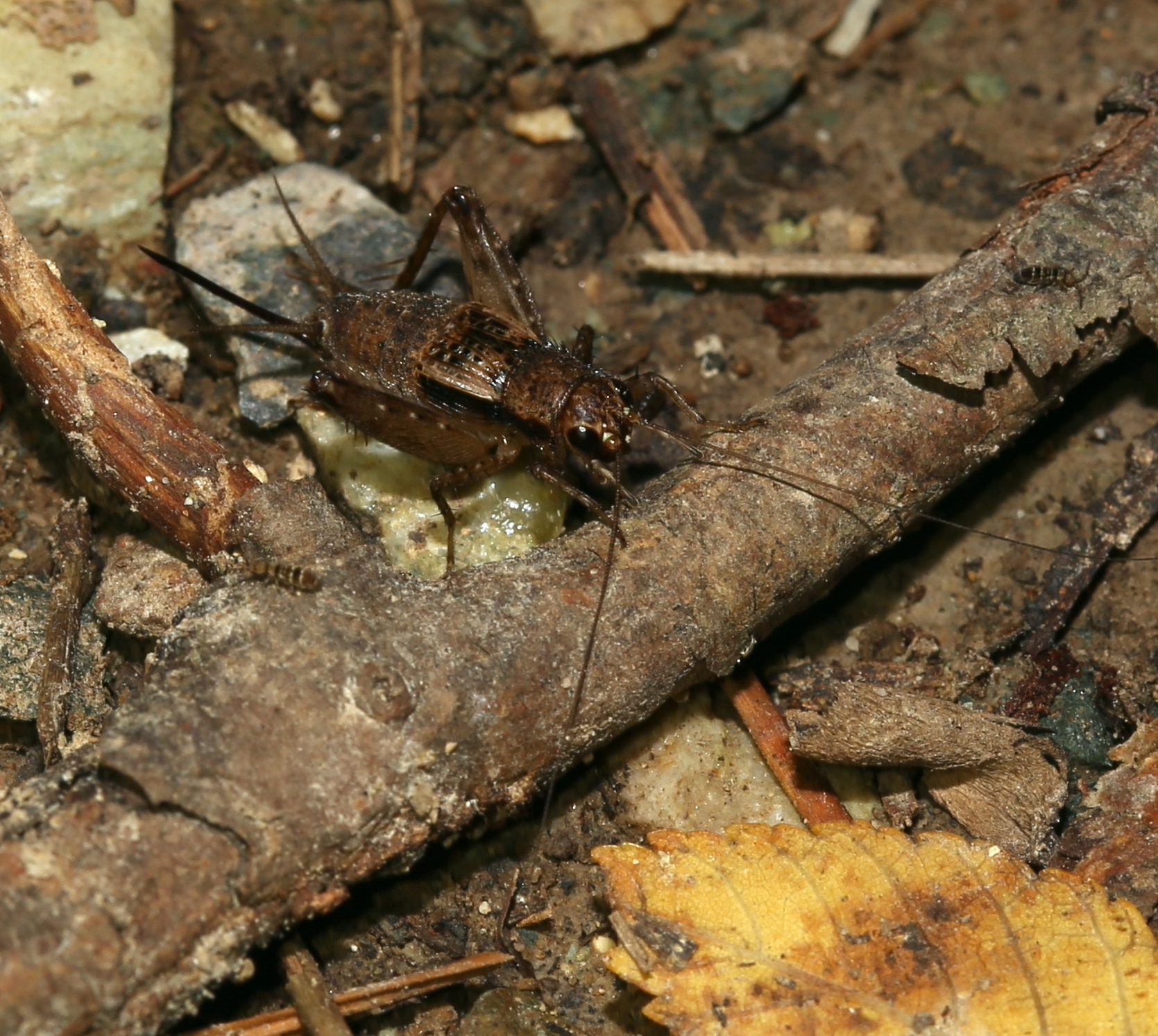

Scientific classification
- Kingdom: Animalia
- Phylum: Arthropoda
- Class: Insecta
- Order: Orthoptera
- Suborder: Ensifera
- Family: Trigonidiidae
- Genus: Allonemobius
- Species: A. maculatus

Binomial name
- Allonemobius maculatus (Blatchley, 1900)

Synonyms
- Nemobius maculatus Blatchley, 1900

= Allonemobius maculatus =

Species of cricket

Allonemobius maculatus, known generally as the spotted ground cricket or larger spotted ground cricket, is a species of ground cricket in the family Gryllidae. It is found in North America.
