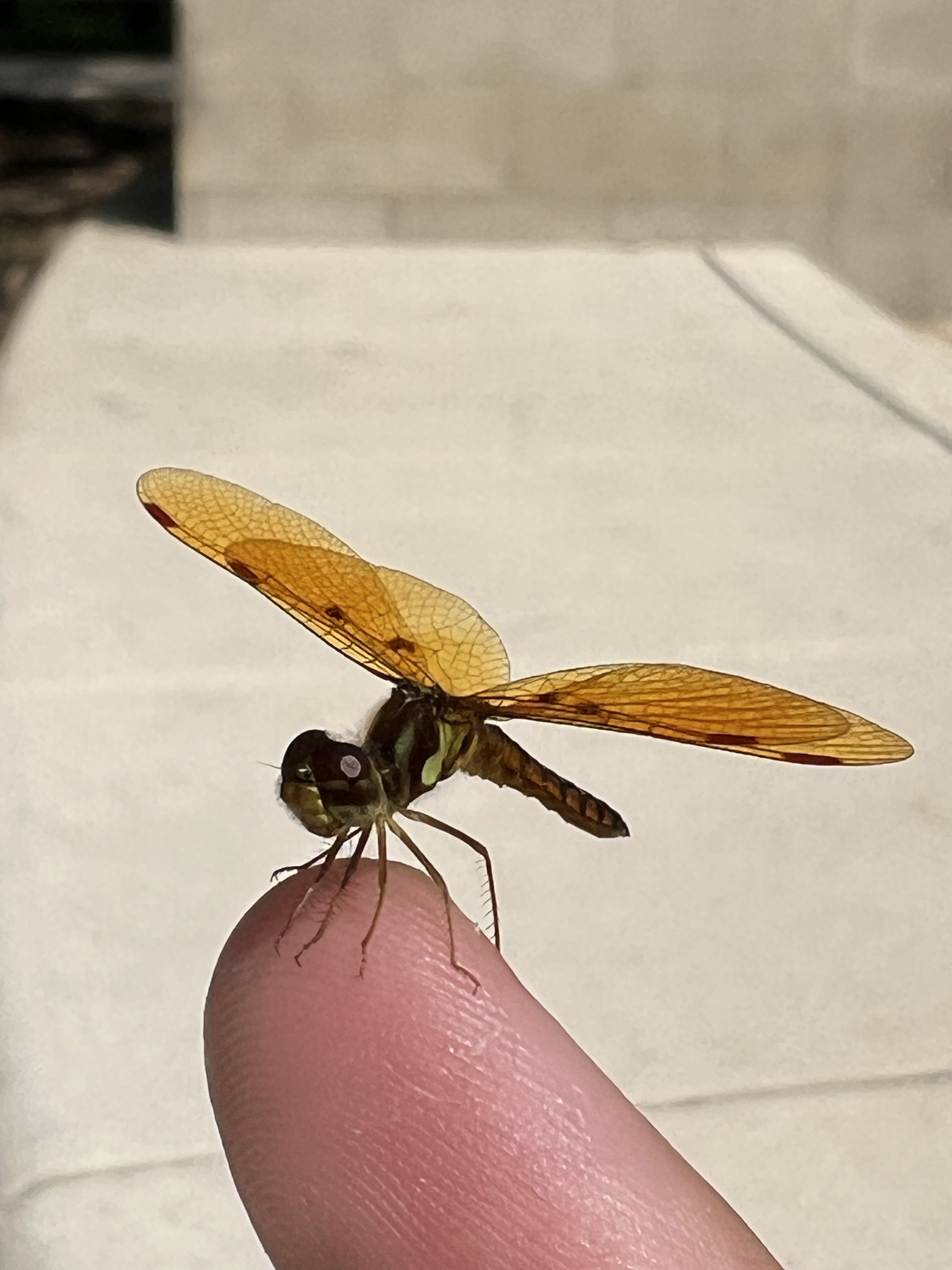
- Male
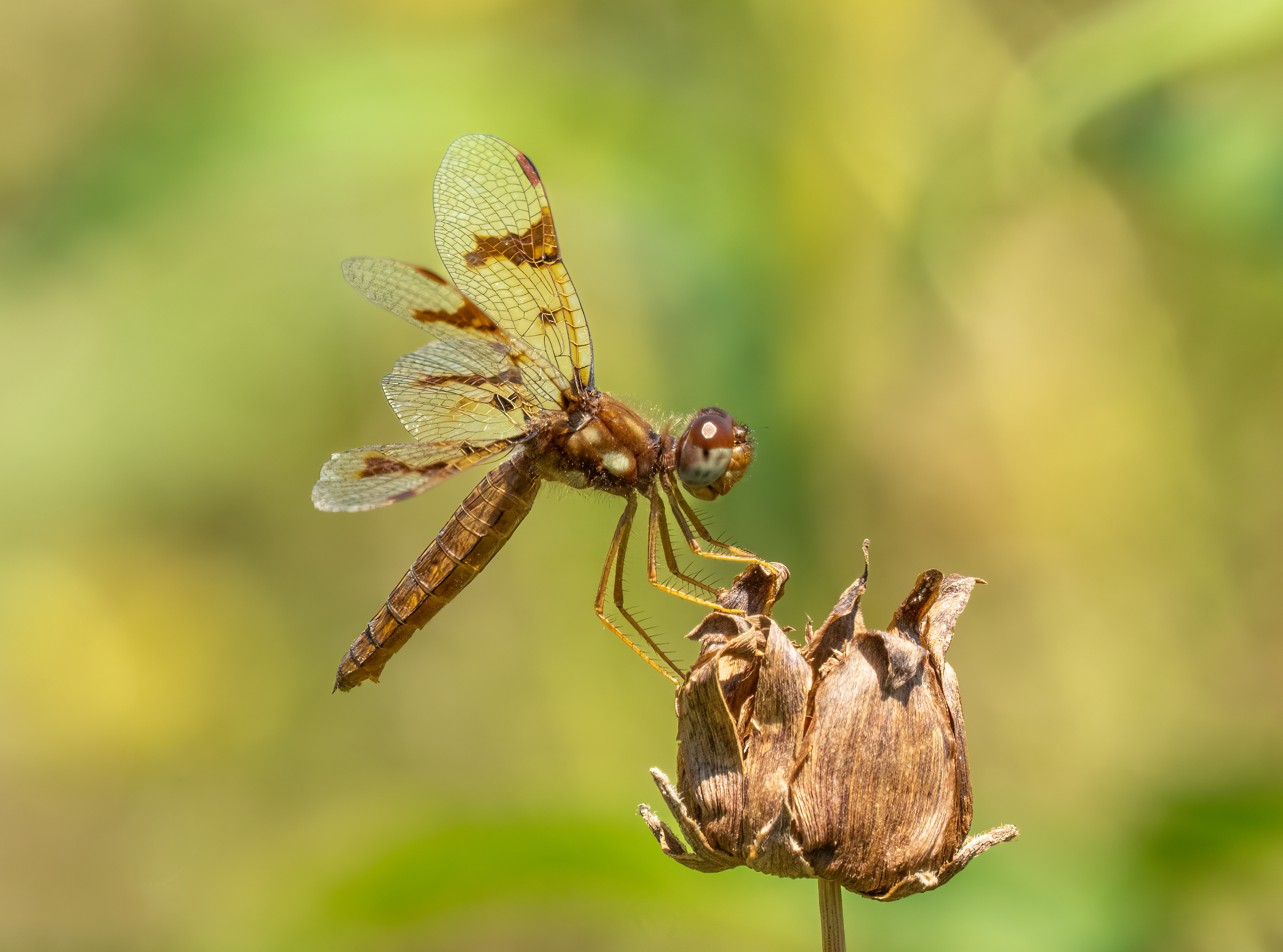
- Female

Conservation status
- Least Concern (IUCN 3.1)

- Secure (NatureServe)

Scientific classification
- Kingdom: Animalia
- Phylum: Arthropoda
- Clade: Pancrustacea
- Class: Insecta
- Order: Odonata
- Infraorder: Anisoptera
- Family: Libellulidae
- Genus: Perithemis
- Species: P. tenera

Binomial name
- Perithemis tenera (Say, 1840)
- Range of P. tenera

Synonyms
- List: Libellula tenuicincta Say, 1840; Libellula chlora Rambur, 1842; Perithemis cloe Hagen, 1861 (nomen nudum); Perithemis mooma Kirby, 1889; Perithemis domitia seminole Calvert, 1907; Perithemis mooma octoxantha Ris, 1910; Perithemis piperi Hoffmann, 1987

= Eastern amberwing =

Species of dragonfly

The eastern amberwing (Perithemis tenera) is a species of dragonfly in the family Libellulidae. It is very small, reaching a total length of no more than 25 millimetres (0.98 in). The males have orange or amber wings, which likely contain pheomelanin. Both sexes have a red pterostigma. It is found in eastern North America, from northern Mexico north to south-eastern Canada.

The eastern amberwing dragonfly is one of the only types of dragonfly that actively mimics a wasp. The yellow and brown stripes on its abdomen encourage predators to stay away. When perched, they wiggle their abdomen and wings in a wasp-like fashion to deter other animals from eating it. Males have an elaborate courtship ritual. When a female approaches his territory, the male will lead her to his selected egg-laying site and hover above it with wings whirring and abdomen raised.

The common name refers to its eastern range, although this dragonfly does extend westward well into the central part of the United States. The scientific name, tenera, means delicate and alludes to its small size.

== Gallery ==
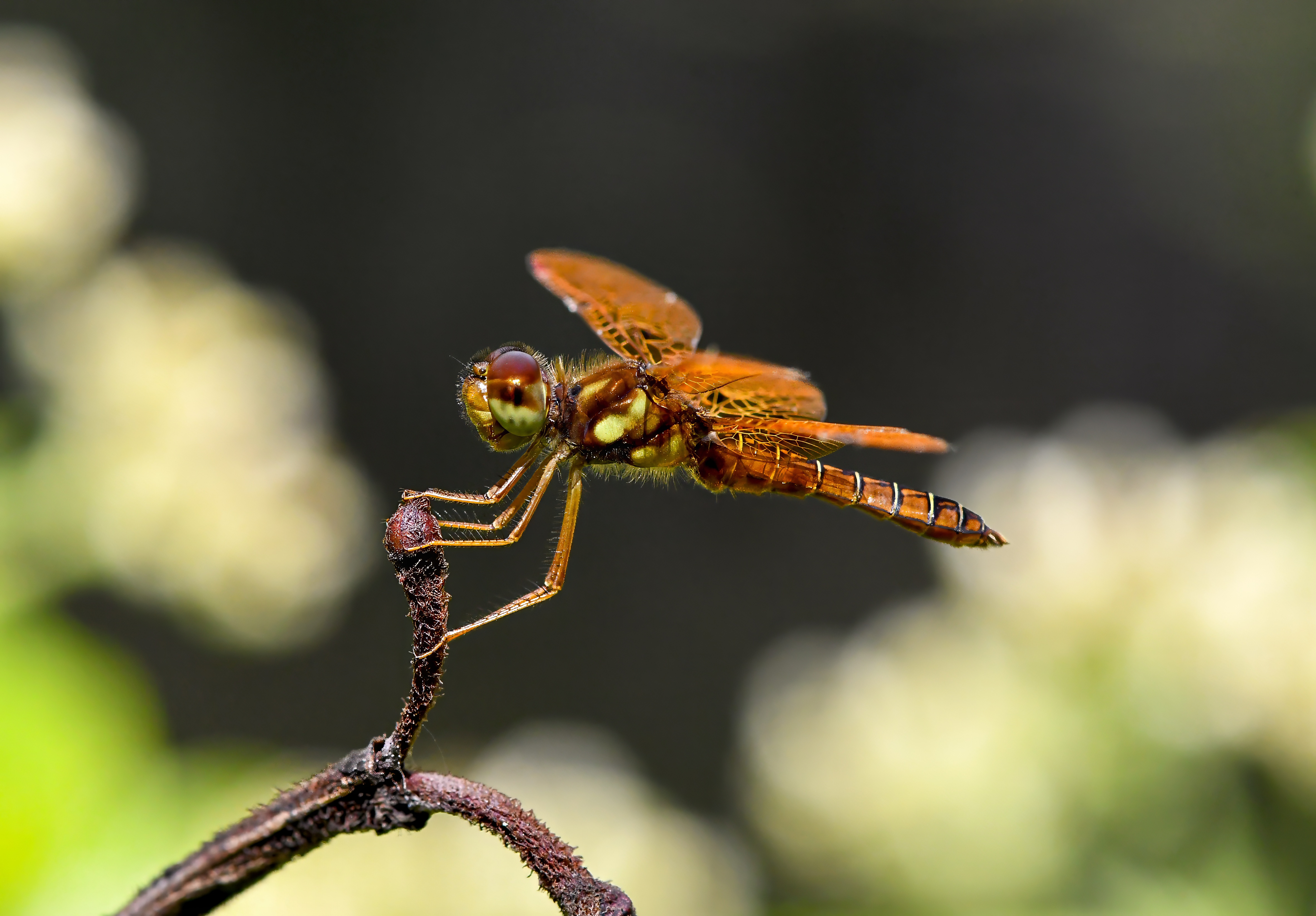
Male
Lake Wales, Florida, US

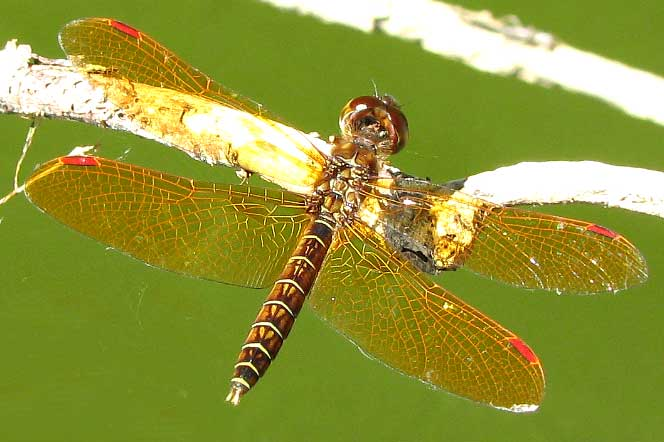
Male

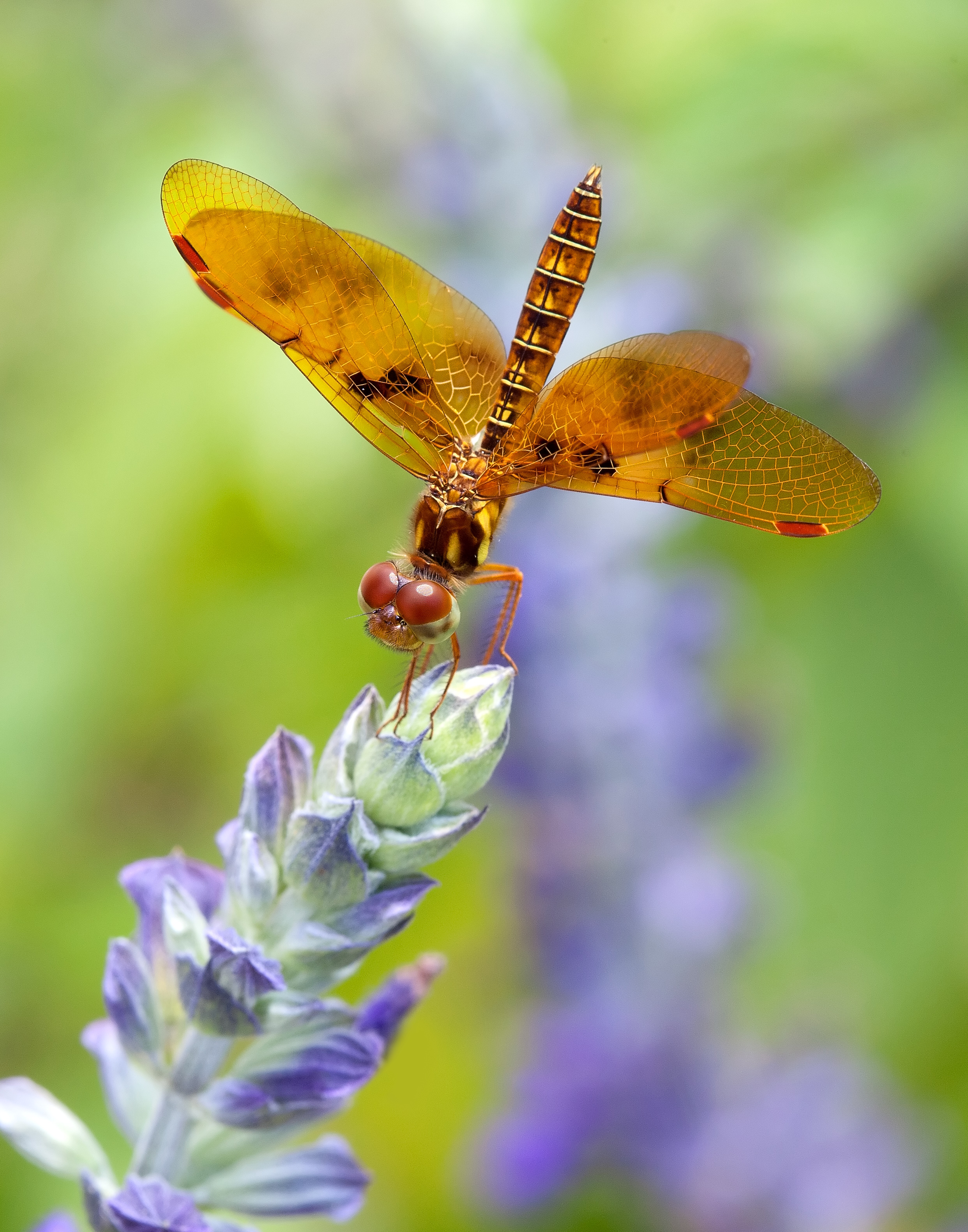
Male

Ovipositing Naperville, Illinois, US
