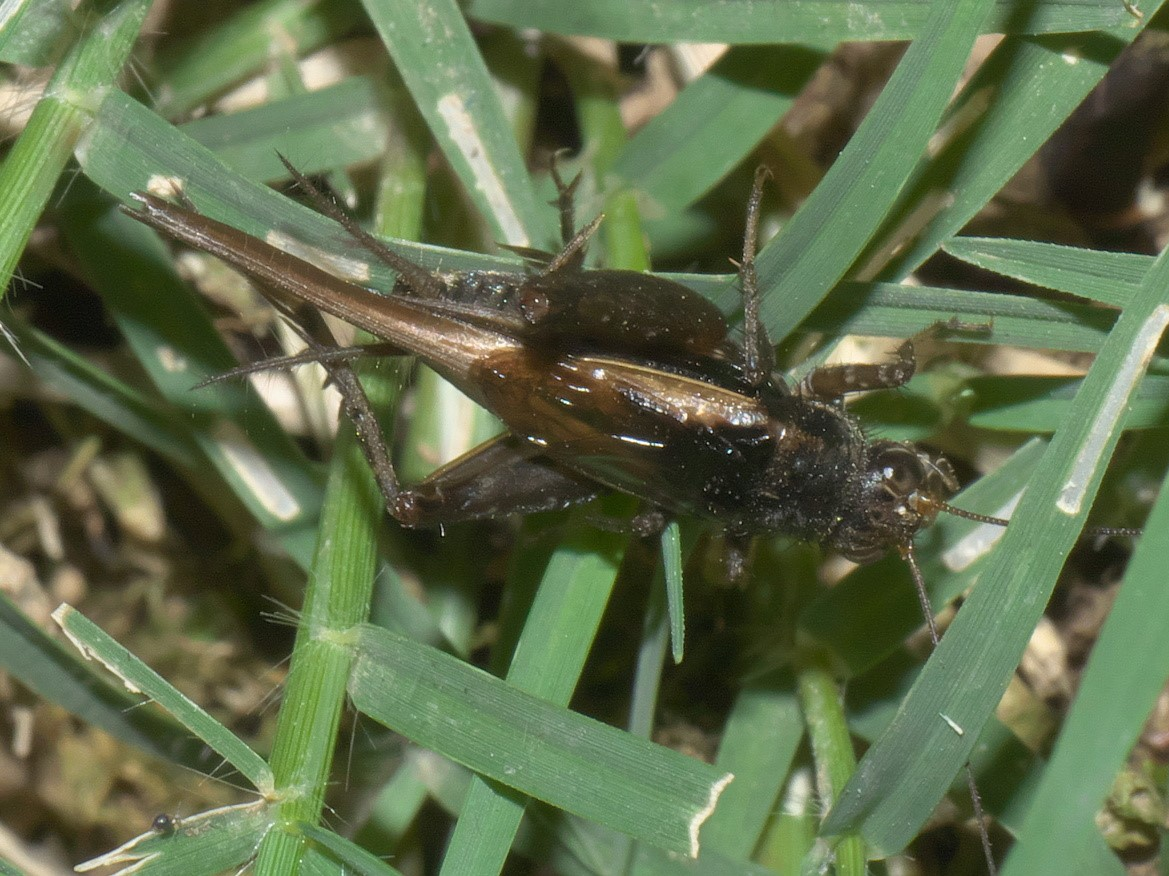

Scientific classification
- Domain: Eukaryota
- Kingdom: Animalia
- Phylum: Arthropoda
- Class: Insecta
- Order: Orthoptera
- Suborder: Ensifera
- Family: Trigonidiidae
- Tribe: Pteronemobiini
- Genus: Allonemobius
- Species: A. socius

Binomial name
- Allonemobius socius (Scudder, 1877)

= Allonemobius socius =

Species of cricket

Allonemobius socius, the southern ground cricket, is a species of ground cricket in the family Trigonidiidae. It is found in North America.
