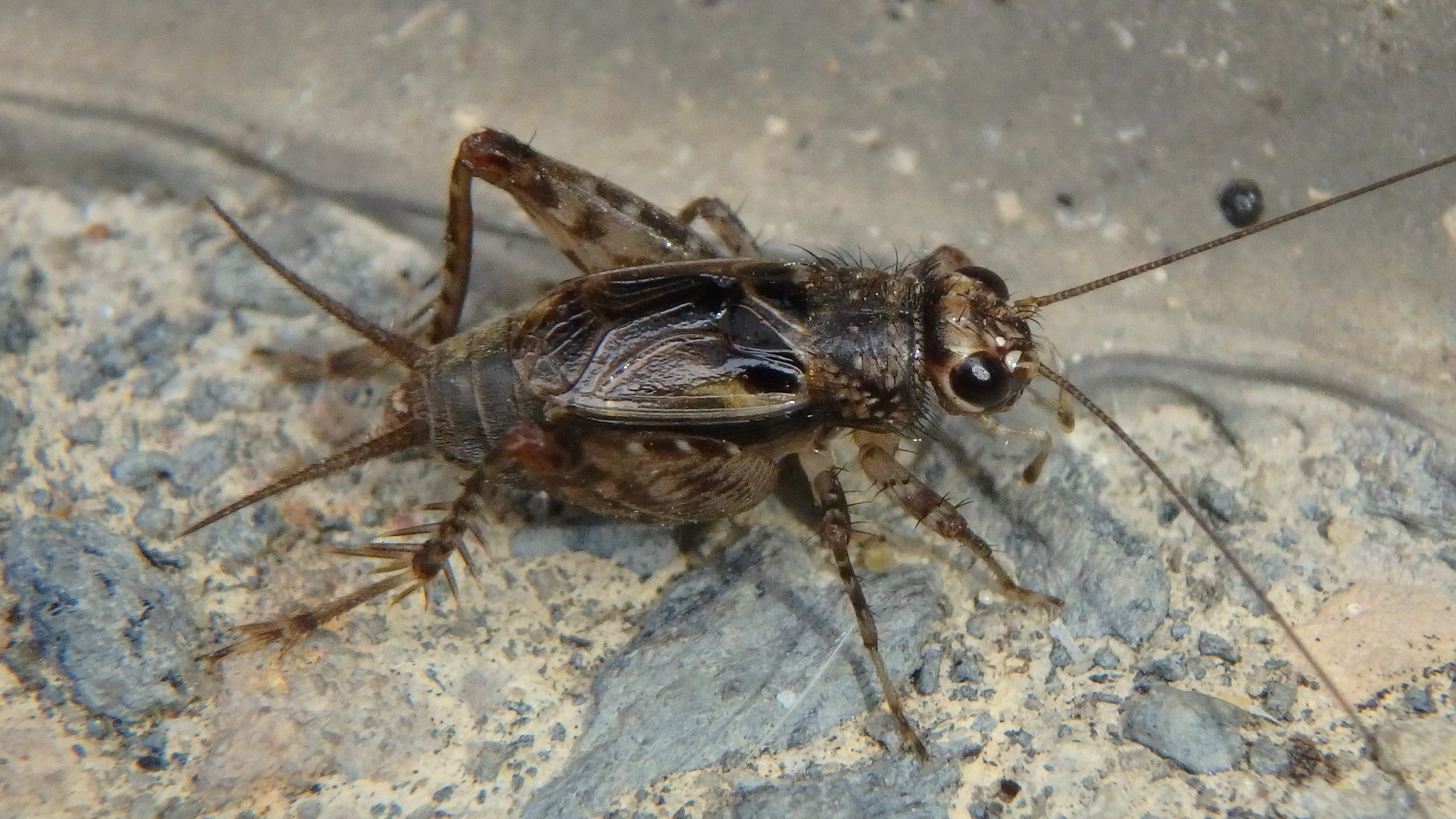

Scientific classification
- Domain: Eukaryota
- Kingdom: Animalia
- Phylum: Arthropoda
- Class: Insecta
- Order: Orthoptera
- Suborder: Ensifera
- Family: Trigonidiidae
- Tribe: Pteronemobiini
- Genus: Neonemobius
- Species: N. variegatus

Binomial name
- Neonemobius variegatus (Bruner, 1893)

= Neonemobius variegatus =

Species of cricket

Neonemobius variegatus, known generally as the variegated ground cricket or smaller spotted ground cricket, is a species of ground cricket in the family Trigonidiidae. It is found in North America.
