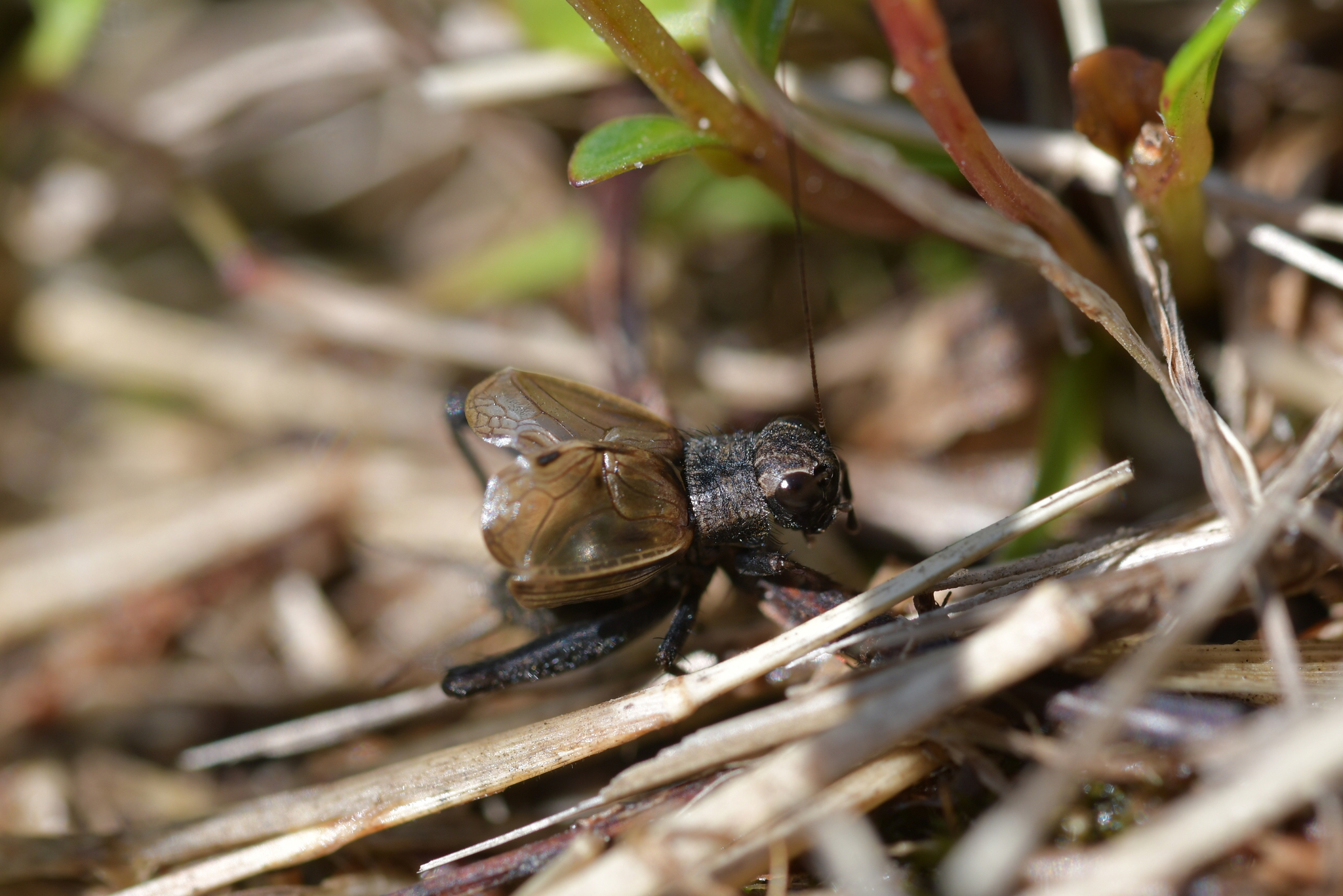

Scientific classification
- Domain: Eukaryota
- Kingdom: Animalia
- Phylum: Arthropoda
- Class: Insecta
- Order: Orthoptera
- Suborder: Ensifera
- Family: Trigonidiidae
- Subfamily: Nemobiinae
- Tribe: Nemobiini
- Genus: Bobilla; Otte & Alexander, 1983

= Bobilla =

Genus of crickets

Bobilla is a genus of cricket in tribe Nemobiini, found in Australasia and the Pacific islands. These small black crickets sing using their wings and stridulatory files. Two species native to New Zealand (Bobilla nigrova and B. bigelowi) are sympatric but can be differentiated by their song and the colour of their eggs.

== Taxonomy ==
The Orthoptera Species File database lists the following species groups and species:

- Bobilla bivittata (Walker, 1869) - type species (as Nemobius bivittatus Walker, F)
  - Bobilla bakali Otte & Alexander, 1983
  - Bobilla bivittata (Walker, 1869)
  - Bobilla kindyerra Otte & Alexander, 1983
  - Bobilla neobivittata Otte & Alexander, 1983
  - Bobilla poene Otte & Alexander, 1983
  - Bobilla tasmani Otte & Alexander, 1983
  - Bobilla victoriae Otte & Alexander, 1983
- Bobilla plurampe Otte & Alexander, 1983
  - Bobilla killara Otte & Alexander, 1983
  - Bobilla plurampe Otte & Alexander, 1983
- Bobilla avita Otte, 1987
- Bobilla bigelowi (Swan, 1972)
- Bobilla gullane Su & Rentz, 2000
- Bobilla illawarra Su & Rentz, 2000
- Bobilla nigrova (Swan, 1972)
