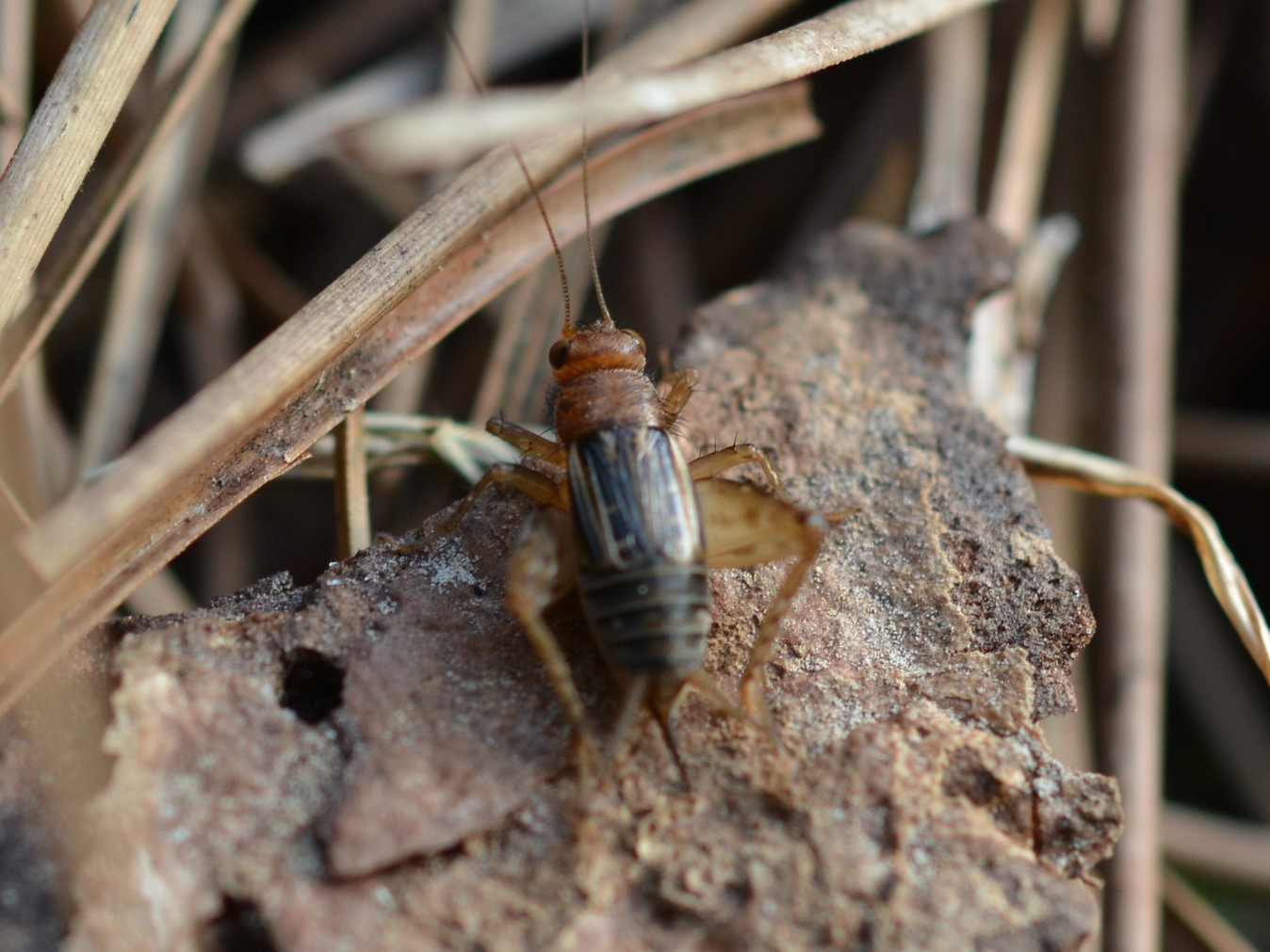

Scientific classification
- Domain: Eukaryota
- Kingdom: Animalia
- Phylum: Arthropoda
- Class: Insecta
- Order: Orthoptera
- Suborder: Ensifera
- Family: Trigonidiidae
- Genus: Neonemobius
- Species: N. mormonius

Binomial name
- Neonemobius mormonius (Scudder, 1896)

Synonyms
- Eunemobius carolinus neomexicanus Scudder, 1896; Nemobius mormonius (Scudder, 1896)

= Neonemobius mormonius =

Species of cricket

Neonemobius mormonius, known generally as the Mormon ground cricket or collared ground cricket, is a species of ground cricket in the family Gryllidae. It is found in North America.
