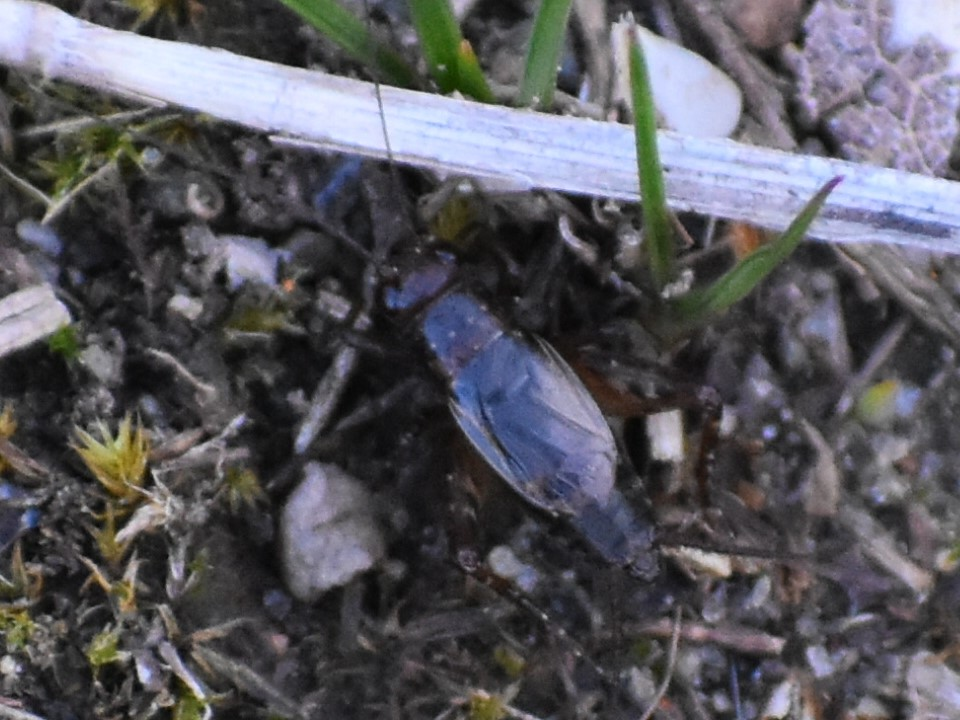

Scientific classification
- Kingdom: Animalia
- Phylum: Arthropoda
- Class: Insecta
- Order: Orthoptera
- Suborder: Ensifera
- Family: Trigonidiidae
- Tribe: Pteronemobiini
- Genus: Neonemobius
- Species: N. cubensis

Binomial name
- Neonemobius cubensis (Saussure, 1874)

Synonyms
- Nemobius cubensis Saussure, 1874

= Neonemobius cubensis =

Species of cricket

Neonemobius cubensis, the Cuban ground cricket, is a species of ground cricket in the family Gryllidae. It is found in the Caribbean. During its mating process the female will often feed upon the male’s glandular tibial spurs. Males who have mated previously will likely be found with some sort of damage done to their tibial spurs because of their mating process.
