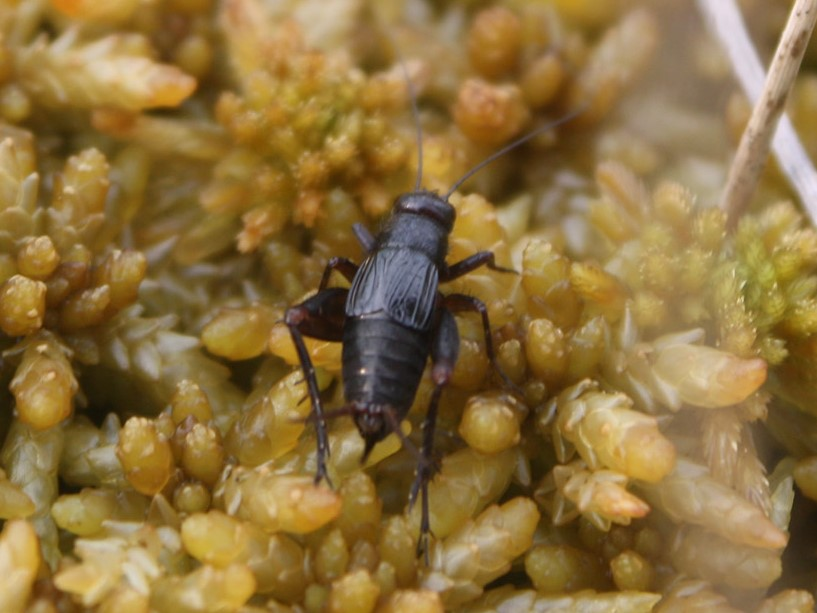

Scientific classification
- Domain: Eukaryota
- Kingdom: Animalia
- Phylum: Arthropoda
- Class: Insecta
- Order: Orthoptera
- Suborder: Ensifera
- Family: Trigonidiidae
- Genus: Neonemobius
- Species: N. palustris

Binomial name
- Neonemobius palustris (Blatchley, 1900)

Synonyms
- Nemobius palustris Blatchley, 1900

= Neonemobius palustris =

Species of cricket

Neonemobius palustris, known generally as the sphagnum ground cricket or marsh ground cricket, is a species of ground cricket in the family Gryllidae. It is found in eastern North America.

Male Neonemobius palustris is about 5.7 mm long and females are about 6.8 mm (including wings and excluding ovipositors). They are generally dark brown, but lighter brown individuals have been recorded.

They are often found in dense, damp patches of sphagnum moss, and also in sandhill seeps or wet longleaf pine savannas. Their song consists of trills of several seconds duration with pauses of similar lengths in between.

== Subspecies ==
These two subspecies belong to the species Neonemobius palustris:

- Neonemobius palustris aurantius (Rehn and Hebard, 1911)^{i g}
- Neonemobius palustris palustris (Blatchley, 1900)^{i g}

Data sources: i = ITIS, c = Catalogue of Life, g = GBIF, b = Bugguide.net
