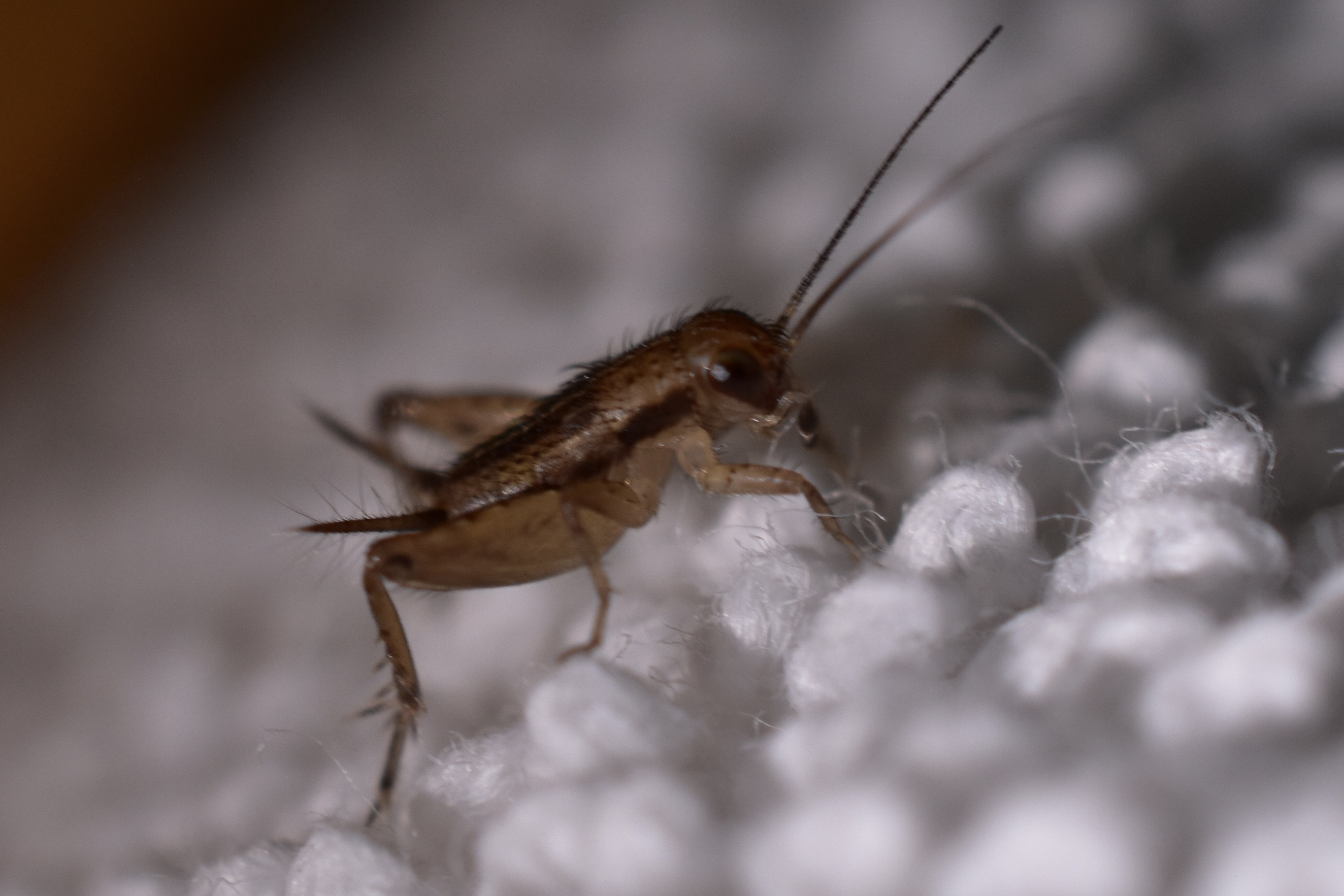
- Juvenile Polionemobius taprobanensis in Bentota, Sri Lanka

Scientific classification
- Kingdom: Animalia
- Phylum: Arthropoda
- Clade: Pancrustacea
- Class: Insecta
- Order: Orthoptera
- Suborder: Ensifera
- Family: Trigonidiidae
- Genus: Polionemobius
- Species: P. taprobanensis

Binomial name
- Polionemobius taprobanensis (Walker, 1869)

Synonyms
- Trigonidium taprobanense Walker, 1869; Nemobius infernalis Saussure, 1877; Nemobius javanus Saussure, 1877; Eneoptera lateralis Walker, 1871; Nemobius mikado Shiraki, 1911

= Polionemobius taprobanensis =

Species of insect

Polionemobius taprobanensis is a species of ground cricket found in Asia. Two forms are recognised: subtropical (also referred to as southern) and temperate (northern).

== Taxonomy ==
The species was first described by Francis Walker in 1869 as Trigonidium taprobanense from the holotype collected in Sri Lanka. However, a 2023 study comparing mitochondrial genomes suggested that the temperate form collected in Japan and populations from China (as well as from mainland Asia) may have diverged sufficiently to be considered separate species, based on the number of amino acid differences in protein-coding genes.

== Description ==
Female (subtropical form): The body is piceous (pitch-black) and pubescent. The head has three stripes and the face is a dingy testaceous (brick-red) color. The eyes are large and prominent. The prothorax has a testaceous spot on each side. The oviduct (ovipositor) is nearly as long as the abdomen. The hind tibiae have three long, slender spines and are banded with testaceous. The fore wings are cinereous (ash-grey), reach the tip of the abdomen, and are marked with seven brown dots. The hind wings are pellucid (transparent) and twice as long as the fore wings. The body length is 2 lines (approximately 4.2 mm).

== Distribution ==
This species has a very broad distribution, recorded from Sri Lanka and Java (Indonesia) to the Russian Far East. In Japan, both the temperate form, whose range is most likely confined to the main islands (formerly classified as P. mikado), and the subtropical form, present in the Ryukyu Islands, are recognized. Their distributions are divided approximately at this archipelago.

== Biology ==
P. taprobanensis temperate form undergoes photoperiod-dependent egg diapause, a trait typically absent in the subtropical form. Despite this, hybrids between the two forms are fertile.
