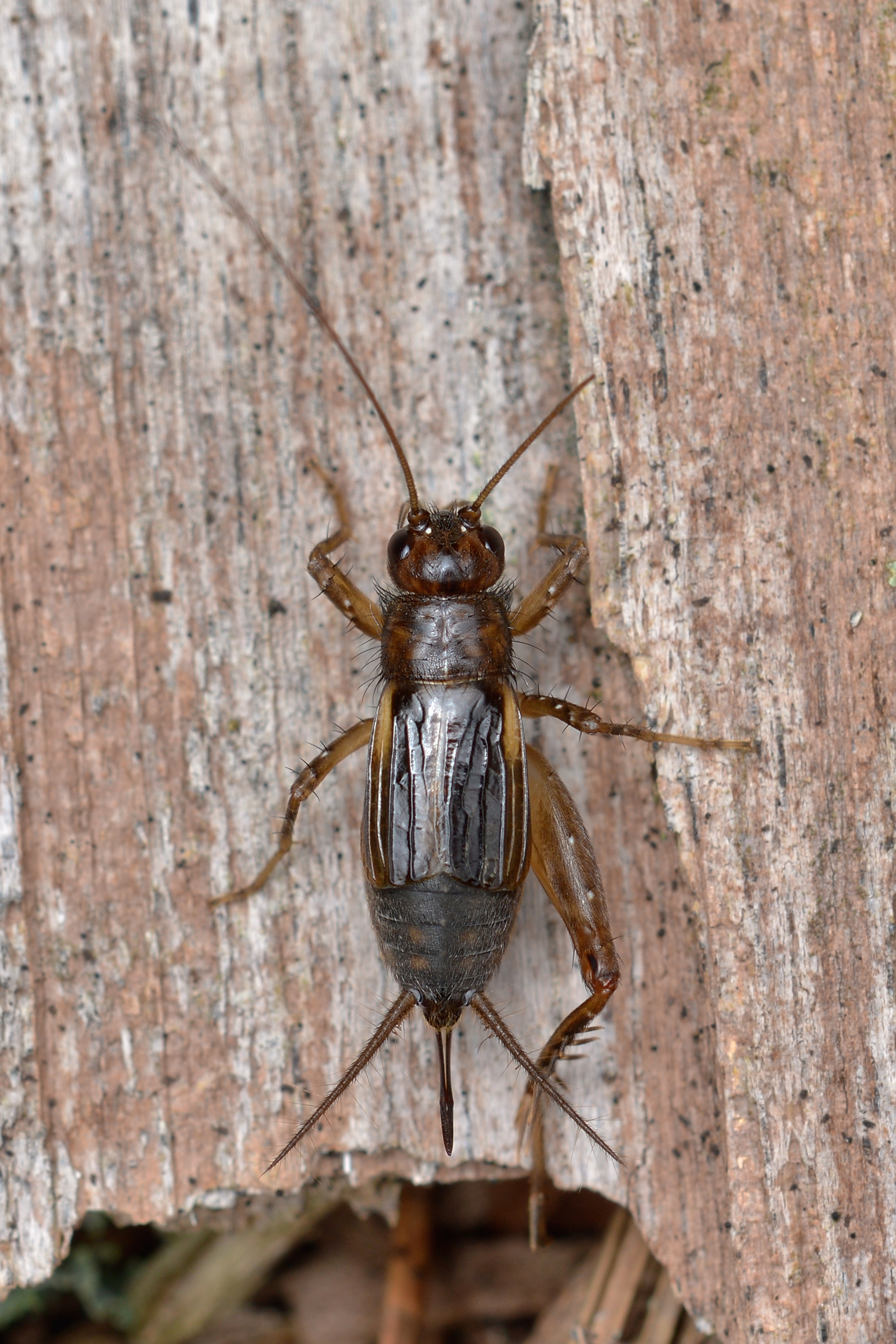

Scientific classification
- Domain: Eukaryota
- Kingdom: Animalia
- Phylum: Arthropoda
- Class: Insecta
- Order: Orthoptera
- Suborder: Ensifera
- Family: Trigonidiidae
- Tribe: Pteronemobiini
- Genus: Eunemobius
- Species: E. carolinus

Binomial name
- Eunemobius carolinus (Scudder, 1877)

Synonyms
- Nemobius carolinus Scudder, 1877

= Eunemobius carolinus =

Species of cricket

Eunemobius carolinus, the Carolina ground cricket, is a species of ground cricket in the family Trigonidiidae. It is found in North America.

== Subspecies ==
These three subspecies belong to the species Eunemobius carolinus:

- Eunemobius carolinus brevicaudus (Bruner, 1904)
- Eunemobius carolinus carolinus (Scudder, 1877)
- Eunemobius carolinus mexicanus (Scudder, 1896)
