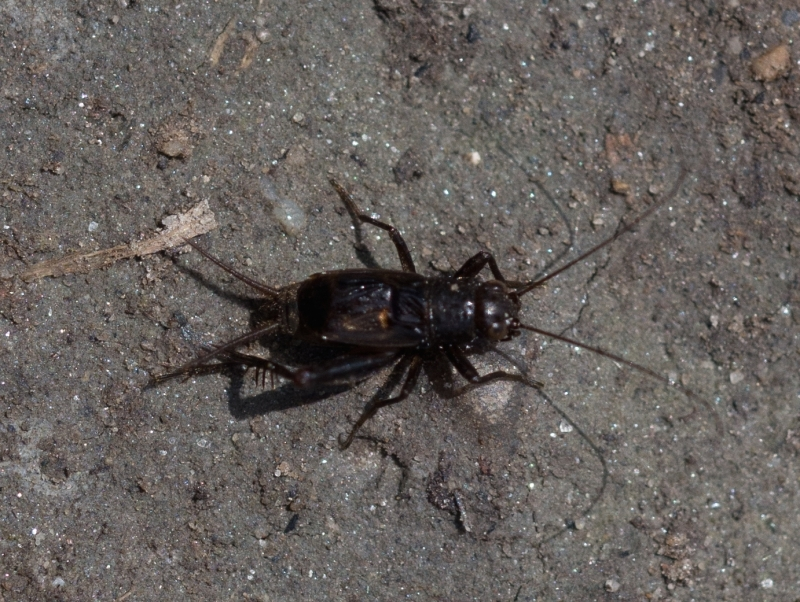
- Pteronemobius heydenii

Scientific classification
- Kingdom: Animalia
- Phylum: Arthropoda
- Class: Insecta
- Order: Orthoptera
- Suborder: Ensifera
- Family: Trigonidiidae
- Tribe: Pteronemobiini
- Genus: Pteronemobius; Jacobson, 1904

= Pteronemobius =

Genus of cricket-like animals

Pteronemobius is a genus of crickets in the subfamily Nemobiinae, with a worldwide distribution.

== Species ==
The Orthoptera Species File and Catalogue of Life list:
Unassigned subgenus

- Pteronemobius ara Otte & Perez-Gelabert, 2009
- Pteronemobius bagua Otte & Perez-Gelabert, 2009
- Pteronemobius belteros Otte & Perez-Gelabert, 2009
- Pteronemobius cantor Otte & Perez-Gelabert, 2009
- Pteronemobius caryochron Otte & Perez-Gelabert, 2009
- Pteronemobius eneplos Otte, 2006
- Pteronemobius krakatau Otte & Cowper, 2007
- Pteronemobius mime Otte & Perez-Gelabert, 2009
- Pteronemobius nowinga Otte & Perez-Gelabert, 2009
- Pteronemobius opia Otte & Perez-Gelabert, 2009
- Pteronemobius perbonus Otte & Perez-Gelabert, 2009
- Pteronemobius pinus Otte & Perez-Gelabert, 2009
- Pteronemobius sanaco Otte & Perez-Gelabert, 2009
- Pteronemobius setiger Otte & Perez-Gelabert, 2009
- Pteronemobius tabacu Otte & Perez-Gelabert, 2009
- Pteronemobius tonina Otte & Perez-Gelabert, 2009

subgenus Pteronemobius Jacobson, 1904

- Pteronemobius abruptus Uvarov, 1924
- Pteronemobius aethiops Saussure, 1877
- Pteronemobius albolineatus Chopard, 1954
- Pteronemobius ambiguus Shiraki, 1936
- Pteronemobius amplipennis Chopard, 1938
- Pteronemobius annulicornis Chopard, 1929
- Pteronemobius aquaticus Bruner, 1916
- Pteronemobius arima Otte & Alexander, 1983
- Pteronemobius binnali Otte & Alexander, 1983
- Pteronemobius birmanus Chopard, 1917
- Pteronemobius biroi Chopard, 1927
- Pteronemobius camerunensis Sjöstedt, 1900
- Pteronemobius caudatus Shiraki, 1911
- Pteronemobius chapadensis Bruner, 1916
- Pteronemobius chopardi Bolívar, 1922
- Pteronemobius crassus Chopard, 1954
- Pteronemobius cristobalensis Otte & Peck, 1998
- Pteronemobius dentatus Saussure, 1877
- Pteronemobius dispar Chopard, 1927
- Pteronemobius dumosus Karsch, 1893
- Pteronemobius gagooris Otte & Alexander, 1983
- Pteronemobius garrotis Otte & Alexander, 1983
- Pteronemobius gorochovi Storozhenko, 2004
- Pteronemobius hafferli Werner, 1905
- Pteronemobius hargreavesi Chopard, 1938
- Pteronemobius heydenii Fischer, 1853 - type species (as Nemobius tartarus Saussure = P. heydenii tartarus, locality: Samarkand, Uzbekistan)
- Pteronemobius hirsitulus Walker, 1869
- Pteronemobius indicus Walker, 1869
- Pteronemobius jacobsoni Chopard, 1927
- Pteronemobius kinabaluensis Ingrisch, 1987
- Pteronemobius kinurae Shiraki, 1911
- Pteronemobius longipennis Saussure, 1874
- Pteronemobius luzonicus Bolívar, 1889
- Pteronemobius maculosus Saussure, 1899
- Pteronemobius majumdari Bhowmik, 1970
- Pteronemobius malgachus Saussure, 1877
- Pteronemobius meridionalis Bruner, 1916
- Pteronemobius montanus Chopard, 1933
- Pteronemobius montigenus Chopard, 1945
- Pteronemobius neimongolensis Kang & Mao, 1990
- Pteronemobius nigriscens Shiraki, 1911
- Pteronemobius nigritus Saussure, 1877
- Pteronemobius nigrofasciatus Matsumura, 1904
- Pteronemobius nitidus Bolívar, 1901
- Pteronemobius novarae Saussure, 1877
- Pteronemobius nundra Otte & Alexander, 1983 (species group)
- Pteronemobius obscurior Chopard, 1957
- Pteronemobius occidentalis Chopard, 1937
- Pteronemobius ohmachii Shiraki, 1930
- Pteronemobius ornaticeps Chopard, 1925 (species group)
- Pteronemobius pantelchopardorum Shishodia & Varshney, 1987
- Pteronemobius panteli Hebard, 1913
- Pteronemobius paranae Saussure, 1874
- Pteronemobius picinus Walker, 1869
- Pteronemobius pilicornis Chopard, 1969
- Pteronemobius qinghaiensis Yin, 1998
- Pteronemobius quadrilineatus Chopard, 1955
- Pteronemobius regulus Saussure, 1877 (species group)
- Pteronemobius ruficeps Chopard, 1962
- Pteronemobius rufipes Chopard, 1969
- Pteronemobius rufus Saussure, 1877
- Pteronemobius santacruzensis Otte & Peck, 1998
- Pteronemobius schunkei Chopard, 1956
- Pteronemobius sjostedti Chopard, 1934
- Pteronemobius subapterus Chopard, 1957
- Pteronemobius sulfurariae Chopard, 1932
- Pteronemobius tagalicus Bolívar, 1889
- Pteronemobius taibaiensis Deng & Xu, 2006
- Pteronemobius tarrios Otte & Alexander, 1983
- Pteronemobius trispinosus Chopard, 1958
- Pteronemobius truncatus Saussure, 1877 (species group)
- Pteronemobius truncates Zhang, Wang & Liu, 2020
- Pteronemobius unicolor Chopard, 1925
- Pteronemobius warrakarra Otte & Alexander, 1983 (species group)
- Pteronemobius yezoensis Shiraki, 1911
- Pteronemobius yunnanicus Li, He & Liu, 2010

subgenus Stilbonemobius Gorochov, 1984

- Pteronemobius kurtshevae Gorochov, 1986
- Pteronemobius lineolatus Brullé, 1835
- Pteronemobius longispinus Gorochov, 1984
- Pteronemobius minutus Bolívar, 1910
- Pteronemobius monochromus Chopard, 1955
- Pteronemobius niveipalpus Sjöstedt, 1910
- Pteronemobius pseudotaprobanensis Gorochov, 1984
- Pteronemobius troitzkyi Gorochov, 1984
