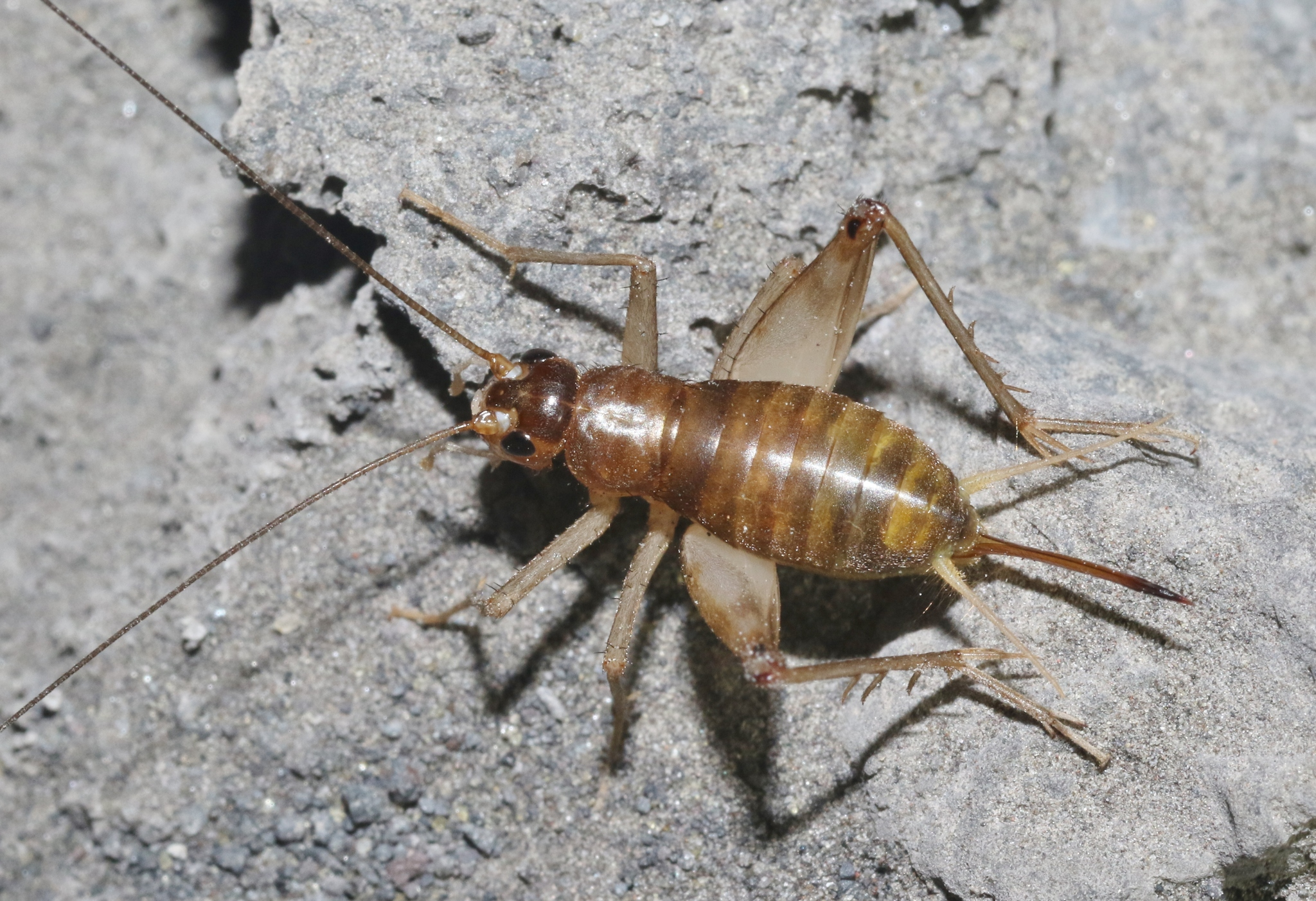

Scientific classification
- Kingdom: Animalia
- Phylum: Arthropoda
- Class: Insecta
- Order: Orthoptera
- Suborder: Ensifera
- Family: Trigonidiidae
- Genus: Caconemobius
- Species: C. anahulu

Binomial name
- Caconemobius anahulu Otte, 1994

= Caconemobius anahulu =

Species of cricket

Caconemobius anahulu, the Hualalai lava cricket, is a species of lava cricket endemic to the island of Hawai'i, where it is found on recently solidified lava flows produced by Hualalai.

== Distribution and habitat ==
Caconemobius anahulu is endemic to bare lava fields without plants produced by Hualalai in the Kona district on the island of Hawai'i. Like its close relative Caconemobius fori, the Kilauea lava cricket, this species is one of the first living things to colonize a lava field once it has been created. The drier climate on the leeward side of the island causes vegetative succession on fresh lava to take longer than it does for flows from Kilauea, allowing this species to occupy lava fields for over two centuries, at least four times longer than the oldest lava fields known to be occupied by C. fori.
