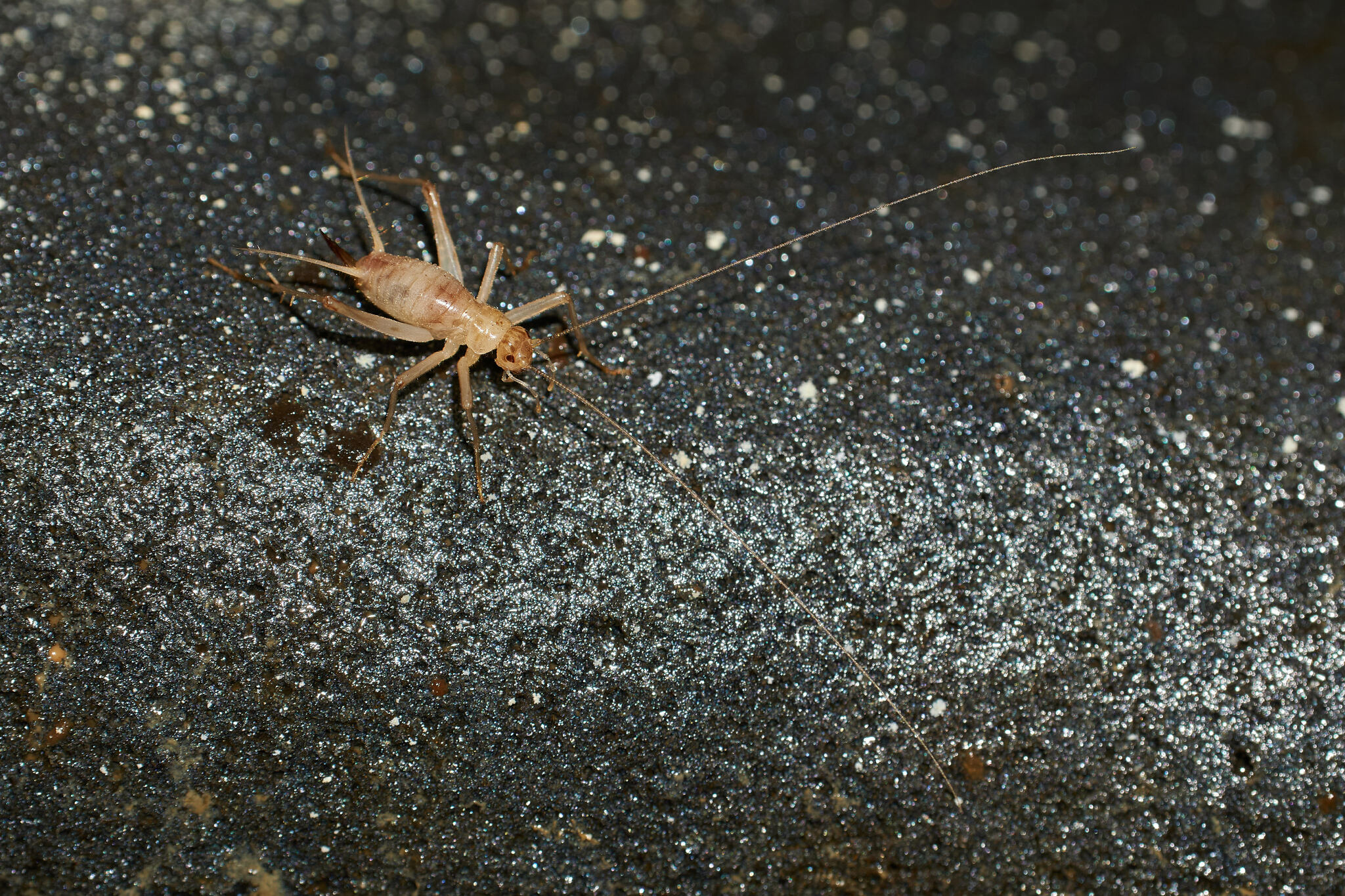

Conservation status
- Vulnerable (IUCN 2.3)

Scientific classification
- Kingdom: Animalia
- Phylum: Arthropoda
- Class: Insecta
- Order: Orthoptera
- Suborder: Ensifera
- Family: Trigonidiidae
- Genus: Caconemobius
- Species: C. varius

Binomial name
- Caconemobius varius Gurney & Rentz, 1978

= Caconemobius varius =

Species of cricket

Caconemobius varius is a species of cricket known by the common name Kaumana cave cricket. It is endemic to the island of Hawaiʻi, where it inhabits the dark zone of lava tube caves.

== Distribution and habitat ==
Caconemobius varius is endemic to the big island of Hawaiʻi, inhabiting lava tubes between 300–1,200 metres (980–3,940 ft) elevation. It prefers wet caves. It is only found in the dark zones of these caves, far from entrances and skylights.

Caves inhabited by C. varius include Kazumura Cave and Kaumana Cave.

== Ecology ==
While C. varius has eyes, it is likely not sensitive to movement and can only detect brightness changes.
