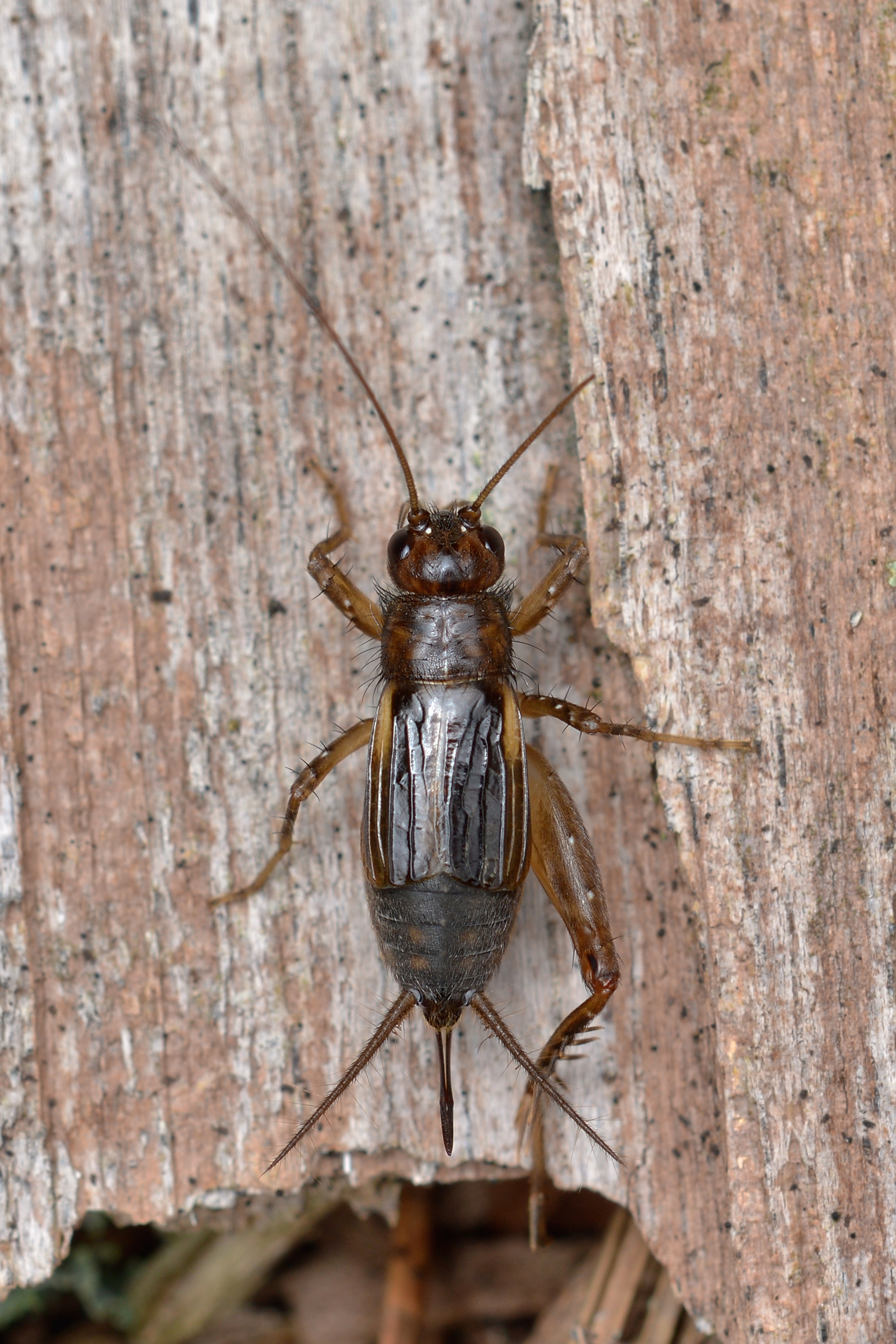
- Eunemobius carolinus

Scientific classification
- Domain: Eukaryota
- Kingdom: Animalia
- Phylum: Arthropoda
- Class: Insecta
- Order: Orthoptera
- Suborder: Ensifera
- Family: Trigonidiidae
- Subfamily: Nemobiinae
- Tribe: Pteronemobiini
- Genus: Eunemobius; Hebard, 1913

= Eunemobius =

Genus of crickets

Eunemobius is a genus of crickets in the family Trigonidiidae.

== Taxonomy ==
The following species are recognised in the genus Eunemobius:

- Eunemobius carolinus (Scudder, 1877)
- Eunemobius confusus (Blatchley, 1903)
- Eunemobius melodius (Thomas & Alexander, 1957)
- Eunemobius trinitatis (Scudder, 1896)
