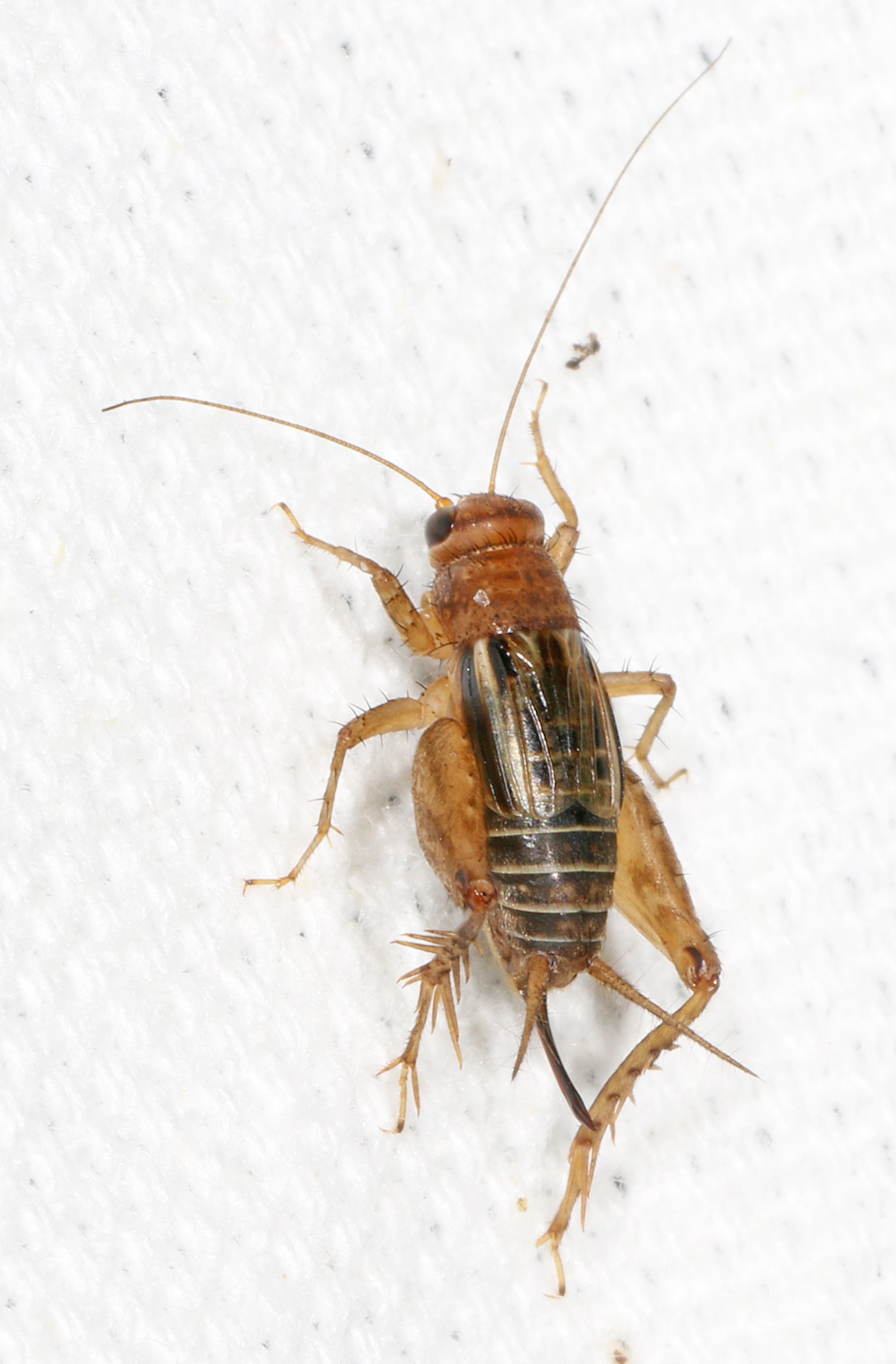

Scientific classification
- Domain: Eukaryota
- Kingdom: Animalia
- Phylum: Arthropoda
- Class: Insecta
- Order: Orthoptera
- Suborder: Ensifera
- Family: Trigonidiidae
- Subfamily: Nemobiinae
- Tribe: Pteronemobiini
- Genus: Neonemobius; Hebard, 1913

= Neonemobius =

Genus of crickets

Neonemobius is a genus of crickets in the subfamily Nemobiinae. All species are recorded from North America.

== Taxonomy ==
The Orthoptera Species FileVe lists the following species:

- Neonemobius cubensis (Saussure, 1874) - type species
- Neonemobius eurynotus (Rehn & Hebard, 1918)
- Neonemobius mormonius (Scudder, 1896)
- Neonemobius palustris (Blatchley, 1900)
- Neonemobius toltecus (Saussure, 1859)
- Neonemobius variegatus (Bruner, 1893)
