= Marinemobius =

Scientific classification
- Domain: Eukaryota
- Kingdom: Animalia
- Phylum: Arthropoda
- Class: Insecta
- Order: Orthoptera
- Suborder: Ensifera
- Family: Trigonidiidae
- Subfamily: Nemobiinae
- Tribe: Marinemobiini
- Genus: Marinemobius; Gorochov, 1985
- Species: M. asahinai

Binomial name
- Marinemobius asahinai (Yamasaki, 1979)

Genus of crickets

Marinemobius is a genus of insects in the subfamily Nemobiinae. The only species is Marinemobius asahinai from the Philippines and Hainan island.
