= Kevanemobius =

Scientific classification
- Domain: Eukaryota
- Kingdom: Animalia
- Phylum: Arthropoda
- Class: Insecta
- Order: Orthoptera
- Suborder: Ensifera
- Family: Trigonidiidae
- Subfamily: Nemobiinae
- Tribe: Pteronemobiini
- Genus: Kevanemobius; Bolfarini & de Mello, 2012
- Species: K. paulistorum

Binomial name
- Kevanemobius paulistorum Bolfarini & de Mello, 2012

Genus of crickets

Kevanemobius is a genus of insects in the family Trigonidiidae. The only species is Kevanemobius paulistorum.
