= Caconemobius howarthi =

Conservation status
- Vulnerable (IUCN 2.3)

Scientific classification
- Kingdom: Animalia
- Phylum: Arthropoda
- Class: Insecta
- Order: Orthoptera
- Suborder: Ensifera
- Family: Trigonidiidae
- Genus: Caconemobius
- Species: C. howarthi

Binomial name
- Caconemobius howarthi Gurney & Rentz, 1978

Species of cricket

Caconemobius howarthi is a species of cricket known by the common name Howarth's cave cricket. It is native to Hawaii.
