= Hogna hawaiiensis =

Scientific classification
- Kingdom: Animalia
- Phylum: Arthropoda
- Subphylum: Chelicerata
- Class: Arachnida
- Order: Araneae
- Infraorder: Araneomorphae
- Family: Lycosidae
- Genus: Hogna
- Species: H. hawaiiensis

Binomial name
- Hogna hawaiiensis (Simon, 1899)

Synonyms
- Lycosa hawaiiensis

Species of spider

Hogna hawaiiensis is a species of spider in the family Lycosidae.

== Distribution and taxonomy ==
Hogna hawaiiensis is a species of wolf spider endemic to the Hawaiian islands. The species have been found on the islands of Maui, Oahu, and the island of Hawaii. It was originally described as Lycosa hawaiiensis by E. Simon in 1899 and was transferred to the genus Hogna by C. F. Roewer in 1955.

== Habitat and ecology ==
Hogna hawaiiensis has been found to reside in areas of lava flow, coinciding with the local population of Lava flow crickets (Caconemobius fori). The population of H. hawaiiensis in barren lava regions is additionally sustained by general windborne prey migrated from more vegetated areas adjacent to their empty habitat.

Outside of lava flow areas, H. hawaiiensis, much like other species on the same family, is typically found in ground-dwelling environments, such as tree trunks, low vegetation, and grassland fields.

Despite the infringement of territory by invasive species, H. hawaiiensis is the dominant predator at elevations of 2800 meters. However, they do persist at elevations everywhere between sea level and 4000 meters.

== Behavior ==
A female specimen was observed engaging in vegetational perching. The practice is done in order to act as ambush predators on local Flesh fly populations. They perch on the buds and flowers of vegetation and attempt to blend in by remaining stagnant after perching. It is unknown and requires further observation to suggest it is a species wide behavior, however by introducing a flower bud to the specimen, it showed that it was an intentional practice instead of a coincidental one.

== Relationship with invasive species ==
With the invasive introduction of yellowjackets (Vespula pensylvanica) to the islands, they came to predate upon H. hawaiiensis among many other endemic prey.

With the similarly invasive introduction of Argentine ants (Linepithema humile into the upper Haleakala, one of the main observed habitats of H. hawaiiensis, the two species appear to not mesh. Where there are colonies of Argentine ants, there is noticeably lesser population density of H. hawaiiensis.
