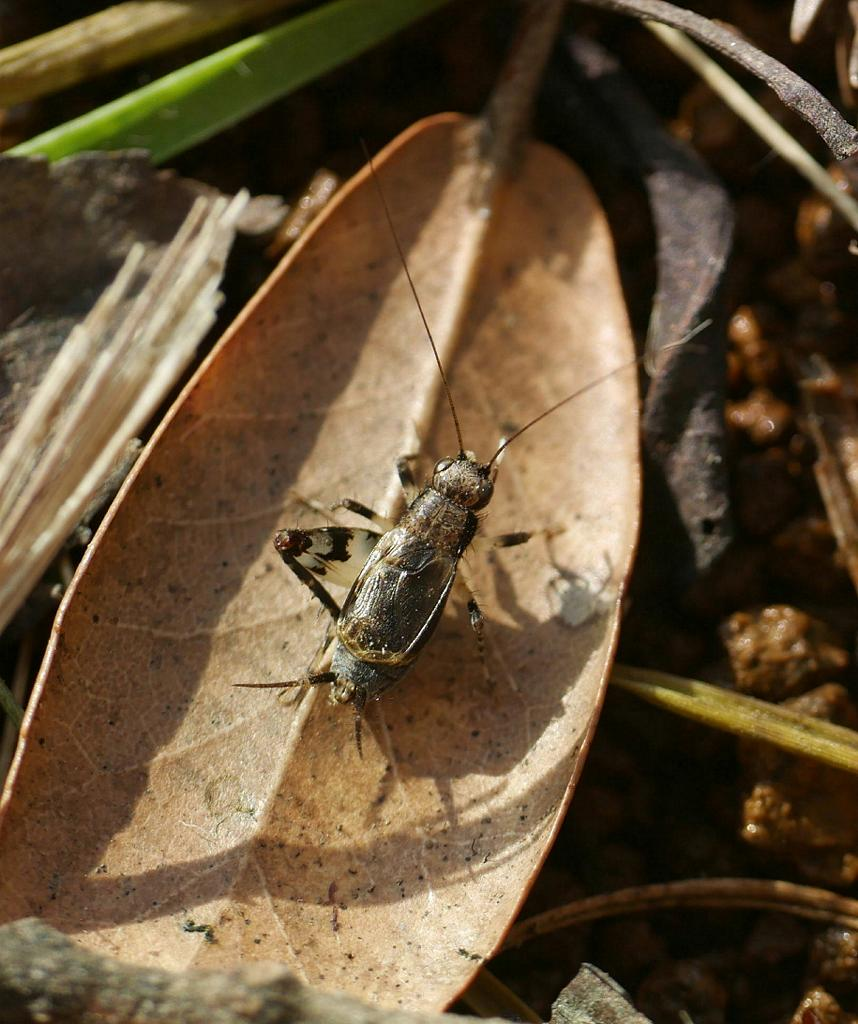

Scientific classification
- Domain: Eukaryota
- Kingdom: Animalia
- Phylum: Arthropoda
- Class: Insecta
- Order: Orthoptera
- Suborder: Ensifera
- Family: Trigonidiidae
- Tribe: Pteronemobiini
- Genus: Dianemobius; Vickery, 1973

= Dianemobius =

Genus of crickets

Dianemobius is a genus of cricket in the tribe Pteronemobiini; species can be found in eastern Asia.

== Taxonomy ==
The Orthoptera Species File database lists the following species:

- Dianemobius chibae (Shiraki, 1911)
- Dianemobius chinensis Gorochov, 1984
- Dianemobius csikii (Bolívar, 1901)
- Dianemobius fascipes (Walker, 1869)
  type species (as Eneoptera fascipes Walker = D. fascipes subsp. fascipes)
- Dianemobius furumagiensis (Ohmachi & Furukawa, 1929)
- Dianemobius jucundus Liu & Yang, 1998
- Dianemobius kimurae (Shiraki, 1911)
- Dianemobius protransversus Liu & Yang, 1998
- Dianemobius timphus Ingrisch, 2001
- Dianemobius wulaius Liu & Yang, 1998
- Dianemobius zhengi Chen, 1994
