= Polionemobius =

Scientific classification
- Domain: Eukaryota
- Kingdom: Animalia
- Phylum: Arthropoda
- Class: Insecta
- Order: Orthoptera
- Suborder: Ensifera
- Family: Trigonidiidae
- Subfamily: Nemobiinae
- Tribe: Pteronemobiini
- Genus: Polionemobius; Gorochov, 1983

Genus of crickets

Polionemobius is a genus of crickets in the subfamily Nemobiinae. Species can be found in Asia.

== Taxonomy ==
The Orthoptera Species File lists the following species:

- Polionemobius annulicornis Li, He & Liu, 2010
- Polionemobius batavicus (Gorochov, 1984)
- Polionemobius decipiens (Gorochov, 1984)
- Polionemobius flavoantennalis (Shiraki, 1911)
- Polionemobius mikado (Shiraki, 1911)
- Polionemobius modestus Gorochov, 1994
- Polionemobius pulchellus (Gorochov, 1984)
- Polionemobius taprobanensis (Walker, 1869) - type species (as Trigonidium taprobanense Walker)
- Polionemobius tarbinskyi Gorochov, 1986
- Polionemobius yunnanus Liu & Shi, 2014
