= Argizala =

Scientific classification
- Domain: Eukaryota
- Kingdom: Animalia
- Phylum: Arthropoda
- Class: Insecta
- Order: Orthoptera
- Suborder: Ensifera
- Family: Trigonidiidae
- Subfamily: Nemobiinae
- Tribe: Pteronemobiini
- Genus: Argizala; Walker, 1869

Genus of crickets

Argizala is a genus of insects in the family Trigonidiidae.

== Taxonomy ==
The Orthoptera Species File database lists the following species:

- Argizala brasilensis Walker, 1869
- Argizala hebardi (Rehn, 1915)
