= Amonemobius =

Scientific classification
- Domain: Eukaryota
- Kingdom: Animalia
- Phylum: Arthropoda
- Class: Insecta
- Order: Orthoptera
- Suborder: Ensifera
- Family: Trigonidiidae
- Subfamily: Nemobiinae
- Tribe: Nemobiini
- Genus: Amonemobius; Otte, 1987
- Species: A. vexans

Binomial name
- Amonemobius vexans Otte, 1987

Genus of crickets

Amonemobius is a genus of cricket in the subfamily Nemobiinae. The only species is Amonemobius vexans found in New Caledonia.
