= Grylliscus =

Scientific classification
- Domain: Eukaryota
- Kingdom: Animalia
- Phylum: Arthropoda
- Class: Insecta
- Order: Orthoptera
- Suborder: Ensifera
- Family: Trigonidiidae
- Subfamily: Nemobiinae
- Tribe: Grylliscini; Gorochov, 1986
- Genus: Grylliscus; Tarbinsky, 1930
- Species: G. gussakowski

Binomial name
- Grylliscus gussakowski Tarbinsky, 1930

Genus of crickets

Grylliscus is a genus of insects in the subfamily Nemobiinae (wood crickets), erected by S.P. Tarbinsky in 1930. The only species is Grylliscus gussakowski, recorded from central Asia.
