= Stenonemobius =

Scientific classification
- Domain: Eukaryota
- Kingdom: Animalia
- Phylum: Arthropoda
- Class: Insecta
- Order: Orthoptera
- Suborder: Ensifera
- Family: Trigonidiidae
- Tribe: Pteronemobiini
- Genus: Stenonemobius; Gorochov, 1981

Genus of crickets

Stenonemobius is a genus of cricket in the subfamily Nemobiinae; species can be found in North Africa, South-East Europe and Asia.

== Taxonomy ==
The Orthoptera Species File database lists the following subgenera and species:

- Subgenus Ocellonemobius Gorochov, 1984
1. Stenonemobius acrobatus (Saussure, 1877)
2. Stenonemobius bicolor (Saussure, 1877)
- Subgenus Stenonemobius Gorochov, 1981
1. Stenonemobius gracilis (Jakovlev, 1871)
  [synonyms: Nonemobius adelungi (Uvarov, 1912), Nemobius mayeti (Finot, 1893)]
