= Amanayara =

Scientific classification
- Domain: Eukaryota
- Kingdom: Animalia
- Phylum: Arthropoda
- Class: Insecta
- Order: Orthoptera
- Suborder: Ensifera
- Family: Trigonidiidae
- Subfamily: Nemobiinae
- Tribe: Pteronemobiini
- Genus: Amanayara de Mello & Jacomini, 1994

Genus of crickets

Amanayara is a genus of insect in family Gryllidae.

== Taxonomy ==
The Orthoptera Species File database lists the following species:

- Amanayara bernardesi Pereira, Sperber & Lhano, 2010
- Amanayara helenae Pereira, Sperber & Lhano, 2010
- Amanayara jutinga de Mello & Jacomini, 1994
- Amanayara piuna de Mello & Jacomini, 1994
- Amanayara ribasi Pereira, Sperber & Lhano, 2010
