= Lissotrachelini =

Scientific classification
- Domain: Eukaryota
- Kingdom: Animalia
- Phylum: Arthropoda
- Class: Insecta
- Order: Orthoptera
- Suborder: Ensifera
- Family: Trigonidiidae
- Subfamily: Nemobiinae
- Tribe: Lissotrachelini; Hubbell, 1938

Tribe of crickets

Lissotrachelini is a monotypic tribe of anomalous crickets in the subfamily Nemobiinae. Species records are from SE Asia.

It contains the single genus: Lissotrachelus Brunner von Wattenwyl, 1893

== Now placed elsewhere ==
These genera were placed here, but have been moved:

- Tohila Hubbell, 1938 - now in subfamily Phalangopsinae, tribe Otteiini
- Trigonidomimus Caudell, 1912 - now Pentacentrinae, incertae sedis
