= Phoremia =

Scientific classification
- Domain: Eukaryota
- Kingdom: Animalia
- Phylum: Arthropoda
- Class: Insecta
- Order: Orthoptera
- Suborder: Ensifera
- Family: Trigonidiidae
- Subfamily: Nemobiinae
- Tribe: Pteronemobiini
- Genus: Phoremia; Desutter-Grandcolas, 1993

Genus of crickets

Phoremia is a genus of insects in the family Trigonidiidae.

== Taxonomy ==
The Orthoptera Species File database lists the following species:

- Phoremia circumcincta (Mesa, Ribas & García-Novo, 1999
- Phoremia nigrofasciata Mesa, Ribas & García-Novo, 1999
- Phoremia rolfsi (Pereira, Sperber & Lhano, 2011
- Phoremia tabulina Desutter-Grandcolas, 1993
- Phoremia zefai Pereira, Sperber & Lhano, 2011
