= Hygronemobius =

- Hygronemobius araucanus in Valdivia, Chile

Scientific classification
- Kingdom: Animalia
- Phylum: Arthropoda
- Clade: Pancrustacea
- Class: Insecta
- Order: Orthoptera
- Suborder: Ensifera
- Family: Trigonidiidae
- Subfamily: Nemobiinae
- Genus: Hygronemobius; Hebard, 1913

Genus of crickets

Hygronemobius is a genus of insects in the family Trigonidiidae.

== Taxonomy ==
The Orthoptera Species File database lists the following species groups and species:

- Hygronemobius amoenus Chopard, 1920
  - Hygronemobius albolineatus Desutter-Grandcolas, 1993
  - Hygronemobius amoenus Chopard, 1920
  - Hygronemobius boreus Desutter-Grandcolas, 1993
  - Hygronemobius torquatus Desutter-Grandcolas, 1993
- Hygronemobius benoisti Chopard, 1920
  - Hygronemobius benoisti Chopard, 1920
  - Hygronemobius diplagion Desutter-Grandcolas, 1993
  - Hygronemobius elegans Desutter-Grandcolas, 1993
  - Hygronemobius tetraplagion Desutter-Grandcolas, 1993
- Hygronemobius stellatus Desutter-Grandcolas, 1993
  - Hygronemobius nanus Desutter-Grandcolas, 1993
  - Hygronemobius nigrofasciatus Desutter-Grandcolas, 1993
  - Hygronemobius stellatus Desutter-Grandcolas, 1993
- Hygronemobius albipalpus (Saussure, 1877)
- Hygronemobius alleni (Morse, 1905)
- Hygronemobius araucanus (Saussure, 1874)
- Hygronemobius basalis (Walker, 1869)
- Hygronemobius daphne Otte & Peck, 1998
- Hygronemobius darienicus Hebard, 1928
- Hygronemobius dialeucus Martins & Pereira, 2014
- Hygronemobius dissimilis (Saussure, 1874)
- Hygronemobius duckensis (Martins & Pereira, 2014
- Hygronemobius epia Otte & Perez-Gelabert, 2009
- Hygronemobius guriri Pereira, Miyoshi & Martins, 2013
- Hygronemobius histrionicus histrionicus Zayas, 1974
- Hygronemobius indaia Pereira, Miyoshi & Martins, 2013
- Hygronemobius iperoigae Pereira, Miyoshi & Martins, 2013
- Hygronemobius liura Hebard, 1915
- Hygronemobius longespinosus Chopard, 1956
- Hygronemobius minutipennis Bruner, 1916
- Hygronemobius nemoralis (Saussure, 1874)
- Hygronemobius speculi (McNeill, 1901)
