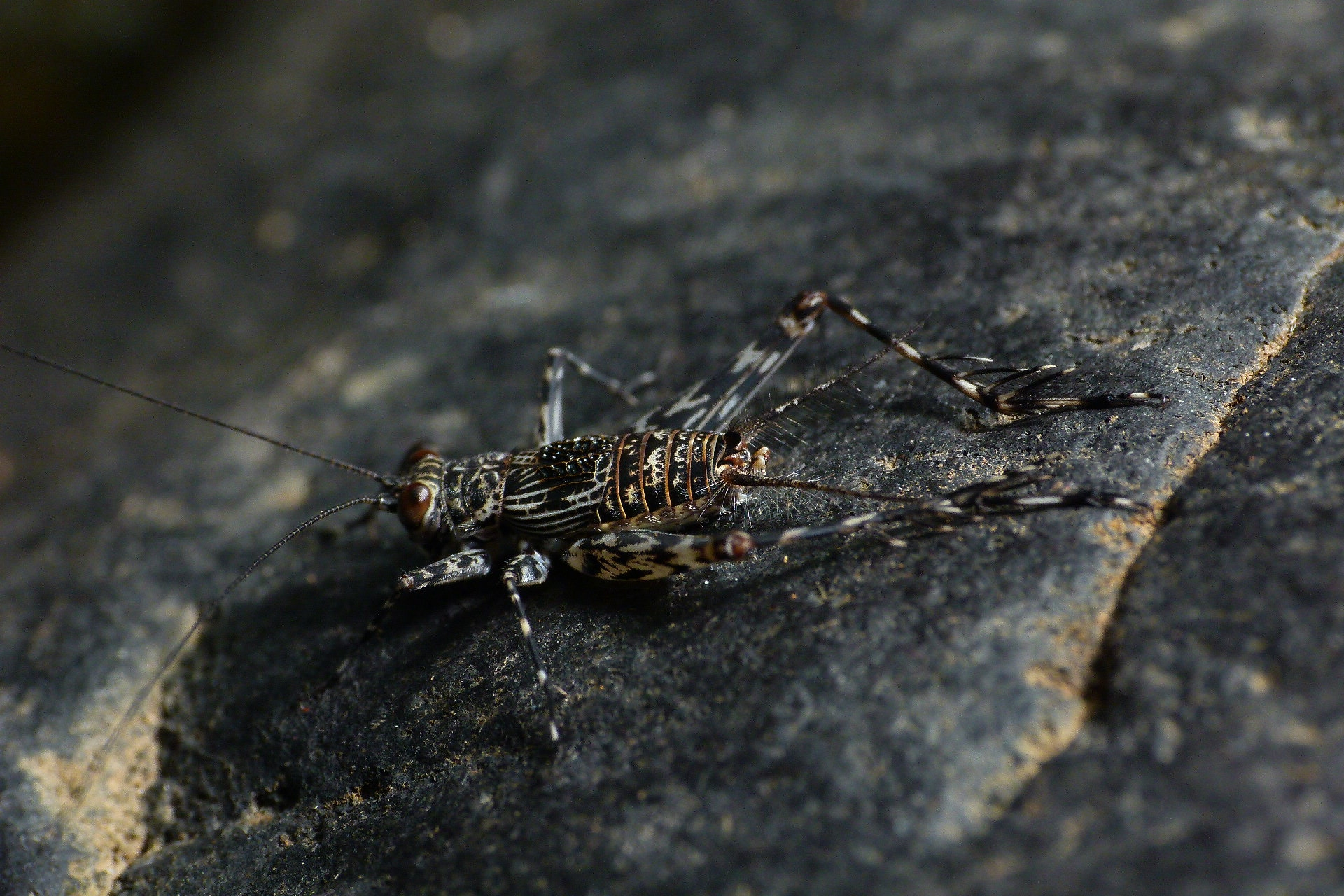

Scientific classification
- Domain: Eukaryota
- Kingdom: Animalia
- Phylum: Arthropoda
- Class: Insecta
- Order: Orthoptera
- Suborder: Ensifera
- Family: Trigonidiidae
- Subfamily: Nemobiinae
- Tribe: Burcini
- Genus: Paranemobius; Saussure, 1877

Synonyms
- Pseudonemobius Saussure, 1877

= Paranemobius =

Genus of crickets

Paranemobius is a genus of cricket in the subfamily Nemobiinae; species can be found on the Indian subcontinent including Sri Lanka.

== Species ==
The Orthoptera Species File lists:

- Paranemobius pictus (Saussure, 1877)
  type species (as Pseudonemobius pictus Saussure)
- Paranemobius vicinus Chopard, 1928
