= Lissotrachelus =

Scientific classification
- Domain: Eukaryota
- Kingdom: Animalia
- Phylum: Arthropoda
- Class: Insecta
- Order: Orthoptera
- Suborder: Ensifera
- Family: Trigonidiidae
- Subfamily: Nemobiinae
- Tribe: Lissotrachelini
- Genus: Lissotrachelus; Brunner von Wattenwyl, 1893

Genus of crickets

Lissotrachelus is an Asian genus of crickets, typical of the tribe Lissotrachelini; species records range from southern China, Indo-China to Borneo.

== Species ==
The Orthoptera Species File lists:

- Lissotrachelus ater Brunner von Wattenwyl, 1893
- Lissotrachelus castaneus Brunner von Wattenwyl, 1893
- Lissotrachelus ferrugineonotatus Brunner von Wattenwyl, 1893 - type species (as L. ferrugineo-notatus)
