= Absonemobius =

Scientific classification
- Domain: Eukaryota
- Kingdom: Animalia
- Phylum: Arthropoda
- Class: Insecta
- Order: Orthoptera
- Suborder: Ensifera
- Superfamily: Grylloidea
- Family: Trigonidiidae
- Subfamily: Nemobiinae
- Genus: Absonemobius; Desutter-Grandcolas, 1993

Genus of crickets

Absonemobius is a genus of South American crickets in the subfamily Nemobiinae.

== Taxonomy ==
The Orthoptera Species File database lists the following species:

- Absonemobius alatus Otte, 2006
- Absonemobius guyanensis Desutter-Grandcolas, 1993
- Absonemobius minor Desutter-Grandcolas, 1993
- Absonemobius nauta Desutter-Grandcolas, 1993
- Absonemobius niger Desutter-Grandcolas, 1993
- Absonemobius tessellatus Desutter-Grandcolas, 1993 - type species
