= Caconemobius =

Scientific classification
- Domain: Eukaryota
- Kingdom: Animalia
- Phylum: Arthropoda
- Class: Insecta
- Order: Orthoptera
- Suborder: Ensifera
- Family: Trigonidiidae
- Subfamily: Nemobiinae
- Tribe: Marinemobiini
- Genus: Caconemobius; Kirby, 1906

Species
- See text

Genus of crickets

External image
- Images at iNaturalist

Caconemobius is a genus of crickets in the subfamily Nemobiinae. There are about 15 species distributed from the Pacific coasts of Asia to Hawaii, where they occur in marine environments on the shores of the Pacific Ocean, barren lava fields, and lava tube caves.

These are wingless crickets that do not sing. They have bulbous abdomens. They live among rocks on beaches and other marine environments, where they may swim and dive in the saline waters.

== Taxonomy ==
The Orthoptera Species File database lists the following species:

- Caconemobius akusekiensis (Oshiro, 1990)
- Caconemobius albus Otte, 1994
- Caconemobius anahulu (Hualalai lava cricket) Otte, 1994
- Caconemobius daitoensis (Oshiro, 1986)
- Caconemobius dibrachiatus Ma & Zhang, 2015
- Caconemobius fori ('ūhini nēnē pele, or Kilauea lava cricket) Gurney & Rentz, 1978
- Caconemobius howarthi Gurney & Rentz, 1978
- Caconemobius nihoensis Otte, 1994
- Caconemobius paralbus Otte, 1994
- Caconemobius sandwichensis Otte, 1994
- Caconemobius sazanami (Furukawa, 1970)
- Caconemobius schauinslandi (Alfken, 1901)
- Caconemobius takarai (Oshiro, 1990)
- Caconemobius uuku Otte, 1994
- Caconemobius varius Gurney & Rentz, 1978
