= Pteronemobius heydenii =

Conservation status
- Least Concern (IUCN 3.1)

Scientific classification
- Kingdom: Animalia
- Phylum: Arthropoda
- Clade: Pancrustacea
- Class: Insecta
- Order: Orthoptera
- Suborder: Ensifera
- Family: Trigonidiidae
- Genus: Pteronemobius
- Species: P. heydenii

Binomial name
- Pteronemobius heydenii Fischer, 1853

Species of insect

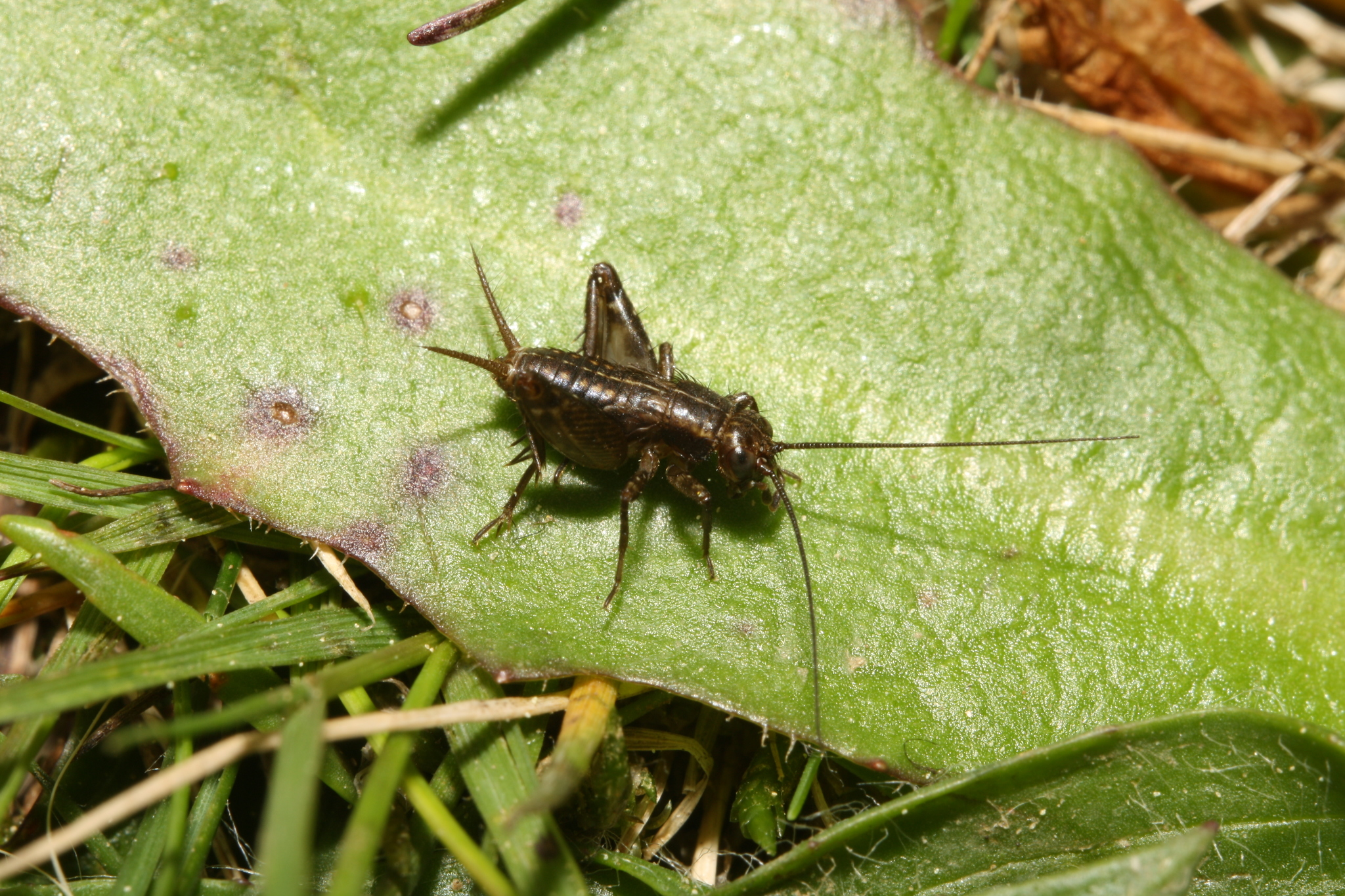

Pteronemobius heydenii, the marsh cricket, is a cricket in the family Trigonidiidae. It is found in Europe.

== Distribution ==
The species is found across a wide range of European territories, including Albania, Andorra, Armenia (not confirmed), Austria (except central), Azerbaijan (not confirmed), Bosnia and Herzegovina, Bulgaria, Croatia, Cyprus, the Czech Republic, France (mainland and Corsica), Germany (southwestern), Greece (mainland, Corfu and Rhodes), Hungary, Italy (mainland, Sardinia, and less likely Sicily), Moldova, Montenegro, North Macedonia, Portugal (westernmost), Romania, Russia (Central and southern European Russia), Serbia, Slovakia, Slovenia, Spain (mainland), Switzerland, the European part of Turkey, and Ukraine.
