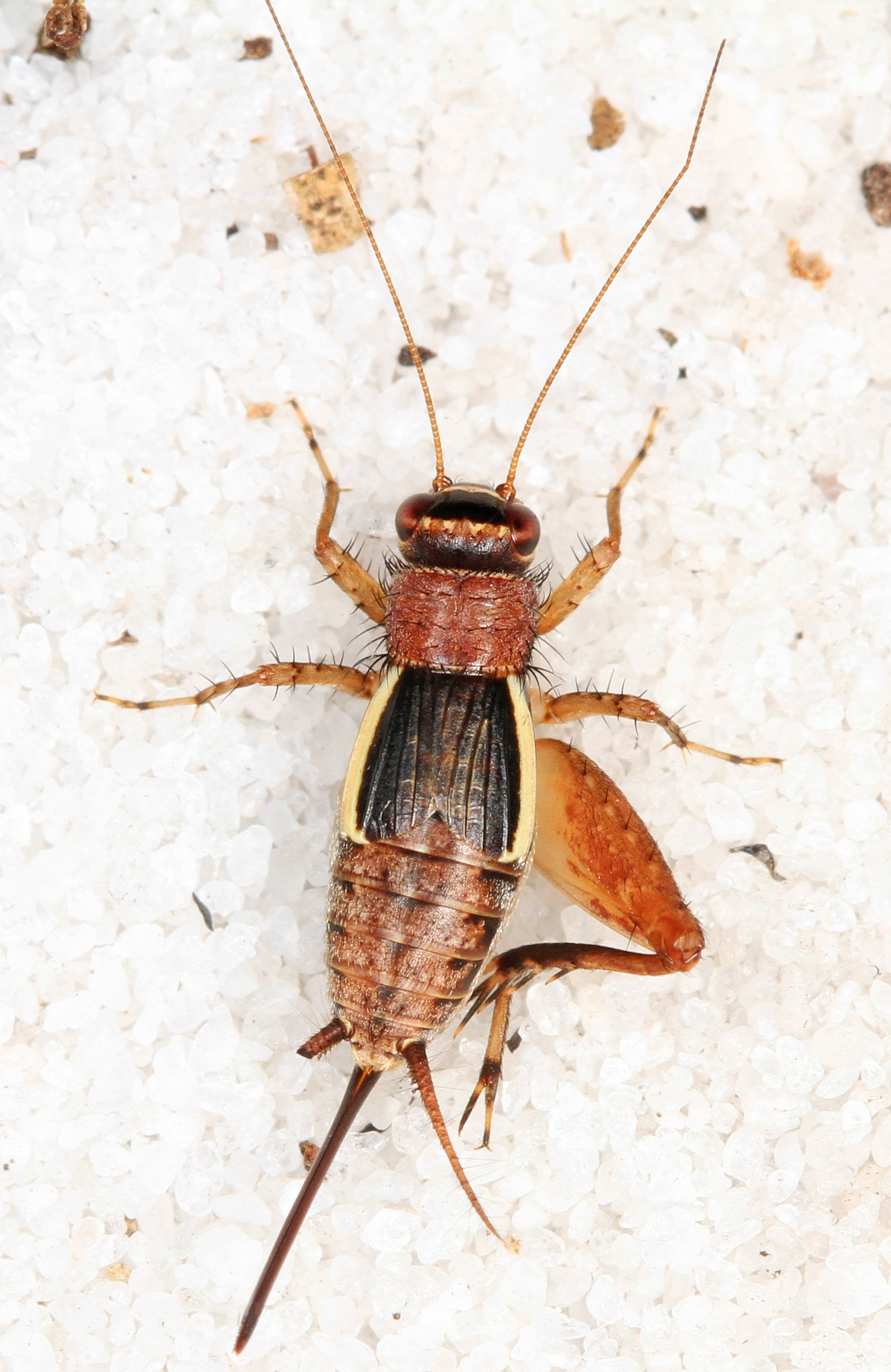
- Pictonemobius ambitiosus

Scientific classification
- Domain: Eukaryota
- Kingdom: Animalia
- Phylum: Arthropoda
- Class: Insecta
- Order: Orthoptera
- Suborder: Ensifera
- Family: Gryllidae
- Genus: Pictonemobius; Vickery & Johnstone, 1970

= Pictonemobius =

Genus of crickets

Pictonemobius is a genus of North American crickets in the tribe Pteronemobiini.

== Taxonomy ==
The following species are recognised in the genus Pictonemobius:

- Pictonemobius ambitiosus (Scudder, 1878)
- Pictonemobius arenicola Mays & Gross, 1990
- Pictonemobius hubbelli Walker & Mays, 1990
- Pictonemobius uliginosus Mays & Gross, 1990
