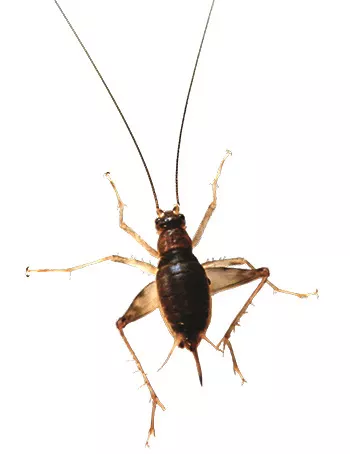
- 'Ūhini nēnē pele, or dark lava cricket

Scientific classification
- Kingdom: Animalia
- Phylum: Arthropoda
- Class: Insecta
- Order: Orthoptera
- Suborder: Ensifera
- Family: Trigonidiidae
- Genus: Caconemobius
- Species: C. fori

Binomial name
- Caconemobius fori Gurney & Rentz, 1978

= Caconemobius fori =

Species of cricket

Caconemobius fori, the Kīlauea lava cricket or dark lava cricket (Hawaiian: 'ūhini nēnē pele, lit. 'volcanic chirping cricket'), is a species of lava cricket endemic to the island of Hawaiʻi. An extremophile, it is found on recently solidified lava flows produced by Kīlauea and Mauna Loa.

== Description ==
Caconemobius fori is a small cricket, approximately 9 mm (0.35 in) in length. It lacks wings but is capable of jumping significant distances when disturbed. This species is darkly colored with an overall shiny quality, causing them to blend in extremely well with the freshly solidified lava that makes up their habitat. They have been noted to look very similar to Pele's tears, the volcanic glass ejecta which occur in their habitat.

== Distribution and habitat ==
Caconemobius fori is endemic to recently cooled (on the order of decades) lava flows on the big island of Hawaiʻi. It is a pioneer species that colonizes a lava field after its formation, arriving as quickly as three months later, sooner than any other multicellular life can take hold. Once enough time has passed for significant plant life to colonize a lava flow, C. fori disappears from the habitat. This species has never been recorded as occurring within 15 m (49 ft) of any established vegetation. In contrast, it has been found as close as 100 m (330 ft) from an active volcanic vent.

The dispersal patterns of C. fori are still unclear, as its winglessness limits its ability to travel over long distances. Since the quickest documented arrival of C. fori was in Mauna Ulu, where new lava often flows beside older lava, some scientists speculate that the crickets can only colonize lava flows that adjoin their current habitat.

It is unknown where the crickets occur once a lava field has been colonized by plant life; if the vegetation remains sparse, C. fori have been found to persist on a lava flow for up to 50 years.

== Ecology ==
Caconemobius fori is a strictly nocturnal species, sheltering in cracks and fissures during the day's heat. While C. fori can be found on lava fields at night without any specialized equipment, the species is, apparently, especially attracted to cheese, which is used by researchers to bait pitfall traps to obtain specimens for study. Other scientists have lured the cricket with shrimp paste.

As C. fori is one of the first organisms to arrive after a lava flow is formed, the species relies entirely on windblown debris for food, including plant material and sea foam. Nearly constant winds over fresh lava fields can carry debris multiple kilometers from its source, providing a source of nutrition for these crickets.

The mating habits of C. fori are largely unknown. Since C. fori lacks wings for stridulation, scientists are still researching how these crickets signal to potential mates. Unlike other crickets in the Nemobiinae subfamily, C. fori males do not possess a specialized spur from which the female cricket sucks hemolin protein during copulation. The loss of fluid for the male, up to 8% of its body mass, is likely too high a cost for crickets living in a such hot and dry environment. Compared to other cricket relatives, C. fori lays fewer and larger eggs, a typical adaptation to limited nutrients.
