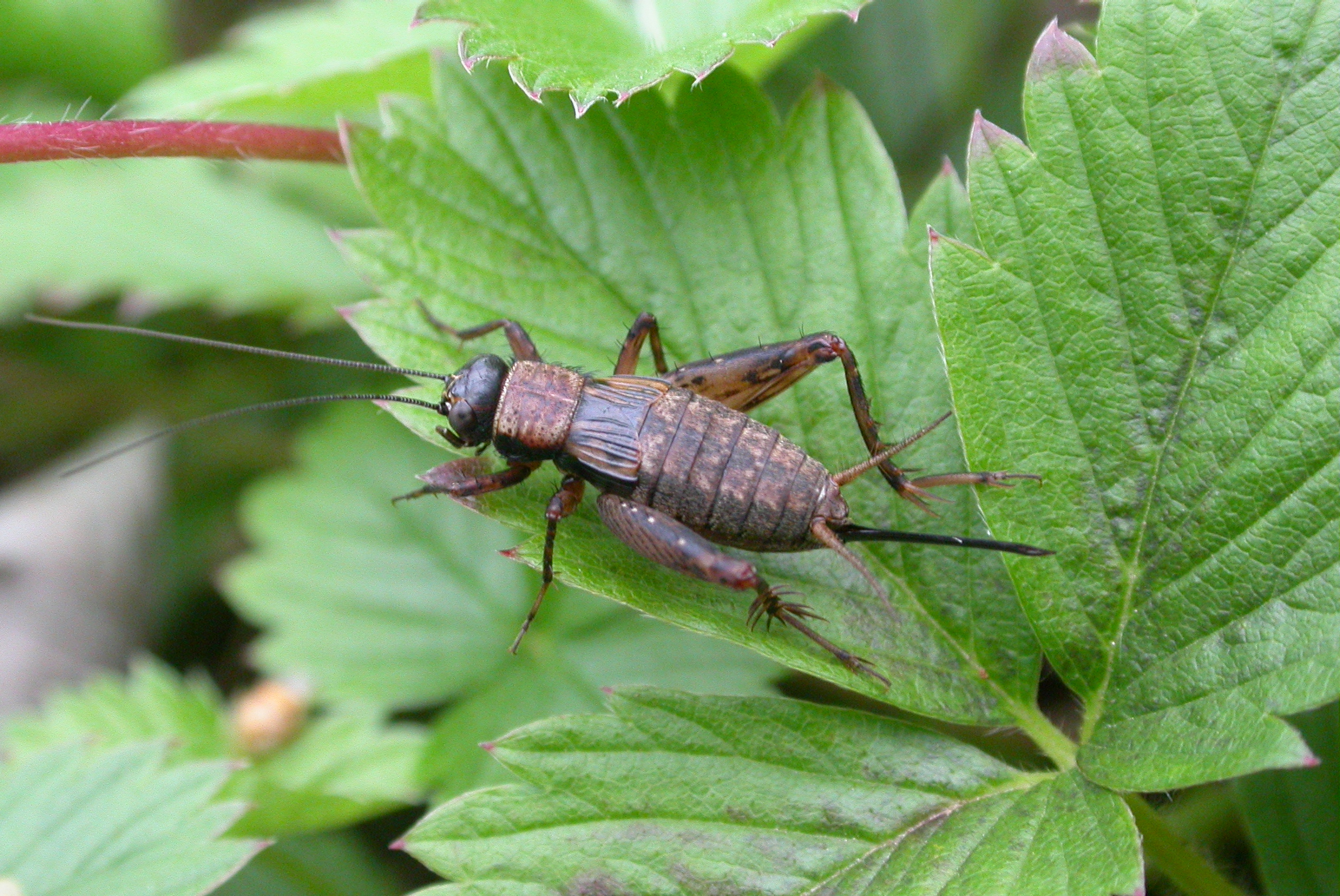
- Female wood cricket

Conservation status
- Least Concern (IUCN 3.1)

Scientific classification
- Kingdom: Animalia
- Phylum: Arthropoda
- Clade: Pancrustacea
- Class: Insecta
- Order: Orthoptera
- Suborder: Ensifera
- Family: Trigonidiidae
- Subfamily: Nemobiinae
- Tribe: Nemobiini
- Genus: Nemobius
- Species: N. sylvestris

Binomial name
- Nemobius sylvestris (Bosc, 1792)

Synonyms
- Acheta sylvestris Bosc, 1792

= Nemobius sylvestris =

Species of cricket

Nemobius sylvestris, the wood cricket, is a flightless species of cricket in the family Trigonidiidae. It is native to Western Europe and North Africa but uncommon in Britain.

== Description ==
This cricket is a small, dark brown, ground-dwelling, grasshopper-like insect with long, thread-like antennae. It grows to about 1 cm (0.4 in). Neither males nor females have hind wings; in males the fore-wings extend half way along the abdomen, while in females, the fore-wings are reduced to rounded stubs. Females also have a long ovipositor at the tip of the abdomen.

== Distribution and habitat ==
The wood cricket is native to Europe and North Africa. Its range includes Western, Central and Southern Europe, Corsica, Algeria and Morocco. The natural habitat of this species is forest edges and woodland clearings, where it is associated with oak, beech, hazel and holly trees and with bracken. It thrives among the leaf litter in warm, sunny spots. It is uncommon in Britain, with three separate populations in the New Forest, the Isle of Wight and southern Devon. In 2001, following the clearance of coniferous woodland and rhododendron from a site near Offwell in eastern Devon, a new population appeared; the nearest previously known population had been around Harpford, some 11 km (7 mi) away. Surrey’s only population of N. sylvestris exists in Wisley Common following their accidental introduction on delivery of azaleas to Wisley Gardens in 1967. Due to the wood cricket's limited range in the UK, it is listed as a species of special conservation concern.

According to a study from 2022, the wood cricket has been recently introduced to North America, making it the first Nemobius species on the continent. Small populations of N. sylvestris have been documented in the states of New York and Washington.

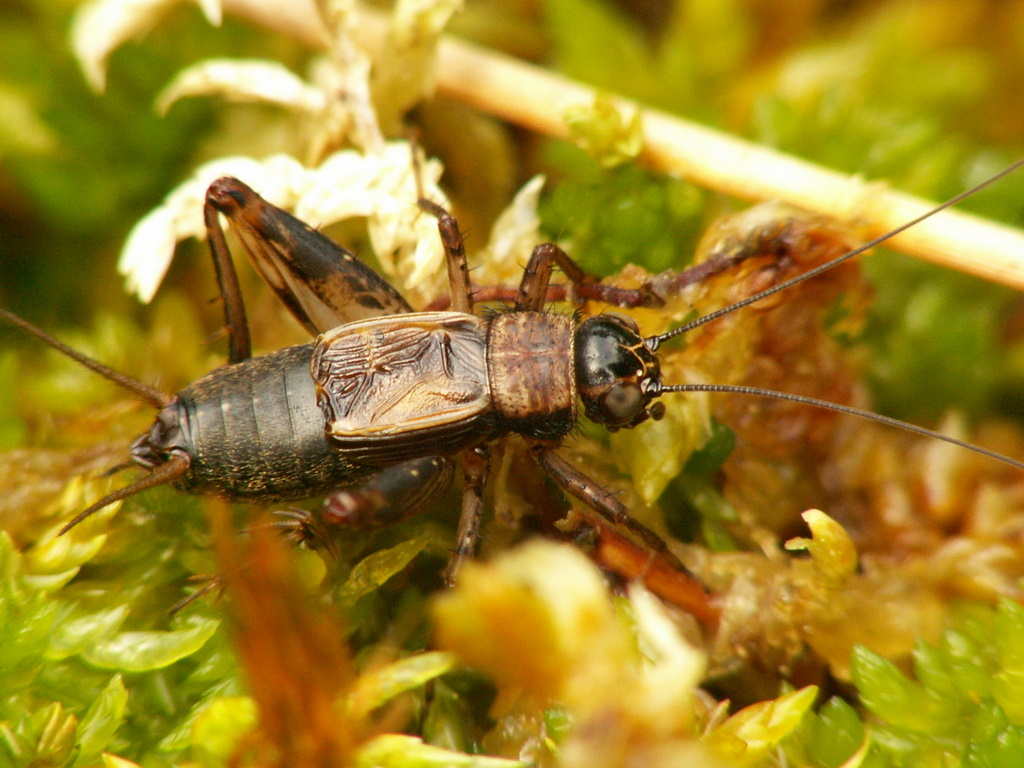
Male wood cricket

Close-up of a Nemobius sylvestris

== Ecology ==
Wood crickets live among the decaying leaf litter on which they feed. They may also consume the fungus growing among the litter. When the weather is hot enough, males stridulate (sing) during both day and night. The loud two tone call is difficult to pinpoint, especially when several are calling in close proximity. When disturbed, these crickets leap away with their powerful back limbs, or hide in the leaf litter or among low vegetation.

Eggs are laid in the leaf litter in summer and autumn and the crickets overwinter as eggs or as nymphs, with the young maturing in June. Unusually for insects in the grasshopper family, wood crickets survive for two years. Being flightless, these crickets are limited in their dispersal abilities; males have been found to disperse over 55 m (180 ft) from the woodland edge but females and nymphs did not move nearly so far. Dispersal along the edge of woodland is more possible.
