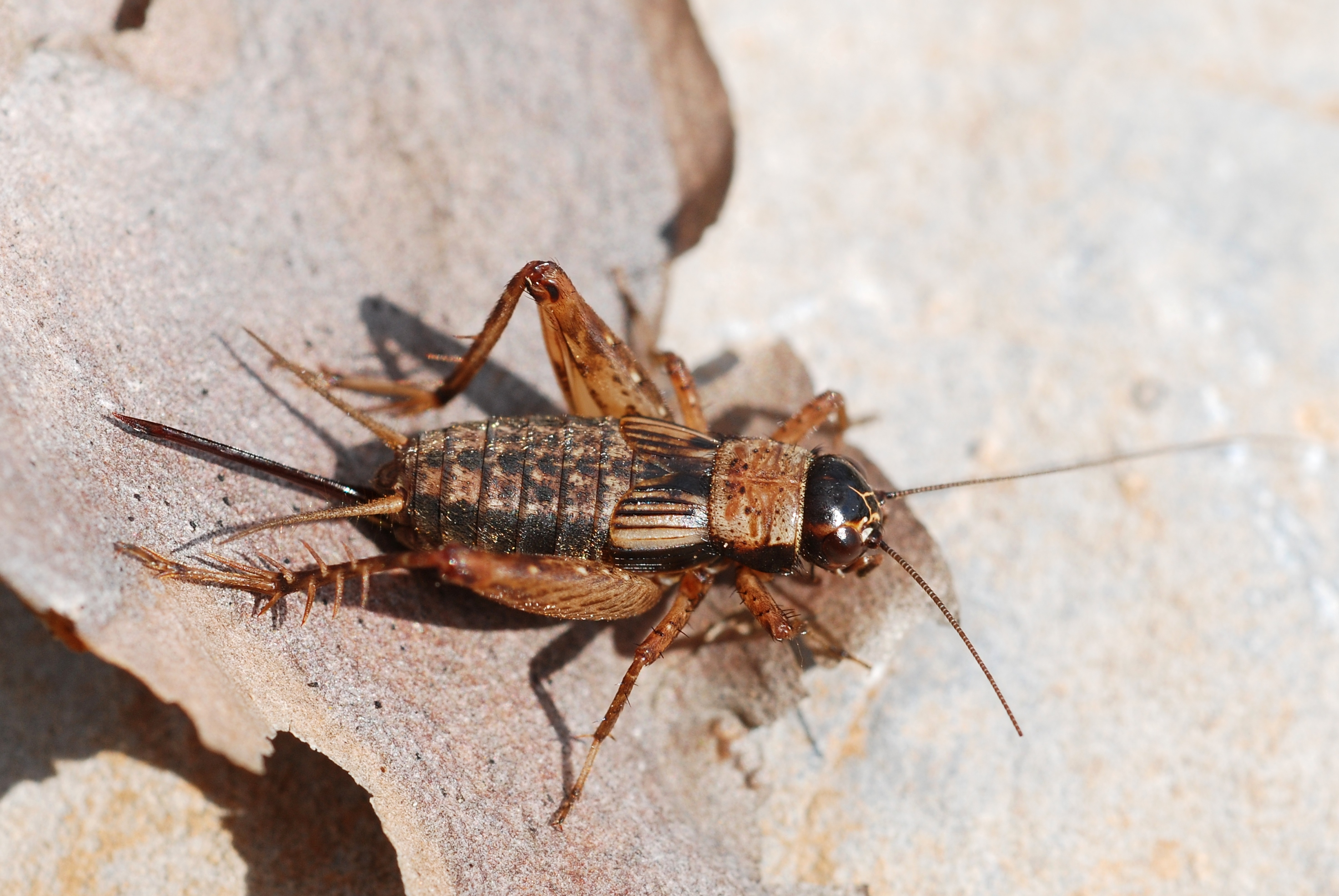
- Nemobius sylvestris female

Scientific classification
- Domain: Eukaryota
- Kingdom: Animalia
- Phylum: Arthropoda
- Class: Insecta
- Order: Orthoptera
- Suborder: Ensifera
- Superfamily: Grylloidea
- Family: Trigonidiidae
- Subfamily: Nemobiinae
- Tribe: Nemobiini
- Genus: Nemobius; Serville, 1838

Synonyms
- Heteronemobius Krauss, 1909; Pantelinus Bolívar, 1921; Pantelius Otte, 1994; Pronemobius Bolívar, 1898

= Nemobius =

Genus of crickets

Nemobius is the type genus of crickets in the subfamily Nemobiinae: called "wood crickets" (UK) or "ground crickets" (US) and now placed in the family Trigonidiidae.

== Species ==
The Orthoptera Species File lists:

1. Nemobius australis Walker, 1869
2. Nemobius grandis Holdhaus, 1909
3. Nemobius interstitialis Barranco, Gilgado & Ortuño, 2013
4. Nemobius karnyi Chopard, 1925
5. Nemobius piracicabae Piza, 1968
6. Nemobius strigipennis Chopard, 1928
7. Nemobius sylvestris (Bosc, 1792) - 2 subspecies:
  type species (as Acheta sylvestris Bosc = N. sylvestris sylvestris)
8. Nemobius varius (Afzelius & Brannius, 1804)
