= Kaumana Cave =

Lava tube in Hawaii

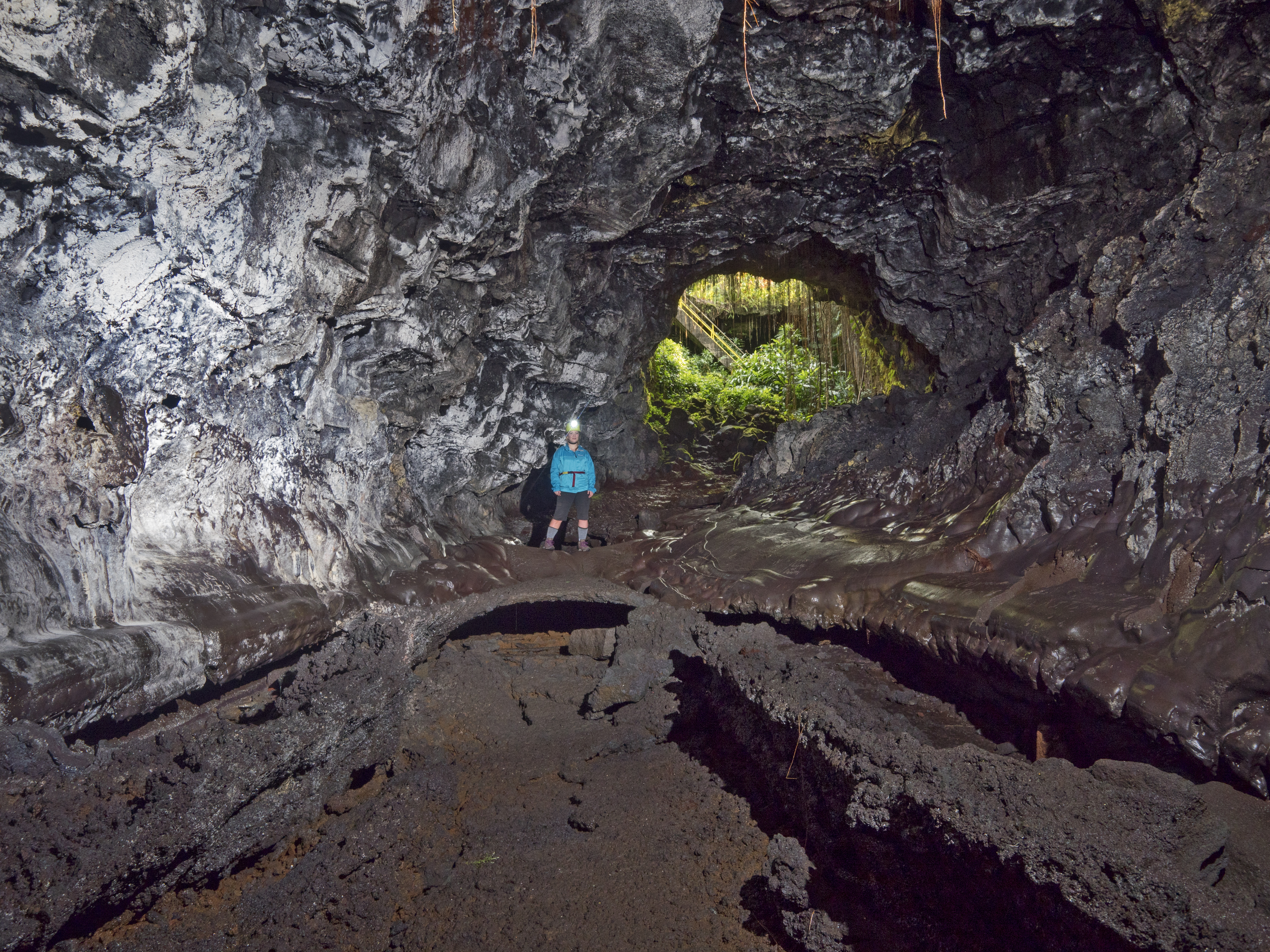
- View upflow in Kaumana Cave towards the main entrance
- Interactive map of Kaumana Cave
- Location: Hawaii County, Hawaii
- Coordinates: 19°41′12.5838″N 155°7′50.8152″W
- Length: 2.026 miles (2197 m)
- Access: Public

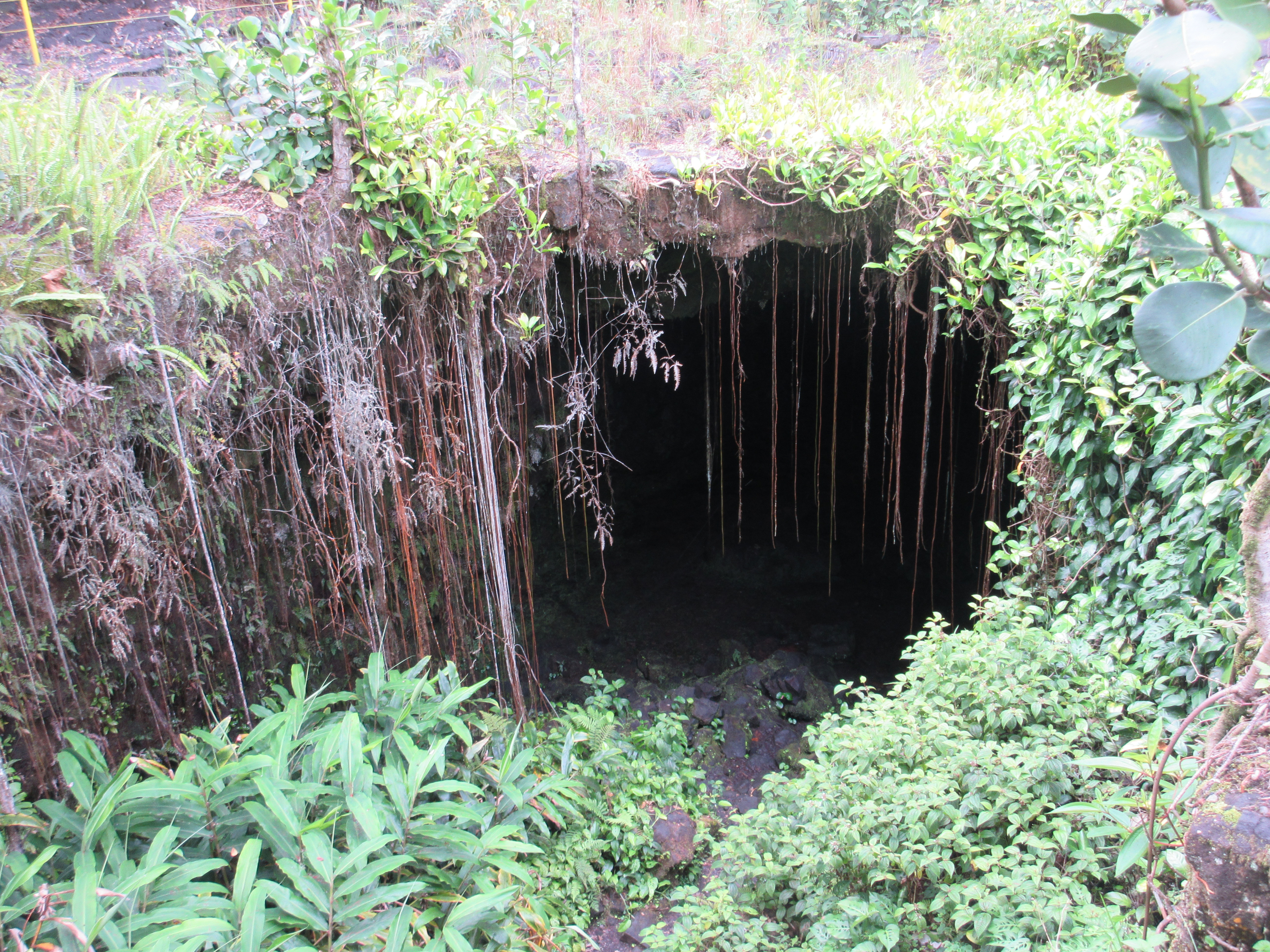
Entrance to the lava tube.

Kaumana Cave is a lava tube created by a 1881 lava flow from Mauna Loa. The tube has been surveyed at 2.026 miles (3260 m) long making it the 57th longest lava tube in the world.

The cave is located on the island of Hawaiʻi near the city of Hilo.

A collapsed skylight provides easy access to two of the tube's entrances which became a tourist attraction. Some parts of the tube are located under private property, and so are some of the entrances.

Many natural features, such as the stalagmites and the stalactites have since been broken off by tourists as souvenirs.

== See also ==
- List of longest caves in the United States
