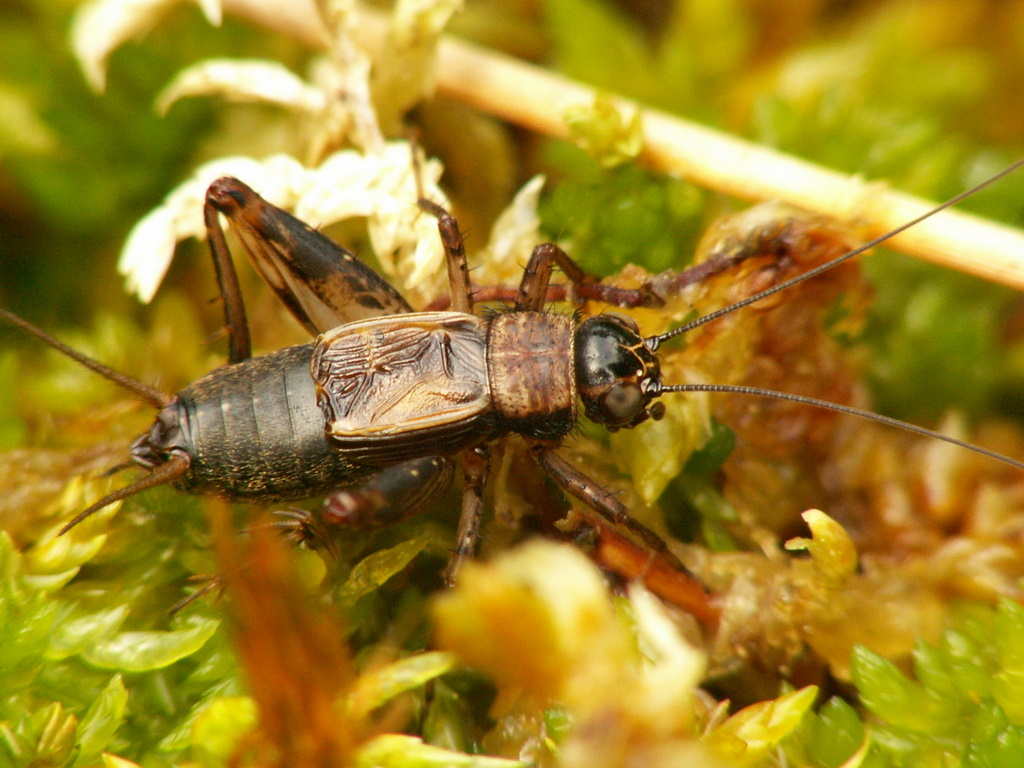
- Nemobius sylvestris

Scientific classification
- Kingdom: Animalia
- Phylum: Arthropoda
- Clade: Pancrustacea
- Class: Insecta
- Order: Orthoptera
- Suborder: Ensifera
- Family: Trigonidiidae
- Subfamily: Nemobiinae; Saussure, 1877

Genera
- See text

= Nemobiinae =

Nemobiinae Temporal range: Aptian–Recent

Subfamily of crickets

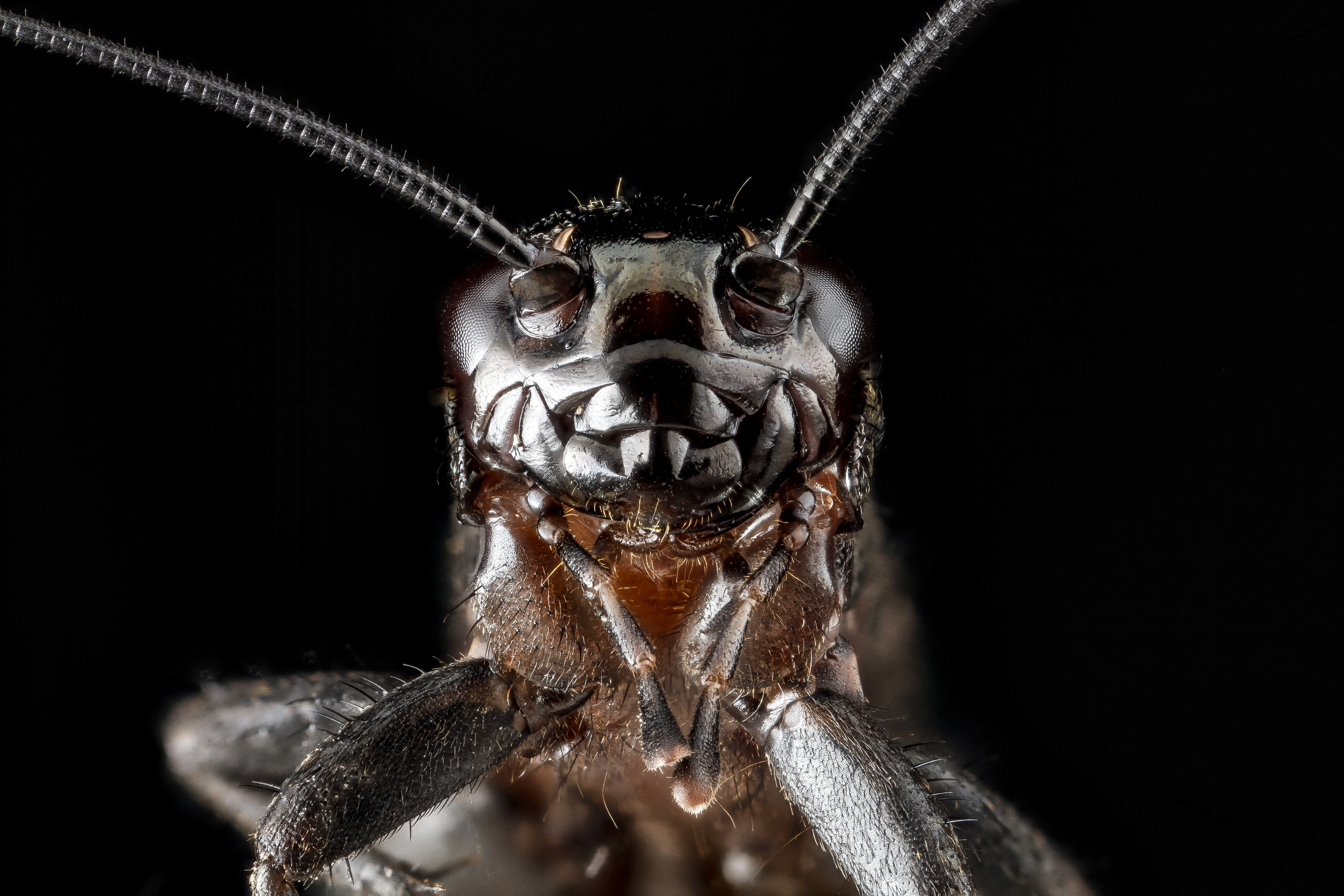
Head of ground cricket

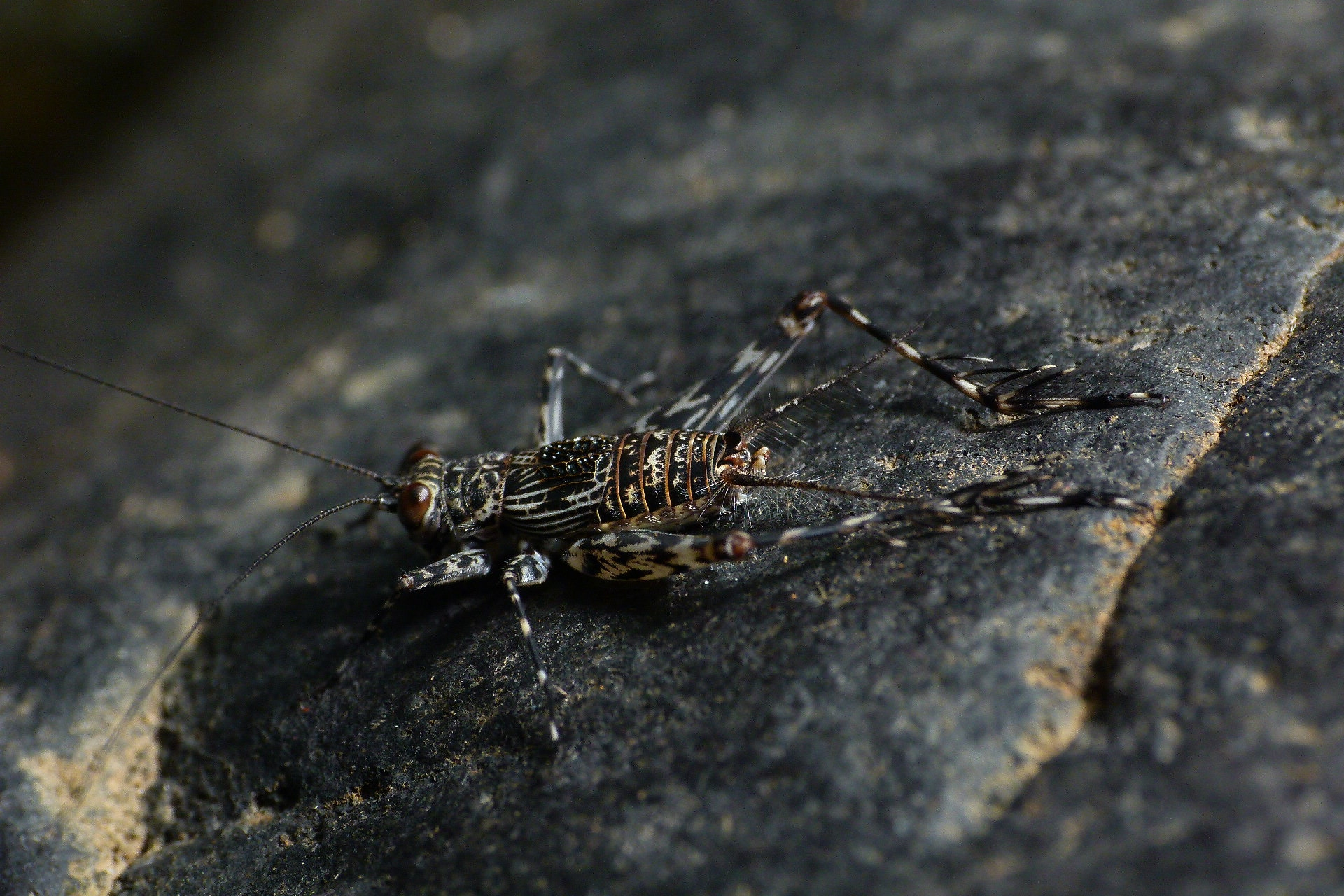
Paranemobius sp.

Nemobiinae is a subfamily of the newly constituted Trigonidiidae, one of the cricket families. The type genus is Nemobius, which includes the wood cricket, but members of this subfamily may also be known as ground crickets or "pygmy field crickets".

== Characteristics ==
Nemobiinae are typically small insects, generally less than 15 mm (0.6 in) long, and less robust than many other crickets (e.g. those in the Gryllidae). The thorax is densely bristled and the abdomen is also bristly. There are four (or sometimes three) pairs of long, movable spines above the tip of the abdomen. The ovipositor varies from being long, straight and needle-like, to short, curved and sabre-like. These crickets have wings of variable lengths and are generally brown, a suitable colour for concealment among the leaf litter and plant bases where they live. They are often active during the day and can be quite common in woodland and pastureland. They are omnivores. There are about two hundred species worldwide.

== Tribes and genera ==
The following tribes and genera are included in subfamily Nemobiinae in the Orthoptera Species File:

=== Burcini ===
Auth: Gorochov, 1986; Horn of Africa, Asia

1. Burcus Gorochov, 1986
2. Gabusibius Hugel & Desutter-Grandcolas, 2021
3. Makalapobius Hugel & Desutter-Grandcolas, 2021
4. Neoburcus Gorochov, 2018
5. Paraburcus Gorochov, 2018
6. Paranemobius Saussure, 1877
7. Speonemobius Chopard, 1924
8. Taiwanemobius Yang & Chang, 1996

=== Grylliscini ===
Auth: Gorochov 1986; central Asia

1. Grylliscus Tarbinsky, 1930

Lissotrachelini

Auth: Hubbell, 1938; distribution: SE Asia

1. Lissotrachelus Brunner von Wattenwyl, 1893^{c g}

=== Marinemobiini ===
Auth: Gorochov 1985; East Asia, Australia and the Pacific: especially litoral environments

1. Apteronemobius Chopard, 1929 - Australia
2. Caconemobius Kirby, 1906
3. Eumarinemobius - monotypic E. sundaicus Gorochov & Tan, 2018
4. Marinemobius Gorochov, 1985
5. Parapteronemobius Furukawa, 1970 - East Asia

=== Nemobiini ===
(synonym: Thetellini Otte & Alexander 1983)
Auth: Saussure 1877; South America, Europe, Africa, Asia (limited), Australia and the Pacific

1. Amonemobius Otte, 1987
2. Austronemobius Hegg, 2024
3. Bobilla Otte & Alexander, 1983
4. Bullita Gorochov, 1986
5. Caledonina Desutter-Grandcolas, 2016
6. Calperum Rentz & Su, 1996
7. Dictyonemobius Chopard, 1951
8. Ignambina Otte, 1987
9. Ionemobius Otte, 1987
10. Koghiella Otte, 1987
11. Leptonemobius Sjöstedt, 1917
12. Monopteropsis de Mello & Jacomini, 1994
13. Mutonemobius Hegg, 2024
14. Nambungia Otte & Alexander, 1983
15. Nemobius Serville, 1838
16. Orintia Gorochov, 1986
17. Paniella Otte, 1987
18. Pepoapua Jesus & Pereira, 2017
19. Silvinella Otte & Alexander, 1983
20. Specnia Otte & Alexander, 1983
21. Tahitinemobius Gorochov, 1986
22. Territirritia Rentz & Su, 1996
23. Thetella Otte & Alexander, 1983
24. Tincanita Otte & Alexander, 1983

=== Pteronemobiini ===
Auth: Vickery, 1973, worldwide distribution

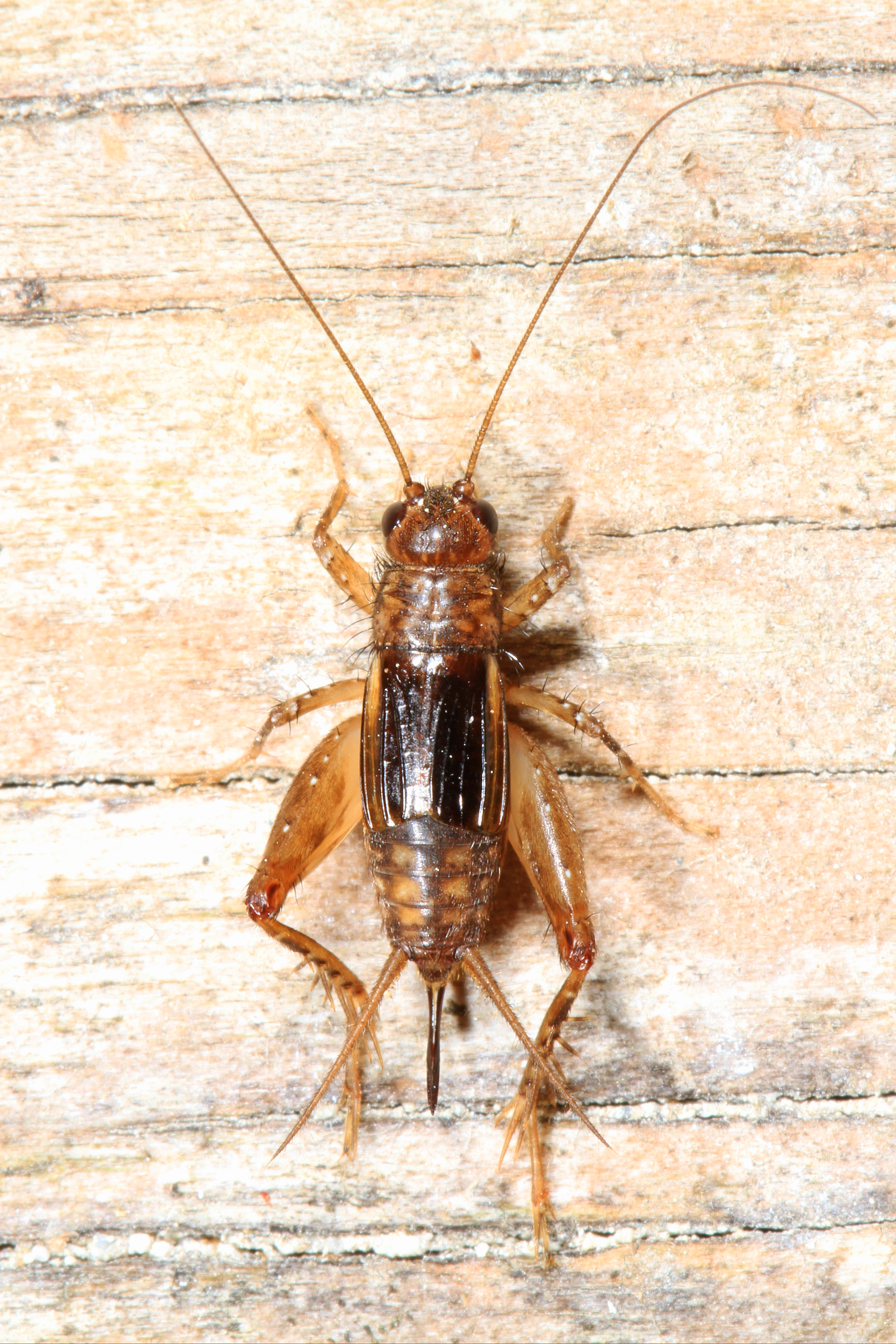
Allonemobius sp.

1. Allonemobius Hebard, 1913
2. Amanayara de Mello & Jacomini, 1994
3. Argizala Walker, 1869
4. Dianemobius Vickery, 1973
5. Eunemobius Hebard, 1913
6. Kevanemobius Bolfarini & de Mello, 2012
7. Marcelonemobius Cadena-Castañeda, Rodríguez & Navarrete-Heredia, 2019
8. Narellina Otte, 1994
9. Neonemobius Hebard, 1913
10. Pepoyara de Mello & Capellari, 2012
11. Phoremia Desutter-Grandcolas, 1993
12. Pictonemobius Vickery & Johnstone, 1970
13. Polionemobius Gorochov, 1983
14. Pteronemobius Jacobson, 1904
15. Stenonemobius Gorochov, 1981

=== Incertae sedis ===
- Absonemobius Desutter-Grandcolas, 1993
- †Baltonemobius Gorochov, 2010 Baltic amber, Eocene
- †Birmaninemobius Xu et al., 2020 Burmese amber, Myanmar, Cenomanian
- Calperum Rentz & Su, 1996
- Cophonemobius Chopard, 1929
- Cophoscottia Chopard, 1951
- Homonemobius Chopard, 1935
- Hygronemobius Hebard, 1913
- Kanakinemobius Desutter-Grandcolas, 2016
- †Liaonemobius Ren 1998 Yixian Formation, China, Aptian
- Micronemobius Ingrisch, 1987
- Ngamarlanguia Rentz & Su, 1996
- Paora gusevae Gorochov, 1986 - monotypic genus from New Caledonia
- Pineronemobius Yong, 2018
- Scottiola Uvarov, 1940
- Sudanicus Werner, 1913
- Tahitina Hebard, 1935
- Taiwanemobius Yang & Chang, 1996
- Territirritia Rentz & Su, 1996
- Zucchiella de Mello, 1990
