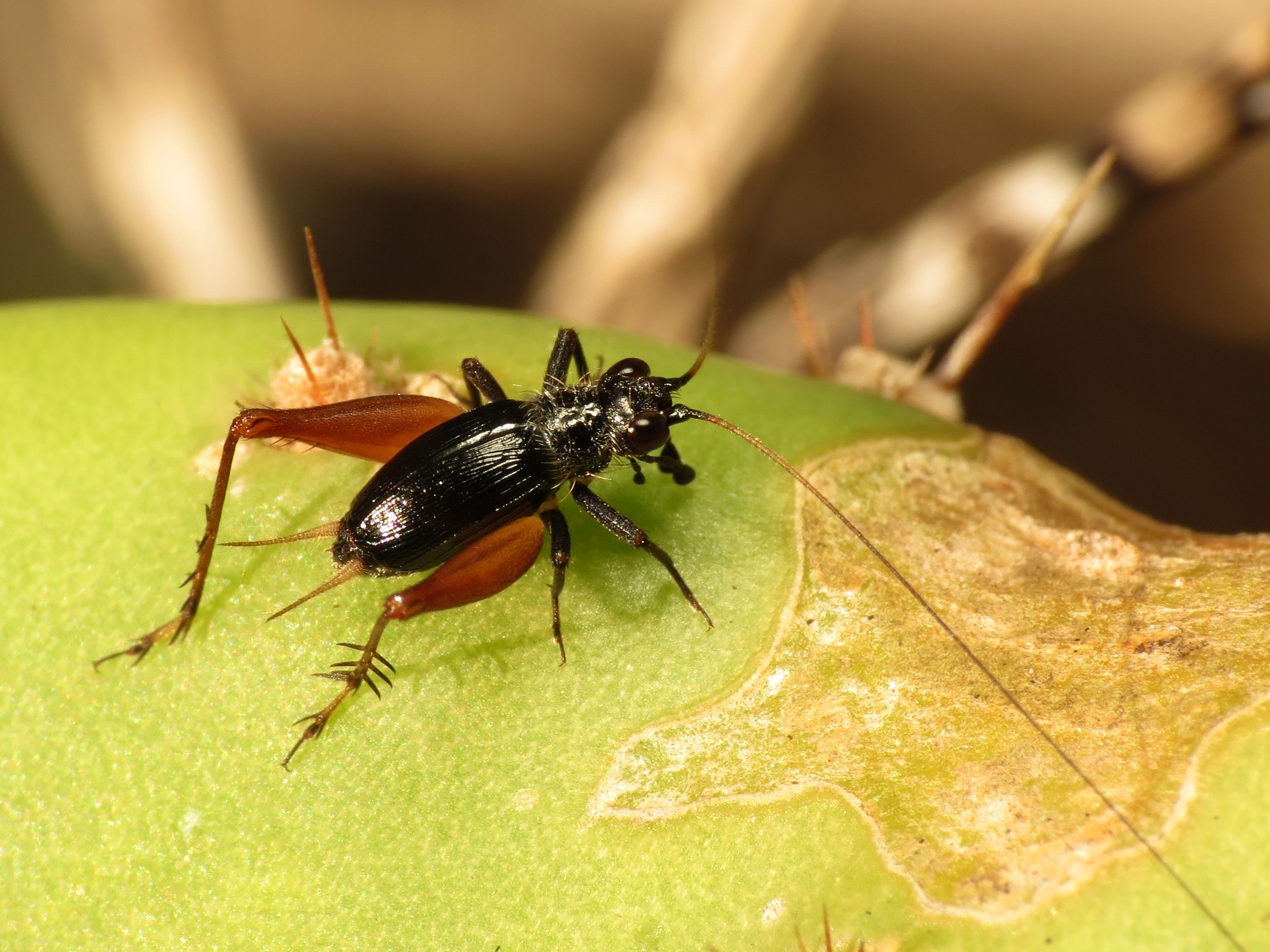
- Trigonidium cicindeloides
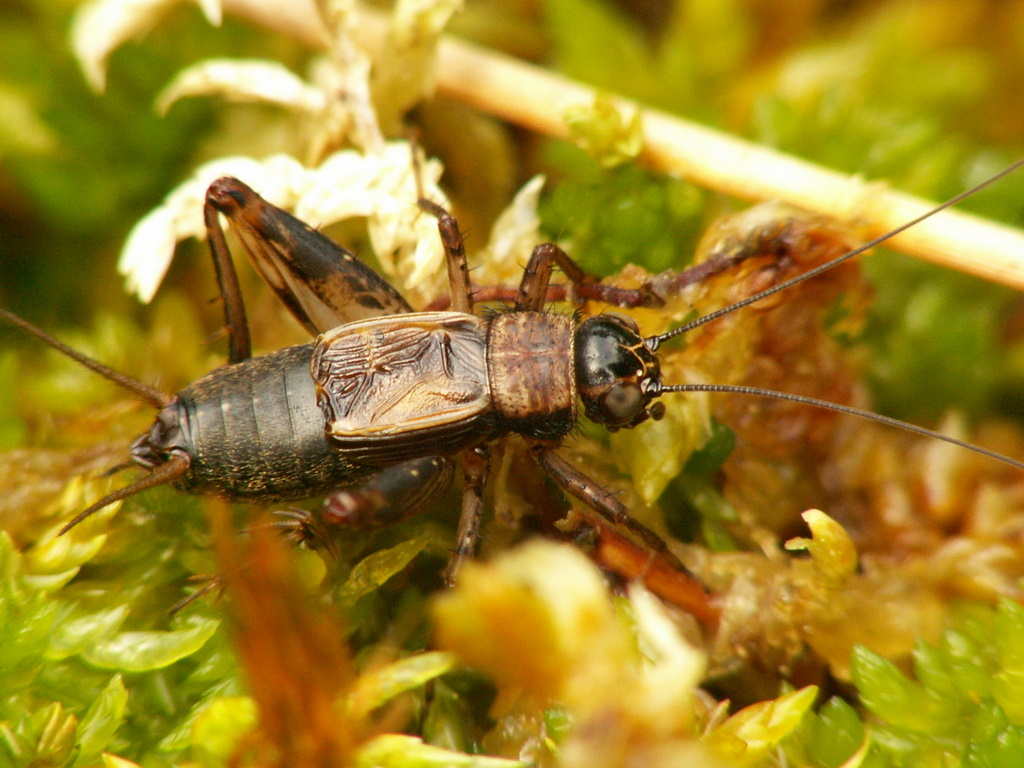
- Nemobius sylvestris (male)

Scientific classification
- Domain: Eukaryota
- Kingdom: Animalia
- Phylum: Arthropoda
- Class: Insecta
- Order: Orthoptera
- Suborder: Ensifera
- Superfamily: Grylloidea
- Family: Trigonidiidae; Saussure, 1874

Synonyms
- Nemobiidae Saussure, 1877; Nemobiites Saussure, 1877

= Trigonidiidae =

Family of crickets

The Trigonidiidae are a family of crickets consisting of two subfamilies:

- Subfamily Nemobiinae Saussure, 1877 – wood crickets or ground crickets
- Subfamily Trigonidiinae Saussure, 1874 – sword-tail crickets
