= Anaxipha delicatula =

Scientific classification
- Domain: Eukaryota
- Kingdom: Animalia
- Phylum: Arthropoda
- Class: Insecta
- Order: Orthoptera
- Suborder: Ensifera
- Family: Trigonidiidae
- Tribe: Trigonidiini
- Genus: Anaxipha
- Species: A. delicatula

Binomial name
- Anaxipha delicatula (Scudder, 1878)

Species of cricket

Anaxipha delicatula, the chirping trig, is a species of winged bush crickets, trigs in the family Trigonidiidae. It is found in North America.
