= Svistella =

Scientific classification
- Kingdom: Animalia
- Phylum: Arthropoda
- Class: Insecta
- Order: Orthoptera
- Suborder: Ensifera
- Family: Trigonidiidae
- Subfamily: Trigonidiinae
- Tribe: Trigonidiini
- Genus: Svistella; Gorochov, 1987

Genus of crickets

Svistella is an Asian genus of "sword-tail crickets", in the subfamily Trigonidiinae and has now been assigned to the tribe Trigonidiini.

== Species ==
Svistella species are recorded from: Japan, Korea, China, Vietnam, Peninsular Malaysia and Sumatra. The Orthoptera Species File lists:

1. Svistella anhuiensis He, Li & Liu, 2009
2. Svistella argentata Ma, Jing & Zhang, 2019
3. Svistella bifasciata (Shiraki, 1911) - type species (as Paratrigonidium bifasciatum Shiraki)
4. Svistella cangshanensis Ma & Tao, 2025
5. Svistella chekjawa Tan & Robillard, 2012
6. Svistella dubia (Liu & Yin, 1993)
7. Svistella fallax He, Li & Liu, 2009
8. Svistella fuscoterminata He & Liu, 2018
9. Svistella malu He, 2021
10. Svistella prominens Ma, Yuan & Gu, 2025
11. Svistella rufonotata (Chopard, 1932)
12. Svistella wuyong He, 2021
13. Svistella yayun He, 2024
