= Laupala =

Luapula may refer to:

- The Luapula River: the transnational river in central Africa
- a synonym of Nudilla, a genus of crickets
