= Zudella grande =

Scientific classification
- Kingdom: Animalia
- Phylum: Arthropoda
- Class: Insecta
- Order: Orthoptera
- Suborder: Ensifera
- Family: Trigonidiidae
- Genus: Zudella
- Species: Z. grande

Binomial name
- Zudella grande (Perkins, 1899)

Synonyms
- Paratrigonidium grande Perkins, 1899; Trigonidium grande (Perkins, 1899)

Species of cricket

Zudella grande is a cricket in the subfamily Trigonidiinae ("winged bush crickets, trigs"), endemic to the island of Hawaii.
