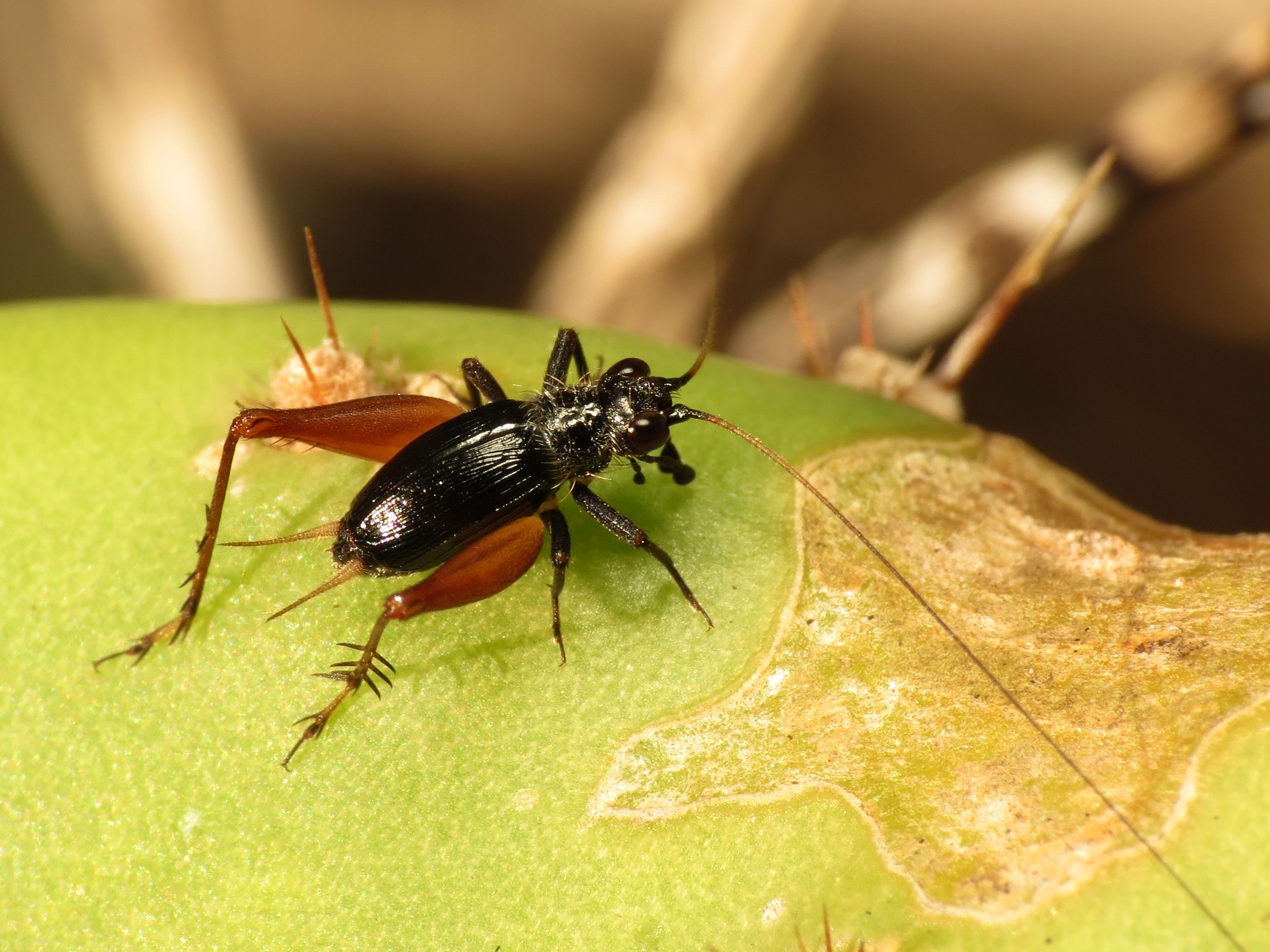
- Trigonidium cicindeloides

Conservation status
- Least Concern (IUCN 3.1) (Europe regional assessment)

Scientific classification
- Kingdom: Animalia
- Phylum: Arthropoda
- Class: Insecta
- Order: Orthoptera
- Suborder: Ensifera
- Family: Trigonidiidae
- Subfamily: Trigonidiinae
- Tribe: Trigonidiini
- Genus: Trigonidium
- Species: T. cicindeloides

Binomial name
- Trigonidium cicindeloides Rambur, 1838

Synonyms
- Trigonidium paludicola Serville, 1838; Trigonidium coleoptratum Stål, 1861; Trigonidium tibiale Stål, 1861; Scleropterus ater Walker, 1869; Trigonidium madecassum Saussure, 1878; Piestoxiphus simiolus Karsch, 1893

= Trigonidium cicindeloides =

Species of cricket

Trigonidium cicindeloides is a species of sword-tail cricket widespread in Africa, southern Europe, Asia, and Arabia. During mating season males make a sound created by vibrating the last two joints of their maxillary palpi. This is either to attract females for mating or to drive off other males.
