= Metioche (disambiguation) =

Metioche is a daughter of Orion in Greek mythology.

Metioche may also refer to:

- Metioche (cricket), a genus of cricket
- Metioche, a Trojan captive who may or may not have been a child of Priam
