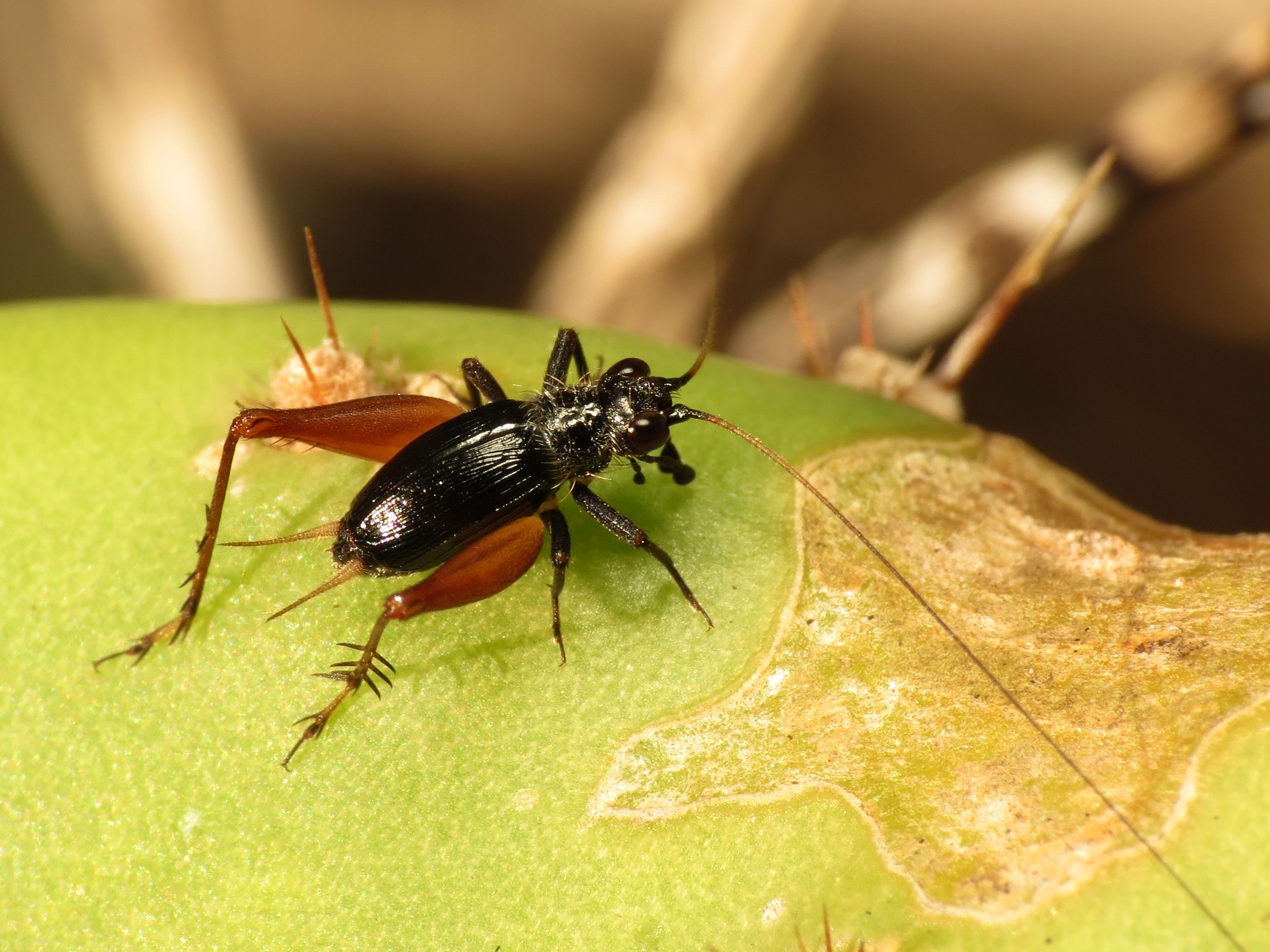
- Trigonidium cicindeloides

Scientific classification
- Kingdom: Animalia
- Phylum: Arthropoda
- Clade: Pancrustacea
- Class: Insecta
- Order: Orthoptera
- Suborder: Ensifera
- Family: Trigonidiidae
- Subfamily: Trigonidiinae
- Tribe: Trigonidiini
- Genus: Trigonidium; Rambur, 1838

Synonyms
- for subgenus Trigonidium: Alamia Serville, 1838; Ceratinopterus Fieber, 1853

= Trigonidium (cricket) =

Genus of crickets

Trigonidium is a large genus of sword-tail crickets, typical of the tribe Trigonidiini. Records of occurrence are from Europe, Africa, tropical Asia, Australia and the Pacific islands; many species endemic to Pacific islands including Hawaii have now been placed in the genus Nudilla.

== Subgenera and species ==
The Orthoptera Species File currently lists five subgenera:

subgenus Balamara

Auth: Otte & Alexander, 1983 - Australia

1. Trigonidium albovittatum (Chopard, 1951)
2. Trigonidium gidya (Otte & Alexander, 1983)
3. Trigonidium marroo (Otte & Alexander, 1983)

subgenus Metioche Stål, 1877

- Trigonidium (Metioche) vittaticolle Stål, 1861

subgenus Parametioche Otte & Alexander, 1983

1. Trigonidium rectinerve (Chopard, 1951) - Australia

subgenus Superstes Hugel, 2012

1. Trigonidium payendeei Hugel, 2012
2. Trigonidium superba Hugel, 2012

=== subgenus Trigonidium ===
Auth: Rambur, 1838 - Europe, Africa, Asia, Australia, Pacific islands (synonyms: Trigonidium (Alamia) Serville, 1838, Trigonidomorpha Chopard, 1925)

1. Trigonidium ahiu Otte, 1994
2. Trigonidium albarum Ma, Yuan & Gu, 2025
3. Trigonidium ammonga (Otte & Alexander, 1983)
4. Trigonidium armarina Otte & Alexander, 1983
5. Trigonidium australianum (Chopard, 1925)
6. Trigonidium basilewskyi (Chopard, 1955)
7. Trigonidium brevipenne Saussure, 1899
8. Trigonidium bundilla Otte & Alexander, 1983
9. Trigonidium canara Otte & Alexander, 1983
10. Trigonidium canberrae Otte & Alexander, 1983
11. Trigonidium cicindeloides Rambur, 1838 - type species
12. Trigonidium erythrocephalum (Walker, 1869)
13. Trigonidium fuscifrons (Chopard, 1936)
14. Trigonidium goobita Otte & Alexander, 1983
15. Trigonidium guineense (Saussure, 1878)
16. Trigonidium humbertianum (Saussure, 1878)
17. Trigonidium infuscatum (Chopard, 1925)
18. Trigonidium inopinum Otte & Cowper, 2007
19. Trigonidium japonicum Ichikawa, 2001
20. Trigonidium killawarra Otte & Alexander, 1983
21. Trigonidium kundui (Bhowmik, 1971)
22. Trigonidium lalwinya Otte & Alexander, 1983
23. Trigonidium lineatifrons (Chopard, 1935)
24. Trigonidium maoricum (Walker, 1869)
25. Trigonidium meekappa Otte & Alexander, 1983
26. Trigonidium nigripes Yuan, Ma & Gu, 2022
27. Trigonidium nigritum (Saussure, 1899)
28. Trigonidium novarae (Saussure, 1878)
29. Trigonidium obscuripenne (Chopard, 1957)
30. Trigonidium pallidipenne (Chopard, 1962)
31. Trigonidium pallipes (Chopard, 1938)
32. Trigonidium parinerve (Chopard, 1925)
33. Trigonidium pubescens (Chopard, 1954)
34. Trigonidium rubellonigrum Gorochov, 1987
35. Trigonidium rubrumoculum He & Ma, 2022
36. Trigonidium solis Tan, Baroga-Barbecho & Yap, 2019
37. Trigonidium vittatum (Chopard, 1954)
