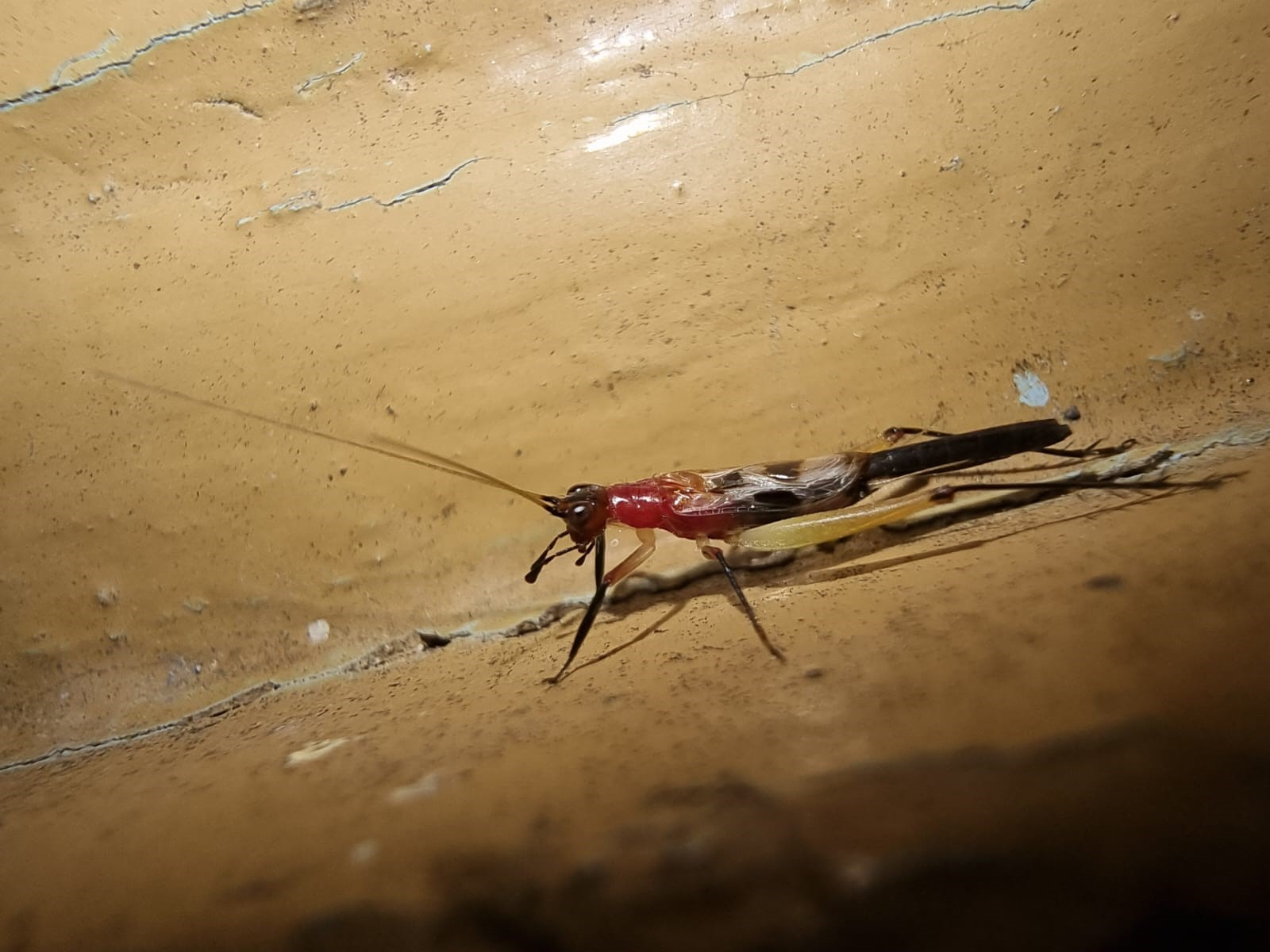
- Homoeoxipha lycoides

Scientific classification
- Kingdom: Animalia
- Phylum: Arthropoda
- Class: Insecta
- Order: Orthoptera
- Suborder: Ensifera
- Family: Trigonidiidae
- Subfamily: Trigonidiinae
- Tribe: Trigonidiini
- Genus: Homoeoxipha; Saussure, 1874

Synonyms
- Homoeoxiphus Saussure, 1878

= Homoeoxipha =

Genus of crickets

Homoeoxipha is a genus of "sword-tail crickets", in the subfamily Trigonidiinae and the tribe Trigonidiini.

== Species ==
Species are recorded from tropical Africa and in Asia: India, China, Japan, Indochina, Malesia through to Australia. The Orthoptera Species File lists:

1. Homoeoxipha amoena Bolívar, 1914
2. Homoeoxipha eurylobus Ma, Liu & Zhang, 2016
3. Homoeoxipha fuscipennis Chopard, 1927
4. Homoeoxipha gracilis Chopard, 1967
5. Homoeoxipha histeriformis (Bolívar, 1914)
6. Homoeoxipha lycoides (Walker, 1869) - type species (as Phyllopalpus lycoides Walker)
7. Homoeoxipha nigriceps Chopard, 1962
8. Homoeoxipha nigripennis Chopard, 1967
9. Homoeoxipha nigripes Xia & Liu, 1993
10. Homoeoxipha obliterata (Caudell, 1927)
11. Homoeoxipha oscillantenna He, 2021
12. Homoeoxipha thoracica (Chopard, 1915)
