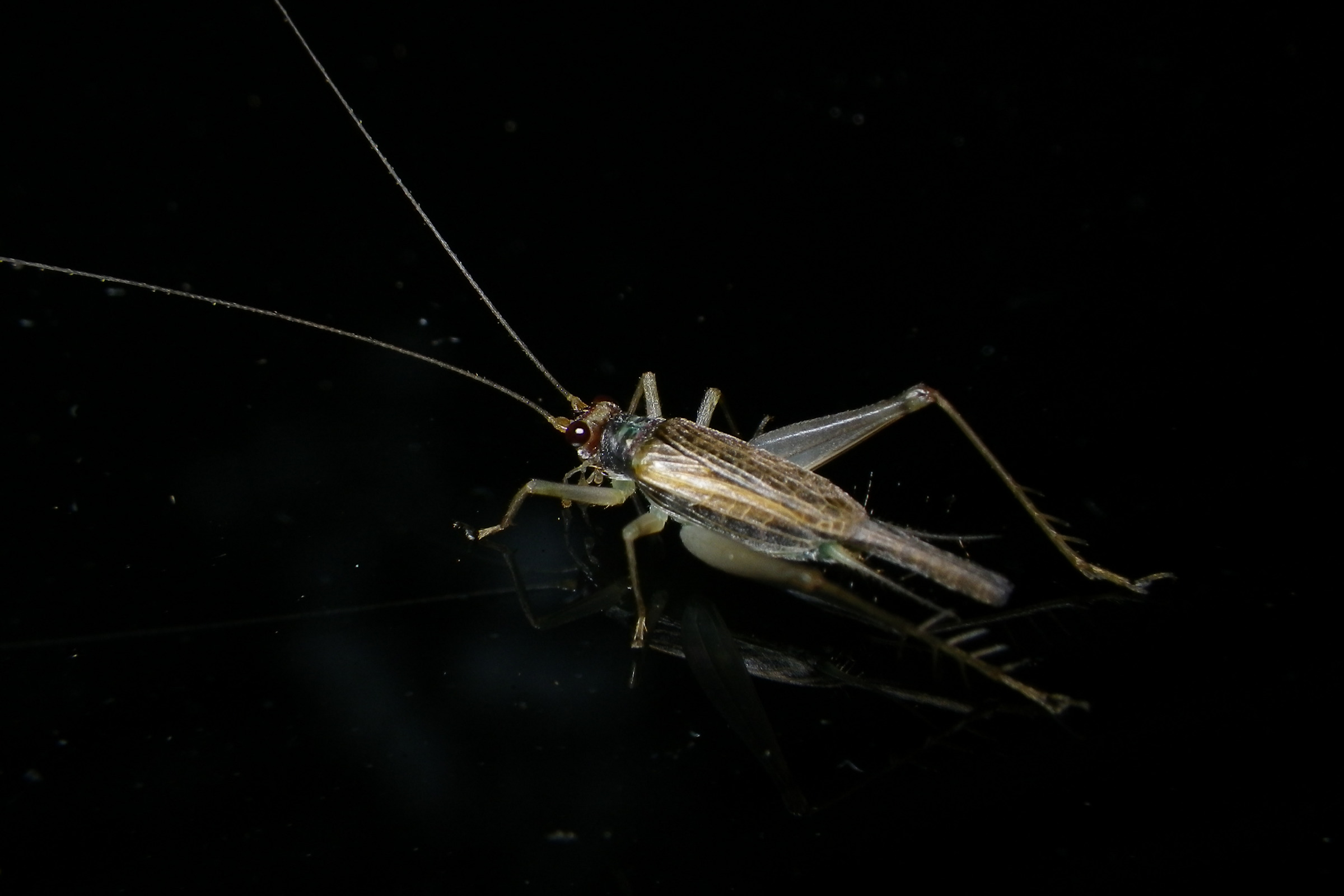
- Metiochodes genji

Scientific classification
- Kingdom: Animalia
- Phylum: Arthropoda
- Class: Insecta
- Order: Orthoptera
- Suborder: Ensifera
- Family: Trigonidiidae
- Subfamily: Trigonidiinae
- Tribe: Trigonidiini
- Genus: Metiochodes; Chopard, 1932

= Metiochodes =

Genus of crickets

Metiochodes is an Asian genus of "sword-tail crickets", in the subfamily Trigonidiinae and the tribe Trigonidiini.

== Species ==
Metiochodes species are recorded from: Angola, Sri Lanka, the Andaman islands, southern China, Vietnam, Malesia and Australia (distribution is probably incomplete). The Orthoptera Species File lists:

1. Metiochodes acutiparamerus Li, He & Liu, 2010
2. Metiochodes annulicercis Chopard, 1962
3. Metiochodes australicus Chopard, 1951
4. Metiochodes flavescens Chopard, 1932 - type species
5. Metiochodes fulvus Chopard, 1940
6. Metiochodes gracilus Ma & Pan, 2019
7. Metiochodes greeni Chopard, 1925
8. Metiochodes karnyi Chopard, 1930
9. Metiochodes minor Li, He & Liu, 2010
10. Metiochodes ornatus Chopard, 1969
11. Metiochodes platycephalus Chopard, 1940
12. Metiochodes polycomus Ma & Tao, 2025
13. Metiochodes sikkimensis Bhowmik, 1968
14. Metiochodes striatus Bhowmik, 1970
15. Metiochodes thankolomara Otte & Alexander, 1983
16. Metiochodes tianfuensis Ma, Yuan & Gu, 2023
17. Metiochodes tibeticus Li, He & Liu, 2010
18. Metiochodes tindalei Chopard, 1951
19. Metiochodes trilineatus Chopard, 1936
20. Metiochodes truncatus Li, He & Liu, 2010
21. Metiochodes wanzhii Ma & Tao, 2025

Note: Metiochodes denticulatus Liu & Shi, 2011 has been moved to genus Flospes Ma & He, 2022
