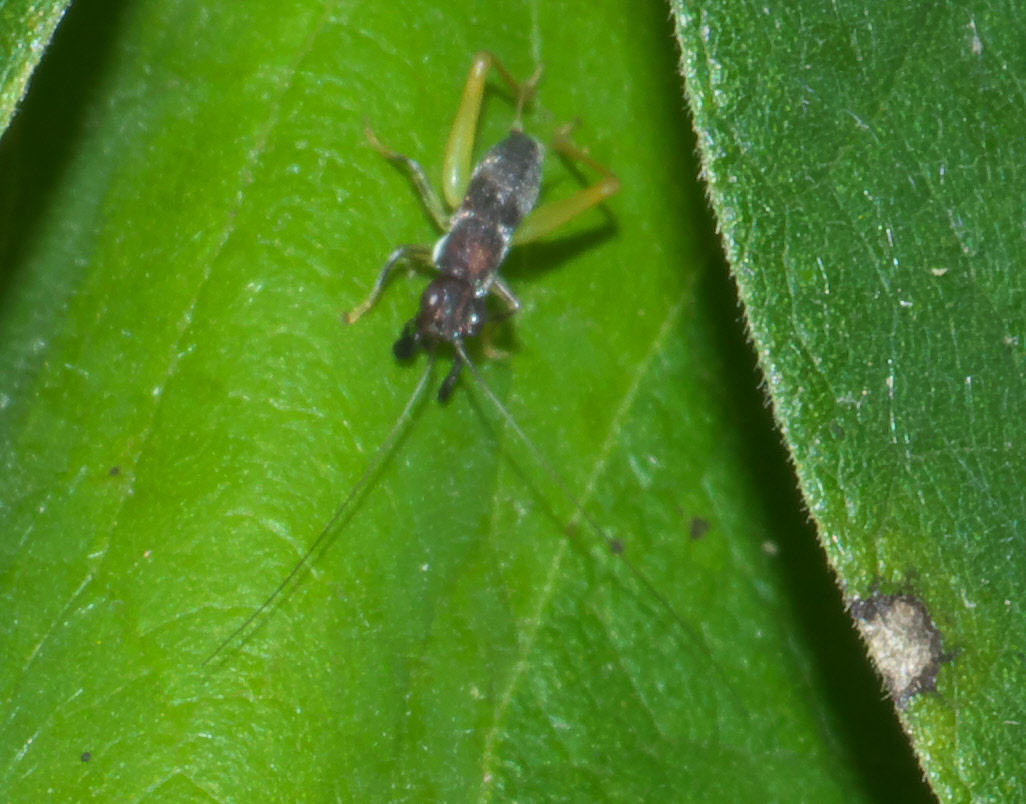
- Phyllopalpus pulchellus

Scientific classification
- Domain: Eukaryota
- Kingdom: Animalia
- Phylum: Arthropoda
- Class: Insecta
- Order: Orthoptera
- Suborder: Ensifera
- Family: Trigonidiidae
- Subfamily: Trigonidiinae
- Tribe: Phylloscyrtini
- Genus: Phyllopalpus; Uhler, 1864

= Phyllopalpus =

Genus of crickets

Phyllopalpus is a genus of winged bush crickets, trigs in the family Trigonidiidae. There are about six described species in Phyllopalpus.

== Species ==
These six species belong to the genus Phyllopalpus:

- Phyllopalpus batesii Kirby, W.F., 1906^{c g}
- Phyllopalpus brunnerianus (Saussure, 1874)^{c g}
- Phyllopalpus caeruleus (Saussure, 1874)^{c g}
- Phyllopalpus nigrovarius Walker, F., 1869^{c g}
- Phyllopalpus pulchellus Uhler, 1864^{i c g b} (handsome trig)
- Phyllopalpus pulcher Walker, F., 1869^{c g}

Data sources: i = ITIS, c = Catalogue of Life, g = GBIF, b = Bugguide.net
