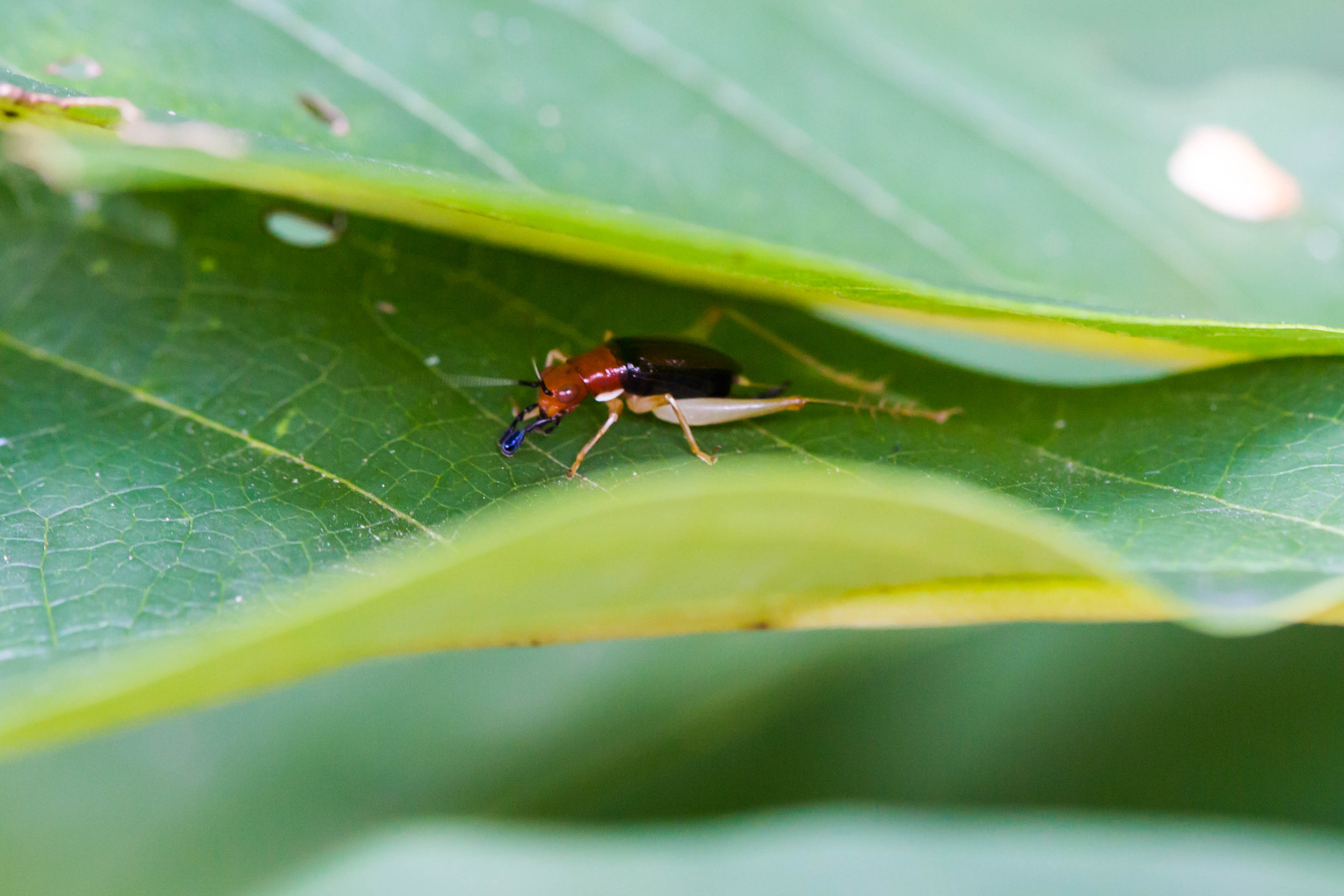
- Phyllopalpus pulchellus

Scientific classification
- Kingdom: Animalia
- Phylum: Arthropoda
- Clade: Pancrustacea
- Class: Insecta
- Order: Orthoptera
- Suborder: Ensifera
- Family: Trigonidiidae
- Subfamily: Trigonidiinae
- Tribe: Phylloscyrtini; Choppard, 1968

Genera
- Cranistus; Phyllopalpus; Phylloscyrtus

= Phylloscyrtini =

Species of cricket-like animal

The Phylloscyrtini tribe is a group of 21 species of small crickets in the New World, from the eastern United States to Argentina. Little is known about their biology.

The group is characterized by the long maxillary palpi, flattened and widened in the last segment, as well as the tarsal adhesive pads, used to walk on the underside of leaves. Despite their size (less than 10 mm), the striking colors make them easily recognizable.

They prefer humid and lush habitats, and their reported diet is omnivorous.

== Genera and species ==
- Cranistus Stål, 1861
  - Cranistus bolivianus Hebard, 1931
  - Cranistus burmeisteri Hebard, 1931
  - Cranistus canotus (Saussure, 1878)
  - Cranistus colliurides Stål, 1861
  - Cranistus macilentus (Saussure, 1878)
  - Cranistus setosus (Burmeister, 1880)
  - Cranistus similis (Bruner, 1916)
- Phyllopalpus Uhler, 1864
  - Phyllopalpus batesii Kirby, 1906
  - Phyllopalpus brunnerianus (Saussure, 1874)
  - Phyllopalpus caeruleus (Saussure, 1874)
  - Phyllopalpus nigrovarius Walker, 1869
  - Phyllopalpus pulchellus Uhler, 1864
  - Phyllopalpus pulcher Walker, 1869
- Phylloscyrtus Guérin-Méneville, 1844
  - Phylloscyrtus amoenus Burmeister, 1880
  - Phylloscyrtus cicindeloides Gerstaecker, 1863
  - Phylloscyrtus elegans Guérin-Méneville, 1844
  - Phylloscyrtus intermedius Hebard, 1928
  - Phylloscyrtus rehni Costa Lima, 1958
  - Phylloscyrtus trinotatus Hebard, 1928
  - Phylloscyrtus viridicatus (Saussure, 1897)
  - Phylloscyrtus vittatus Gerstaecker, 1863
