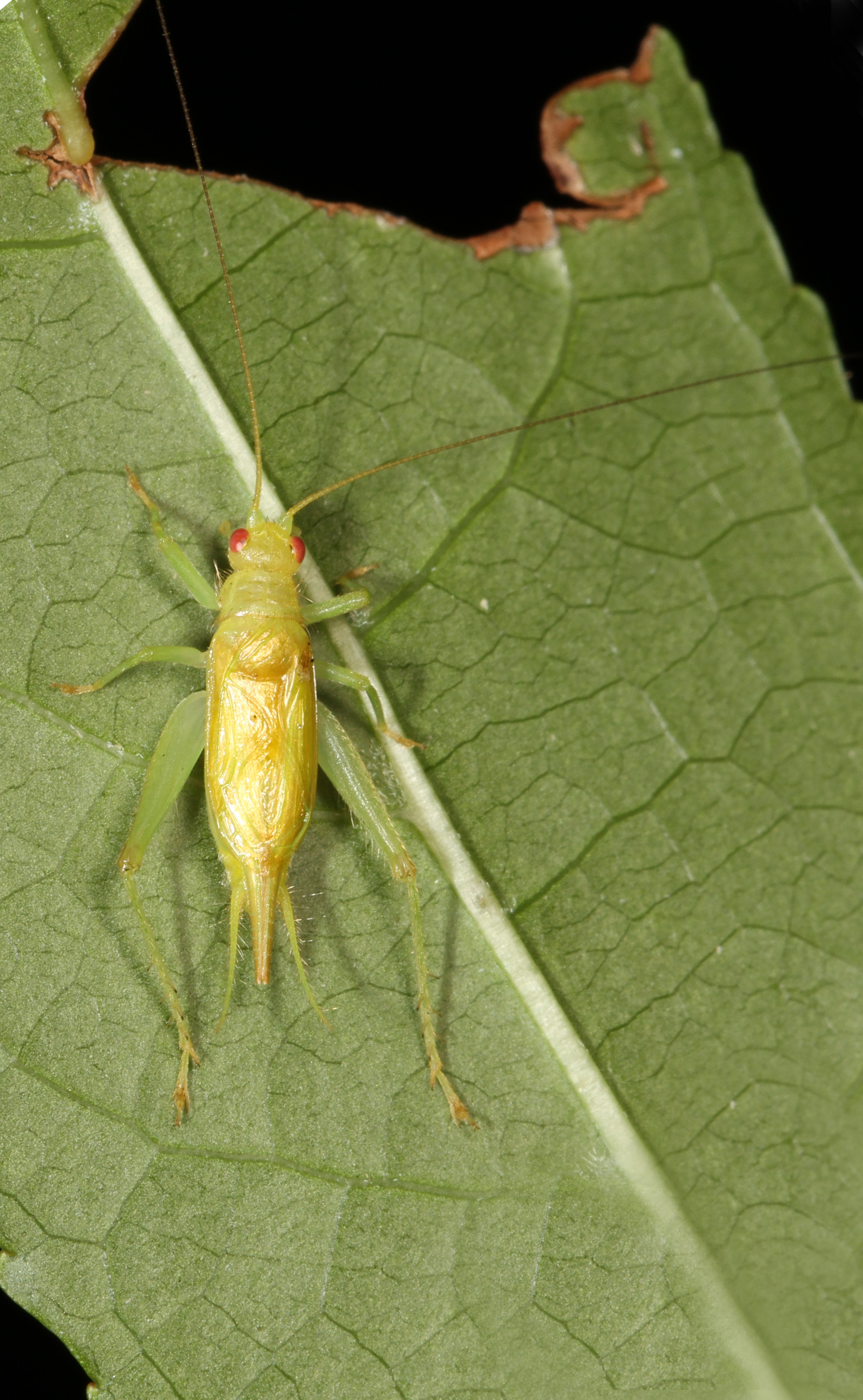

Scientific classification
- Domain: Eukaryota
- Kingdom: Animalia
- Phylum: Arthropoda
- Class: Insecta
- Order: Orthoptera
- Suborder: Ensifera
- Family: Trigonidiidae
- Genus: Cyrtoxipha
- Species: C. columbiana

Binomial name
- Cyrtoxipha columbiana Caudell, 1907

= Cyrtoxipha columbiana =

Species of cricket

Cyrtoxipha columbiana, the Columbian trig, is a species of cricket in the family Trigonidiidae (the winged bush crickets, or “trigs”). It is endemic to most of the southeastern United States, up to New Jersey, although sightings are also reported from further north, including New York and Massachusetts.
