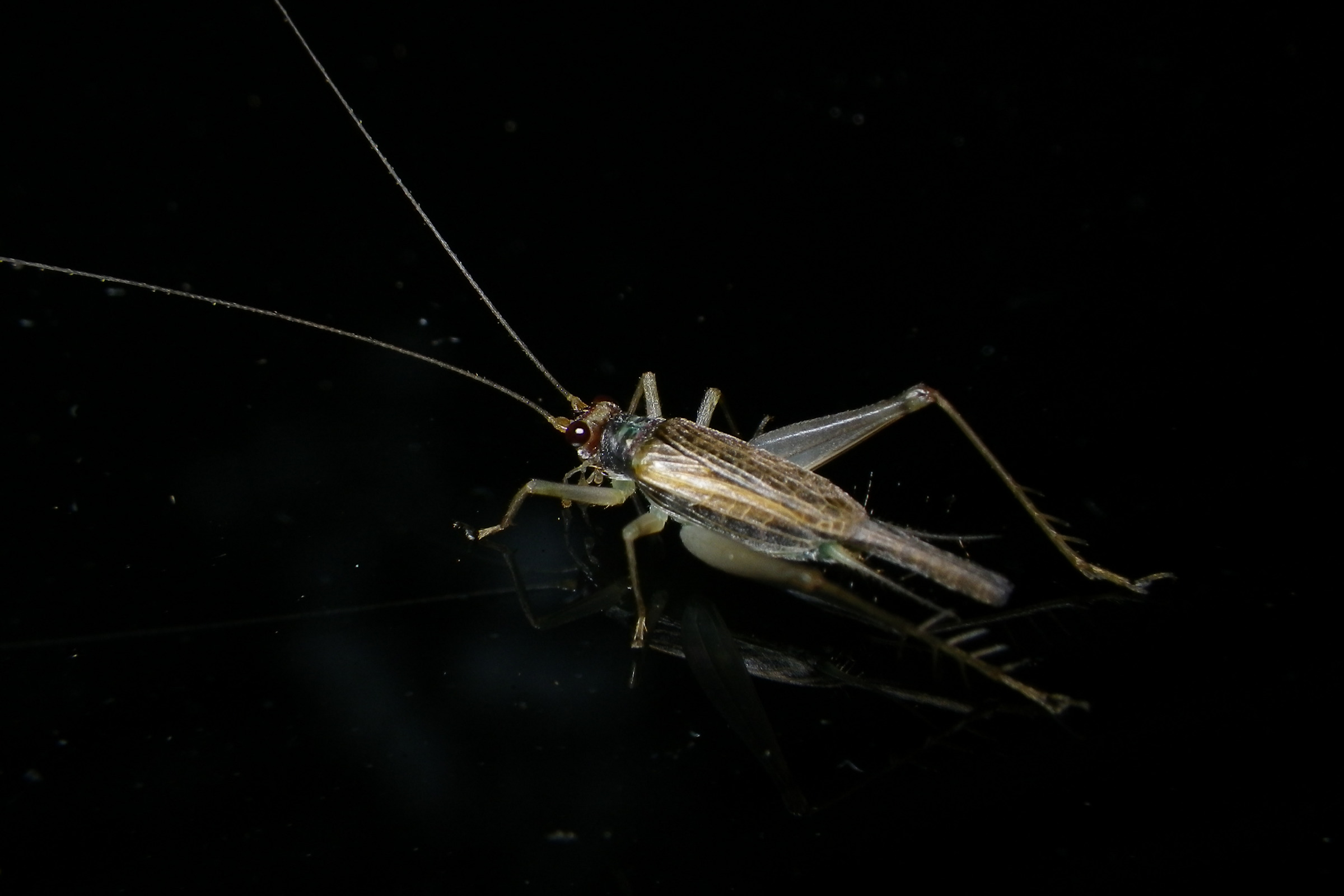
- Amusurgus (Usgmona) genji

Scientific classification
- Domain: Eukaryota
- Kingdom: Animalia
- Phylum: Arthropoda
- Class: Insecta
- Order: Orthoptera
- Suborder: Ensifera
- Family: Trigonidiidae
- Subfamily: Trigonidiinae
- Tribe: Trigonidiini
- Genus: Amusurgus; Brunner von Wattenwyl, 1893

Synonyms
- Paranaxipha Chopard, 1925

= Amusurgus =

Genus of crickets

External image
- Images at iNaturalist

Amusurgus is a genus of Asian "sword-tail crickets", in the subfamily Trigonidiinae and the tribe Trigonidiini, erected by Carl Brunner von Wattenwyl in 1893. Species records exist for Pakistan through to Japan, South-East Asia through to Australia (distribution is probably incomplete).

== Species ==
The Orthoptera Species File lists:

subgenus Amusurgus Brunner von Wattenwyl, 1893

1. †Amusurgus africanus Chopard, 1936
2. Amusurgus angustus (Chopard, 1925)
3. Amusurgus bispinosus He, Li, Fang & Liu, 2010
4. Amusurgus caerulus Tan, 2022
5. Amusurgus fascifrons Chopard, 1951
6. Amusurgus fulvus Brunner von Wattenwyl, 1893 - type species
7. Amusurgus hackeri (Chopard, 1951)
8. Amusurgus kanyakis Otte & Alexander, 1983
9. Amusurgus maculatus Chopard, 1927
10. Amusurgus minmirri Otte & Alexander, 1983
11. Amusurgus mubboonis Otte & Alexander, 1983
12. Amusurgus nilarius Otte & Alexander, 1983
13. Amusurgus noorundi Otte & Alexander, 1983
14. Amusurgus oedemeroides (Walker, 1871)
15. Amusurgus ornatipes (Chopard, 1925)
16. Amusurgus speculifer Chopard, 1936
17. Amusurgus tinka Otte & Alexander, 1983
18. Amusurgus unicolor (Chopard, 1925)
19. Amusurgus xanthoneurus (Chopard, 1940)

subgenus Usgmona Furukawa, 1970

1. Amusurgus excavatus Liu, Shi & Zhou, 2015
2. Amusurgus genji (Furukawa, 1970)
