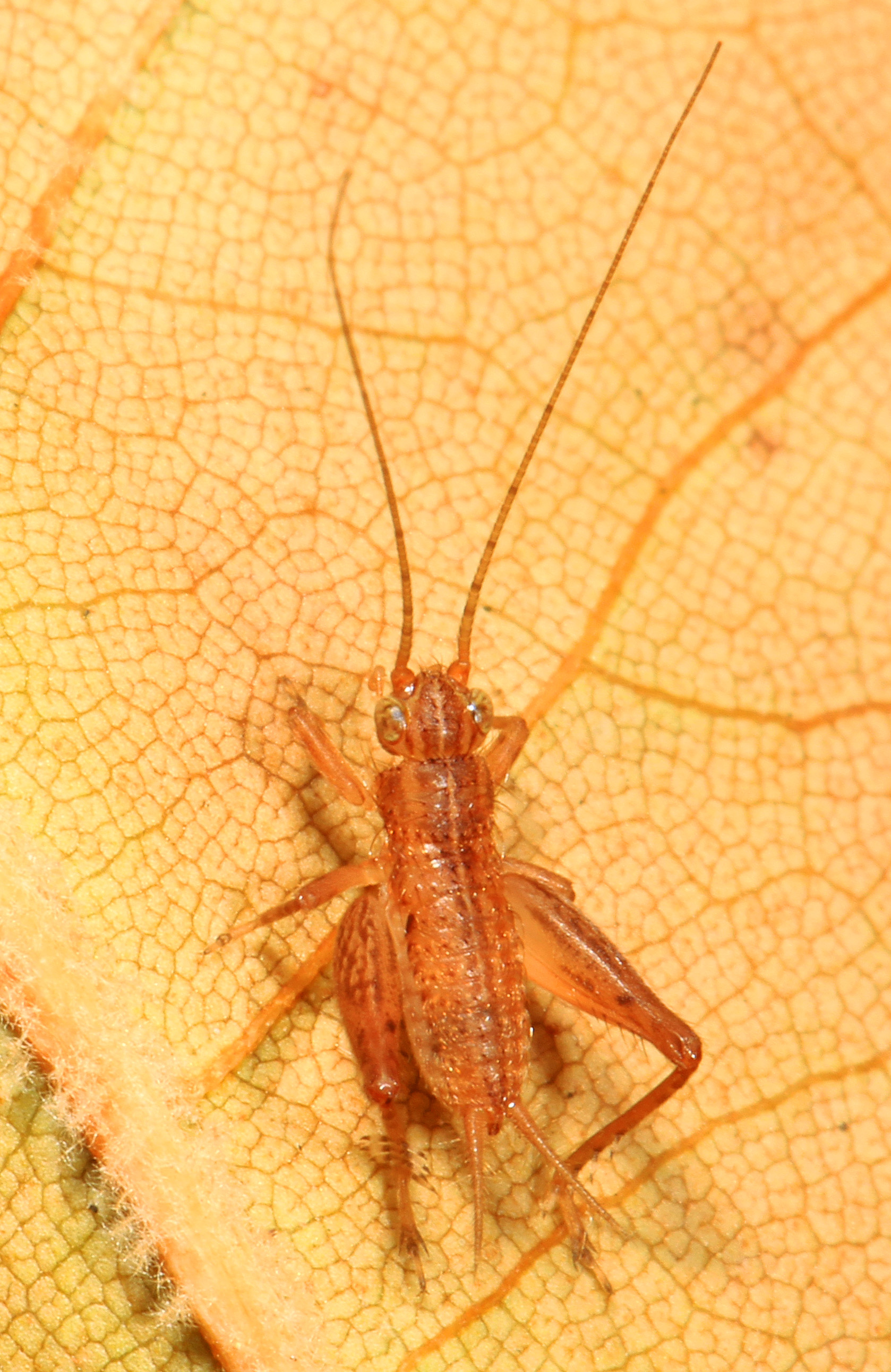
- Falcicula hebardi

Scientific classification
- Kingdom: Animalia
- Phylum: Arthropoda
- Class: Insecta
- Order: Orthoptera
- Suborder: Ensifera
- Family: Trigonidiidae
- Subfamily: Trigonidiinae
- Tribe: Trigonidiini
- Genus: Falcicula; Rehn, 1903
- Species: F. hebardi

Binomial name
- Falcicula hebardi Rehn, 1903

= Falcicula =

Genus of crickets

Falcicula is a genus of winged bush crickets, or trigs, in the family Gryllidae, containing the single species Falcicula hebardi.

Common names for Falcicula hebardi are "Hebard's trig" and "Hebard's bush cricket". It is found in North America.
