= Trigonidium vittaticolle =

Scientific classification
- Kingdom: Animalia
- Phylum: Arthropoda
- Clade: Pancrustacea
- Class: Insecta
- Order: Orthoptera
- Suborder: Ensifera
- Family: Trigonidiidae
- Genus: Trigonidium
- Species: T. vittaticolle

Binomial name
- Trigonidium vittaticolle Stål, 1861

Synonyms
- Metioche vittaticollis (Stål, 1861)

Species of cricket

Trigonidium (Metioche) vittaticolle, the silent leaf-runner cricket or silent leaf runner, is a species of cricket in the subgenus Metioche, recorded from SE Asia, Australia and the Pacific islands.

The species is 10 mm long. It feeds on little insects like planthoppers and leafhoppers.
