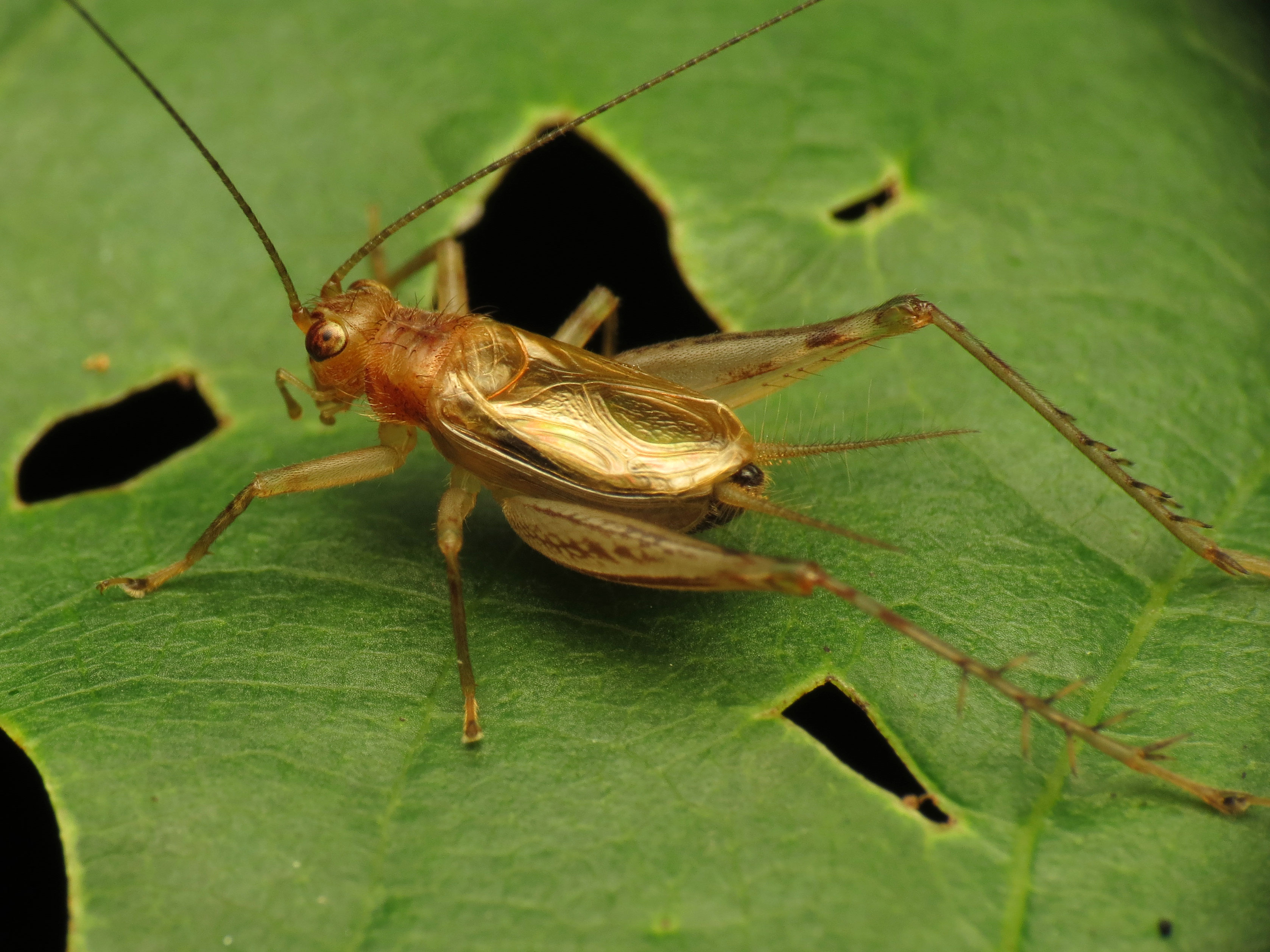

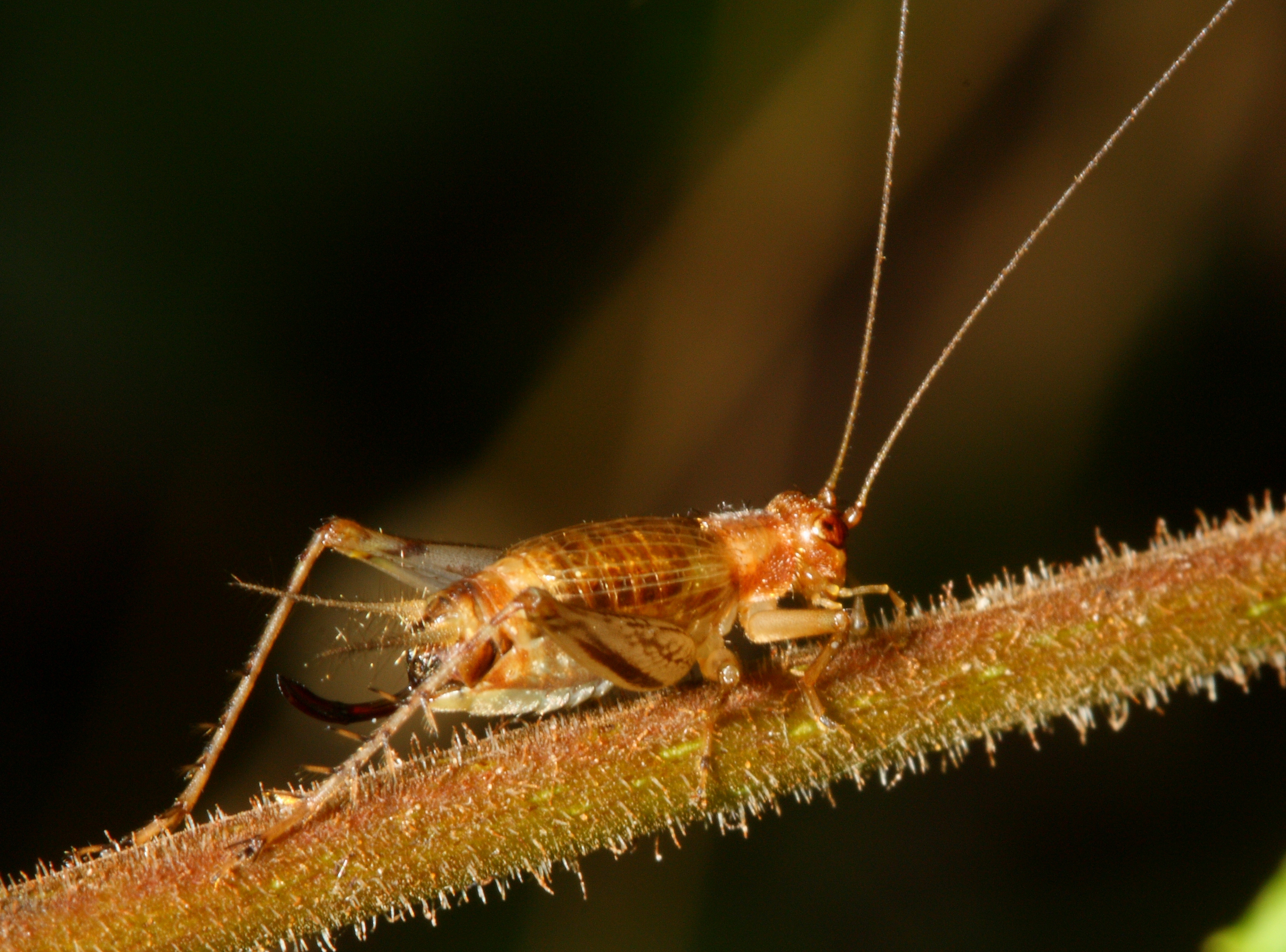
- Anaxipha exigua

Scientific classification
- Domain: Eukaryota
- Kingdom: Animalia
- Phylum: Arthropoda
- Class: Insecta
- Order: Orthoptera
- Suborder: Ensifera
- Family: Trigonidiidae
- Subfamily: Trigonidiinae
- Tribe: Trigonidiini
- Genus: Anaxipha; Saussure, 1874

Synonyms
- Anaxiphus Saussure, 1878

= Anaxipha =

Genus of crickets

Anaxipha is a genus of brown sword-tail cricket from tropical areas in the Americas, Africa, Asia, Australia and western Pacific islands.

== Species ==
- Anaxipha adventicia Otte, 2006
- Anaxipha agaea Otte, 2006
- Anaxipha ainigma Otte & Perez-Gelabert, 2009
- Anaxipha allardi Chopard, 1956
- Anaxipha allotria Otte, 2006
- Anaxipha amica Otte & Perez-Gelabert, 2009
- Anaxipha angusticollis (Saussure, 1874)
- Anaxipha annulipes Hebard, 1924
- Anaxipha antictypos Otte & Perez-Gelabert, 2009
- Anaxipha antidupos Otte & Perez-Gelabert, 2009
- Anaxipha aphaura Otte & Perez-Gelabert, 2009
- Anaxipha apseudes Otte & Perez-Gelabert, 2009
- Anaxipha arena Otte & Perez-Gelabert, 2009
- Anaxipha armstrongi Chopard, 1929
- Anaxipha athanes Otte & Perez-Gelabert, 2009
- Anaxipha atrifrons (Bruner, 1916)
- Anaxipha beccarii Salfi, 1935
- Anaxipha bicoloripes Chopard, 1954
- Anaxipha bifasciata Chopard, 1927
- Anaxipha biroi Chopard, 1927
- Anaxipha bradephona Desutter-Grandcolas, 2000
- Anaxipha bredoi Chopard, 1948
- Anaxipha brevipennis Chopard, 1957
- Anaxipha brevis Chopard, 1958
- Anaxipha bryani Chopard, 1929
- Anaxipha buxtoni Chopard, 1929
- Anaxipha caicos Otte & Perez-Gelabert, 2009
- Anaxipha caledonica Otte, 1987
- Anaxipha calusa Walker & Funk, 2014
- Anaxipha cayennensis (Saussure, 1897)
- Anaxipha championi (Saussure, 1897)
- Anaxipha charitopis Otte & Perez-Gelabert, 2009
- Anaxipha chichimeca (Saussure, 1878)
- Anaxipha ciliata (Afzelius & Brannius, 1804)
- Anaxipha concolor (Chopard, 1917)
- Anaxipha conomeru Otte & Perez-Gelabert, 2009
- Anaxipha conspersa (Bruner, 1916)
- Anaxipha contaminata (Karsch, 1893)
- Anaxipha copo Otte & Perez-Gelabert, 2009
- Anaxipha cregyos Otte & Perez-Gelabert, 2009
- Anaxipha daktrilla Otte & Perez-Gelabert, 2009
- Anaxipha dapsiles Otte, 2006
- Anaxipha delicatula (Scudder, 1878)
- Anaxipha desjardinsii (Serville, 1838)
- Anaxipha dimidiatipes (Bolívar, 1910)
- Anaxipha dolomedes Otte & Perez-Gelabert, 2009
- Anaxipha eminens Otte & Perez-Gelabert, 2009
- Anaxipha endoxos Otte & Perez-Gelabert, 2009
- Anaxipha eperatos Otte & Perez-Gelabert, 2009
- Anaxipha epicydes Otte, 2006
- Anaxipha esau Rehn, 1918
- Anaxipha euclastos Otte & Perez-Gelabert, 2009
- Anaxipha exagistos Otte, 2006
- Anaxipha exigua (Say, 1825)
- Anaxipha festina Otte & Perez-Gelabert, 2009
- Anaxipha fistulator Rehn, 1918
- Anaxipha fragilis Hebard, 1924
- Anaxipha fultoni Walker & Funk, 2014
- Anaxipha furtiva Otte & Perez-Gelabert, 2009
- Anaxipha furva (Karsch, 1893)
- Anaxipha fuscocinctum (Chopard, 1925)
- Anaxipha gilva (Karsch, 1893)
- Anaxipha gracilis (Scudder, 1869)
- Anaxipha grandis Chopard, 1968
- Anaxipha gueinzii (Kirby, 1906)
- Anaxipha henryi Chopard, 1936
- Anaxipha hirsuta Hebard, 1928
- Anaxipha hyalodes Otte, 2006
- Anaxipha hypaerios Otte, 2006
- Anaxipha hypergios Otte, 2006
- Anaxipha hypsipetes Otte & Perez-Gelabert, 2009
- Anaxipha imitator (Saussure, 1878)
- Anaxipha incompta (Walker, 1869)
- Anaxipha infirmenotata Chopard, 1956
- Anaxipha insularis (Walker, 1869)
- Anaxipha karschi (Karny, 1907)
- Anaxipha kilimandjarica Sjöstedt, 1910
- Anaxipha laepseros Otte, 2006
- Anaxipha laevithorax Chopard, 1927
- Anaxipha lanceolata (Walker, 1869)
- Anaxipha latefasciata Chopard, 1956
- Anaxipha lathrios Otte & Perez-Gelabert, 2009
- Anaxipha latipennis (Walker, 1869)
- Anaxipha lineatocollis (Serville, 1838)
- Anaxipha litarena Fulton, 1956
- Anaxipha longealata Chopard, 1930
- Anaxipha lucia Otte & Perez-Gelabert, 2009
- Anaxipha maculifemur Chopard, 1926
- Anaxipha maculifrons Chopard, 1937
- Anaxipha maculipes Chopard, 1929
- Anaxipha marginipennis Chopard, 1954
- Anaxipha maritima (Saussure, 1878)
- Anaxipha maxima (Bruner, 1916)
- Anaxipha minuta (Linnaeus, 1767)
- Anaxipha mjobergi Chopard, 1925
- Anaxipha musica (Saussure, 1878)
- Anaxipha natalensis Chopard, 1955
- Anaxipha nava Otte, 2006
- Anaxipha negrila Otte & Perez-Gelabert, 2009
- Anaxipha nemobioides Chopard, 1925
- Anaxipha nidaka Otte & Perez-Gelabert, 2009
- Anaxipha nigerrima Chopard, 1956
- Anaxipha nigrellus (Hebard, 1928)
- Anaxipha nigrescens Chopard, 1934
- Anaxipha nigripennis Chopard, 1956
- Anaxipha nigrithorax Chopard, 1928
- Anaxipha nimitata Otte & Perez-Gelabert, 2009
- Anaxipha nitida (Chopard, 1912)
- Anaxipha obscuripennis (Chopard, 1930)
- Anaxipha olmeca (Saussure, 1897)
- Anaxipha ornata Chopard, 1938
- Anaxipha othnia Otte, 2006
- Anaxipha pallens (Stål, 1861)
- Anaxipha papuana Chopard, 1951
- Anaxipha paraensis Rehn, 1918
- Anaxipha peregrina Otte, 2006
- Anaxipha peruviana (Saussure, 1874)
- Anaxipha philifolia Rentz, 1973
- Anaxipha phoxi Otte & Perez-Gelabert, 2009
- Anaxipha pictipennis Hebard, 1924
- Anaxipha platyptera Hebard, 1928
- Anaxipha praepostera Otte, 2006
- Anaxipha prosenes Otte, 2006
- Anaxipha pteticos Otte, 2006
- Anaxipha pulchra Roy, 1965
- Anaxipha pulicaria (Burmeister, 1838)
- Anaxipha rico Otte & Perez-Gelabert, 2009
- Anaxipha rosamacula Walker & Funk, 2014
- Anaxipha ruficeps Chopard, 1956
- Anaxipha rufoguttata Chopard, 1954
- Anaxipha schunkei Chopard, 1956
- Anaxipha scia Hebard, 1915
- Anaxipha scitula (Saussure, 1878)
- Anaxipha simulacrum Rehn, 1918
- Anaxipha sinktrilla Otte & Perez-Gelabert, 2009
- Anaxipha sirico Otte & Perez-Gelabert, 2009
- Anaxipha sjostedti Chopard, 1968
- Anaxipha slotinka Otte & Perez-Gelabert, 2009
- Anaxipha smithi (Saussure, 1897)
- Anaxipha soror Chopard, 1956
- Anaxipha stolzmannii (Bolívar, 1881)
- Anaxipha stramenticia Rehn, 1918
- Anaxipha straminea (Saussure, 1878)
- Anaxipha tachephona Desutter-Grandcolas, 2000
- Anaxipha tamucu Otte & Perez-Gelabert, 2009
- Anaxipha tatei Hebard, 1924
- Anaxipha tetyenna Otte & Alexander, 1983
- Anaxipha thomasi Walker & Funk, 2014
- Anaxipha tinnula Walker & Funk, 2014
- Anaxipha tinnulacita Walker & Funk, 2014
- Anaxipha tinnulenta Walker & Funk, 2014
- Anaxipha titschacki Chopard, 1954
- Anaxipha tooronga Otte & Alexander, 1983
- Anaxipha trigonidioides Chopard, 1962
- Anaxipha tripuraensis Shishodia & Tandon, 1990
- Anaxipha tychicos Otte, 2006
- Anaxipha uato Otte & Perez-Gelabert, 2009
- Anaxipha unicolor (Scudder, 1869)
- Anaxipha vadschaggae (Sjöstedt, 1910)
- Anaxipha valida (Bolívar, 1910)
- Anaxipha variegata (Chopard, 1912)
- Anaxipha vera Otte, 2006
- Anaxipha vernalis Walker & Funk, 2014
- Anaxipha vicina Chopard, 1925
- Anaxipha vigilax Otte & Perez-Gelabert, 2009
- Anaxipha vittata (Bolívar, 1888)
- Anaxipha vivax Otte & Perez-Gelabert, 2009
- Anaxipha volucer Otte, 2006
- Anaxipha woodruffi Otte & Perez-Gelabert, 2009
- Anaxipha yakuno Otte & Perez-Gelabert, 2009
- Anaxipha zebra Otte & Perez-Gelabert, 2009

== Fossil Species ==
- Anaxipha †dominica Vickery & Poinar, 1994
