= Paratrigonidium =

Scientific classification
- Kingdom: Animalia
- Phylum: Arthropoda
- Class: Insecta
- Order: Orthoptera
- Suborder: Ensifera
- Family: Trigonidiidae
- Tribe: Trigonidiini
- Genus: Paratrigonidium; Brunner von Wattenwyl, 1893

Genus of crickets

Paratrigonidium is a restored genus of Asian crickets in the tribe Trigonidiini, as originally erected by Carl Brunner von Wattenwyl 1893, but has been also placed as a subgenus in the similar type genus Trigonidium.

== Species ==
The Orthoptera Species File includes:

1. Paratrigonidium castaneum Brunner von Wattenwyl, 1893
2. Paratrigonidium chichila Ingrisch, 2001
3. Paratrigonidium chopardianum Ebner, 1943
4. Paratrigonidium coloratum Caudell, 1927
5. Paratrigonidium darevskii (Gorochov, 1987)
6. Paratrigonidium fasciatum Brunner von Wattenwyl, 1893
7. Paratrigonidium javanicum Caudell, 1927
8. Paratrigonidium majusculum Karny, 1915
9. Paratrigonidium nitidum Brunner von Wattenwyl, 1893 - type species (by subsequent designation)
10. Paratrigonidium striatum Shiraki, 1911
11. Paratrigonidium topali (Gorochov, 1987)
12. Paratrigonidium transversum Shiraki, 1930
13. Paratrigonidium unifasciatum Chopard, 1928
14. Paratrigonidium venustulum (Saussure, 1878)
