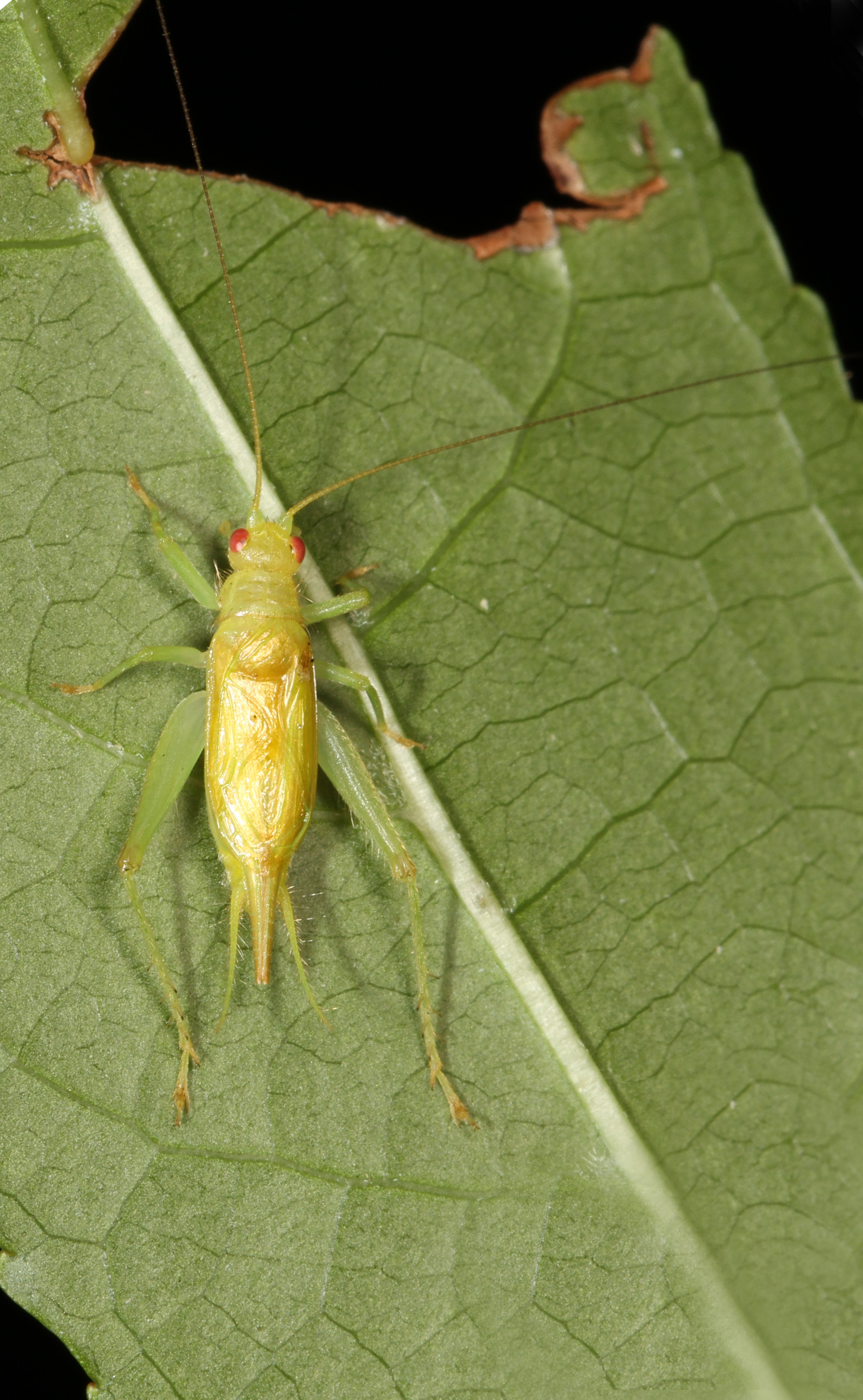
- Cyrtoxipha columbiana

Scientific classification
- Domain: Eukaryota
- Kingdom: Animalia
- Phylum: Arthropoda
- Class: Insecta
- Order: Orthoptera
- Suborder: Ensifera
- Family: Trigonidiidae
- Subfamily: Trigonidiinae
- Tribe: Trigonidiini
- Genus: Cyrtoxipha; Saussure, 1874

= Cyrtoxipha =

Genus of crickets

Cyrtoxipha is a genus of green trigs in the family Gryllidae. There are at least 30 described species in Cyrtoxipha.

== Species ==
These 30 species belong to the genus Cyrtoxipha.

- Cyrtoxipha abares Otte, D. & Perez-Gelabert, 2009
- Cyrtoxipha aguanueva Otte, D. & Perez-Gelabert, 2009
- Cyrtoxipha aleptos Otte, D. & Perez-Gelabert, 2009
- Cyrtoxipha aoratos Otte, D. & Perez-Gelabert, 2009
- Cyrtoxipha apiata Otte, D. & Perez-Gelabert, 2009
- Cyrtoxipha catherinae Otte, D. & Perez-Gelabert, 2009
- Cyrtoxipha cayman Otte, D. & Perez-Gelabert, 2009
- Cyrtoxipha clarki Otte, D. & Perez-Gelabert, 2009
- Cyrtoxipha columbiana Caudell, 1907 (Columbian trig)
- Cyrtoxipha confusa T. J. Walker, 1969
- Cyrtoxipha contumax Otte, D. & Perez-Gelabert, 2009
- Cyrtoxipha cracticos Otte, D. & Perez-Gelabert, 2009
- Cyrtoxipha cryptadia Otte, D. & Perez-Gelabert, 2009
- Cyrtoxipha ctilos Otte, D. & Perez-Gelabert, 2009
- Cyrtoxipha electrina Gorochov, 2010
- Cyrtoxipha errans Otte, D. & Perez-Gelabert, 2009
- Cyrtoxipha eucrines Otte, D. & Perez-Gelabert, 2009
- Cyrtoxipha gundlachi Saussure, 1874
- Cyrtoxipha hosios Otte, D. & Perez-Gelabert, 2009
- Cyrtoxipha illegibilis Gorochov, 2010
- Cyrtoxipha itame Otte, D. & Perez-Gelabert, 2009
- Cyrtoxipha laurelae Otte, D. & Perez-Gelabert, 2009
- Cyrtoxipha nola T. J. Walker, 1969
- Cyrtoxipha orientalis Bland & Desutter-Grandcolas, 2003
- Cyrtoxipha pallens Otte, D. & Perez-Gelabert, 2009
- Cyrtoxipha pernambucensis Rehn, J.A.G., 1920
- Cyrtoxipha poeyi Bolívar, I., 1888
- Cyrtoxipha pumila (Burmeister, H., 1838)
- Cyrtoxipha tempestiva Otte, D. & Perez-Gelabert, 2009
- Cyrtoxipha vespertina Otte, D. & Perez-Gelabert, 2009
