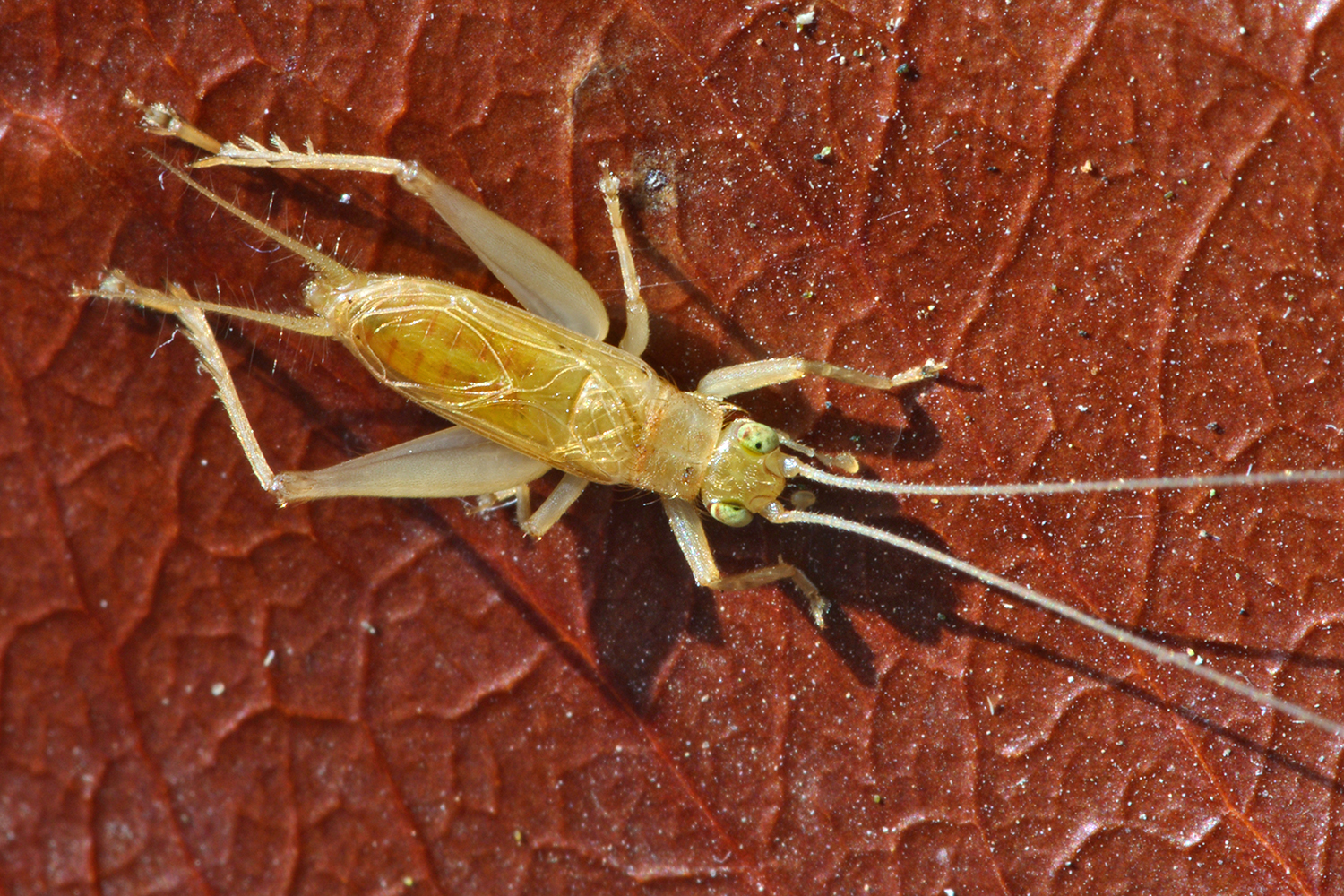
- Natula averni

Scientific classification
- Kingdom: Animalia
- Phylum: Arthropoda
- Class: Insecta
- Order: Orthoptera
- Suborder: Ensifera
- Family: Trigonidiidae
- Tribe: Trigonidiini
- Genus: Natula; Gorochov, 1987

= Natula =

Genus of crickets

Natula is a genus of sword-tail crickets in the tribe Trigonidiini.

== Species ==
Species have been recorded from Europe through to SE Asia and Australia; they include:

1. Natula anaxiphoides (Chopard, 1925)
2. Natula averni (Costa, 1855)
3. Natula longipennis (Serville, 1838)
4. Natula matsuurai Sugimoto, 2001
5. Natula pallidula (Matsumura, 1910)
6. Natula pravdini (Gorochov, 1985) - type species
