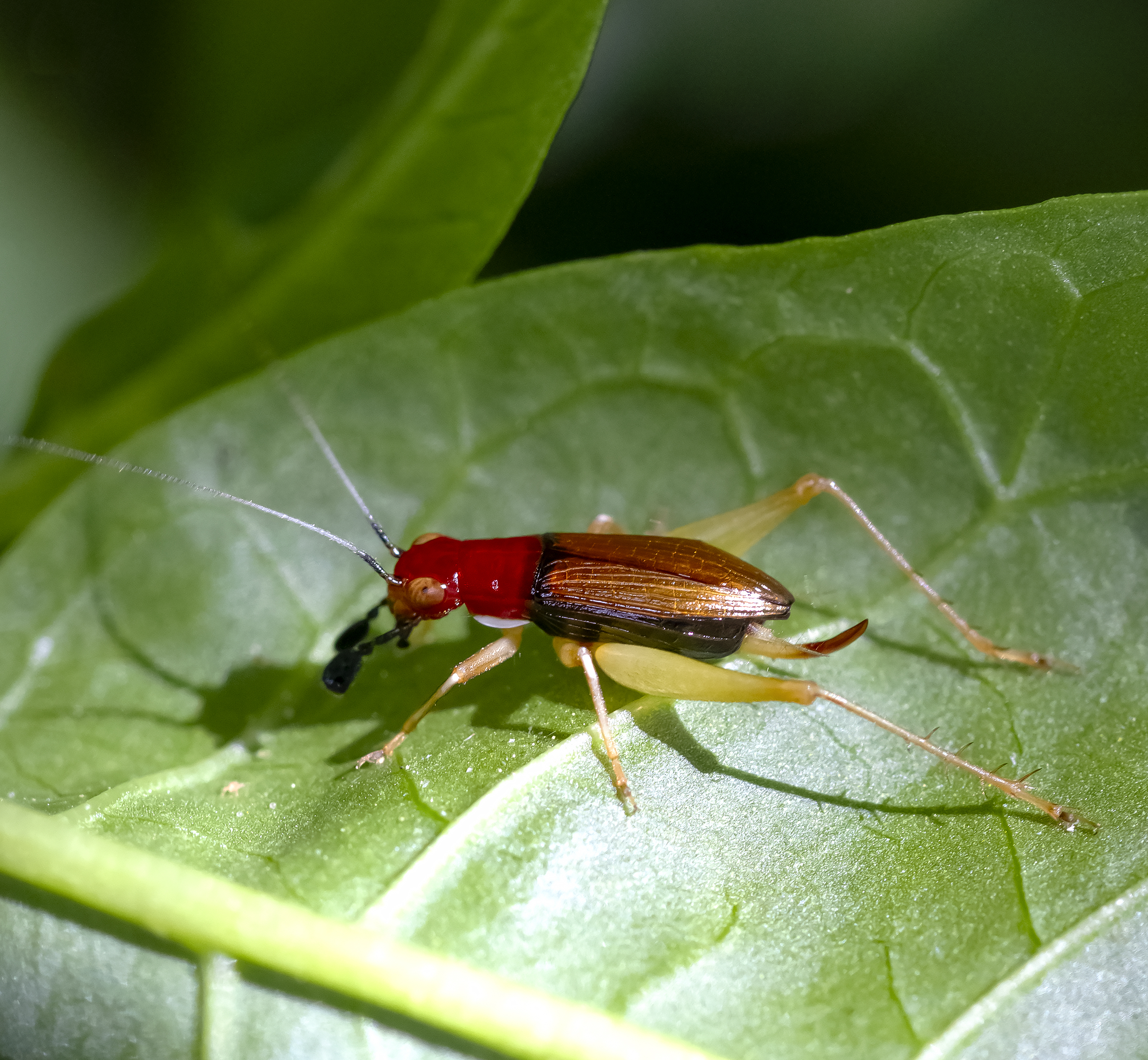
- Handsome trig female. (Lateral view)

Scientific classification
- Kingdom: Animalia
- Phylum: Arthropoda
- Class: Insecta
- Order: Orthoptera
- Suborder: Ensifera
- Family: Trigonidiidae
- Tribe: Phylloscyrtini
- Genus: Phyllopalpus
- Species: P. pulchellus

Binomial name
- Phyllopalpus pulchellus Uhler, 1864

= Phyllopalpus pulchellus =

Species of cricket

Phyllopalpus pulchellus, known generally as the red headed bush cricket, handsome trig or handsome bush cricket, is a species of winged bush cricket in the family Trigonidiidae. It is found in the eastern United States.

== Description ==
The adult has a red head and thorax. Its abodomen and wings are black. Its legs are translucent green to pale yellow. The forewings of females are convex and beetle-like, and the male's wings look like that of a typical cricket's. The male's left wing is clear. The average length of Phyllopalpus pulchellus is 7–9mm.

Its song sounds like a rattling trill. It is described as being quite loud.

== Geographic range ==
P. pulchellus is found in the eastern United States. It can be found as north as New Hampshire and as far south as northern Florida. Its range goes as far west as Houston, Texas.

== Reproduction ==
The males position their bodies in between a curved leaf or two leaves to amplify the sound of their chirps to find a mate.

During courtship, males first provide females a nuptial gift before transferring a larger spermatophore. If the female does not accept the nuptial gift, the male will eat it.

The females deposit their eggs in the trunks of trees.

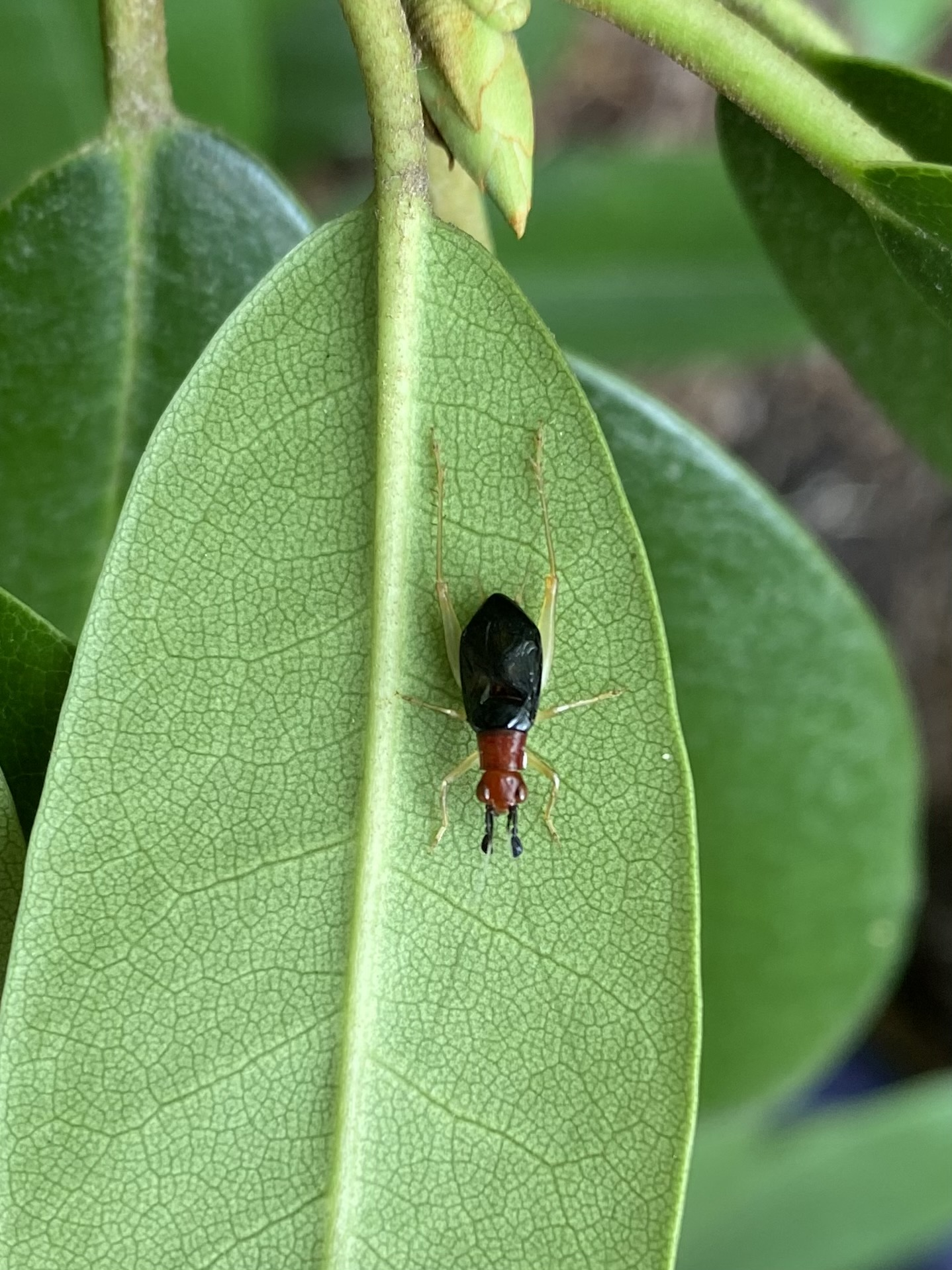
Phyllopalus pulchellus underneath a leaf.

== Diet ==
P. pulchellus eats flowers, leaves, smaller insects, and insect eggs. It is an omnivorous species.
