= Anaxiphomorpha =

Scientific classification
- Kingdom: Animalia
- Phylum: Arthropoda
- Class: Insecta
- Order: Orthoptera
- Suborder: Ensifera
- Family: Trigonidiidae
- Subfamily: Trigonidiinae
- Tribe: Trigonidiini
- Genus: Anaxiphomorpha; Gorochov, 1987

Genus of crickets

Anaxiphomorpha is a small Asian genus of "sword-tail crickets", in the subfamily Trigonidiinae and the tribe Trigonidiini.

== Species ==
The Orthoptera Species File lists the following from southern China and Vietnam:

1. Anaxiphomorpha biserratus Liu & Shi, 2015
2. Anaxiphomorpha brachyapodemalis Gorochov, 1987 - type species - locality Hanoi, Vietnam
3. Anaxiphomorpha brevisparamerus Liu & Shi, 2015
4. Anaxiphomorpha hexagona Ma, 2018
5. Anaxiphomorpha longiapodemalis Gorochov, 1987
6. Anaxiphomorpha longiserratus Liu & Shi, 2015
7. Anaxiphomorpha manereserratus He & Ma, 2021
8. Anaxiphomorpha nonggangensis He & Ma, 2021
9. Anaxiphomorpha serratiprotuberus Liu & Shi, 2015
