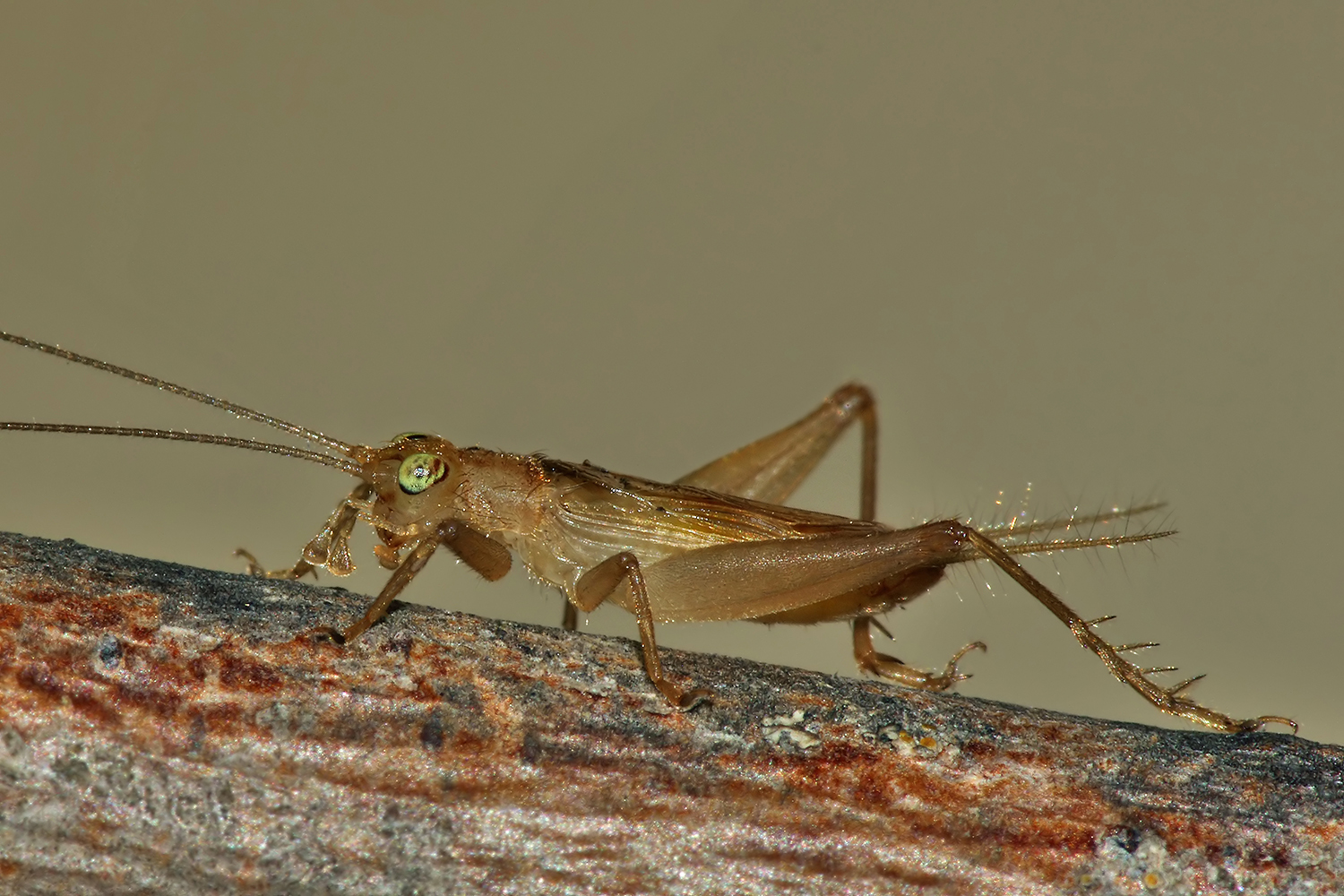
- N. averni, male

Scientific classification
- Domain: Eukaryota
- Kingdom: Animalia
- Phylum: Arthropoda
- Class: Insecta
- Order: Orthoptera
- Suborder: Ensifera
- Family: Trigonidiidae
- Genus: Natula
- Species: N. averni

Binomial name
- Natula averni (A. Costa, 1855)

= Natula averni =

Species of cricket

Natula averni is one of the smallest and most elusive species of cricket living in the Mediterranean Basin.

== Distribution and habitat ==
The species was found in several coastal regions of Italy, mostly on the Thyrrhenian coast, as well as in Sardinia and Sicily. N. averni was also found in Corsica, in the Balearic Islands, in the Canary Islands and in Turkey.

The taxonomic status of this species is still controversial. Even though currently its range is considered to include southern Europe and Turkey, it may be synonymous with Natula longipennis, in which case its range would include Africa and Asia. Furthermore, it could be a species complex, consisting of more species even in southern Europe.

== Description ==
The adult males grow up to 4.1–4.3 millimetres (0.16–0.17 in) long, while females reach 4.5–5 millimetres (0.18–0.20 in). The overall color is yellowish. Forewings cover entirely the abdomen, hind wings are much longer.

The song is a harmonious trill that can be heard from April to the late summer, and is disproportionately strong for a cricket just a few millimeters long: the position of the singing animal is very difficult to locate.

== Biology ==
The biology of this species is poorly known. Adults can be found in spring and summer in the reeds (hence the popular name «Reed cricket») from the most seaward tract of the estuaries and of the deltas, where this species seems to prefer marsh vegetation 1.5–3 metres (4 ft 11 in – 9 ft 10 in) high, such as Phragmites australis or similar reeds. Its tiny size and its color make it almost impossible to catch, but it can be attracted to light or found in pitfall traps.

Its elusiveness is the reason why this species is most probably underrecorded, and may prove less rare and more widespread than expected.

== Gallery ==
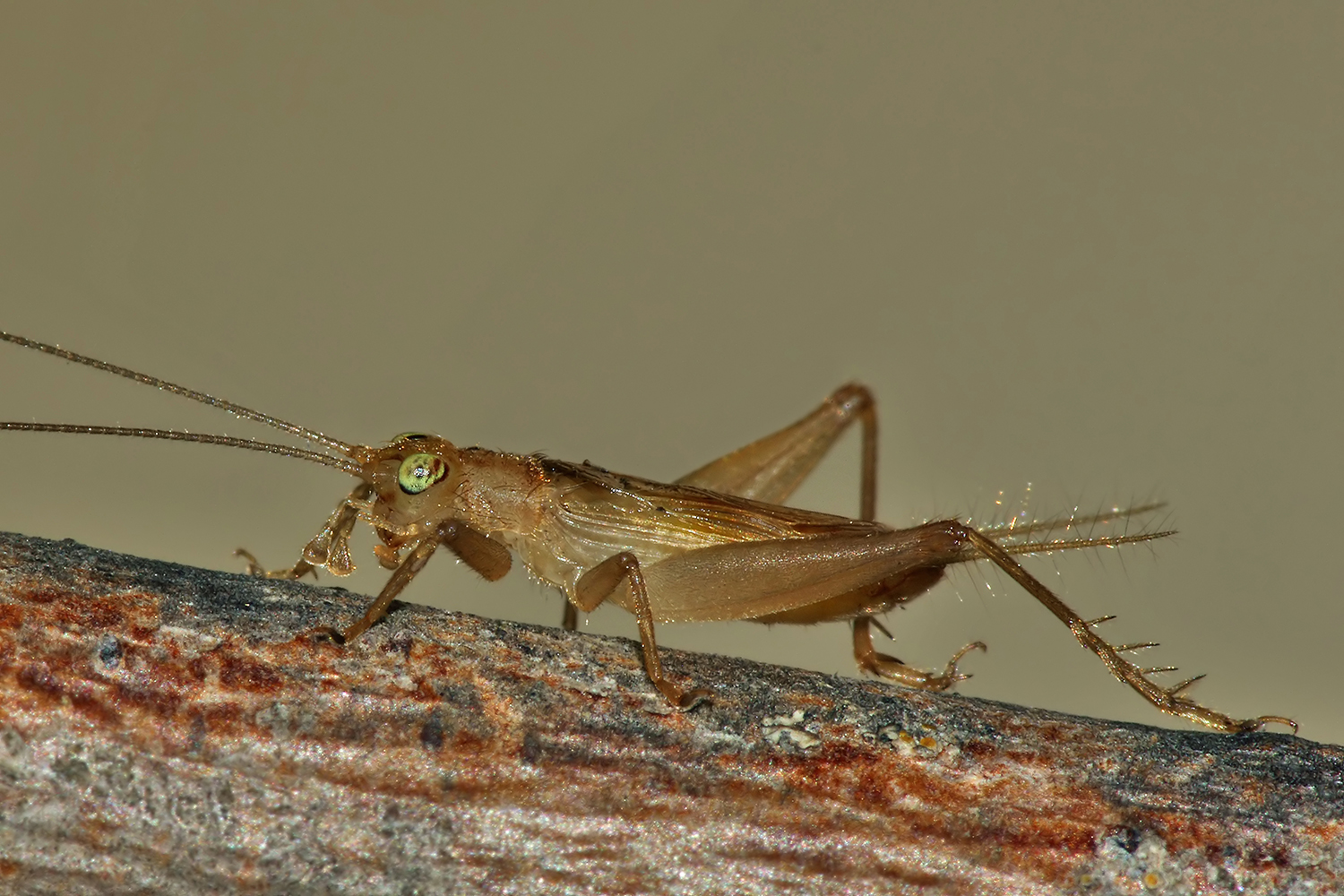
A male specimen of Natula averni, photographed in October 2019 at Elba

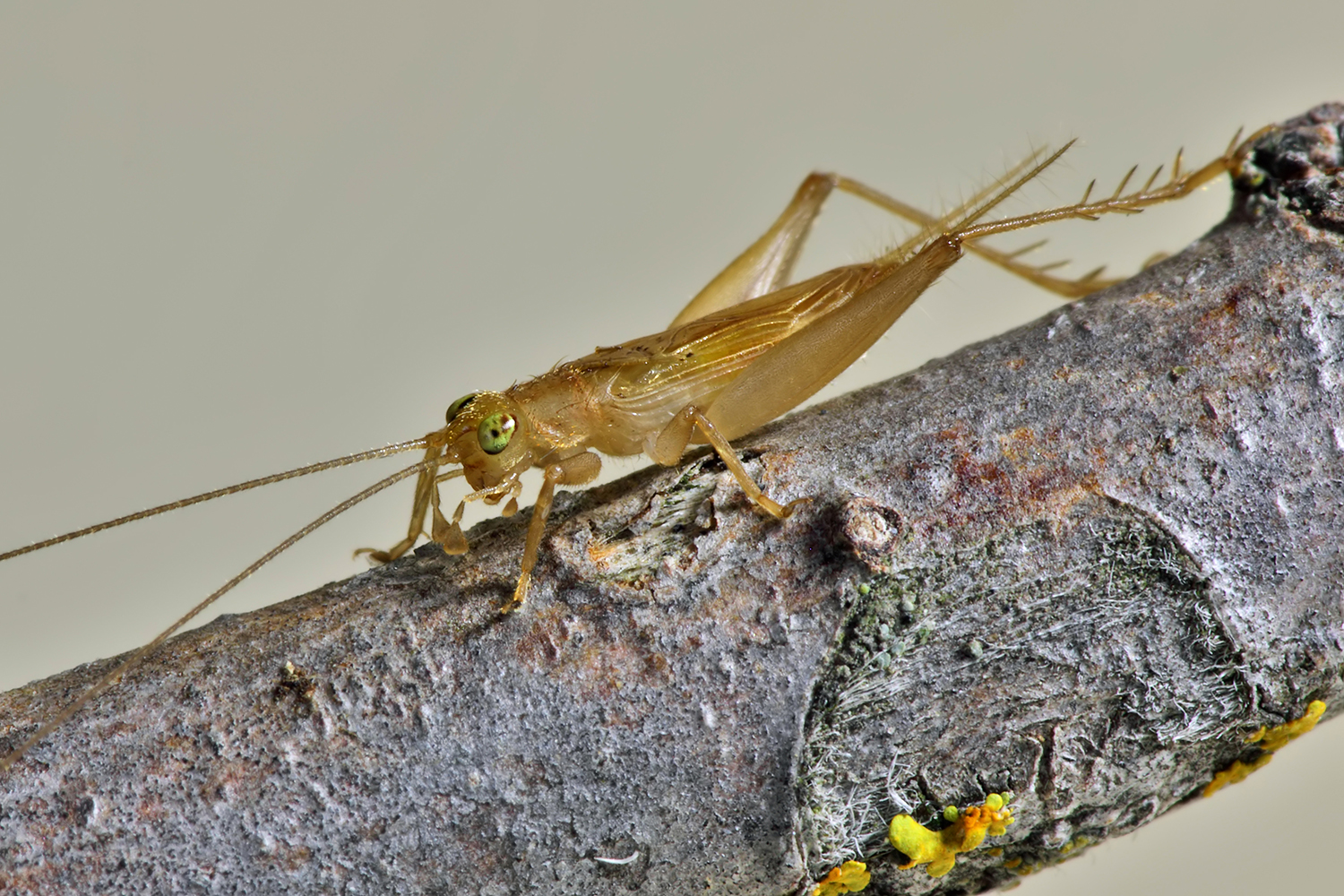
Another view of the same specimen

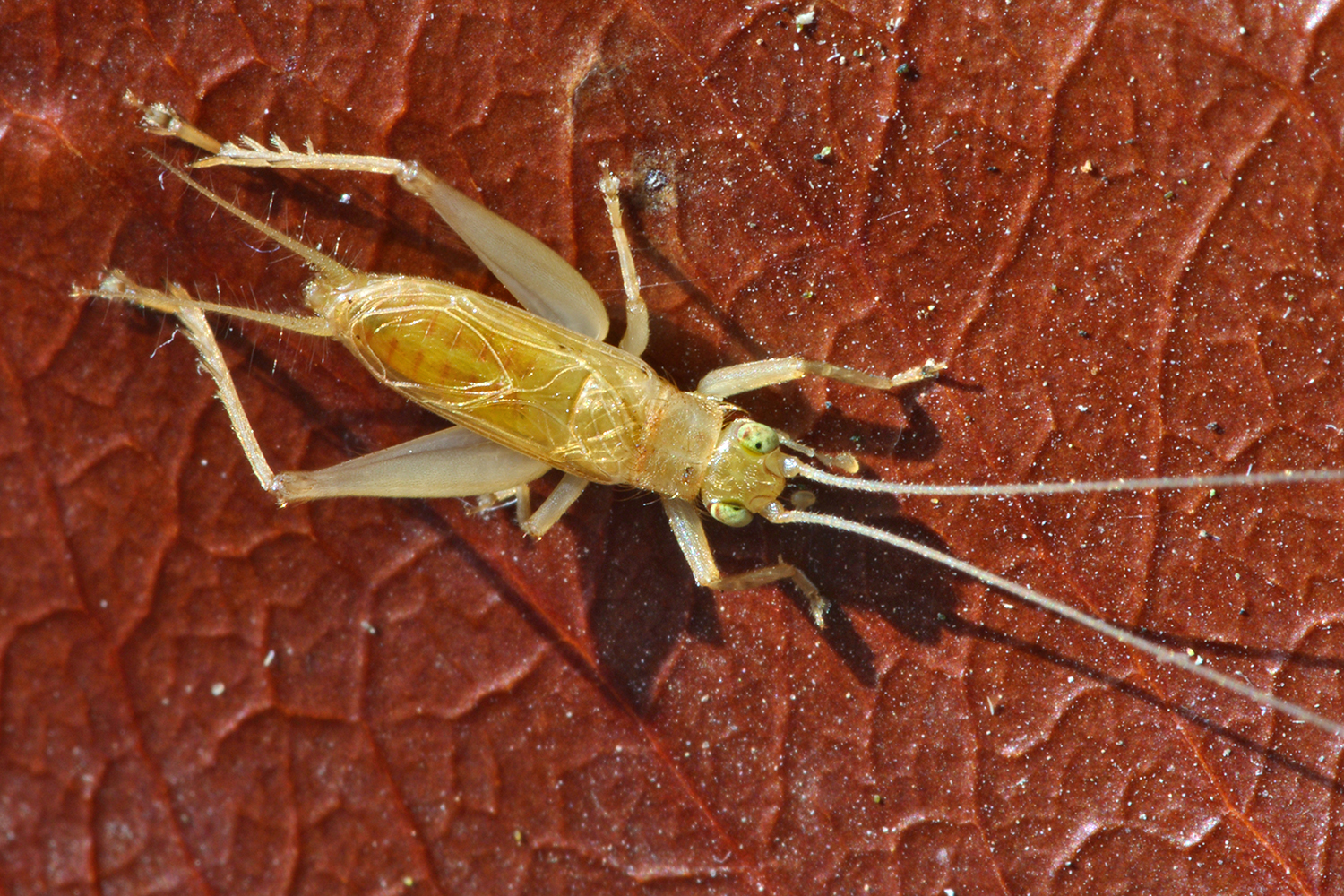
A specimen from above, showing the structure of the forewings

== Bibliography ==
- Brizio C., 2018. Biodiversity Journal, 2018, 9 (2): 135–142 >> Bioacoustic evidence of two uncommon crickets from SW Sardinia, including an analysis of the song of B. megacephalus in the ultrasonic range
- Gorochov A.V. & Llorente V., 2001. Graellsia, 57 (2): 95-139 >> Estudio taxonómico preliminar de los Grylloidea de España (Insecta, Orthoptera)
- Odé B., Kleukers R., Forbicioni L., Mass a B., Roesti C., Boitier E. & Braud Y., 2011. Articulata, 26 (1): 51-65 >> In search of the most mysterious orthopteran of Europe: the Reed cricket Natula averni (Orthoptera: Gryllidae)
- Surdo S., sicil., S. IV, XLIII (2), 2019, pp. 253-257 >> SICILIAN NATURALISTIC NEWS - Natula averni (Orthoptera, Gryllidae) 2nd

and the 3rd record in Sicily
