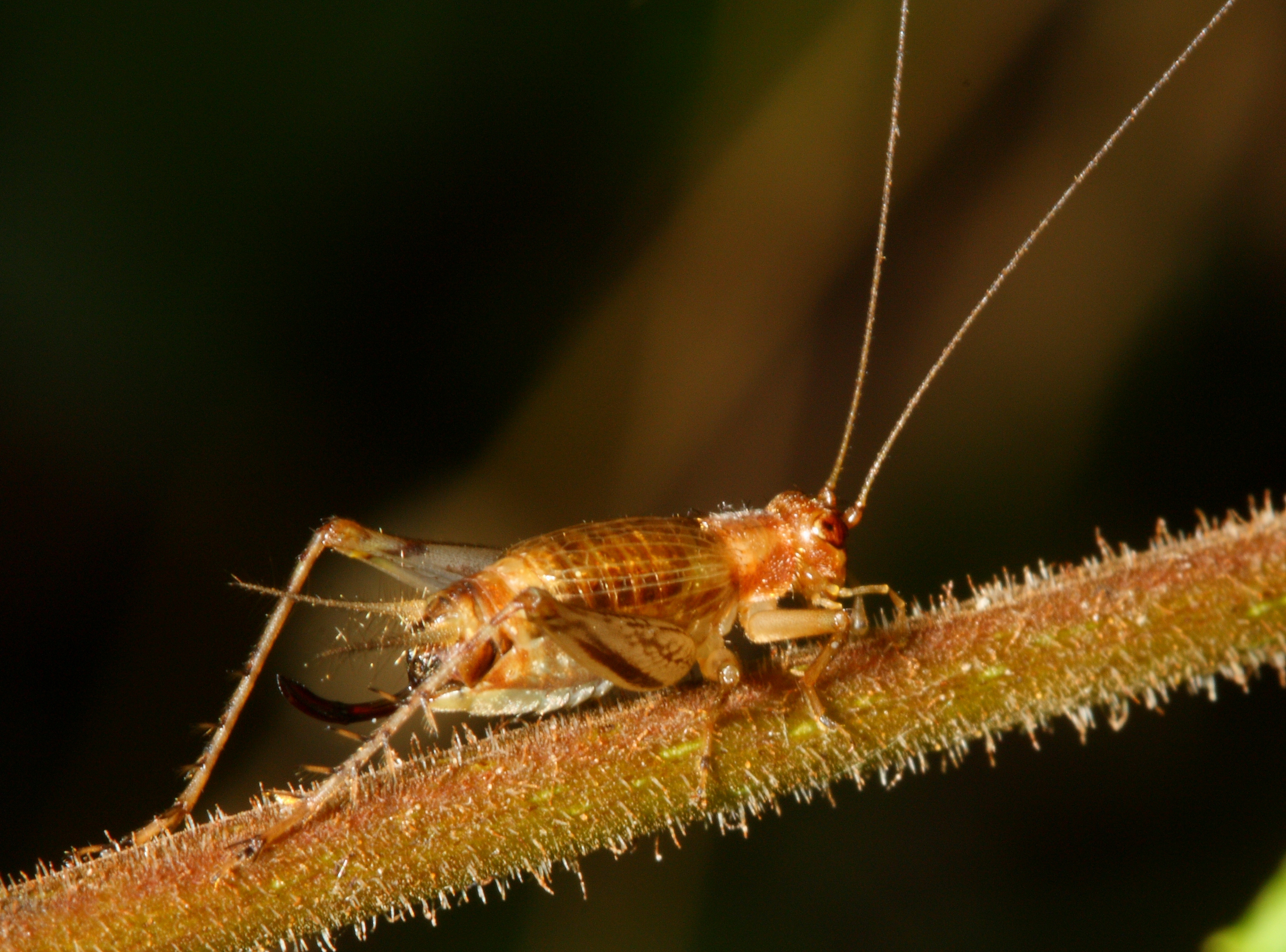

Scientific classification
- Domain: Eukaryota
- Kingdom: Animalia
- Phylum: Arthropoda
- Class: Insecta
- Order: Orthoptera
- Suborder: Ensifera
- Family: Trigonidiidae
- Genus: Anaxipha
- Species: A. exigua

Binomial name
- Anaxipha exigua Say, 1825

Synonyms
- Anaxipha pulicaria (Burmeister, 1838); Anaxipha pulicaria pulicaria (Burmeister, 1838)

= Anaxipha exigua =

Species of cricket

Anaxipha exigua is a cricket in the genus Anaxipha ("brown trigs"), in the subfamily Trigonidiinae ("winged bush crickets, trigs"). Common names are "Say's trig" and "Say's bush cricket". The distribution range of Anaxipha exigua includes the Caribbean and North America.

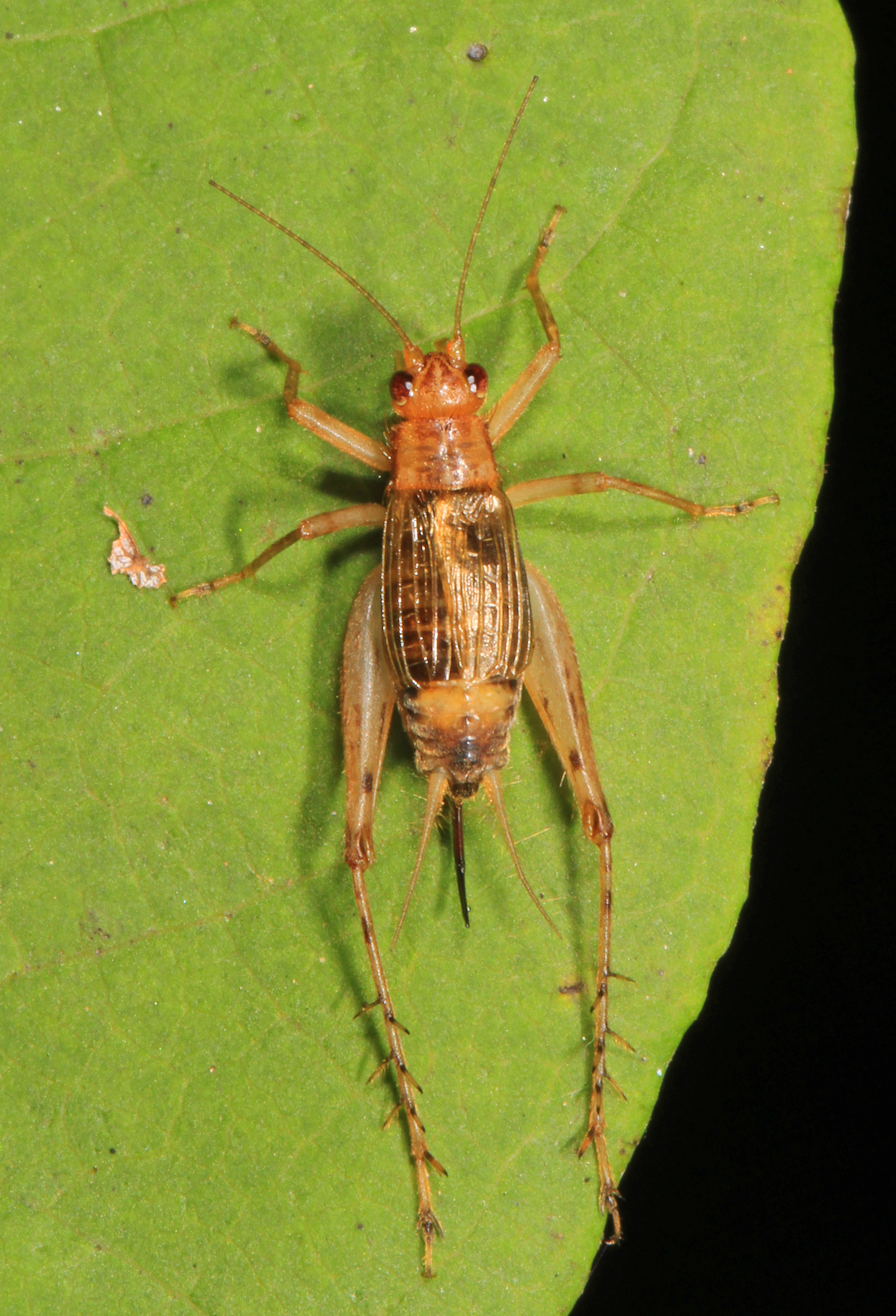

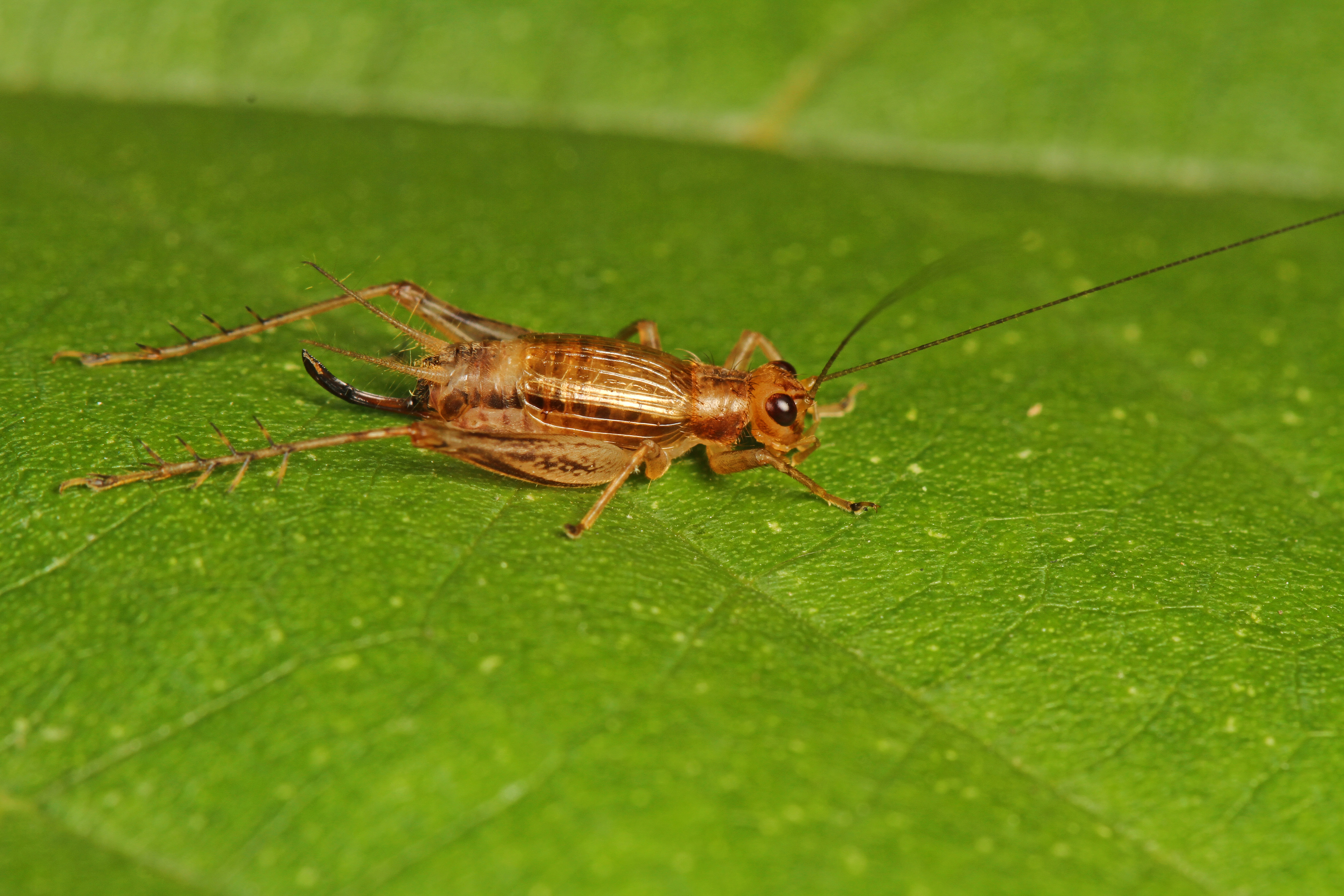
