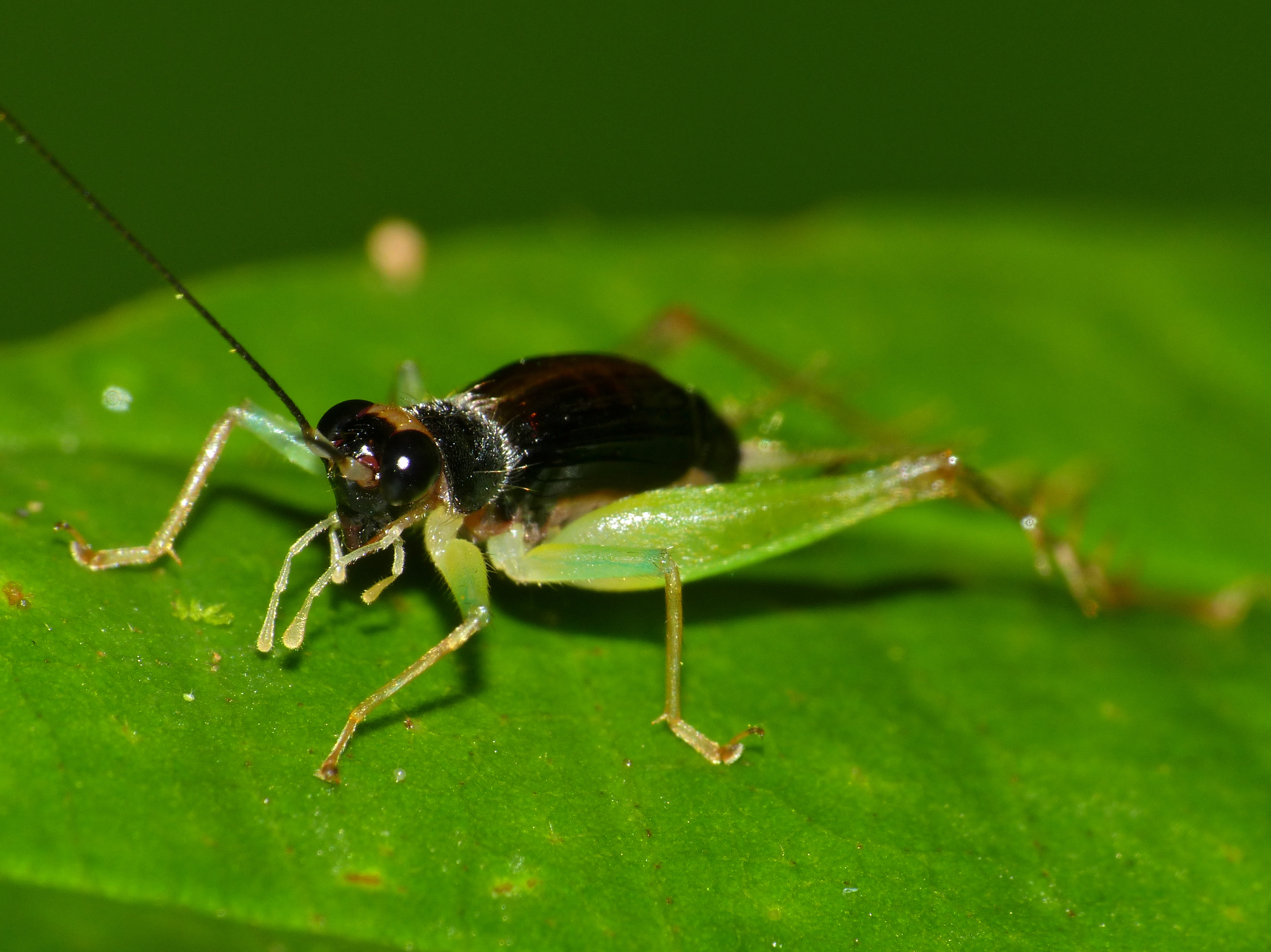

Scientific classification
- Kingdom: Animalia
- Phylum: Arthropoda
- Class: Insecta
- Order: Orthoptera
- Suborder: Ensifera
- Family: Trigonidiidae
- Subfamily: Trigonidiinae
- Tribe: Trigonidiini
- Genus: Trigonidium
- Subgenus: Metioche; Stål, 1877

Species
- see text

Synonyms
- Piestoxiphus Saussure, 1878; Litogryllus Hebard, 1926

= Metioche (cricket) =

Genus of crickets

Metioche is a subgenus in the sword-tail cricket genus Trigonidium in the tribe Trigonidiini. Species have been found in tropical South America, Africa, Asia and Australia.

== Species ==
The Orthoptera Species File lists:

1. Metioche apicalis (Chopard, 1930)
2. Metioche baroalbae Otte & Alexander, 1983
3. Metioche bicolor (Stål, 1861)
4. Metioche bimaculata Chopard, 1952
5. Metioche bolivari Chopard, 1968
6. Metioche boliviana (Chopard, 1956)
7. Metioche chamadara (Sugimoto, 2001)
8. Metioche comorana Chopard, 1956
9. Metioche fascithorax Chopard, 1929
10. Metioche flavipes (Brunner von Wattenwyl, 1878)
11. Metioche fusca (Chopard, 1917)
12. Metioche fuscicornis (Stål, 1861)
13. Metioche fusconatata Chopard, 1934
14. Metioche gigas (Bolívar, 1900)
15. Metioche haanii (Saussure, 1878)
16. Metioche japonica (Ichikawa, 2001)
17. Metioche kotoshoensis (Shiraki, 1930)
18. Metioche kuthyi Chopard, 1927
19. Metioche lateralis Chopard, 1927
20. Metioche lesnei Chopard, 1935
21. Metioche luteola (Butler, 1876)
22. Metioche machadoi Chopard, 1962
23. Metioche maorica (Walker, 1869)
24. Metioche massaica (Sjöstedt, 1910)
25. Metioche minuscula Chopard, 1962
26. Metioche monteithi Otte & Alexander, 1983
27. Metioche nigra Chopard, 1927
28. Metioche nigripes Chopard, 1926
29. Metioche ocularis (Saussure, 1899)
30. Metioche ornatipes Chopard, 1927
31. Metioche pallidicornis (Stål, 1861)
32. Metioche pallidinervis Chopard, 1928
33. Metioche pallipes (Stål, 1861)
34. Metioche perpusilla (Bolívar, 1912)
35. Metioche peruviana Chopard, 1956
36. Metioche quadrimaculata Chopard, 1952
37. Metioche schoutedeni Chopard, 1934
38. Metioche sexmaculata Chopard, 1952
39. Metioche substriata Chopard, 1962
40. Metioche tacita (Saussure, 1878)
41. Metioche vittaticollis (Stål, 1861) - type species - (M. v. vittaticollis from Manila, Philippines).
