= Nudilla =

Scientific classification
- Kingdom: Animalia
- Phylum: Arthropoda
- Class: Insecta
- Order: Orthoptera
- Suborder: Ensifera
- Family: Trigonidiidae
- Tribe: Trigonidiini
- Genus: Nudilla; Gorochov, 1988

Synonyms
- Laupala Otte, 1994

Genus of crickets

Nudilla (also known as Laupala) is a genus of Pacific islands crickets belonging to the tribe Trigonidiini.

== Species ==
The Orthoptera Species File includes:

1. Nudilla danieli Gorochov, 2018
2. Nudilla eukolea (Otte, 1994)
3. Nudilla eupacifica (Otte, 1994)
4. Nudilla fugax (Otte, 1994)
5. Nudilla hapapa (Otte, 1994)
6. Nudilla hualalai (Otte, 1994)
7. Nudilla kai (Otte, 1994)
8. Nudilla kanaele (Otte, 1994)
9. Nudilla kauaiensis (Otte, 1994)
10. Nudilla kohalensis (Otte, 1994)
11. Nudilla kokeensis (Otte, 1994)
12. Nudilla kolea (Otte, 1994)
13. Nudilla koloa (Otte, 1994)
14. Nudilla kona (Otte, 1994)
15. Nudilla lanaiensis (Otte, 1994)
16. Nudilla makaio (Shaw, 2000)
17. Nudilla makaweli (Otte, 1994)
18. Nudilla media (Otte, 1994)
19. Nudilla mediaspisa (Otte, 1994)
20. Nudilla melewiki (Shaw, 2000)
21. Nudilla molokaiensis (Otte, 1994)
22. Nudilla neospisa (Otte, 1994)
23. Nudilla nigra (Otte, 1994)
24. Nudilla nui (Otte, 1994)
25. Nudilla oahuensis (Otte, 1994)
26. Nudilla olohena (Otte, 1994)
27. Nudilla pacifica (Scudder, 1869) - type species (as Trigonidium pacificum Scudder, 1869)
28. Nudilla paranigra (Otte, 1994)
29. Nudilla parapacifica (Otte, 1994)
30. Nudilla paraprosea (Otte, 1994)
31. Nudilla prosea (Otte, 1994)
32. Nudilla pruna (Otte, 1994)
33. Nudilla spisa (Otte, 1994)
34. Nudilla tantalis (Otte, 1994)
35. Nudilla vespertina (Otte, 1994)
36. Nudilla waikemoi (Otte, 1994)
37. Nudilla wailua (Otte, 1994)
