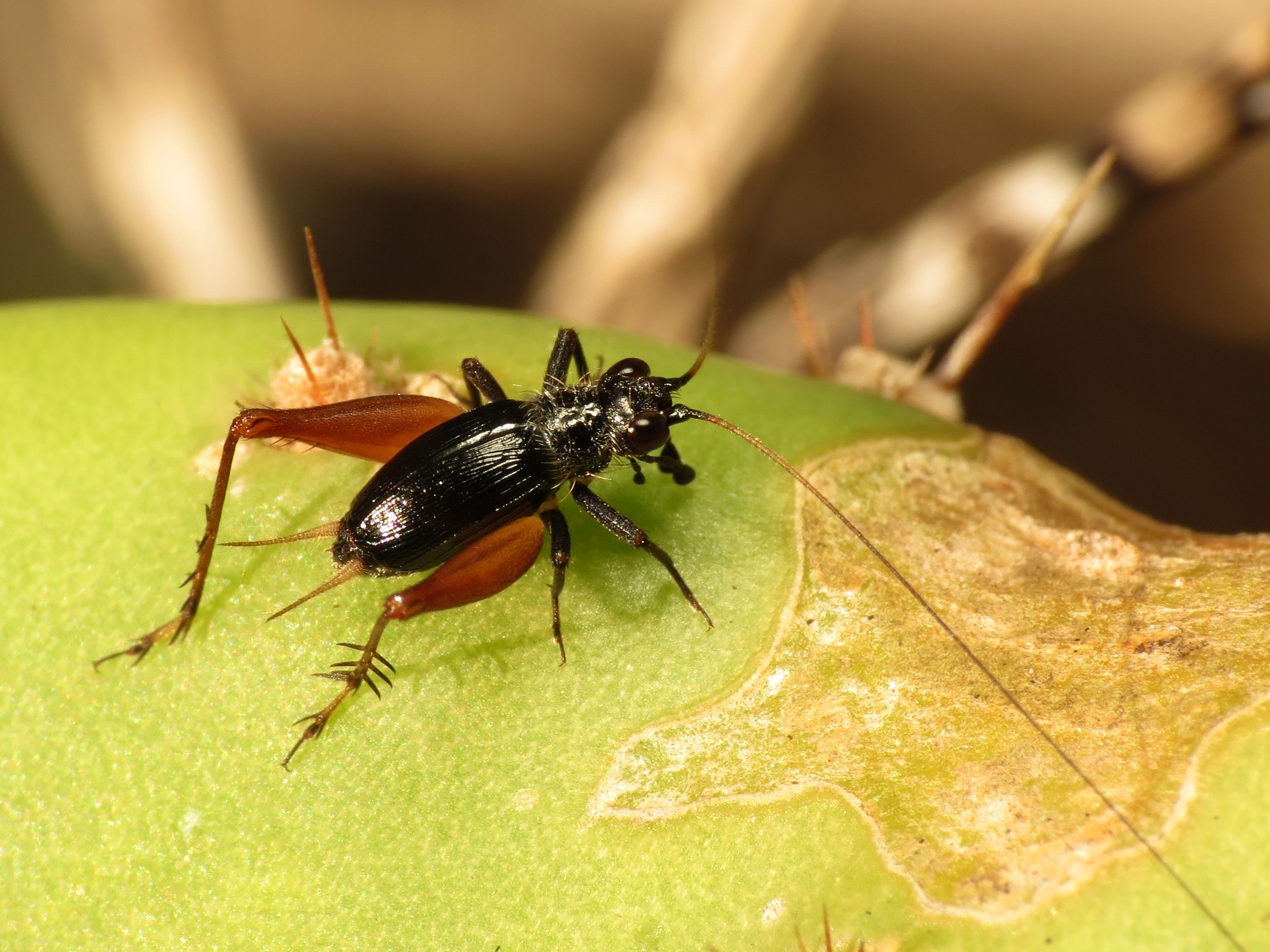
- Trigonidium cicindeloides male

Scientific classification
- Kingdom: Animalia
- Phylum: Arthropoda
- Class: Insecta
- Order: Orthoptera
- Suborder: Ensifera
- Family: Trigonidiidae
- Subfamily: Trigonidiinae; Saussure, 1870

Diversity
- >40 genera. See text.

= Trigonidiinae =

Subfamily of crickets

Trigonidiinae is a subfamily of insects in the order Orthoptera, suborder Ensifera, based on the type genus Trigonidium. They are often referred to as sword-tail crickets, winged bush crickets or trigs.

== Tribes and genera ==
The Orthoptera Species File lists:

=== Phylloscyrtini ===
Auth.: Chopard, 1968; distribution: Americas

1. Cranistus Stål, 1861
2. Phyllopalpus Uhler, 1864
3. Phylloscyrtus Guérin-Méneville, 1844

=== Trigonidiini ===
Auth.: Saussure, 1874; Worldwide distribution (except Antarctica)

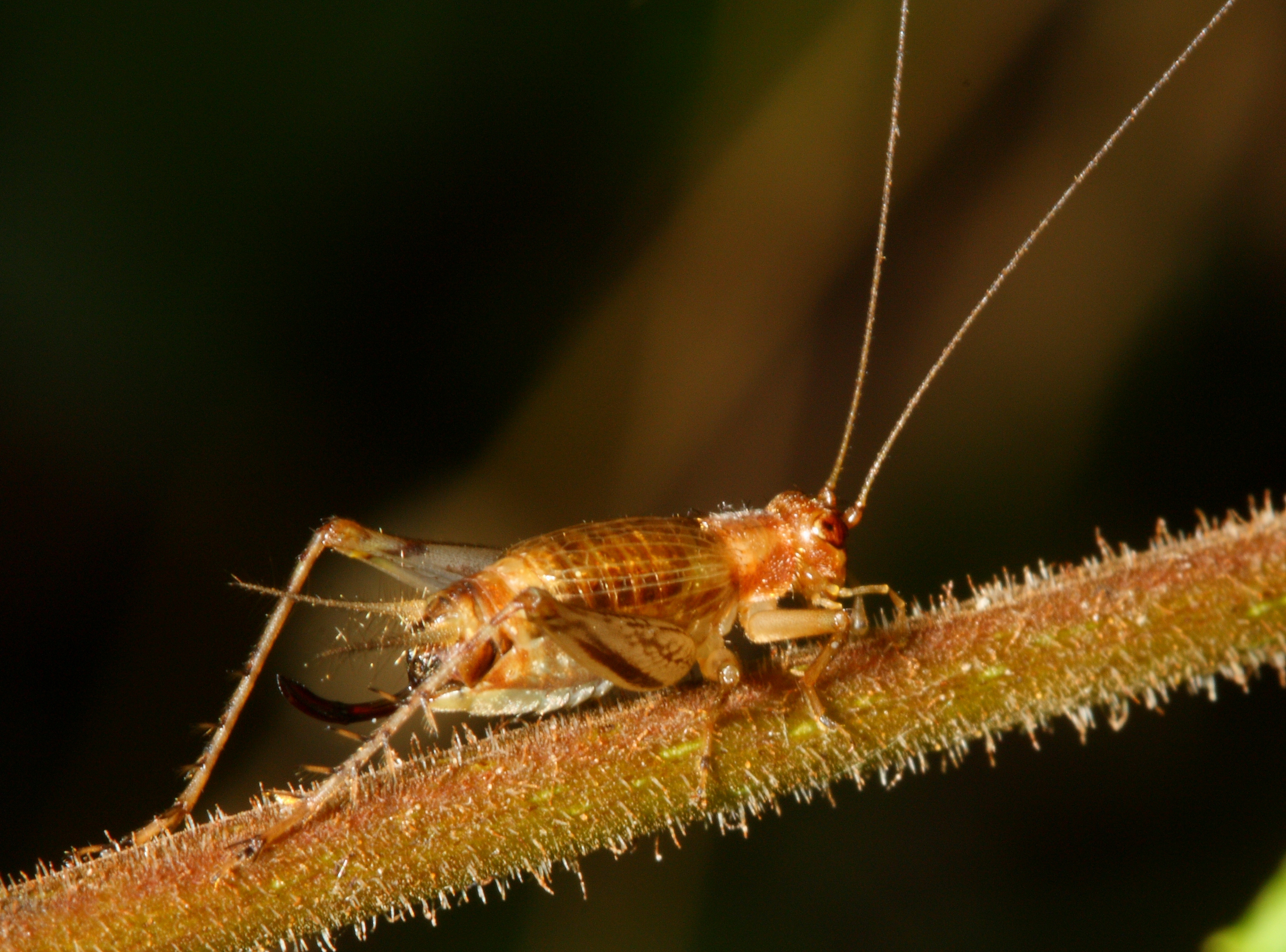
Anaxipha exigua female

1. †Abanaxipha Vickery & Poinar, 1994
2. Amusurgus Brunner von Wattenwyl, 1893
3. Anacyrtoxipha Chopard, 1934 - monotypic A. albotibialis (La Baume, 1911) - E. Africa
4. Anaxipha Saussure, 1874
5. Anaxiphomorpha Gorochov, 1987
6. Cyrtoxipha Brunner von Wattenwyl, 1873 - Americas
7. Cyrtoxiphoides Chopard, 1951
8. Dolichoxipha Chopard, 1951 – Australia
9. Estrellina- monotypic E. rehni Hebard, 1933
10. Falcicula - monotypic F. hebardi Rehn, 1903
11. Flospes Ma & He, 2022
12. Hebardinella - monotypic H. americana (Chopard, 1932)
13. Homoeoxipha Saussure, 1874
14. Hydropedeticus - monotypic H. vitiensis Miall & Gilson, 1902 - Fiji
15. Jarmilaxipha - monotypic J. ecuadorica Otte & Peck, 1998 - Galapagos Is.
16. Lobeda Walker, 1869
17. Macroanaxipha Hebard, 1928
18. Metiochodes Chopard, 1932
19. Natula Gorochov, 1987
20. Nudilla Gorochov, 1988 (synonym Laupala Otte, 1994)
21. Paratrigonidium Brunner von Wattenwyl, 1893
22. Prolaupala Otte, 1994
23. Rhicnogryllus Chopard, 1925
24. Sectus Ma & Pan, 2019
25. Svistella Gorochov, 1987
26. Symphyloxiphus Rehn, 1906 - S. America
27. Trigonidium Rambur, 1838
  includes subgenus Metioche Stål, 1877 and Trigonidomorpha Chopard, 1925
28. Zarceomorpha - monotypic Z. abdita Gorochov, 1994
29. Zarceus Bolívar, 1895
30. Zudella Gorochov, 1988

=== Tribe incertae sedis ===
1. Anele (cricket) Otte, Carvalho & Shaw, 2003
2. Fijixipha Otte & Cowper, 2007
3. Kadavuxipha Otte & Cowper, 2007
4. Levuxipha Otte & Cowper, 2007
5. Minutixipha Otte & Cowper, 2007
6. Myrmegryllus Fiebrig, 1907
7. Nanixipha Otte, Carvalho & Shaw, 2003
8. Nausorixipha Otte & Cowper, 2007
9. Savuxipha Otte & Cowper, 2007
10. Tavukixipha Otte & Cowper, 2007
11. Vanuaxipha Otte & Cowper, 2007
12. Veisarixipha Otte & Cowper, 2007
13. Vitixipha Otte & Cowper, 2007
14. Vudaxipha Otte & Cowper, 2007

=== Fossil genera ===
- †Abanaxipha
- †Grossoxipha
- †Proanaxipha
