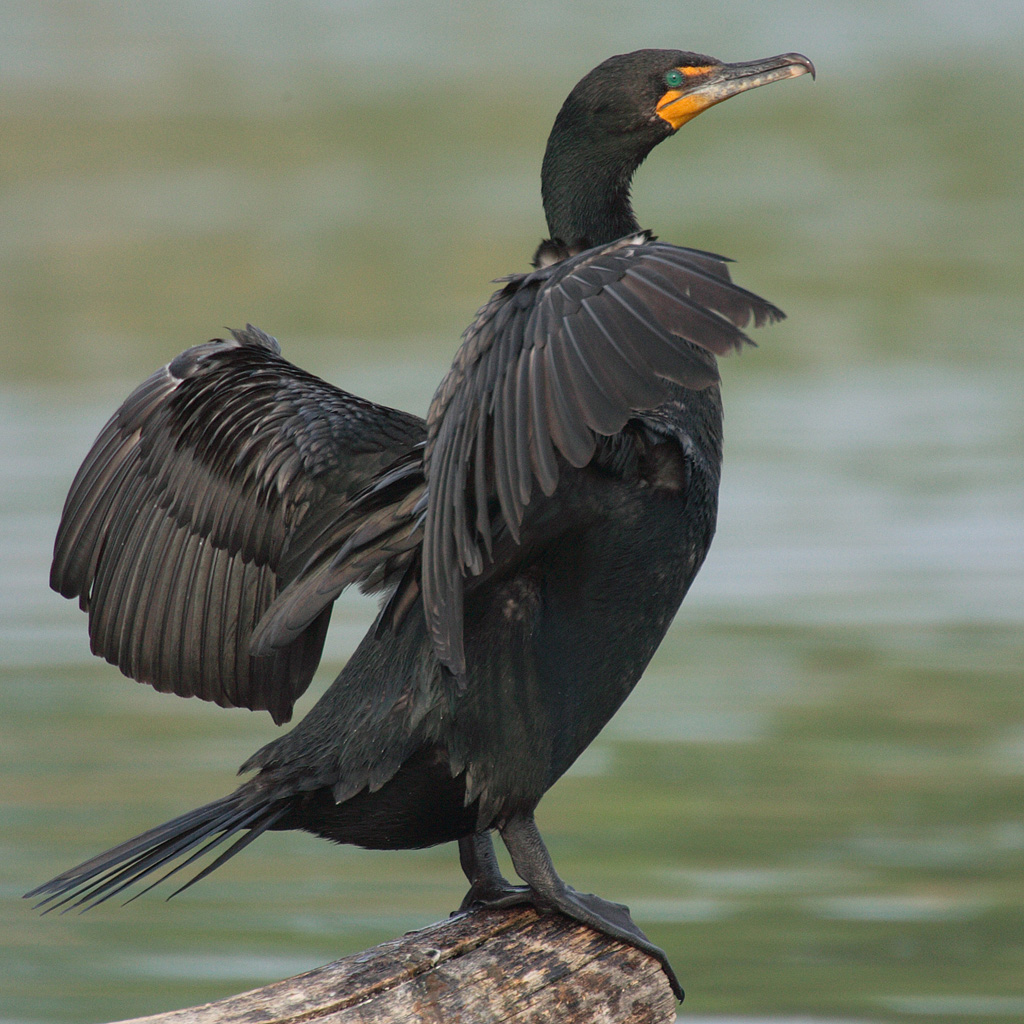
- Adult in non-breeding plumage
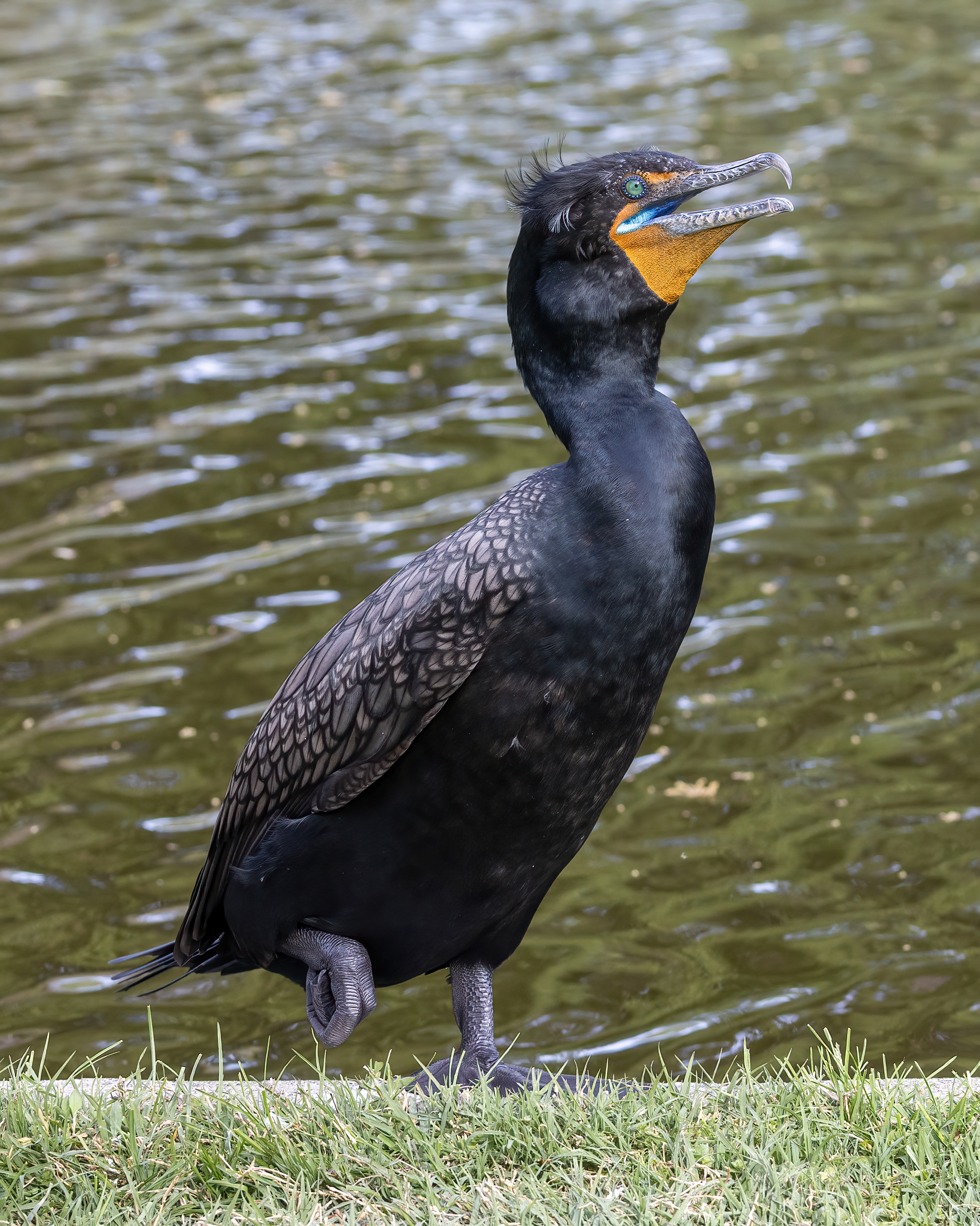
- Adult in breeding plumage Sound

Conservation status
- Least Concern (IUCN 3.1)

- Secure (NatureServe)

Scientific classification
- Kingdom: Animalia
- Phylum: Chordata
- Class: Aves
- Order: Suliformes
- Family: Phalacrocoracidae
- Genus: Nannopterum
- Species: N. auritum

Binomial name
- Nannopterum auritum (Lesson, 1831)
- Geographical distribution of Double-crested cormorant. Breeding Migration Year-round Nonbreeding

Synonyms
- Carbo auritus Lesson, 1831; Dilophalieus auritus (Lesson, 1831); Phalacrocorax dilophus Phalacrocorax auritus Nesocarbo auritum

= Double-crested cormorant =

Double-crested cormorant Temporal range: Pleistocene–present

Species of bird

The double-crested cormorant (Nannopterum auritum) is a member of the cormorant family of water birds. It is found near rivers and lakes and in coastal areas and is widely distributed across North America, from the Aleutian Islands in Alaska down to Florida and Mexico. Measuring 70–90 cm (28–35 in) in length, it is entirely black except for a bare patch of orange-yellow facial skin and some extra plumage that it exhibits in the breeding season when it grows a double crest in which black feathers are mingled with white. Five subspecies are recognized. It mainly eats fish and hunts by swimming and diving. Its feathers, like all cormorants, are not waterproof, and it must dry them out after spending time in the water. Once threatened by the use of DDT, the numbers of this bird have increased markedly in recent years.

== Taxonomy ==
The double-crested cormorant was described by René Primevère Lesson in 1831. It was formerly classified in the genus Phalacrocorax, but a 2014 study supported reclassifying it and several other American cormorant species into the genus Nannopterum. The IOC followed this classification in 2021.

Its scientific genus name is derived from the Greek words νᾶνος : nános, "small" and πτερόν : pterón, "wing". This genus name was originally coined for the flightless cormorant (N. harrisi), which does have very small wings; although the double-crested cormorant has normal-sized wings, it (along with the neotropic cormorant, N. brasilianum) was still reclassified into the genus Nannopterum when the relationship between it and the flightless cormorant became apparent. The species name is from the Latin auritus, "eared", referring to its nuptial crests. Its common name refers to the same nuptial crests.

Five subspecies are recognized:

- N. a. albociliatum (Ridgway 1884), Farallon cormorant, breeds along the Pacific coast of North America from British Columbia to Bird Island in the state of Sinaloa, Mexico, and possibly even further south. Significant colonies of these birds may also be found further inland including areas around the Salton Sea. According to currently available information, this subspecies is the third largest among the subspecies of the double-crested cormorant. Historical records indicate that this species was far more abundant in the past, but due to human persecution and development in their breeding range, the population of this subspecies has declined. The largest colony of cormorants in North America consisted of members of this subspecies at San Martin Island, Baja California Territory, Mexico, and was recorded in 1913. Physically, this subspecies is fairly large and has white to partially white nuptial crests.
- N. a. auritum (Lesson, 1831), the nominate subspecies, has the largest and most widespread breeding population. It ranges from the Great Basin and Rocky Mountains east into central and eastern North America. This region includes the Canadian prairies and the Great Lakes. Historically, this subspecies has bred in abundance across most of this region, though there are questions as to whether this bird has always bred in the Great Lakes region. Some evidence indicates that the bird has only begun breeding in the region since the early 20th century while other evidence suggests that it has been breeding in the region much longer. Physically, this subspecies is moderately large and has black nuptial crests.
- N. a. cincinnatum (Brandt 1837), white-crested cormorant, currently this is the most geographically restricted subspecies with the smallest population. It is found along the southern coast of Alaska and on the Aleutian Islands, ranging west from Kodiak to Chuginidak in the Aleutians. Historically, the range extended west to the Near Islands, but possibly due to nest predation by introduced foxes, the birds were no longer breeding in the area by the mid-1930s. Physically, this subspecies is the largest and it bears straight, white nuptial crests.
- N. a. floridanum (Audubon 1835), Florida cormorant, the smallest of the five subspecies, it is found from southern and central Texas east to the Atlantic and from North Carolina south to Florida. Records indicate that this subspecies was abundant throughout its range before the 20th century, but now is only abundant in Florida. This bird has dark nuptial crests.
- N. a. heuretum This subspecies bears straight, white nuptial crests. Physically, it is the smallest. It has bare lores and a greenish gloss on the head and neck. It breeds only in the mangroves surrounding interior lakes of San Salvador in the Bahamas. It may also be resident on other Bahamian islands.

== Description ==
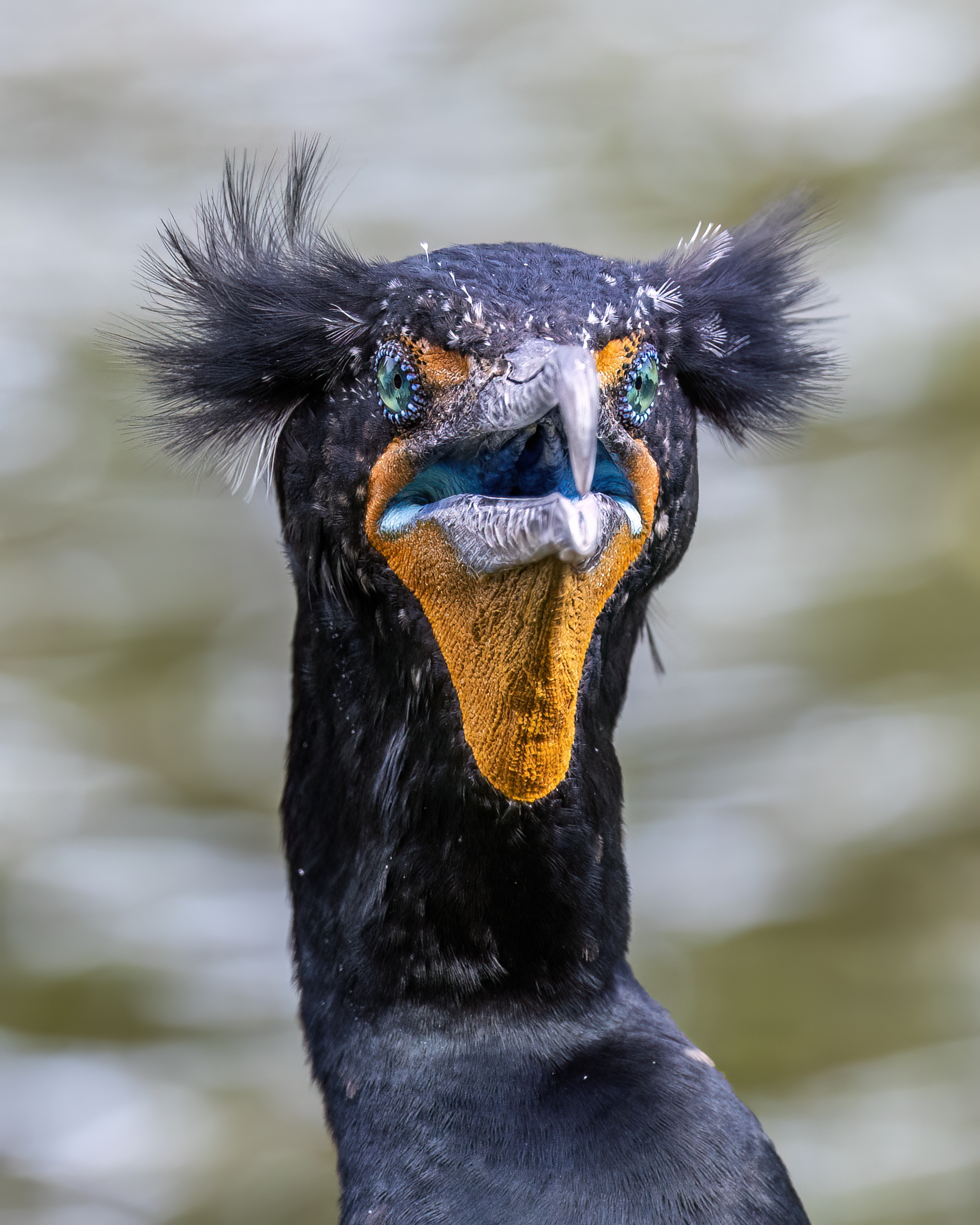
Close-up of an adult in breeding plumage with dark crests

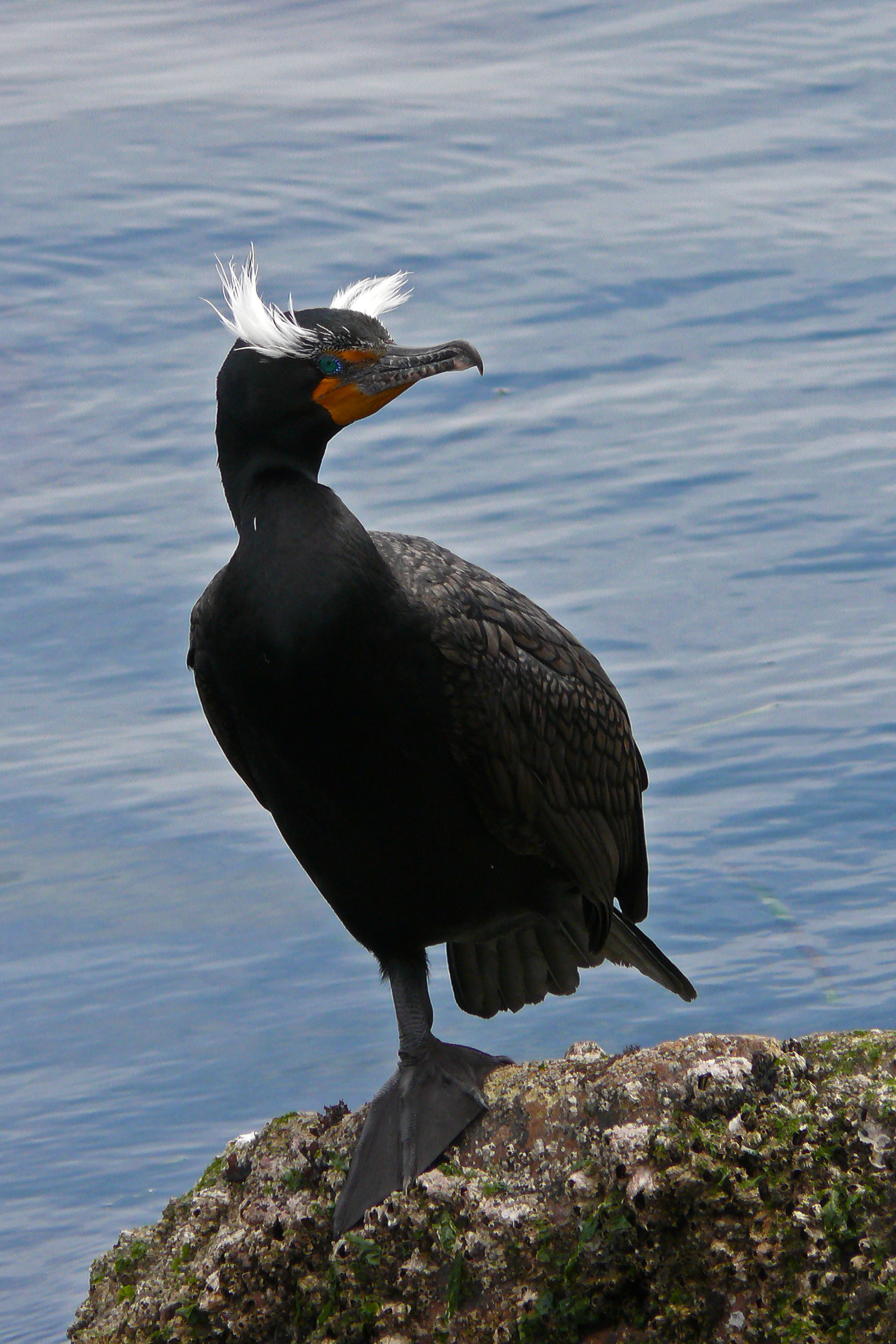
Adult in breeding plumage with white crests

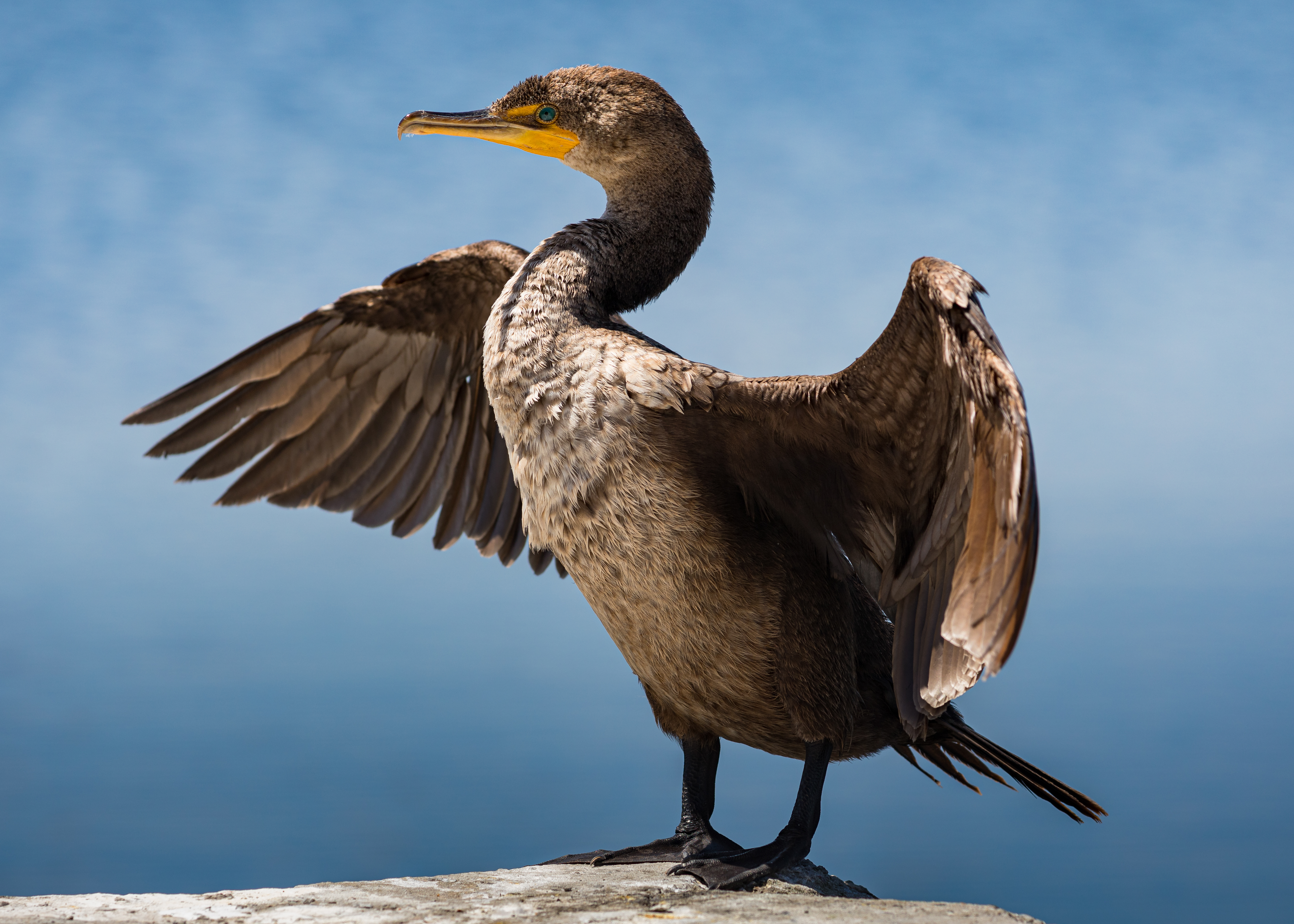
Juvenile plumage, California

The double-crested cormorant is a large waterbird with a stocky body, long neck, medium-sized tail, webbed feet, and a medium-sized hooked bill. It has a body length of between 70 and 90 cm (28 and 35 in) long, with a wingspan of between 114 and 123 cm (45 and 48 in). Double-crested cormorants weigh between 1.2 and 2.5 kg (2.6 and 5.5 lb). Males and females do not display sexual dimorphism.

This species has dark-colored plumage with bare supra-loreal skin and gular skin that is yellow or orange. An adult in breeding plumage will be mostly black with the back and coverts being a dark grayish towards the center. Nuptial crests, for which the species is named, are either white, black or a mix of the two. These are located just above the eyes with the bare skin on the face of a breeding adult being orange. A non-breeding adult will lack the crests and have more yellowish skin around the face. The bill of the adult is dark-colored. The double-crested cormorant is very similar in appearance to the larger great cormorant, which has a more restricted distribution in North America, mainly on the Canadian maritime provinces; it can, however, be separated by having more yellow on the throat and the bill. The neotropic cormorant also looks very similar, and the two species can sometimes be found together where their ranges meet.

The plumage of juvenile double-crested cormorants is more dark gray or brownish. The underparts of a juvenile are lighter than the back with a pale throat and breast that darkens towards the belly. As a bird ages, its plumage will grow darker. The bill of a juvenile will be mostly orange or yellowish.

== Distribution and habitat ==
A very common and widespread species, it winters anywhere that is ice-free along both coasts, as far north as southern Alaska (on the west coast) and southern New England (on the east coast). It can be found as far south as Mexico and the Bahamas. It migrates from the coldest parts of its breeding range, such as eastern Canada, and has occurred in Europe as a very rare vagrant, for example in Great Britain, Ireland, and the Azores.

It is resident on Pacific Coast from Aleutian Islands south to Nayarit, Mexico (but excluding parts of British Columbia and the Southern California Bight) and inland to the Colorado River, resident on Atlantic Coast in Long Island and surrounding areas, southern New England, Florida, Cuba, and Yucatán Peninsula. Its breeding range extends north throughout most of north-central North America, from Utah north to Alberta east through the Great Lakes states to Nova Scotia, and south to northern Massachusetts, along with parts of Alaska adjoining Bristol and Kuskokwim Bays. Its nonbreeding range extends throughout all coastal plains in the US, including the Atlantic and Gulf Coastal Plains south to Campeche, as well as the Bahamas, Turks and Caicos, Hispaniola, and Cayman Islands, along with all areas previously stated to be resident. On the Pacific Coast, range includes all areas previously mentioned to be resident, along with British Columbia and the Southern California Bight.

== Behavior ==
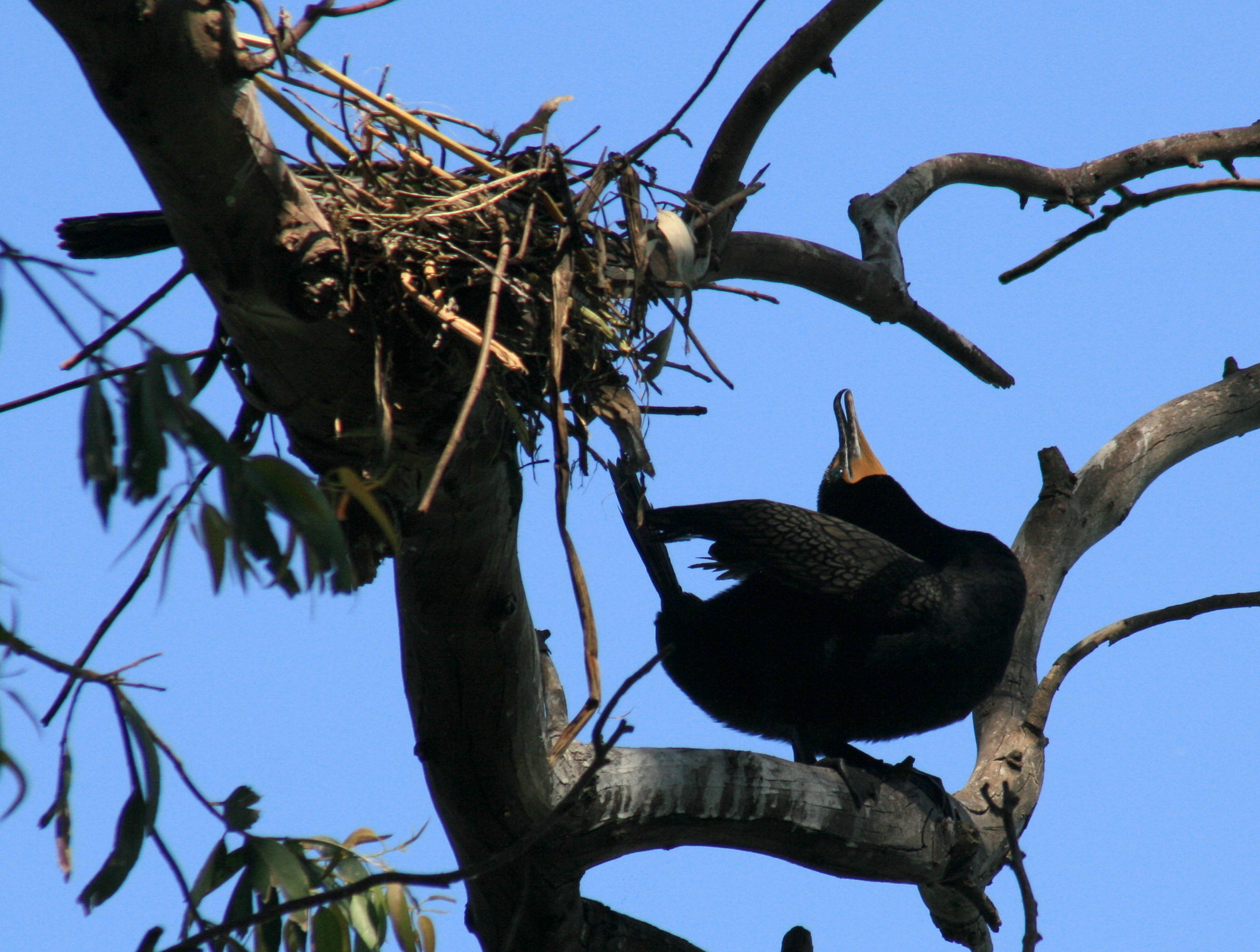
Displaying, California

The double-crested cormorant swims low in the water, often with just its neck and head visible, and dives from the surface. It uses its feet for propulsion and is able to dive to a depth of 1.5–7.5 m (4 ft 11 in – 24 ft 7 in) for 30–70 seconds. After diving, it spends long periods standing with its wings outstretched to allow them to dry, since they are not fully waterproofed. This species flies low over the water, with its bill tilted slightly upward, sometimes leaving the colony in long, single-file lines.

=== Diet ===
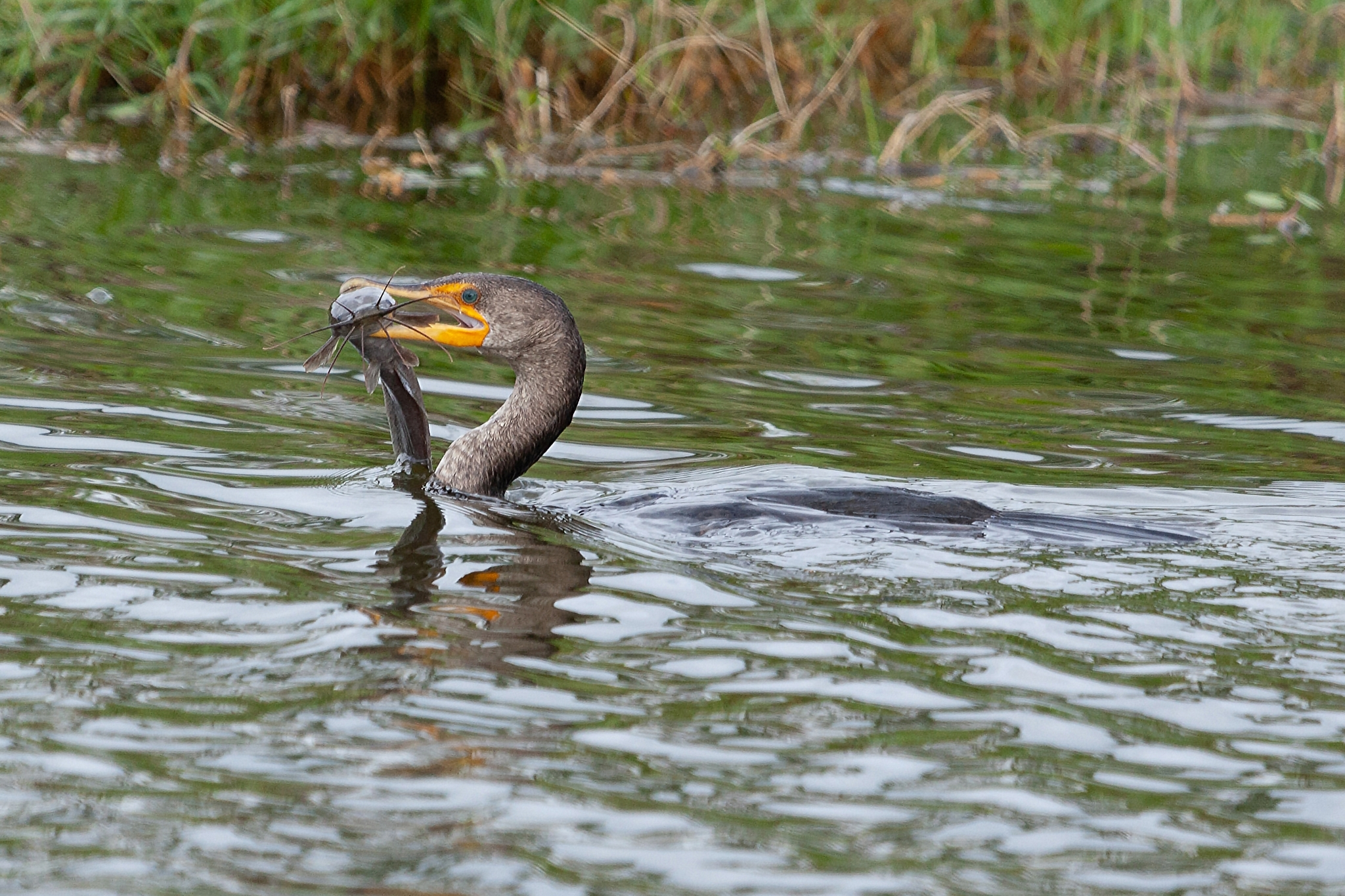
Feeding on an invasive walking catfish, in Florida

Food can be found in the sea, freshwater lakes, and rivers. Like all cormorants, the double-crested dives to find its prey. It mainly eats fish, but will sometimes also eat amphibians, crustaceans and insects. Fish are caught by diving under water. Smaller fish may be eaten while the bird is still beneath the surface but bigger prey is often brought to the surface before it is eaten. Double-crested cormorants are also considered pests to aquaculturists because of their intense predation on fish ponds which can cause thousands of dollars in losses to farmers. Cormorants regurgitate pellets containing undigested parts of their meals such as bones. These pellets can be dissected by biologists in order to discover what the birds ate.

=== Breeding ===
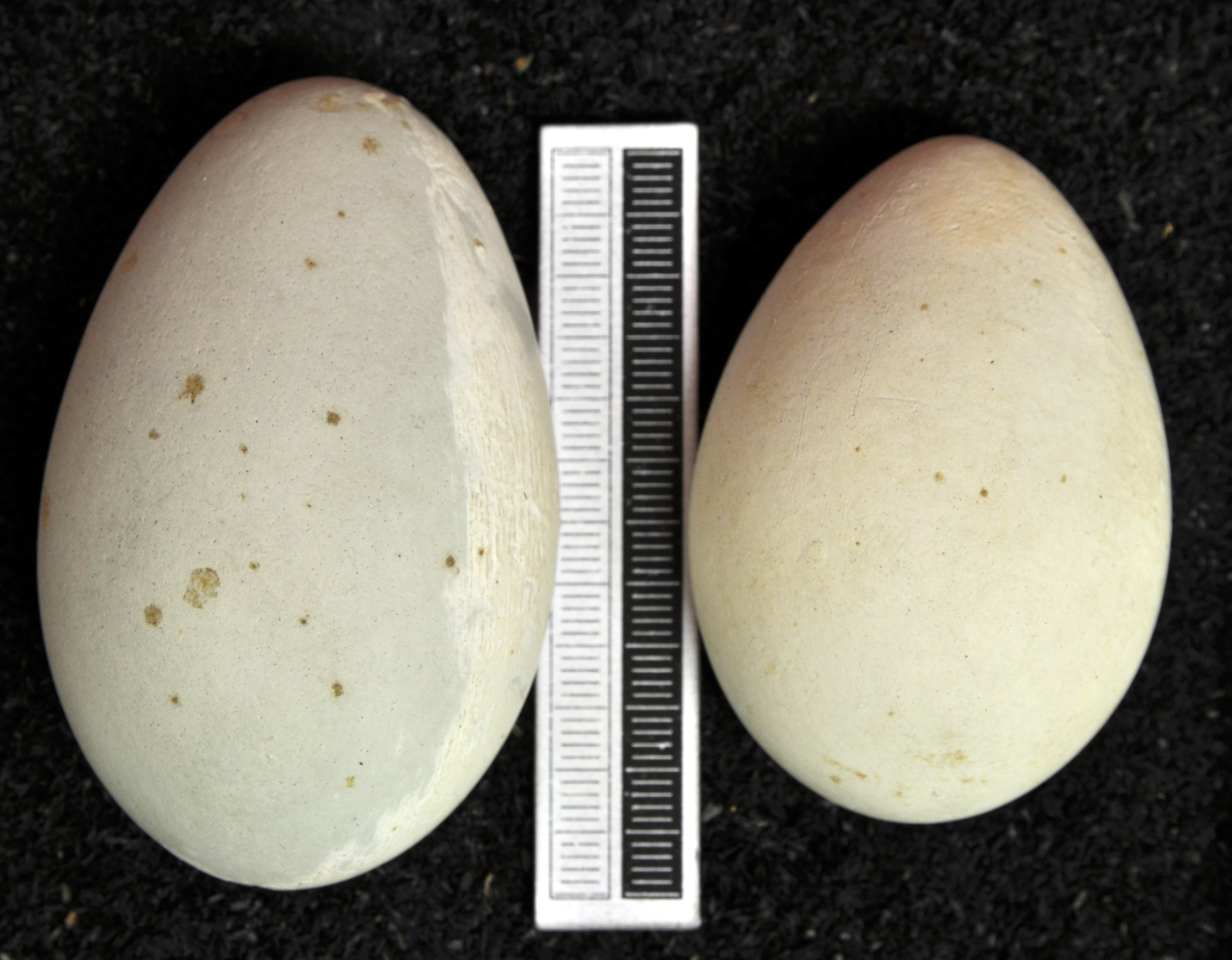
Eggs, Collection Museum Wiesbaden

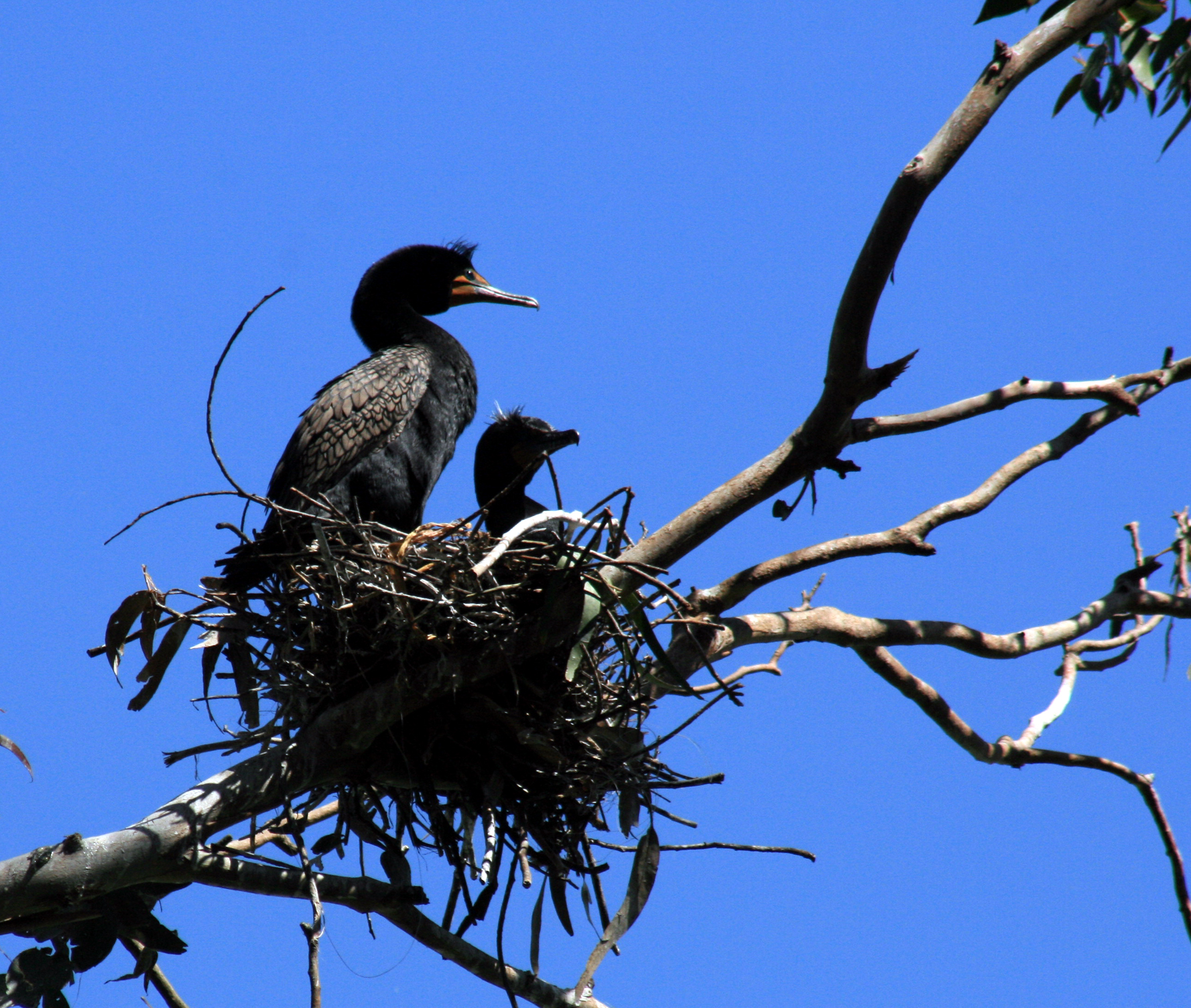
Parent and a chick at the nest

Breeding occurs in coastal areas as well as near inland rivers and lakes. They build stick nests in trees, on cliff edges, or on the ground on suitable islands. They are gregarious birds usually found in colonies, often with other aquatic birds, and have a deep, guttural grunt call.

== Recovery ==
The double-crested cormorant's numbers decreased in the 1960s due to the effects of DDT. Colonies have also been persecuted from time to time in areas where they are thought to compete with human fishing.

Recently the population of double-crested cormorants has increased. Some studies have concluded that the recovery was allowed by the decrease of contaminants, particularly the discontinued use of DDT. The population may have also increased because of aquaculture ponds in its southern wintering grounds. The ponds favor good over-winter survival and growth.

In 1894, Thomas McIlwraith in his book, Birds of Ontario, concludes his section on double-crested cormorants by saying: "When the young are sufficiently grown, they gather into immense flocks in unfrequented sections, and remain until the ice-lid has closed over their food supply, when they go away, not to return till the cover is lifted up in the spring."

For populations nesting in the Great Lakes region, it is believed that the colonization of the lakes by the non-native alewife (a small prey fish) has provided optimal feeding conditions and hence good breeding success. Double-crested cormorants eat other species of fish besides alewives and have been suspected of contributing to the decline of some sport-fish populations in the Great Lakes and other areas.

In light of this belief, and because of calls for action by the public, the United States Fish and Wildlife Service (the U.S. federal government agency charged with their protection) has recently extended control options to some other government entities. This includes culling of populations and egg addling to thwart reproduction, in an effort to control their growing numbers. The U.S. Fish and Wildlife Service retains oversight and the control measures are not extended to the general public (no hunting season).

In May 2008, the Canadian government reduced significantly the number of nests of the birds on Middle Island, a small island in Lake Erie and part of Point Pelee National Park. This is an attempt to keep the small island in balance and preserve its vegetation but opponents to the plan have argued that it is based on faulty information, provided in part by anglers who view cormorants as competitors. As of 2021, the cormorant culling program continues.

In 2020 the government of Ontario introduced a hunting season for double-crested cormorants from 15 September to 31 December, allowing any hunter to kill up to fifteen birds per day.

== Gallery ==
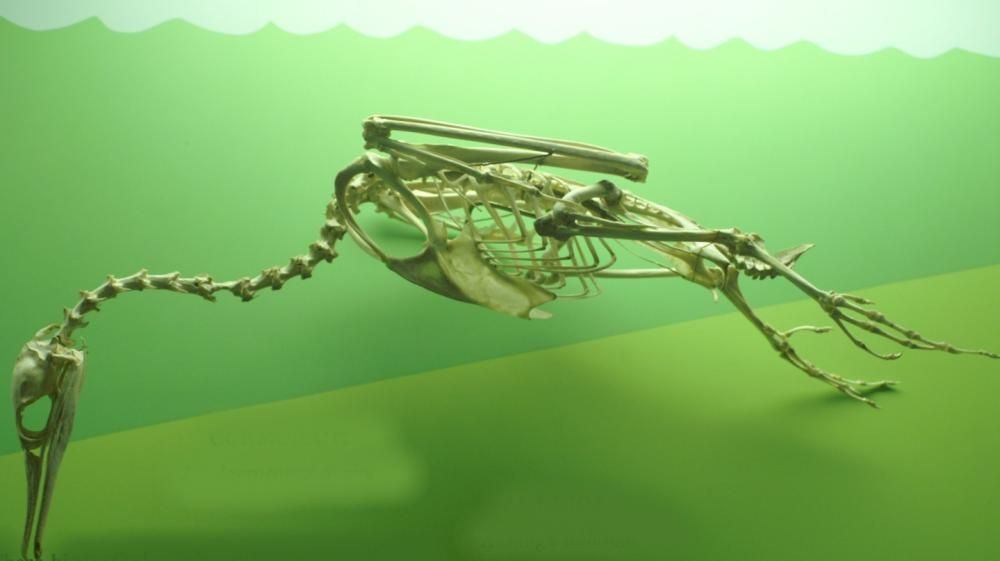
Mounted skeleton of Nannopterum auritum at Smithsonian Museum of Natural History

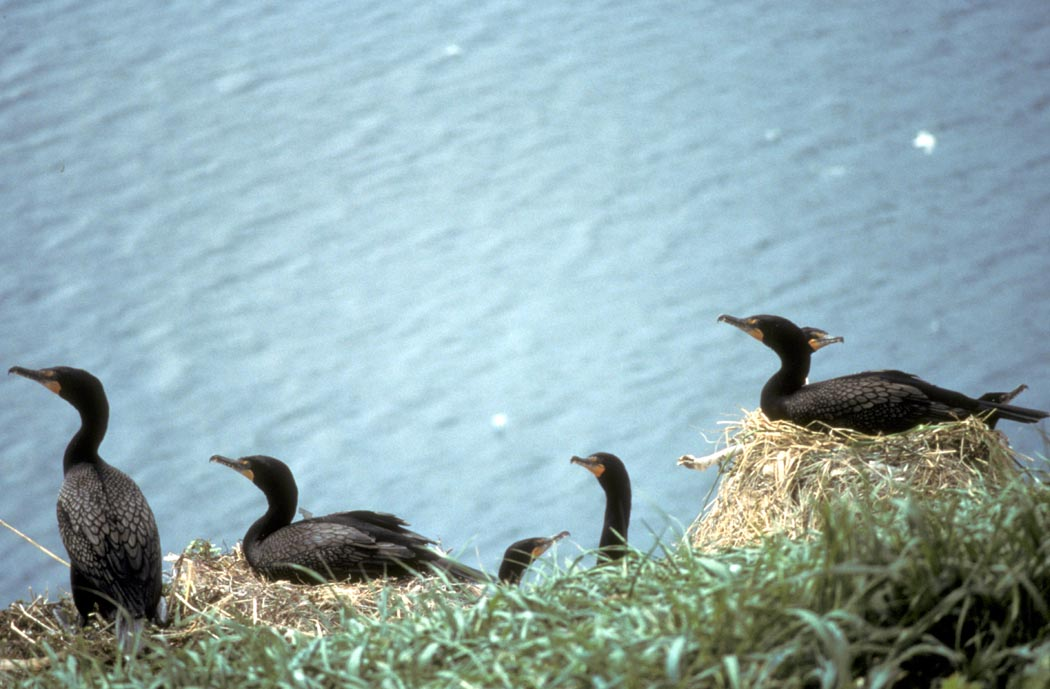
Nesting, Alaska Maritime National Wildlife Refuge

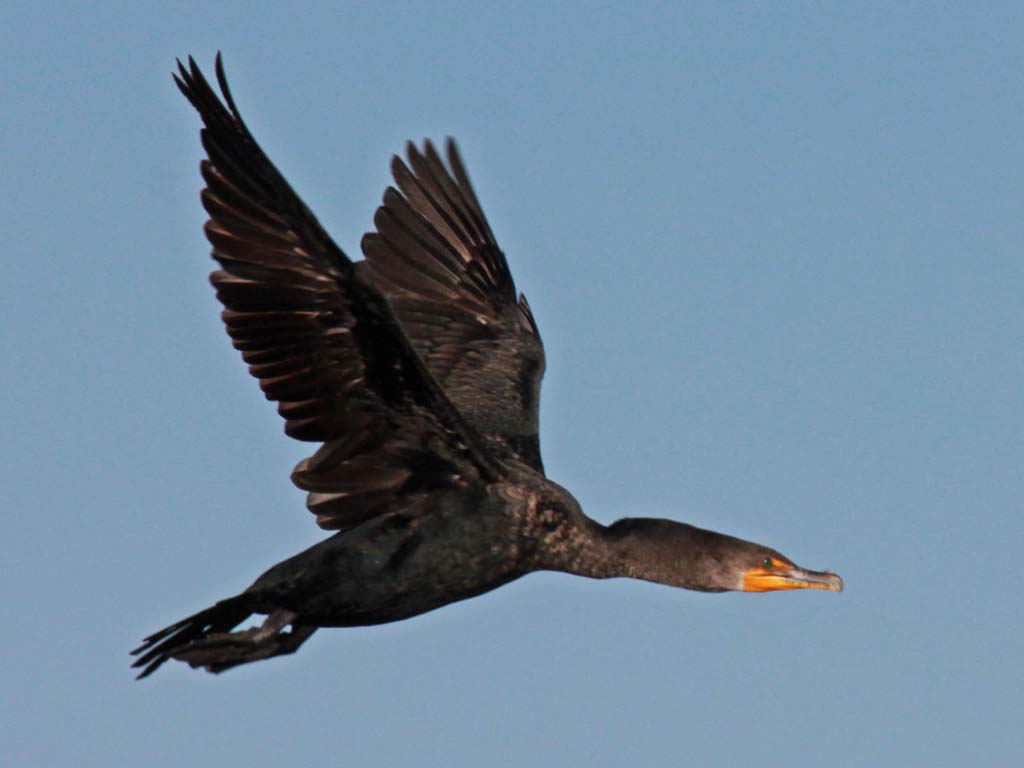
In flight

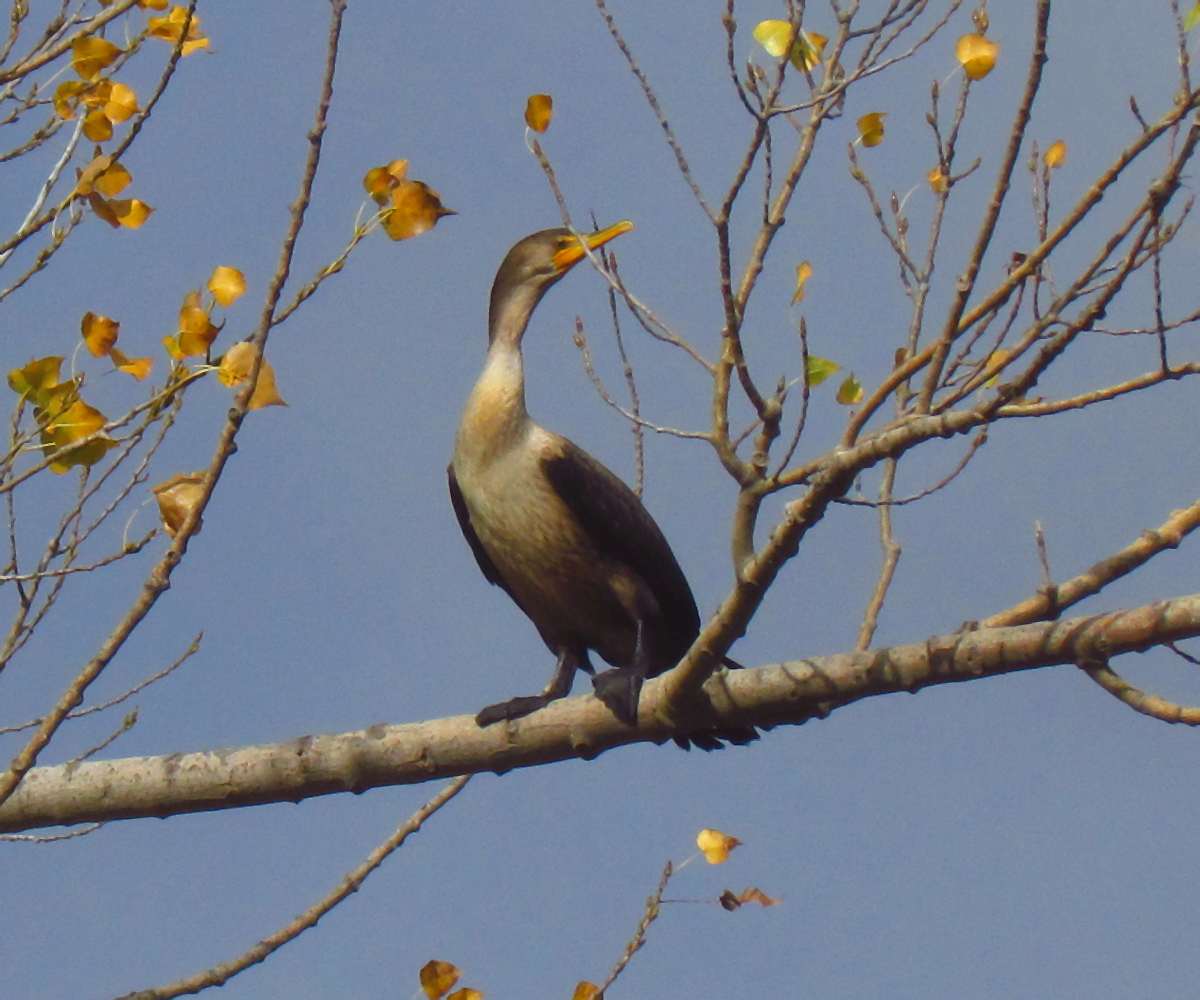
Juvenile

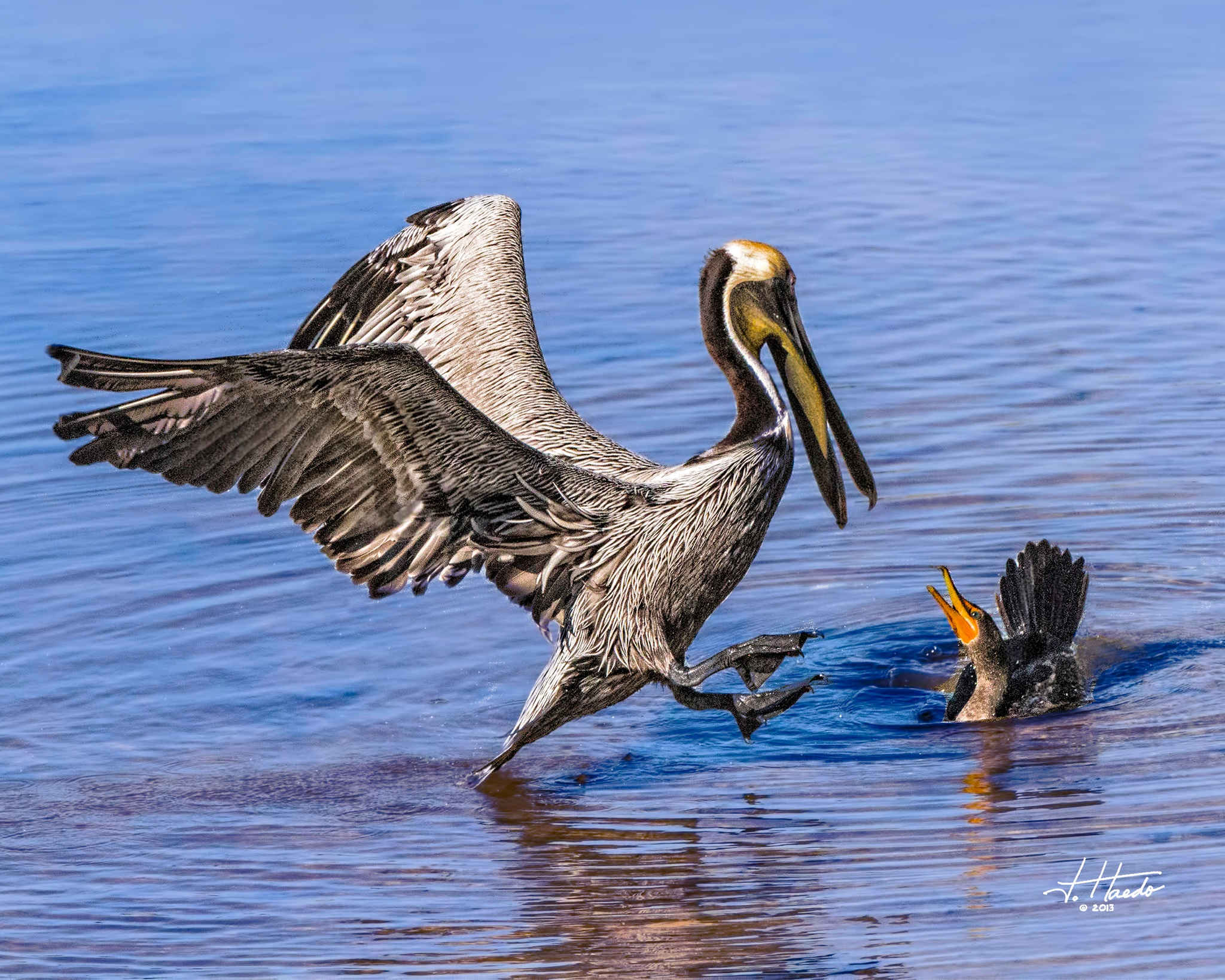
Double-crested cormorant in a confrontation with a brown pelican (Pelicanus occidentalis)

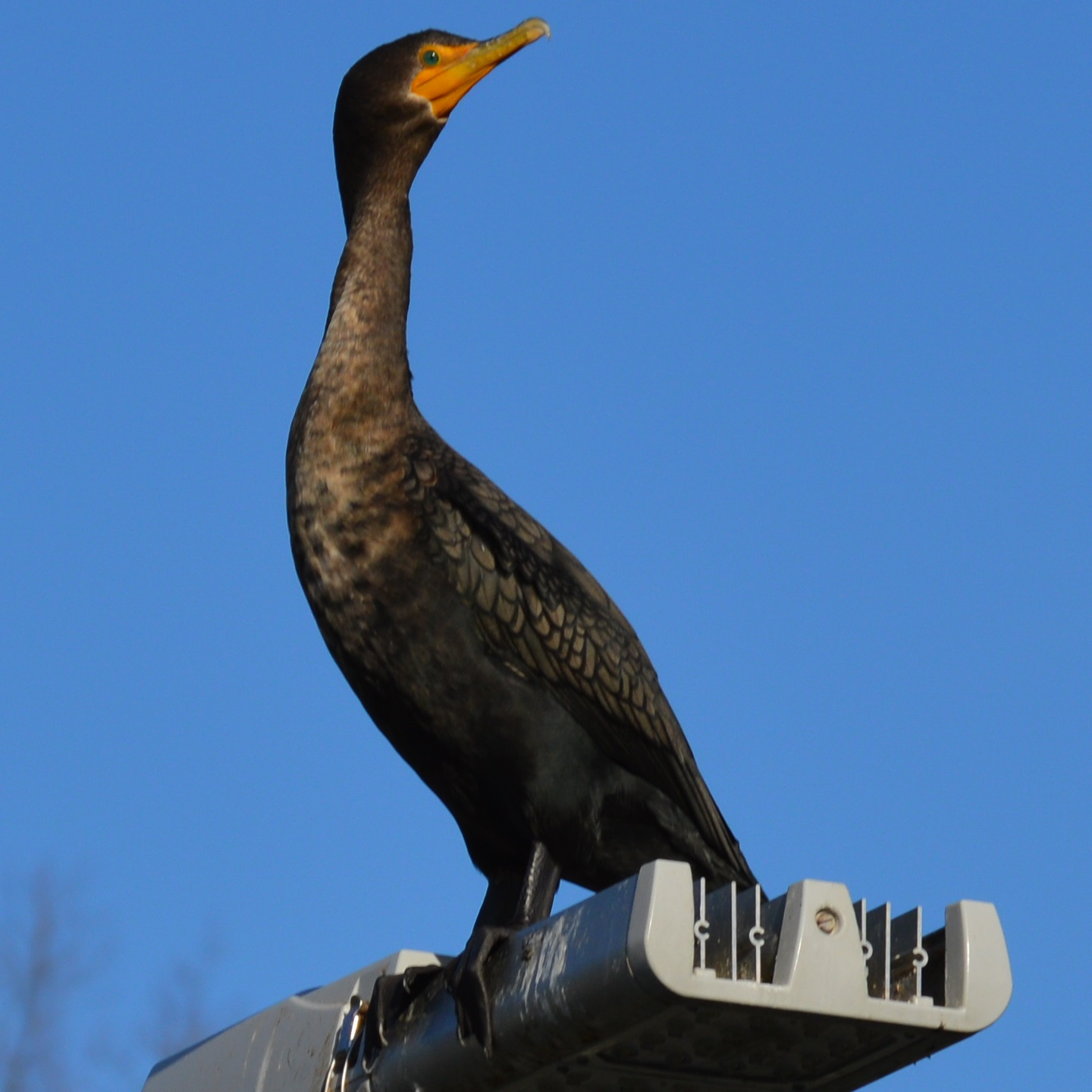
Ballard (Hiram M. Chittenden) Locks, (Seattle, Washington).

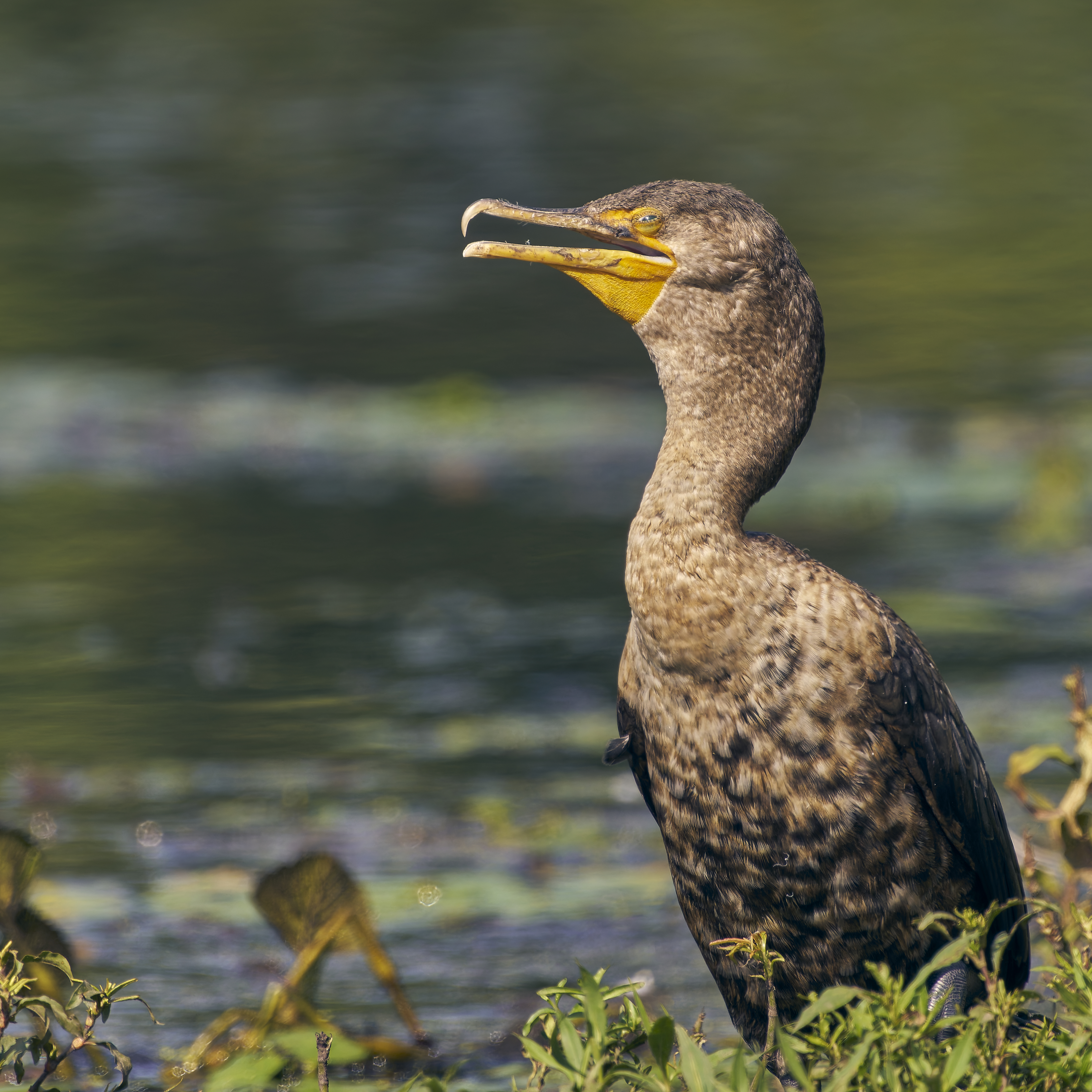
Juvenile in the midst of throat-fluttering
