= Overabundant species =

When the populace of a non-human species exceeds the carrying capacity of its environment

In biology, overabundant species refers to an excessive number of individuals and occurs when the normal population density has been exceeded. Increase in animal populations is influenced by a variety of factors, some of which include habitat destruction or augmentation by human activity, the introduction of invasive species and the reintroduction of threatened species to protected reserves.

Population overabundance can have a negative impact on the environment, and in some cases on the public as well. There are various methods through which populations can be controlled such as hunting, contraception, chemical controls, disease and genetic modification. Overabundant species is an important area of research as it can potentially impact the biodiversity of ecosystems.

Most research studies have examined negative impacts of overabundant species, whereas very few have documented or performed an in-depth examination on positive impacts. As a result, this article focuses on the negative impact of overabundant species.

== Definitions ==
When referring to animals as "overabundant", various definitions apply. The following classes explore the different associations with overabundance:

1. The inconvenience of animals in a certain region or area that threatens human livelihood, for example the tropics are considered to contain an overabundant population of the Anopheles mosquito which carries the malaria parasite.
2. The population density of a preferred species has been reduced by another species population which is then considered as overabundant, for example predator populations of lions and hyenas reducing zebra and wildebeest numbers.
3. A species population within a specific habitat exceeds the carrying capacity, for example national parks reducing herbivore populations to maintain and manage habitat equilibrium.
4. The entire equilibrium consisting of animal and plant organisations is already out of balance, for example existing populations colonising new habitat.

Out of all these classifications, class 4 is considered the most significant due to consequent ecological impacts.

== Causes ==
Overabundance may occur naturally, for example after weather events such as a period of high rainfall in which habitat conditions become optimal. However, other contributing factors include:

=== Anthropogenic disturbances ===
Natural habitats are altered by human activity resulting in habitat fragmentation, decrease in forest densities and wild fires. Other human disturbances include restrictions on hunting, agricultural land modification and predator removal or control within a region or area. The consequent change in land use and the presence or withdrawal of human influence can trigger a rapid increase in both native and non-native species populations.

=== Invasive species can be better adapted to specific environments ===
Invasive species are often overabundant as they outcompete native species for resources such as food and shelter which allows their population to thrive. Other factors influencing population growth include the lack of native predators or the less common presence of the introduced species within native predator habitat.

=== Overabundance due to translocation of threatened species to protected areas ===
Some methods in managing threatened species involve reintroducing species to enclosed reserves or island areas. Once these species are introduced, their populations can become overabundant as these areas serve to protect the targeted species against predators and competitors. This occurred for the Bettongia lesueur, the burrowing bettong, which was reintroduced to the Arid Recovery reserve in Australia: their population has increased from 30 to approximately 1532 individuals. Due to the damage within this reserve their population is considered overabundant.

== Potential impacts ==
Overabundant species can have an adverse impact on ecosystems. Within ecosystems food resources and availability, competitors, and species composition can be negatively impacted on.

=== Impacts of overabundant herbivores ===
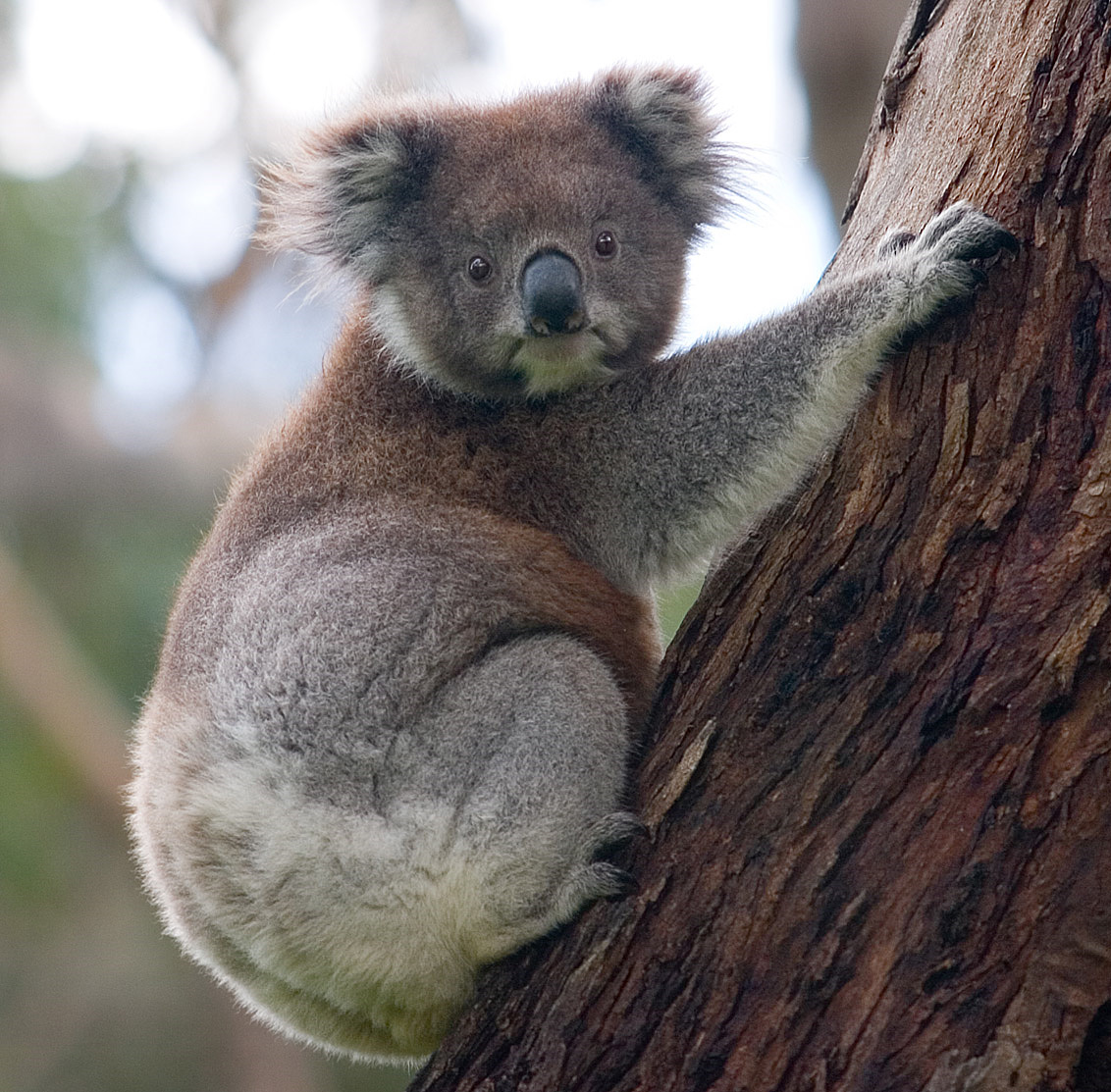
Australian Koala (Phascolarctos cinereus)

A common impact from overabundant herbivores is vegetative damage by overgrazing, where overgrazing refers to the effect of grazing having reached a level where other biodiversity within the ecosystem becomes threatened. Overgrazing can occur in both terrestrial and marine environments and can alter vegetation as well as the composition of vegetation. Population densities and the composition of fauna can also be negatively impacted on. Additionally, permanent ecological damage can be caused by overgrazing before maximum carrying capacity has been reached.

Trophic relationships (i.e. feeding relationships in the ecosystem) can be altered by overabundant species, potentially causing a trophic cascade. Trophic cascades impact vegetation as well as invertebrates (including microorganisms) and birds. Furthermore, predator behaviour and populations may be indirectly affected.

=== Impacts of overabundant predators ===
Overabundant predators are considered harmful to local biodiversity as they prey on native species, compete for resources and can introduce disease. They can decrease native mammal populations and, in some cases, can cause species to become extinct which results in a cascading ecological impact. Examples of invasive species include: "cats (Felis catus), rats (Rattus rattus), mongoose (Urva auropunctata), stoats (Mustela erminea)" and red foxes (Vulpes vulpes). Such species have contributed to the extinction of approximately 58% of modern-day mammals, birds and reptiles.

In Australia, red foxes and feral cats have contributed to many native mammals becoming threatened or extinct which has led to diminished vegetation as foraging mammals have an important ecological role in maintaining a healthy landscape. A particular example is where grassland vegetation diminished to shrub land as a result of seabirds being preyed on by Arctic foxes. Seabirds have an essential ecological role which consists of helping to maintain nutrient levels and soil fertility.

"Invasive predators also threaten 596 species classed as "vulnerable" (217 species), "endangered" (223), or "critically endangered" (156), of which 23 are classed as "possibly extinct."

=== Impact on society ===
It can be very costly to control or eradicate overabundant species. For example, fencing regions as a protective measure against red foxes can cost approximately $10, 000 per kilometre while baiting an area of 35,000^{2} kilometres can cost about $1.3 million.

== Invasive species ==
According to biology, invasive species are non-native animals that are introduced to a region or area outside of their usual habitat. Invasive species can either be introduced intentionally (if they have a beneficial purpose) or non-intentionally.

In general, invasive species that become overabundant most commonly have a negative impact on local biodiversity with little research having found positive effects. Furthermore, an invasive species may have an initial positive benefit that fades as the species become overabundant and the cost of damage control increases.

Invasive species can negatively impact food web structures. In terms of trophic levels, the initial introduction of a non-native species results in a higher species richness whereby the trophic relationships are altered by the additional resource (if an animal is not a predator at the top of the food chain) and consumer. However, the consequent degree of the impact on the local ecosystem once a species becomes overabundant is case dependent as some invasive species, like the brown tree snake in Guam, have caused numerous extinctions of native fauna, while others have had fewer damaging impacts on the environment.

Costs of invasive species are estimated at millions and billions each year.

=== A focus on Australian Wildlife ===
==== Red fox ====
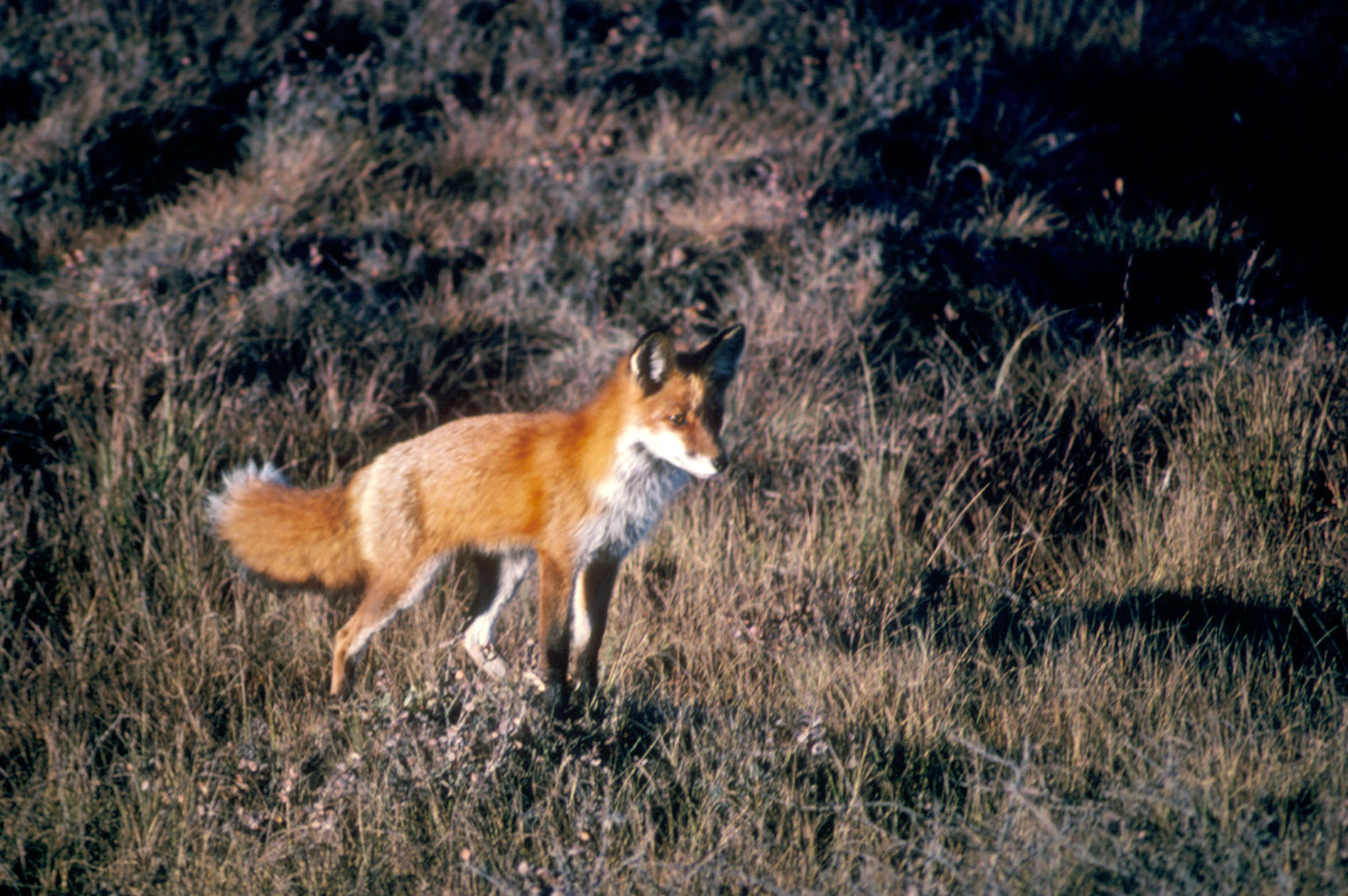
Red fox (Vulpes vulpes)

The red fox, Vulpes Vulpes, was introduced to Australia during the 1870s. The established population has thrived in previous years due to the following factors: adaptability to climate conditions, the ability to live in a wide range of habitats including deserts and forests, and lastly human modification of Australian landscapes which are suitable environments for red foxes to thrive in. Red foxes have mainly had a negative impact on Australian fauna, with the exception of regulated rabbit populations. The diet of red foxes includes a number of threatened native fauna which has contributed to their population declines and extinctions. Furthermore, populations of native fauna, mammals in particular, have increased through fox population control techniques.

==== Rabbit ====
Rabbits were initially introduced to Australia as pets during colonisation. Rabbits pose a threat to native herbivores as they compete for shared resources. Additionally, overgrazing and modification of habitat vegetation by rabbits allow introduced predators to thrive when hunting.

Rabbits have thrived in Australia as they reproduce rapidly, have few predators to regulate their population and the climatic conditions is preferable, especially as the environmental conditions limit diseases that regulate rabbit populations on other continents.

== Methods for controlling overabundant species ==
There are various methods for controlling overabundant populations. Some methods have been used over many years, for example culling, while others such as immunocontraception are still being researched.

=== Culling ===
Culling refers to selective elimination of animals to decrease a population. Two ways of culling involve killing animals by hunting and translocation of animals. Culling of animals may also be an option in reserves established for specific animal conservation as a way of managing their population density, examples include: elephants and hippos.

Target animals can be hunted on the ground or culled by aerial pursuit, with the aim to eliminate the animal in one accurate hit to reduce or limit suffering before death. This method allows a large number of animals to be eliminated within a relatively short amount of time, however shots are not always accurate which can lead to the escape and suffering of individuals.

=== Baiting ===
Baiting is a common method of controlling overabundant populations, it involves the placement of lethal chemicals in food (the bait) that eliminates the animal. It is cost-effective and helps remove a large number of animals from a population, however if ingested by non-target animals it could potentially cause death depending on the type of bait the chemical is administered in, as well as the areas of bait placement.

1080 is a common chemical used in bait. 1080 once ingested causes death by inhibiting the animal's neurological functioning. It consists of an enzyme that native Australian fauna is tolerant to, however it can still be lethal if ingested.

=== Fumigation ===
Fumigation, which involves the spreading of poisonous gas, helps to selectively kill a large number of animals. It is a method used to control rabbit and fox populations in Australia by spraying a lethal chemical into warrens and dens. Chemicals used include phosphine for rabbits and carbon monoxide for foxes, both of which induce suffering prior to death.

Difficulties with fumigation include pinpointing individual dens and warrens, which can be both time-consuming and hard work, as well as the restricted time period during which animals regularly inhabit their dens, for example during spring when offspring are born.

=== Disease ===
This method is used on select animals and is species specific, such as to control the rabbit population in Australia. It involves spreading a disease, for example "rabbit calicivirus disease", through bait or through capture and release programs. The aim is to have the disease spread through the targeted species population to reduce their numbers. Death may take up to 1 or 2 weeks in which the animal suffers from symptoms such as fever, loss of appetite and lethargy.

=== Contraception ===
Two methods for managing fertility in overabundant wildlife include the employment of biotechnology such as immunocontraception, and surgery to neuter males or spay females. There are various factors that impact the effectiveness of contraceptive methods, some of which include: expense, longevity of the treatment effect, level of difficulty in administering the treatment, and whether or not the method has a negative impact on the individual or other species in the environment.

An example of an immune-contraceptive is gonadotropin releasing hormone (GnRH). Studies have been conducted on various animals, for example white-tailed deer and cats, of which have shown that GnRH can be effective in reducing short term fertility.

==== Immunocontraception ====
Immunocontraception causes animals to become infertile which helps to control and reduce overabundant populations. Two methods of administration include vaccines and chemical implants. In some studies immunocontraception has shown to effectively reduce pregnancy rates, however this method is both time-consuming and expensive due to further research required to overcome challenges such as longevity of the contraceptive effect.

==== Surgery ====
This method can be effective in small populations as it is fairly accessible, however the procedure is costly, invasive as well as the individual being at risk of infection after surgery. Surgical sterilisation is permanent, as a result it may not be appropriate for use in native populations due to the risk of potentially losing genetic variation.
