= Goose egg addling =

Wildlife management method of population control

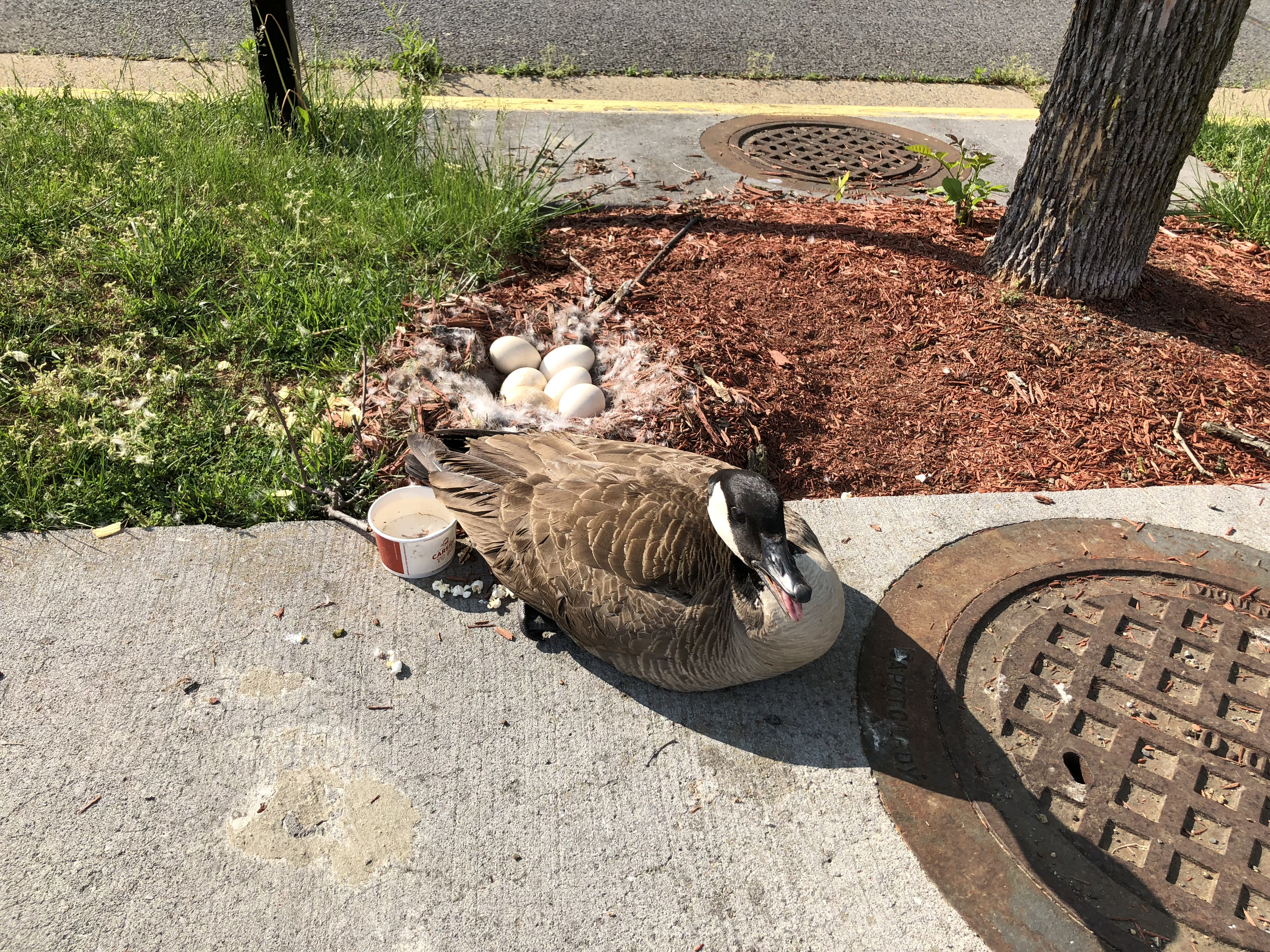
A Canada goose guarding its eggs in an Applebee's parking lot in Virginia

Goose egg addling is a wildlife management method of population control for Canada geese and other bird species. The process of addling involves temporarily removing fertilized eggs from the nest, testing for embryo development, killing the embryo, and placing the egg back in the nest. Returning the egg to the nest misleads the goose into believing the egg is still developing. Otherwise, the goose would begin laying again.

In order to work effectively, addling must be conducted in a manner that does not arouse the suspicion of the goose, and must not change the odor, appearance or texture of the egg. Effective addling techniques are condoned by Humane World for Animals and Internet Center for Wildlife Damage Management. The most popular addling method is egg oiling, which entails coating the egg in vegetable oil, thereby depriving the embryo of oxygen and killing it.

== Methods ==
=== Types of addling ===
The most common method of egg addling is oiling, in which an egg is coated with an oil (usually food-grade) to deprive the embryo of oxygen, preventing it from forming any further. In Canada geese and cormorants, 100% corn oil is used, as it is relatively cheap compared to other oils. Other oils known to be effective include castor, linseed, safflower, soybean, and white mineral oil.

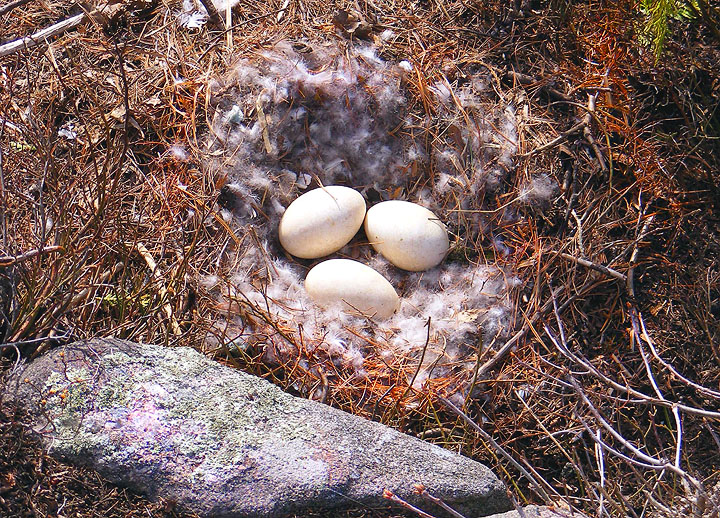
Canada goose eggs, like these, may be coated with vegetable oil to prevent them from developing.

In addition to oiling, eggs may be shaken or punctured. Puncturing is considered less reliable by the U.S. Animal and Plant Health Inspection Service, and so it is not used as often. Shaking is also unpopular as, if done incorrectly, it can result in the hatching of deformed goslings.

OvoControl G is a drug containing nicarbazin, originally developed as a drug for treating coccidiosis in chickens, that comes in a wheat-based bread which the bird takes orally. It has been proposed for Canada goose control, as its side effects include reduced clutch numbers and a low hatch rate. Unlike egg oiling, OvoControl G does not require nests to be tracked down, and fewer people are needed to lay the bait, giving it an advantage over oiling.

=== Implementation ===
Addling must be done early in an egg's development, or else the embryo will be too far along for the oil to have an effect. The date varies depending on the bird. A Canada goose egg is generally considered too far along for addling at 14 days. A study on herring gull eggs using petroleum found that if an egg is 28 days past laying, even as much as 100 μl of petroleum will fail to have an effect. Egg age is determined by doing a "float test". The egg is placed in a bucket of water, and if it sinks, it is young enough to be addled. A floating egg is too old. Additionally, if an egg has a crack in it, the entire nest it is in must be left alone.

Locating nests and addling the eggs can be labor intensive, and may discourage its implementation. Many egg addling programs rely on volunteers to find nests and treat eggs. Some places, such as British Columbia's Okangan Valley, may have a hotline or email address with which the public can report a goose or nest sighting.

== Use in Canada goose control ==
=== History ===
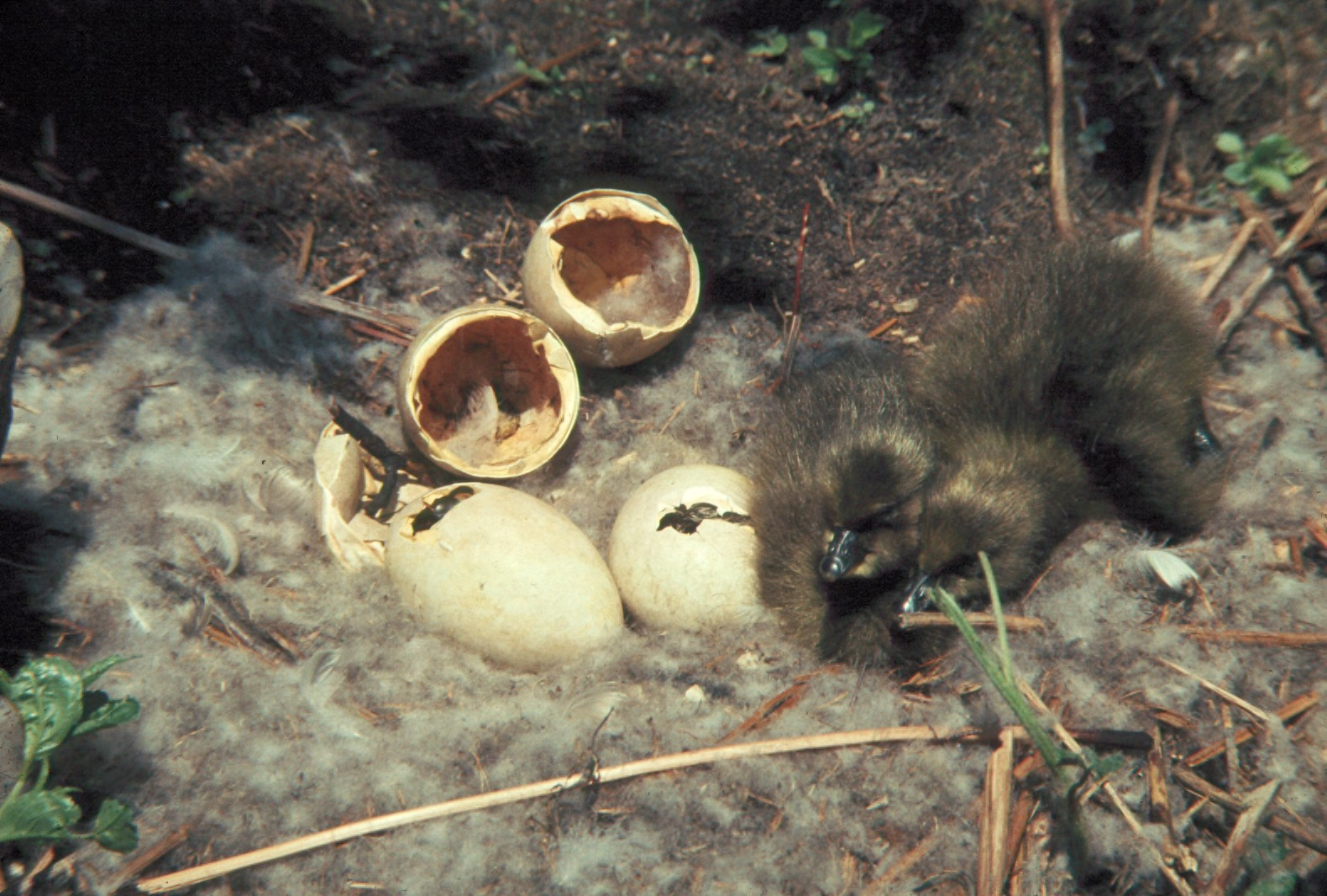
A Canada goose nest with goslings. Geese will remain on their nests even after the period addled eggs were supposed to hatch.

The crash of US Airways Flight 1549 on January 15, 2009, after an investigation, was found to have been caused by a bird strike of Canada geese. Subsequently, public opinion on the Canada goose shifted towards hostility, with publications such as The New York Post calling for reductions in the birds' populations. Even among animal rights groups, which generally oppose culling, the sentiment that numbers should be reduced was shared, with egg oiling proposed as a humane way to achieve the goal. In the following weeks, an estimated 1,739 goose eggs were coated with oil in an effort to prevent any similar incidents from occurring.

=== Effects on geese ===
After their eggs have been oiled, geese will remain at their nests, even well after the time the eggs would have hatched. Depending on the desired outcome, this can be seen as a pro or a con. If the goal is to keep geese isolated, oiling would be a good solution, but if the goal is to get geese to leave the area, oiling would be a poor choice.

== Use in other species ==
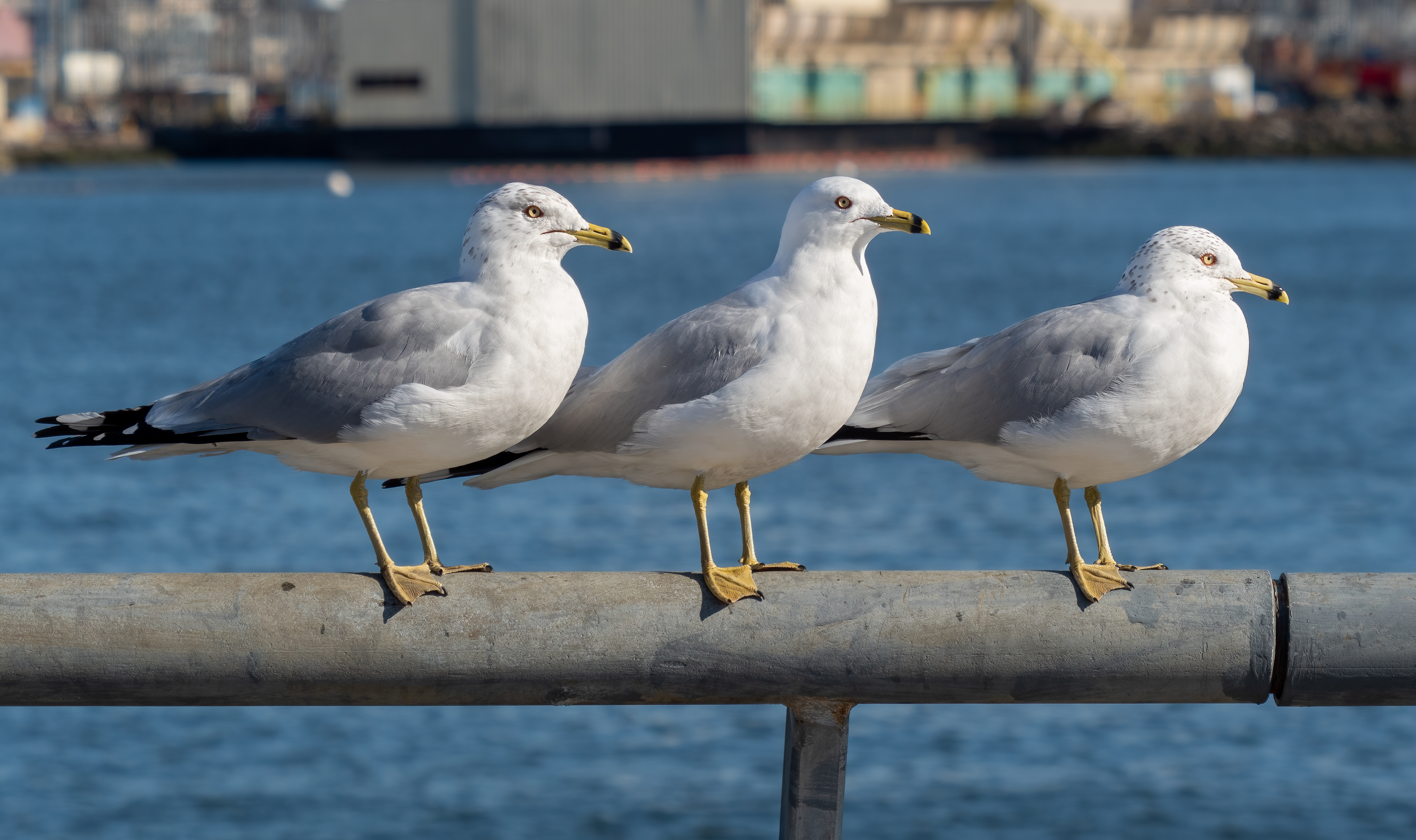
Egg oiling has been used to control ring-billed gulls, with mixed results.

Since the 1980s, egg oiling has been used to control American herring gulls. Unlike Canada geese, the gulls usually abandon their nests if the eggs fail to hatch, and their clutches are generally more likely to be lost to predators if they have been oiled. Ring-billed gulls have also been managed in this way, though results have been mixed; one study found that colonies do not leave the treated area, and the authors did not recommend oiling as a control method, while another found that it caused a population decrease and called the oiling "beneficial".

Double-crested cormorants are very frequently targeted for egg addling, as their fish diet is viewed as a threat by the angling and aquaculture industries, and because they produce acidic guano that can damage property. When their eggs are oiled, most cormorants will not renest, and those that do are often unsuccessful. Egg oiling is more cost effective than culling, further adding to its desirability as a management technique. Oiling of cormorant eggs, however, is ineffective if enough fish (especially aquaculture escapees) are available to sustain the population.

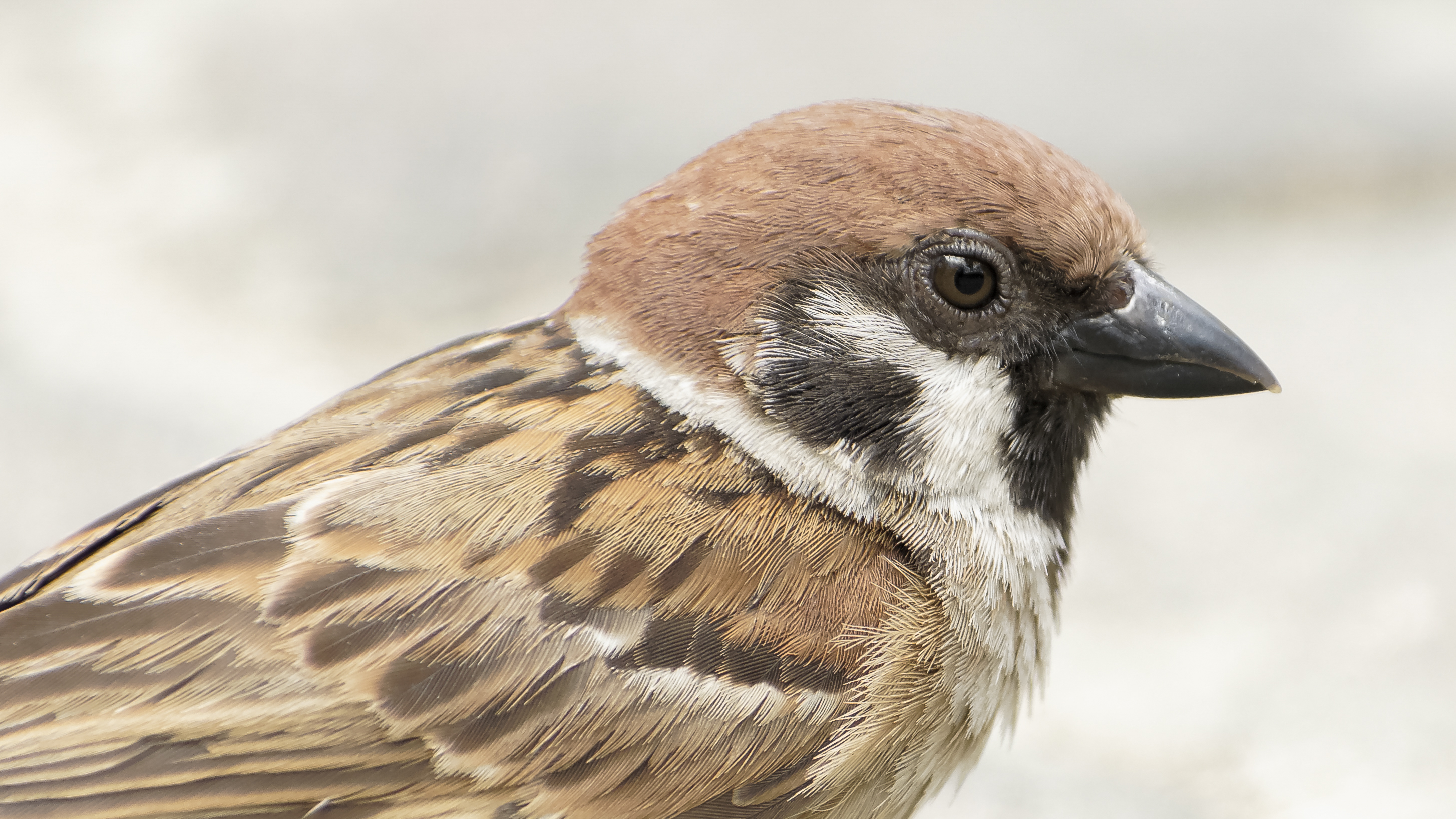
House sparrows are invasive in North America, and addling their eggs is one way of reducing their impact on the environment.

Egg addling can also be used to control predatory birds. When a population of common ravens gets too large, it can lead to increased predation and population decline on other birds. Raven eggs are thus oiled to allow the prey birds to recover their populations.

In addition to managing native nuisance species, oiling can be used to prevent the further spread of invasive species. House sparrows, invasive in North America, have been controlled by treating their eggs with canola oil. This results in a complete prevention of hatching. The Cornell Lab of Ornithology recommends oiling as a management solution for house sparrows and European starlings.

== Ethics ==
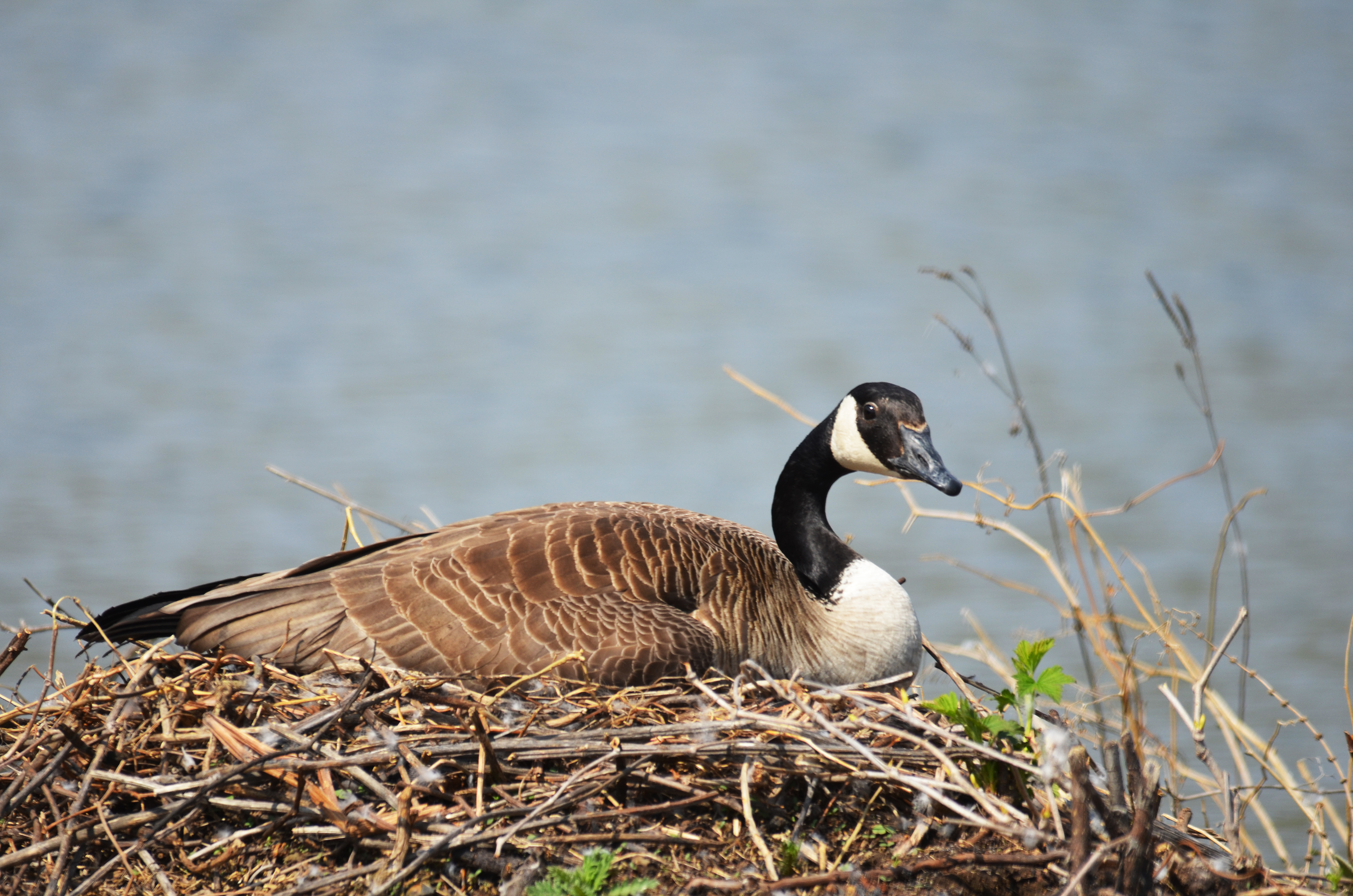
A Canada goose on a nest. Oiling of Canada goose eggs is generally considered humane if done before day 14 of incubation.

Many animal rights and welfare groups support egg addling as a humane alternative to other forms of goose control, such as culling. Humane World for Animals supports egg oiling before the embryo is viable, and also supports removing eggs from the nest and replacing them with ceramics. People for the Ethical Treatment of Animals also endorses egg oiling, though it discourages puncturing or shaking. Both organizations consider addling after the egg is 14 days old to be inhumane.

In 2021, the city of Rochester, Minnesota, planned a volunteer-based egg addling program in Silver Lake Park. It was met with opposition by writer Greg Munson, who was concerned that after oiling, "there will be a handful of days, I'm guessing, not minutes or hours that that gosling will be suffocating before it dies, if it does die." He further added that replacing eggs with ceramics would be more ethical. On the day of the addling, at least 25 people came in person to protest. The next year, egg oiling was done again, but with no protests reported.

=== Legality ===
In North America, birds protected under the Migratory Bird Treaty Act cannot be harmed or harassed; this applies to eggs and nests. The treaty does not include invasive species. In the United States, agricultural operations, homeowner's associations, and public land managers may addle eggs with federal permission. The United States Fish and Wildlife Service has a registration program for such cases. Permits can be for the short-term or long-term. Short-term permits have been found other than be less effective, as the permit holders tend to treat just 5 or fewer nest on average, compared to the average 20 to 50 nests a long-term permit holder treats.
