= Shag =

Shag or Shags may refer to:

== Animals ==
- Shag or cormorant, a bird family
  - European shag, a specific species of the shag or cormorant family
  - Great cormorant another species of the family

== Persons ==
- Shag (artist), stage name of the American artist Josh Agle (born 1962)
- Shag, a name used on some pop records in the early 1970s by British record producer Jonathan King
- Shags Horan (1895–1969), American baseball player
- Shag (name), multiple persons
- Shag, fictional character from Road Rovers

== Arts, entertainment, and media ==
=== Music ===
- The Shag, also known as The Shags (one of many bands of that name) or Shag, a 1960s garage and psychedelic rock band from Milwaukee
- The Shags (Connecticut band), a 1960s rock band from Connecticut

=== Dance ===
- Carolina shag, a swing dance that originated in South Carolina in the 1940s and still is their state dance
- Collegiate shag, a swing dance that originated in the 1920s (popular in the 1930s and 40s)
- St. Louis shag, a swing dance that evolved from the Charleston

=== Other uses in arts, entertainment, and media ===
- Shag (film), a 1989 film

== Other uses ==
- Shag (fabric), a fabric typically used to make deep-pile carpets
- Shag (hairstyle)
- Shag (tobacco), fine-cut tobacco
- Shag, a party and fundraiser for an engaged couple, also known as a stag and doe

== See also ==
- Shag Island (disambiguation)
- Shag Rocks (disambiguation)
- Shaggy (disambiguation)
- The Shaggs
- Shagging (baseball), the practice of chasing and catching fly balls as a part of baseball batting practice
