= Shag Island =

Shag Island may refer to:

- Shag Island (South Australia), South Australia
- Shag Reef, Tasmania, Australia
- Tarahiki Island, also known as Shag Island, Hauraki Gulf, New Zealand
- Shag Islands, Newfoundland, Canada
- Shag Islet, a small island 10 km north of Heard Island.

== See also ==
- Shag Rock (disambiguation)
- Shag Rocks (disambiguation)
- Shag Reef
