= Shug =

Shug may refer to:

== People ==
- Big Shug, American rapper
- Shug from Otis & Shug, American singing duo
- Shug Jordan
- Shug Fisher, American actor
- Shug Knight
- Shug McGaughey

== Other ==
- Sahawiq, hot sauce

== See also ==
- Shag (disambiguation)
