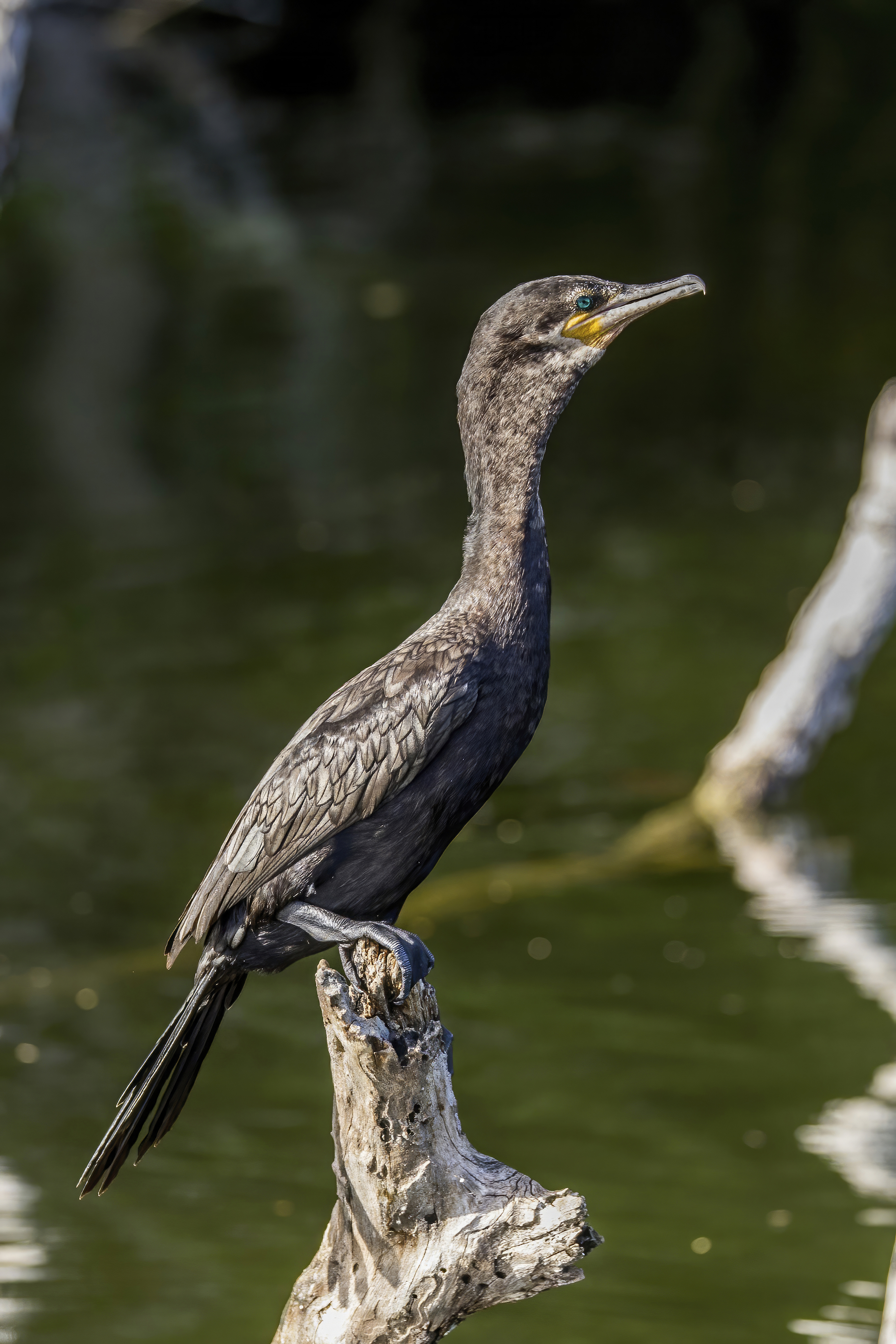
- N. b. mexicanum Guatemala

Conservation status
- Least Concern (IUCN 3.1)

Scientific classification
- Kingdom: Animalia
- Phylum: Chordata
- Class: Aves
- Order: Suliformes
- Family: Phalacrocoracidae
- Genus: Nannopterum
- Species: N. brasilianum

Binomial name
- Nannopterum brasilianum (Gmelin, 1789)
- Range of Nannopterum brasilianum

Synonyms
- Phalacrocorax olivaceus (Humboldt, 1805); Phalacrocorax pampeanus Moreno & Mercerat, 1891; Phalacrocorax vigua Phalacrocorax brasilianus Nannopterum olivaceus Nannopterum vigum Nannopterum pampeanum Nesocarbo brasilianum Nesocarbo olivaceus Nesocarbo vigum Nesocarbo pampeanum

= Neotropic cormorant =

Species of bird

The neotropic cormorant or olivaceous cormorant (Nannopterum brasilianum) is a medium-sized cormorant found throughout the American tropics and subtropics, from the middle Rio Grande and the Gulf and Californian coasts of the United States south through Mexico and Central America to southern South America, where it is called by the indigenous name of biguá. It also breeds in the Bahamas, Cuba, and Trinidad. It can be found both on coasts (including some mangrove areas) and in inland waters. There are at least two subspecies: N. b. mexicanum from Nicaragua northwards and N. b. brasilianum further south. In Peru, the neotropic cormorant is used by the Uru people for fishing.

== Taxonomy ==
The neotropic cormorant was documented in 1658 by the Dutch naturalist Willem Piso after travels in Brazil. This formed the basis for the formal description and naming of the species by Johann Friedrich Gmelin in 1789. He placed it with the petrels in the genus Procellaria and coined the binomial name Procellaria brasiliana. Many authors preferred to use Alexander von Humboldt's 1805 description of Pelecanus olivaceus because the identity of Piso's birds was considered uncertain. Later, ornithological authorities such as the American Ornithologists' Union began to use Phalacrocorax brasilianus after Ralph Browning argued that Piso's description and paintings do indeed refer to the neotropic cormorant.

The neotropic cormorant was formerly placed in the genus Phalacrocorax. A molecular phylogenetic study of the cormorants published in 2014 found that the neotropic cormorant, the double-crested cormorant, and the flightless cormorant formed a clade that was sister to the genus Leucocarbo. The three species were, therefore, moved to the resurrected genus Nannopterum that had been introduced in 1899 by English ornithologist Richard Bowdler Sharpe to accommodate the flightless cormorant. The genus name Nannopterum combines the Ancient Greek nannos meaning "dwarf" with pteron meaning "wing".

Two subspecies are recognised:

- N. b. mexicanum (Brandt, JF, 1837) – inland and coastal Great Plains (central USA) from South Dakota and Kansas to the Gulf of Mexico, and Mexico to Nicaragua; Bahamas and Cuba
- N. b. brasilianum (Gmelin, JF, 1789) – inland and coastal Costa Rica to Tierra del Fuego

== Description ==
This bird is 64 cm (25 in) long with a 100 cm (39 in) wingspan. Adult males weigh from 1.1 to 1.5 kg (2.4 to 3.3 lb), adult females 50 to 100 g (1.8 to 3.5 oz) less. Birds of the southern populations tend to be bigger than the more northerly birds. It is small and slender, especially compared to the larger, heavier-looking double-crested cormorant. It has a long tail and frequently holds its neck in an S-shape. Adult plumage is mainly black, with a yellow-brown throat patch. During breeding, white tufts appear on the sides of the head, there are scattered white filoplumes on the side of the head and the neck, and the throat patch develops a white edge. The upper wings are somewhat grayer than the rest of the body. Juveniles are brownish in color.

== Behaviour ==
Unlike other cormorants, this bird can often be seen perching on wires.

=== Food and feeding ===
Its diet consists mainly of small fish, but will also eat tadpoles, frogs, aquatic insects (such as dragonfly nymphs), and shrimp. Information about its prey is sparse, but inland birds seem to feed on small, abundant fish in ponds and sheltered inlets, less than 10 cm (3.9 in) in length, with an individual weight of a gram or two, such as Poecilia species especially the sailfin molly Poecilia latipinna. This cormorant forages for food by diving underwater, propelling itself by its feet. Its dives are brief, between 5 and 15 seconds. It is also known to forage in groups, with several birds beating the water with their wings to drive fish forward into shallows.

=== Breeding ===
Neotropic cormorants are monogamous and breed in colonies. The nest is a platform of sticks with a depression in the center circled with twigs and grass. It is built a few meters above the ground or water in bushes or trees. Up to five chalky, bluish-white eggs are laid. Most pairs lay three eggs, but the mean number hatched is less than two. The eggs soon become nest-stained. Both sexes incubate for about 25–30 days, and both parents feed the young until around the 11th week. By week 12, they are independent. One brood is raised per year.

This bird is largely a permanent resident, with some birds occasionally wandering north in the warmer months.

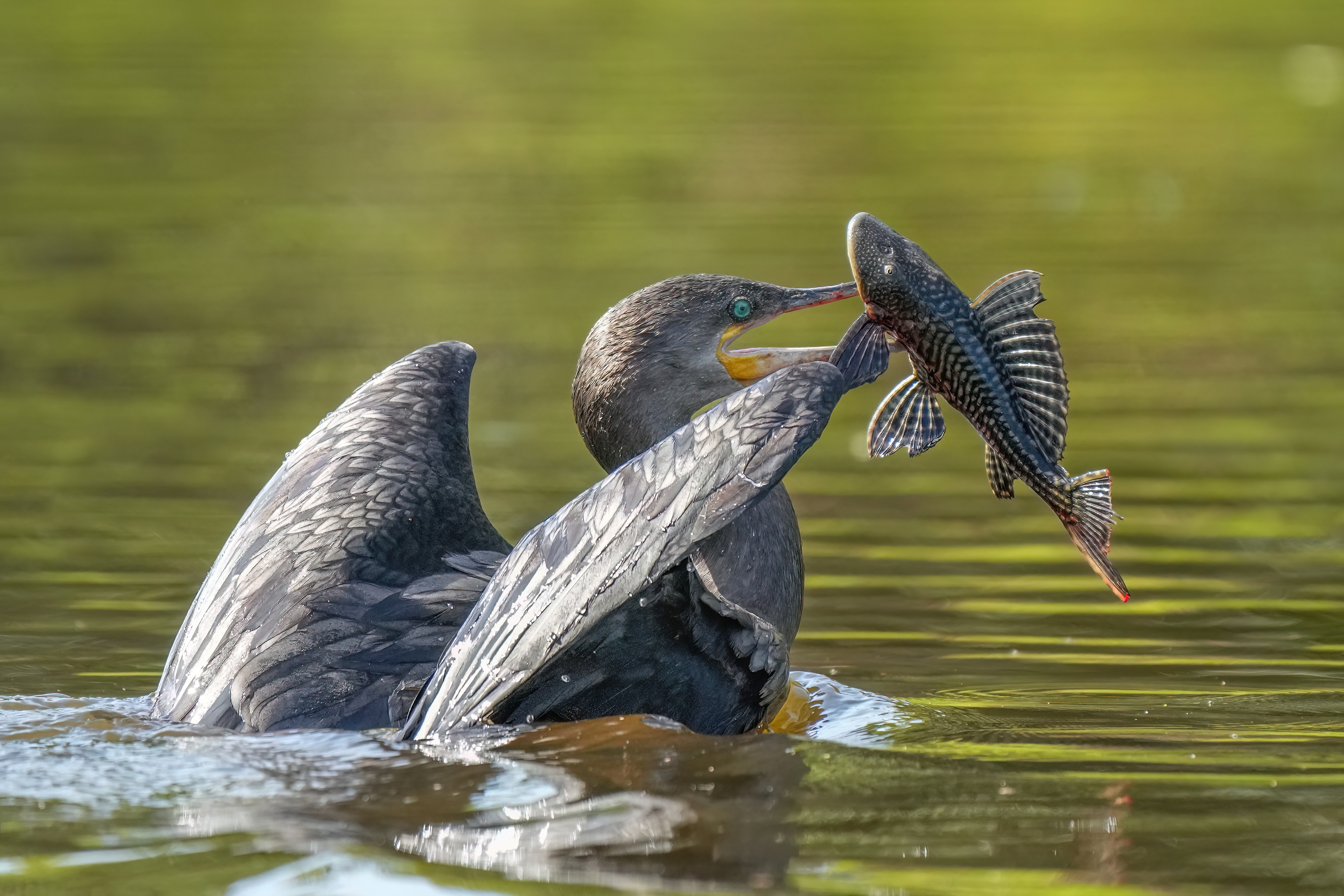
With a freshly caught Snow king pleco

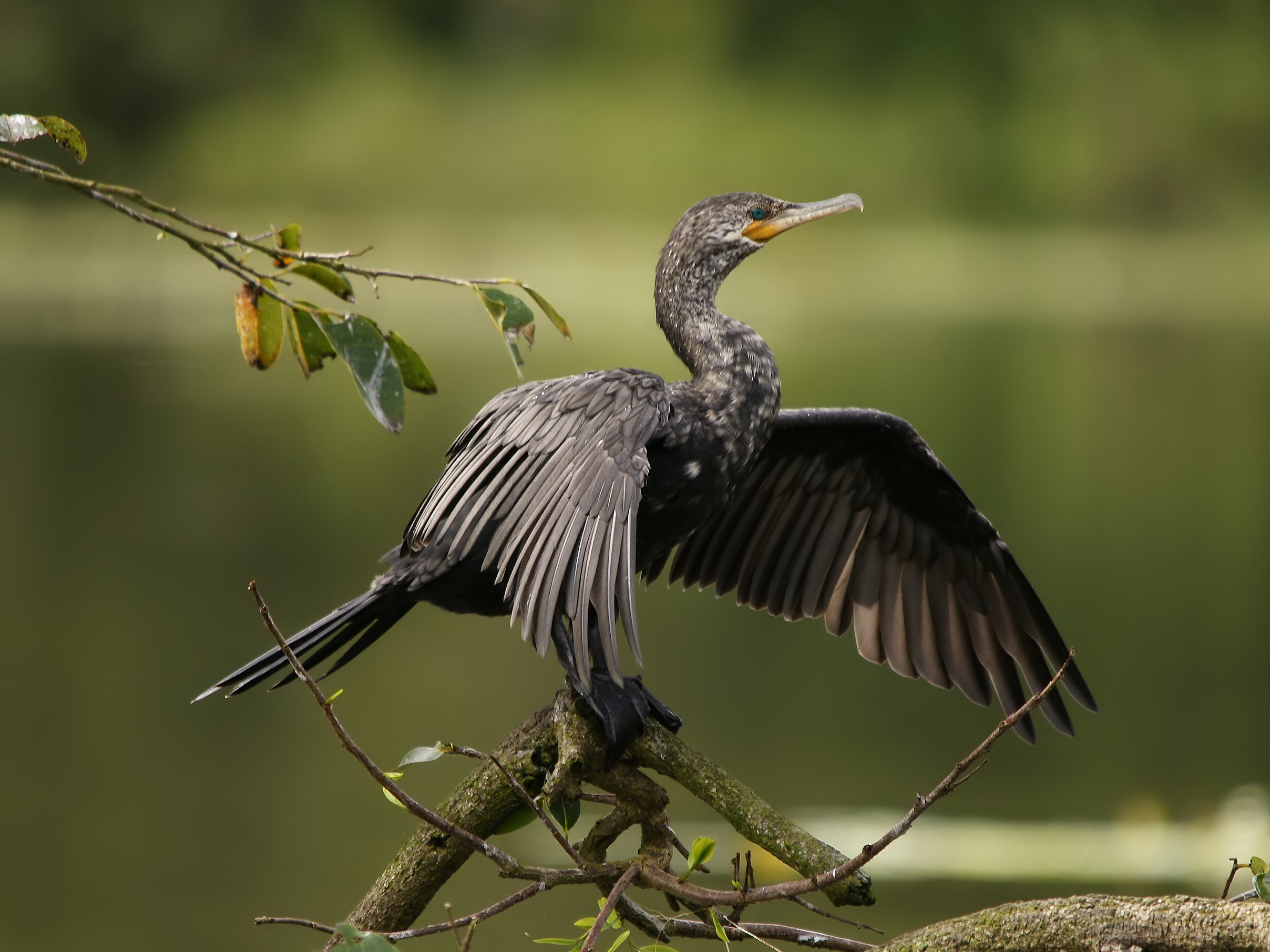
In Costa Rica

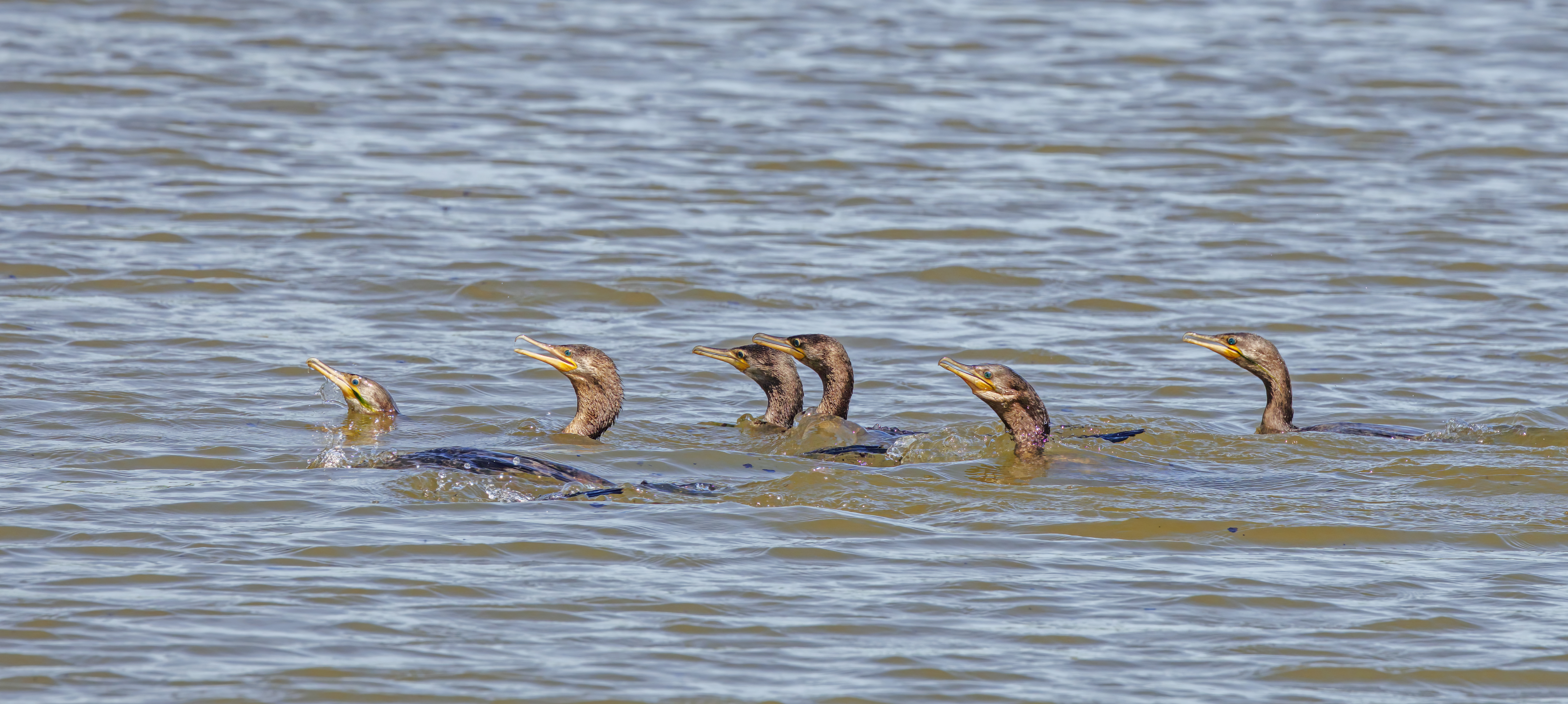
in Argentina

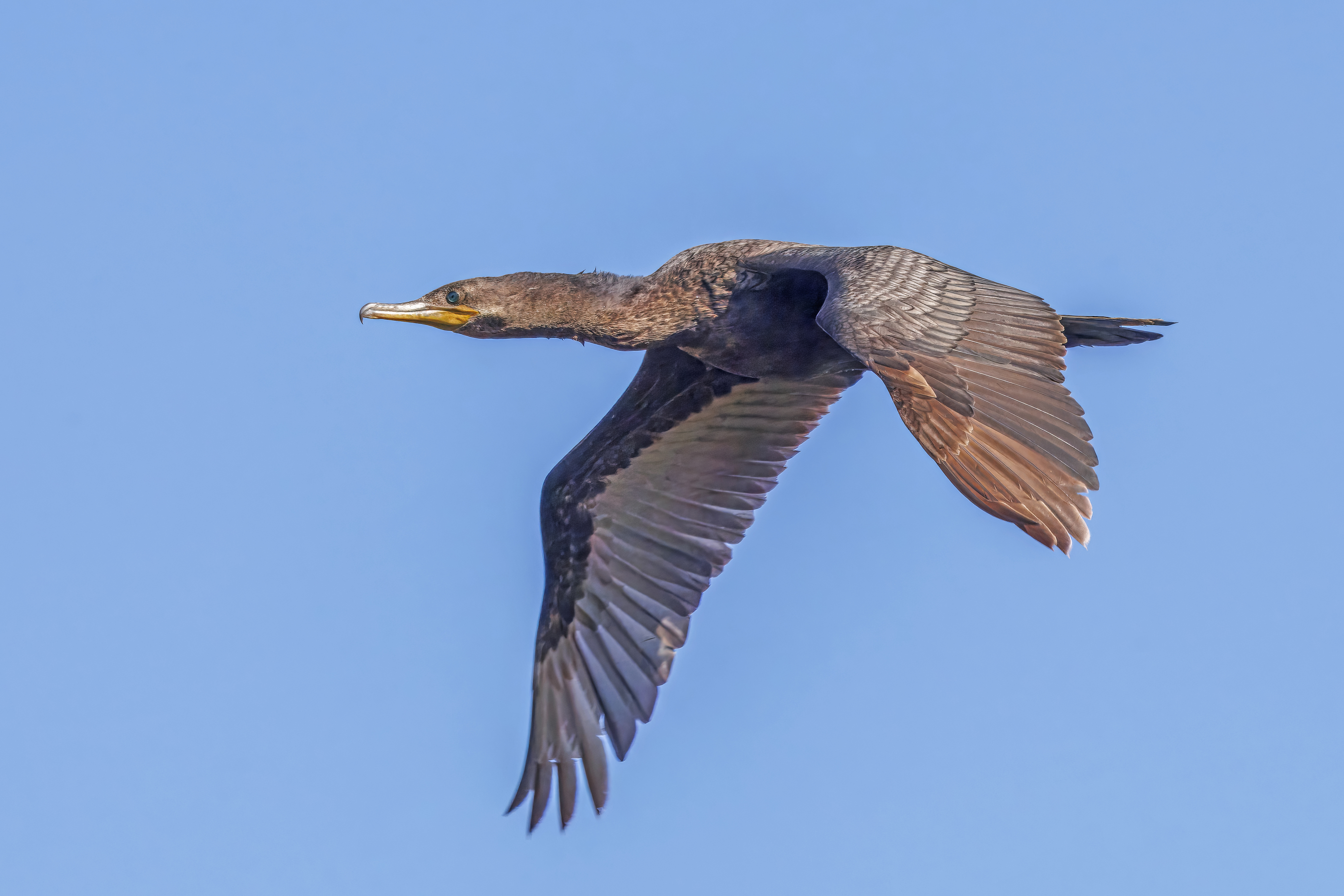
N. b brasilianum

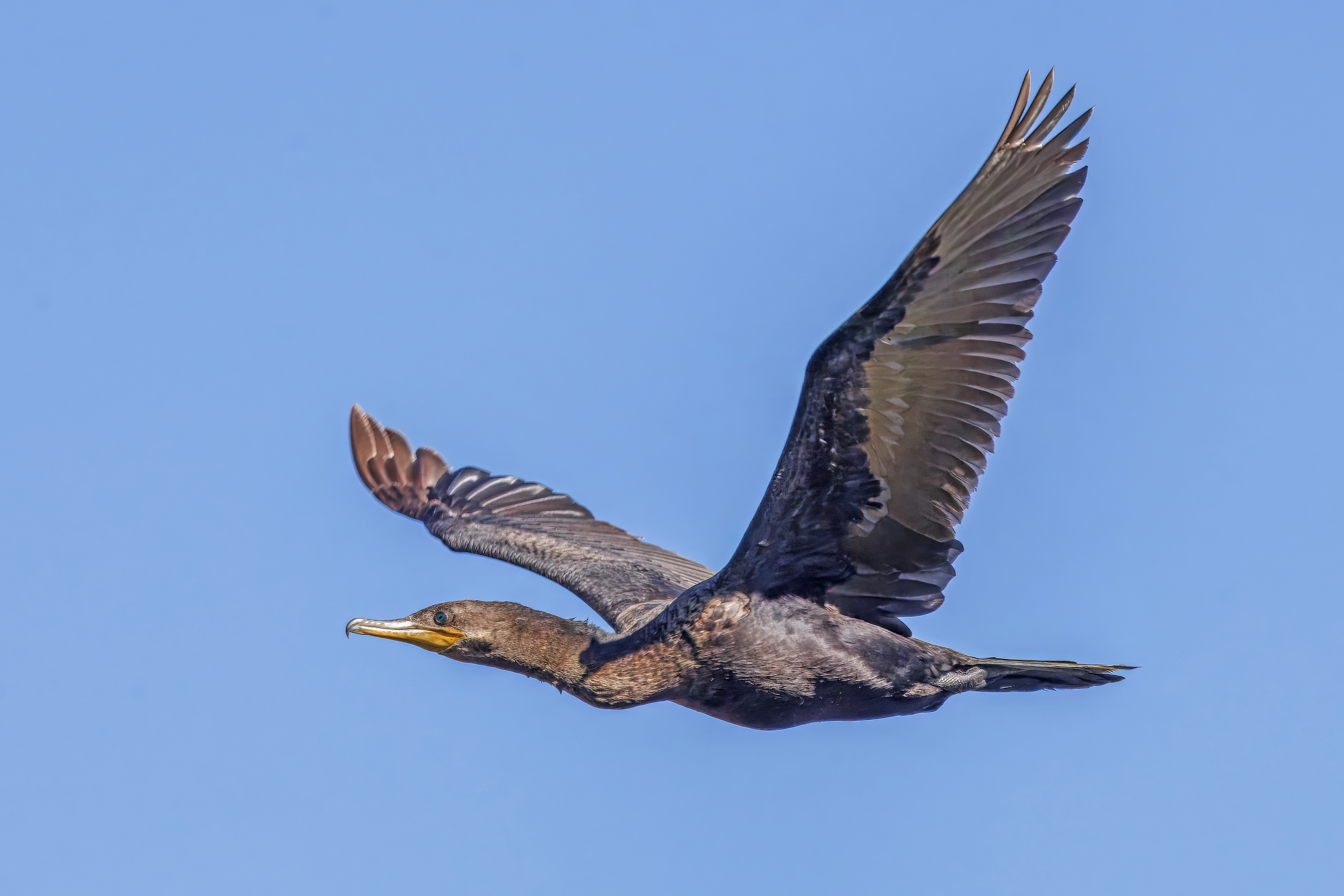
in Chile
