= MV American Cormorant =

Heavy-lift semi-submersible prepositioning ship

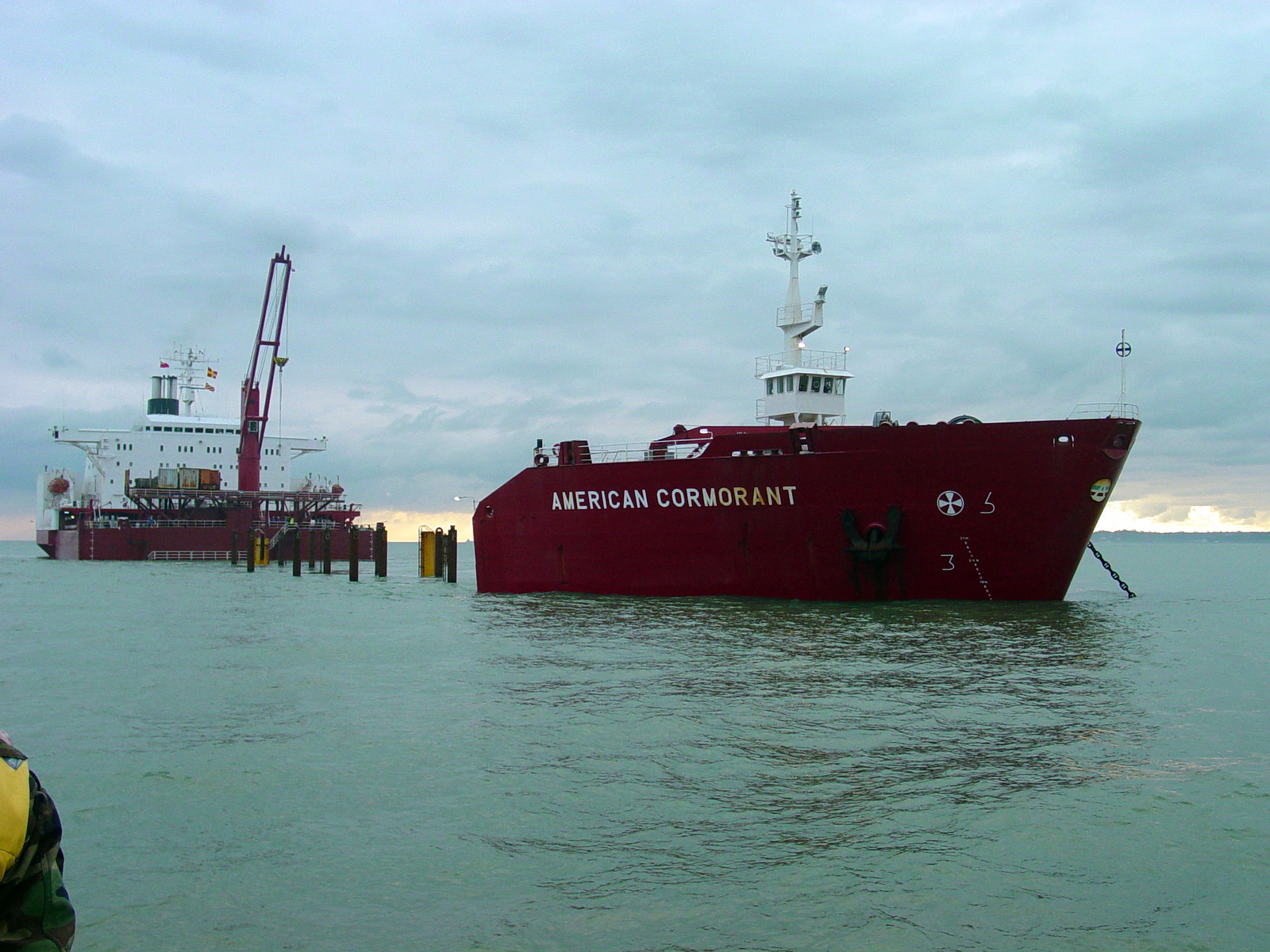
- MV American Cormorant

History

United States
- Name: American Cormorant
- Namesake: American Cormorant
- Owner: Odd Berg & Co. (1975–1982); Fearnley & Eger (1982–1985); Osprey Ship Management (1985–2005); Sam Woo Holdings Ltd. (2014-2010s)
- Builder: Eriksbergs Mekaniska Verkstad
- Yard number: 674
- Laid down: 1975
- Launched: 1975
- Completed: 1975
- Renamed: Kollbris (1975–1982); Ferncarrier (1982–1985); American Cormorant (1985–2005); Asian Atlas (2014–2010s)
- Identification: IMO number: 7388712; Callsign: V4YF2; Hull number: AK-2062
- Fate: Scrapped

General characteristics
- Type: Heavy-lift cargo ship
- Displacement: 17,942 metric tons (17,659 long tons), light; 70,692 metric tons (69,576 long tons), full
- Length: 738 ft (225 m)
- Beam: 175 ft 4 in (53.44 m)
- Draft: 34 ft 0 in (10.36 m)
- Propulsion: 1 × diesel engine; 1 × shaft
- Speed: 16 knots (30 km/h; 18 mph)
- Capacity: approx. 4,190 metric tons (4,120 long tons)
- Complement: 20 mariners

MV American Cormorant (AK-2062), was a heavy-lift cargo ship built in 1975, that took part in the Gulf War. The ship is named after a genus of cormorant comprising three species found in the Americas, hence the common name American cormorant.

== Construction and commissioning ==
The ship was built in 1975 by the Eriksbergs Mekaniska Verkstad, Gothenburg, Sweden. She was delivered to be used by Odd Berg & Co. as MV Kollbris in the same year until January 1982.

Kollbris was later sold to Fearnley & Eger and renamed to MV Ferncarrier from 1982 until 1985. During her time in Fearnley & Eger, she was converted from a tanker to a heavy-lift carrier.

In 1985, she was bought by Osprey Ship Management as MV American Cormorant and chartered by the Military Sealift Command (MSC) for the US Army. She was assigned to Marine Prepositioning Squadron 2 and was forward deployed at Diego Garcia. American Cormorant was underway in the Persian Gulf during Operation Desert Storm in 1991.

The contract with MSC was completed in 2002 and she would be returned to commercial service with Osprey until 2014. Sam Woo Holdings Ltd. bought and operated the ship as Asian Atlas. She would be scrapped later.
