= Trod Nossel Studios =

Recording studio in Connecticut

Coordinates: 41.449764°N 72.828997°W

Trod Nossel Studios, established in 1966 by Thomas “Doc” Cavalier, is a recording studio in Wallingford, Connecticut. It is one of the oldest operating large-format studios in the world. Trod Nossel is also one of the longest running recording studios in the US.

Originally an oral surgeon, Cavalier purchased microphone manufacturers Syncron Sound Studios in Wallingford, and turned it into Trod Nossel Recording Studios. He started off his career by managing acts such as The Shags and Bram Rigg Set. Since then Trod Nossel has worked with many artists, including Fleetwood Mac and R. Kelly, as well as placing songs for television.

Andrew Loog Oldham, manager and producer of the Rolling Stones was a close friend of Cavalier. He described “life on the Trod Nossel Studios lot” as “an American movie” in an interview on a Sirius Radio commentary (Chapter 6). The studio has received much press, in many news and magazine articles, including those in The New York Times, for its involvement in the industry. The Record Journal (a Connecticut paper) advocates, “In the ‘60s it was all about Trod Nossel.” Richard Hanley of Quinnipiac University said that Trod Nossel “was the key place for artists” and that Doc “embodied the spirit of the age.” Doc’s daughter, Darlene Cavalier, now runs the studio.

== Nominations ==
The studio has been nominated for several Grammy Awards for its work.

Year	Artist	Work	Nomination
1998	Pinetop Perkins	Born in the Delta	Best Traditional Blues Album
1999	Various artists	A Tribute To Howlin Wolf; Co-produced by Doc Cavalier	Best Traditional Blues Album
1999	Luther "Guitar Junior" Johnson and the Magic Rockers	Got To Find The Way	Best Traditional Blues Album
2011	R. Kelly	Untitled	Best Contemporary R&B Album
