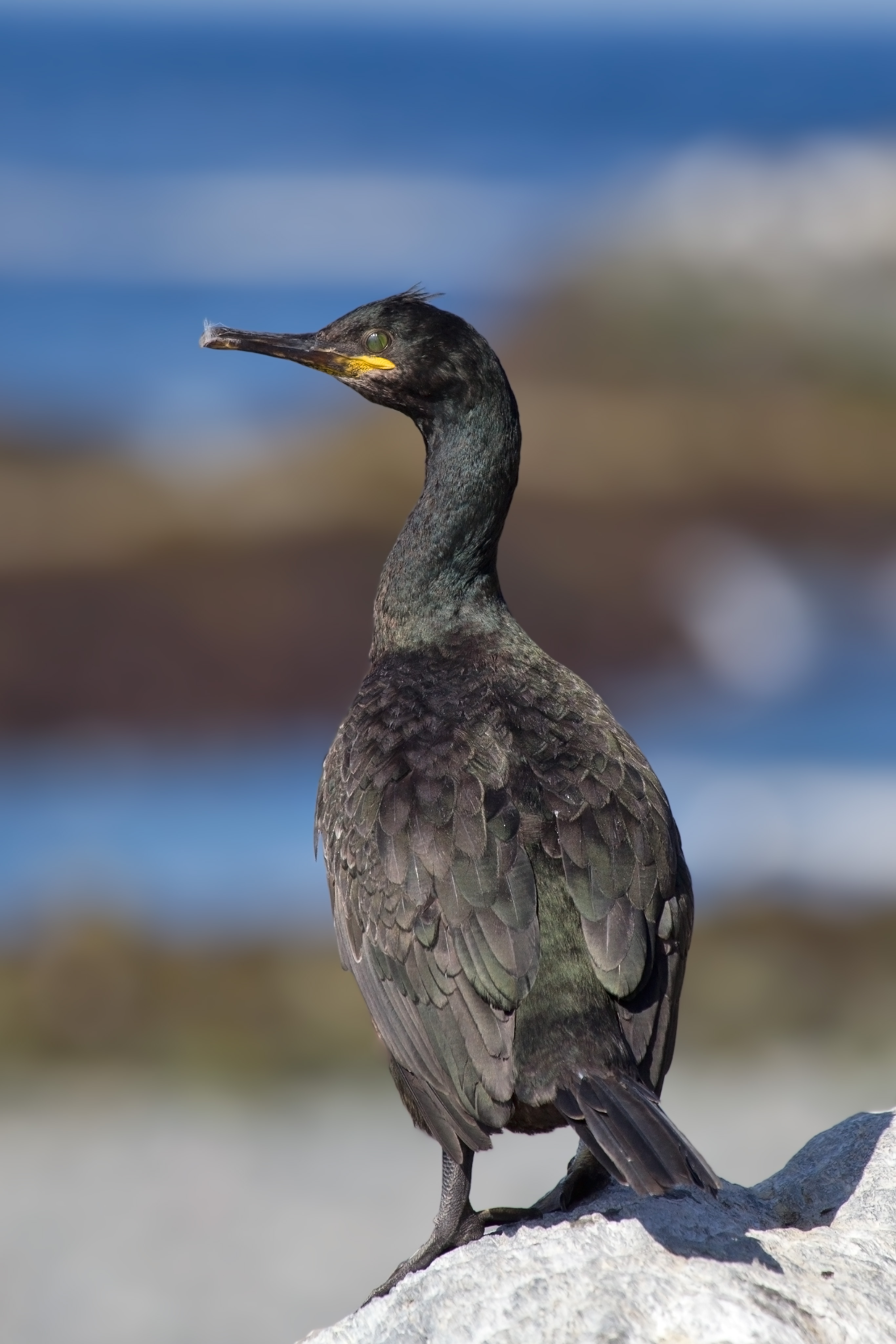
- European shag on a rock

Conservation status
- Least Concern (IUCN 3.1)

Scientific classification
- Kingdom: Animalia
- Phylum: Chordata
- Class: Aves
- Order: Suliformes
- Family: Phalacrocoracidae
- Genus: Gulosus; Montagu, 1813
- Species: G. aristotelis

Binomial name
- Gulosus aristotelis (Linnaeus, 1761)
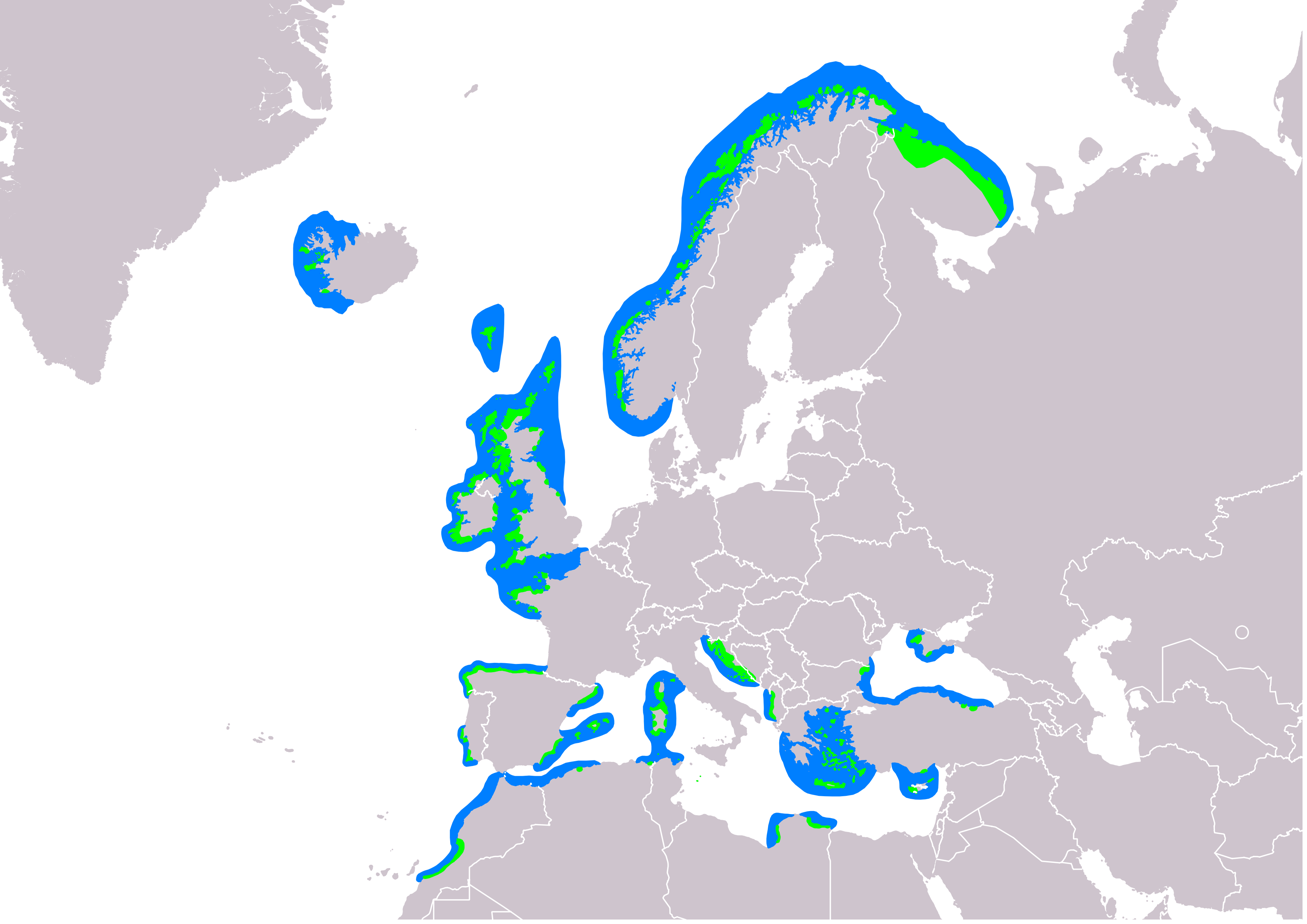
- Range of G. aristotelis Breeding Non-breeding

Synonyms
- Phalacrocorax aristotelis

= European shag =

Species of bird

The European shag or common shag (Gulosus aristotelis) is a species of cormorant. It is the only member of the monotypic genus Gulosus. It breeds around the rocky coasts of western and southern Europe, southwest Asia and north Africa, mainly wintering in its breeding range except for the northernmost birds. In Britain this seabird is usually referred to as simply the shag. The scientific genus name derives from the Latin for glutton. The species name aristotelis commemorates the Greek philosopher Aristotle.

== Taxonomy ==
The European shag was formerly classified within the genus Phalacrocorax, but a 2014 study found it to be significantly more diverged than the clade containing Phalacrocorax and Urile, but basal to the clade containing Nannopterum and Leucocarbo, and thus classified it in its own genus, Gulosus. The IOC followed this classification in 2021. Gulosus is thought to have split from the Nannopterum-Leucocarbo clade between 9.0–11.2 million years ago.

== Subspecies ==
There are three subspecies:

- G. a. aristotelis – (Linnaeus, 1761): nominate, found in northwestern Europe (Atlantic Ocean coasts)
- G. a. desmarestii – (Payraudeau, 1826): found in southern Europe, southwest Asia (Mediterranean and Black Sea coasts)
- G. a. riggenbachi – Hartert, 1923: found in northwest African coast

The subspecies differ slightly in bill size and the breast and leg colour of young birds. Recent evidence suggests that birds on the Atlantic coast of southwest Europe are distinct from all three, and may be an as-yet undescribed subspecies.

The name shag is also used in the Southern Hemisphere for several additional species of cormorants.

== Description ==
This is a medium-large black bird, 68 to 78 cm (27 to 31 in) long and with a 95-to-110-centimetre (37 to 43 in) wingspan. It has a longish tail and a yellow throat patch. Adults have a small crest in the breeding season. It is distinguished from the great cormorant by its smaller size, lighter build, thinner bill, and, in breeding adults, by the crest and metallic green-tinged sheen on the feathers. Among those differences are that a shag is smaller and has a lighter, narrower beak, and the juvenile shag has darker underparts. The European shag's tail has 12 feathers, as do the great cormorant's 14 feathers. The green sheen on the feathers results in the alternative name green cormorant sometimes being given to the European shag.

== Biology ==
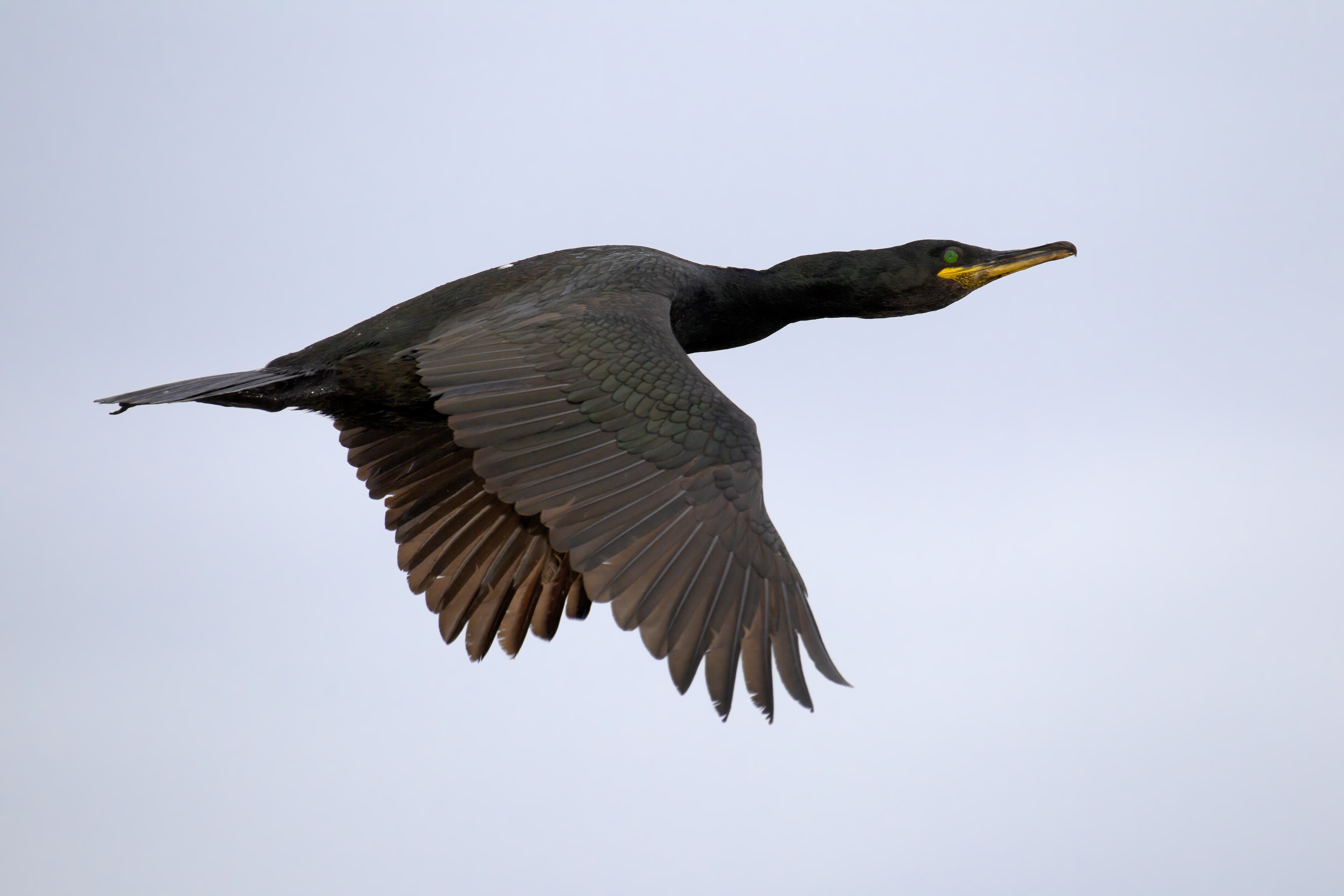
Shag in flight

It feeds in the sea, and, unlike the great cormorant, is rare inland. It will winter along any coast that is well-supplied with fish. The European shag is one of the deepest divers among the cormorant family. Using depth gauges, European shags recorded diving up to 61 m (200 ft) deep. European shags are preponderantly benthic zone feeders, i.e. they find their prey on the sea bottom. They will eat a wide range of fish but their commonest prey is the sand eel. Shags will travel many kilometres from their roosting sites in order to feed.

European Shag dives to 18 m. for hunting

In UK coastal waters, dive times are typically around 20 to 45 seconds, with a recovery time of around 15 seconds between dives. This is consistent with aerobic diving, i.e. the bird depends on the oxygen in its lungs and dissolved in its bloodstream during the dive. When they dive, they jump out of the water first to give extra impetus to the dive.

It breeds on coasts, nesting on rocky ledges or in crevices or small caves. The nests are untidy heaps of rotting seaweed or twigs cemented together by the bird's own guano. The nesting season is long, beginning in late February but some nests are not started until May or even later. Three eggs are laid. Their chicks hatch without down and so they rely totally on their parents for warmth, often for a period of two months before they can fly. Fledging may occur at any time from early June to late August, exceptionally to mid-October.

== Diet ==
The shag is a pursuit-diving seabird that feeds predominantly in benthic habitats. Due to the relative ease with which diet samples can be collected from this species (regurgitated food or pellets) and the perceived conflict between the Phalacrocoracidae and fisheries, shag diet competition has been the subject of substantial scientific interest. Evidence collected at one colony, the Isle of May, Scotland, between 1985 and 2014, suggests that shag chick diet composition in this population has diversified in response to ocean warming. Shags also feed on fewer sandeel on windy days, presumably due to the strong effect of wind on flight in this species. The year-round diet of full-grown shags at this colony has also changed over the past 3 decades, from sandeel specialists to an increasingly diverse prey base.

== Distribution ==
The European shag can be readily seen among the following locations during the breeding season, between late April and mid-July: Saltee Islands, Ireland; Farne Islands and Isles of Scilly, England; Isle of May, Deerness and Fowlsheugh, Scotland; Runde, Norway; Iceland; Denmark; Faroe Islands; Galicia, Northern Spain; Dalmatia and Istria, Croatia. In April 2017, eight new European shags were born in Monaco.

The British population was 18,000 pairs in 2015. A large colony of European shags is in the Cíes Islands, Spain, with 2,500 pairs.

== Gallery ==
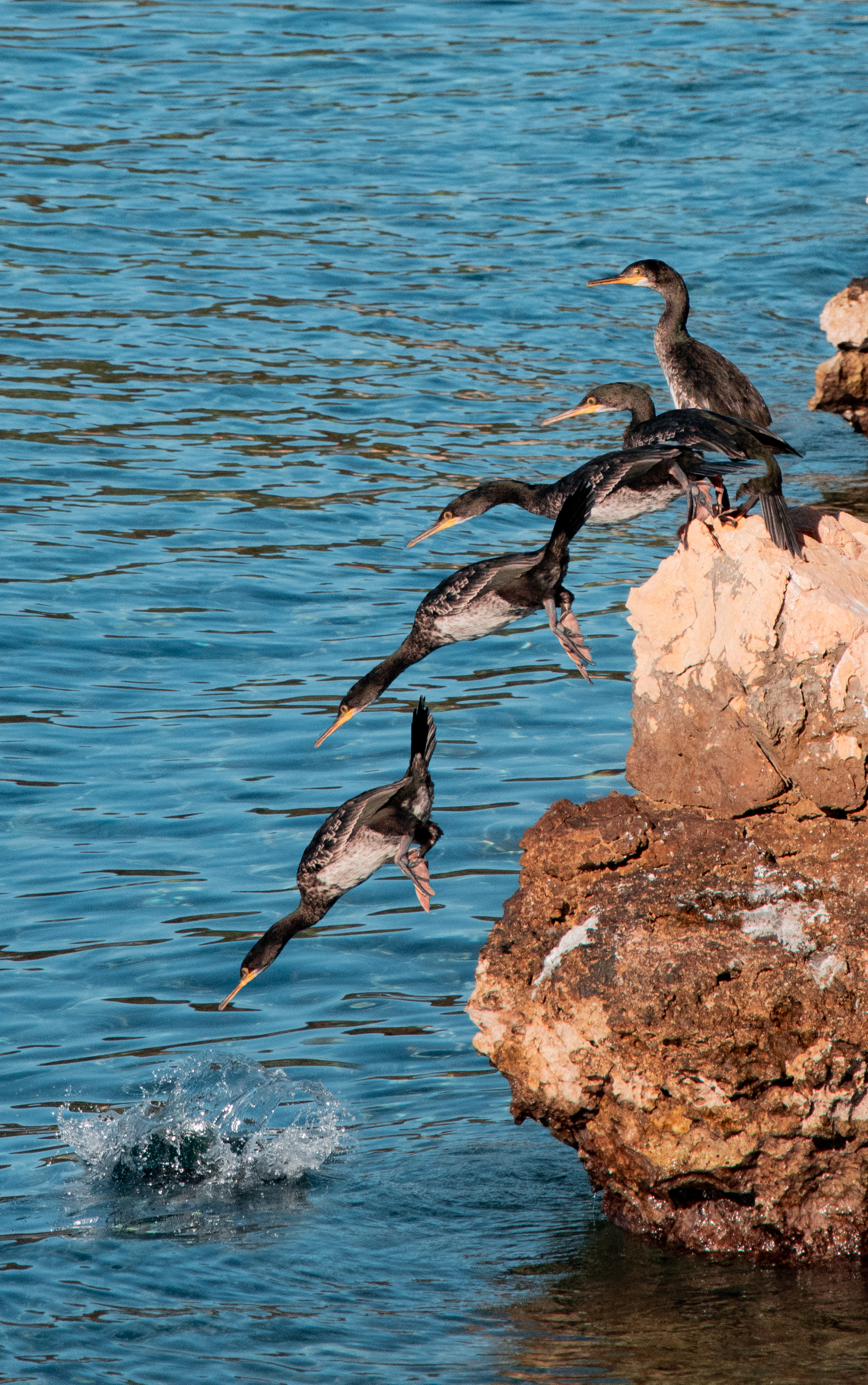
Composite image of the bird jumping into the sea in Malinska, Croatia

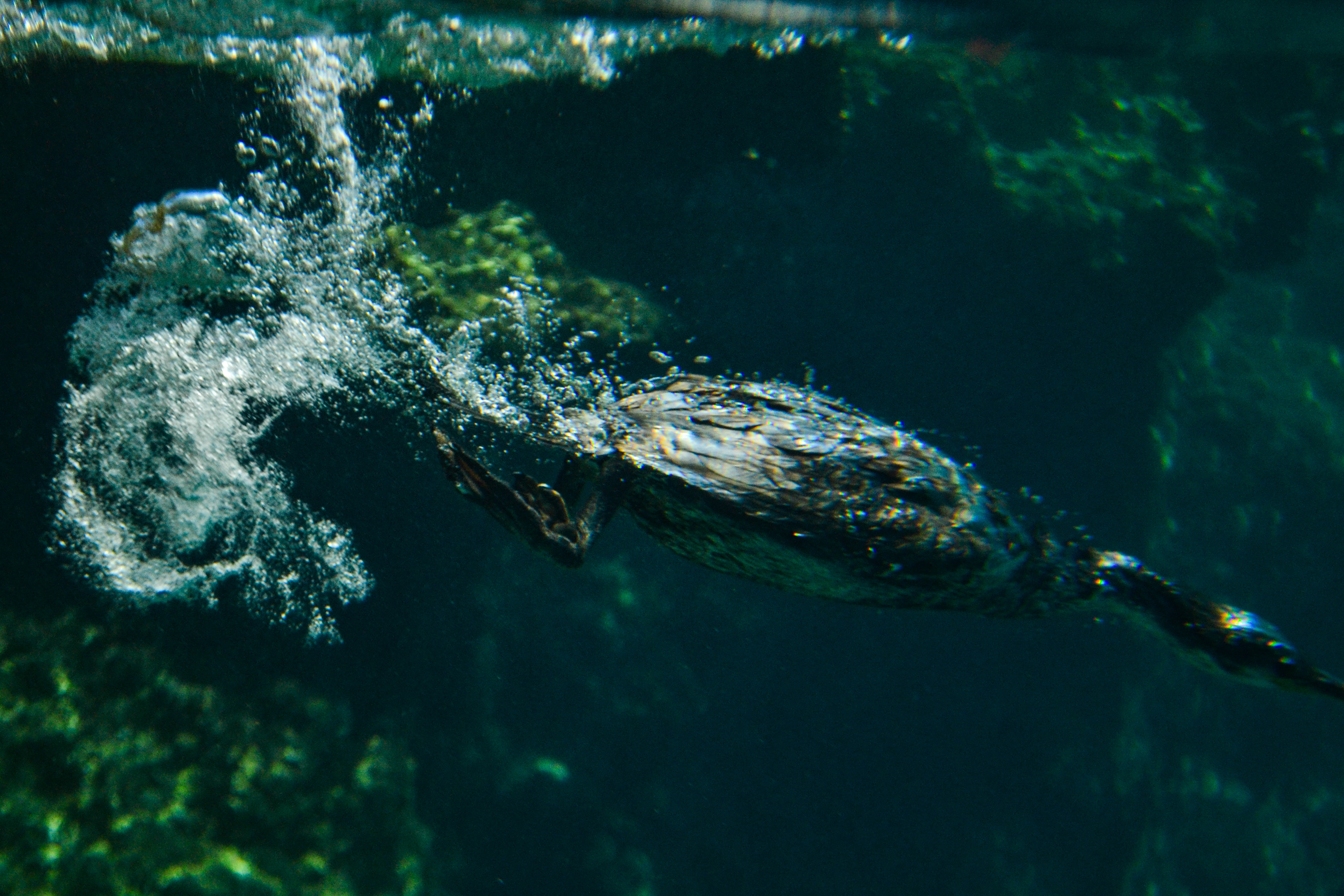
G. aristotelis diving

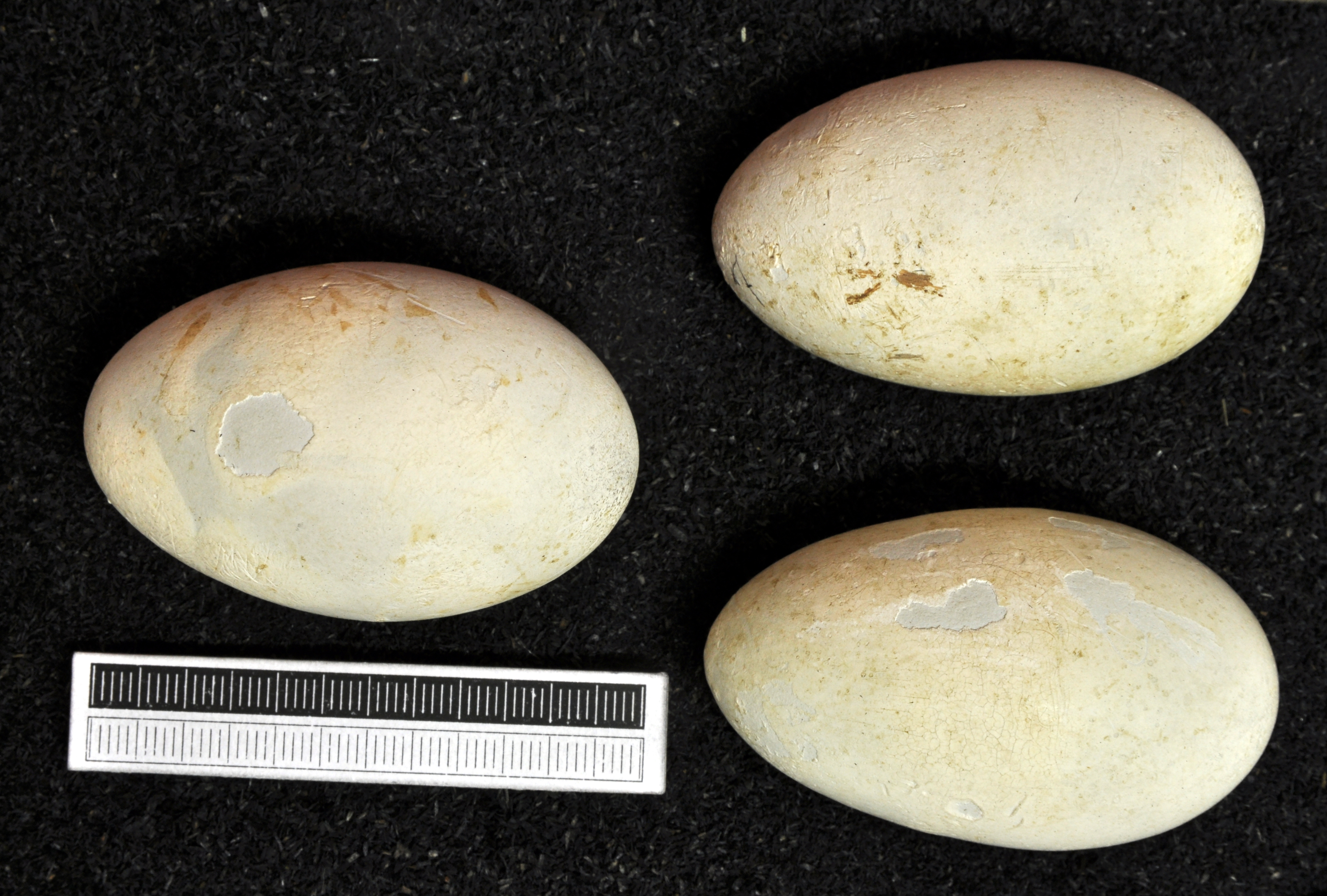
Eggs, Collection Museum Wiesbaden

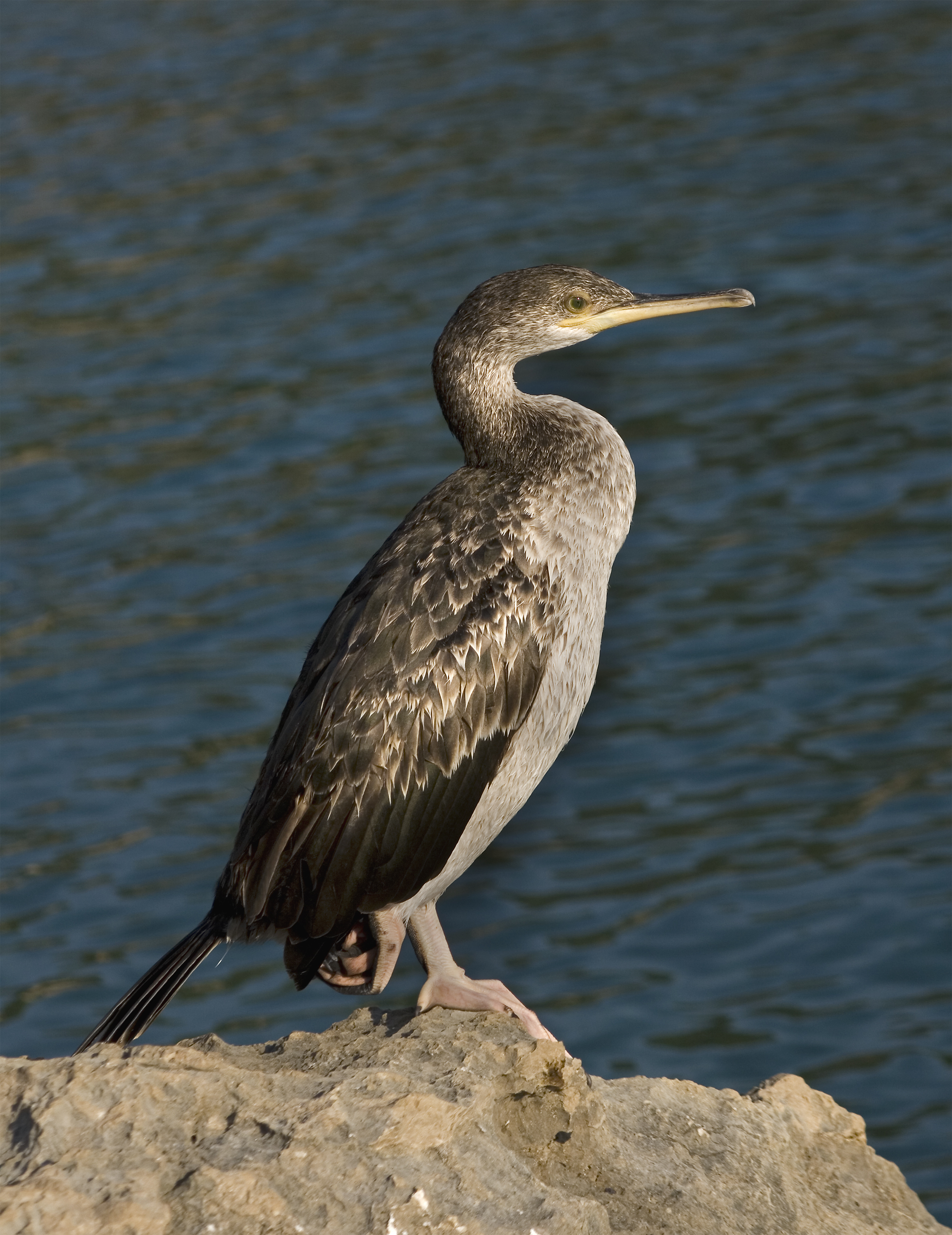
Young European shag in Croatia

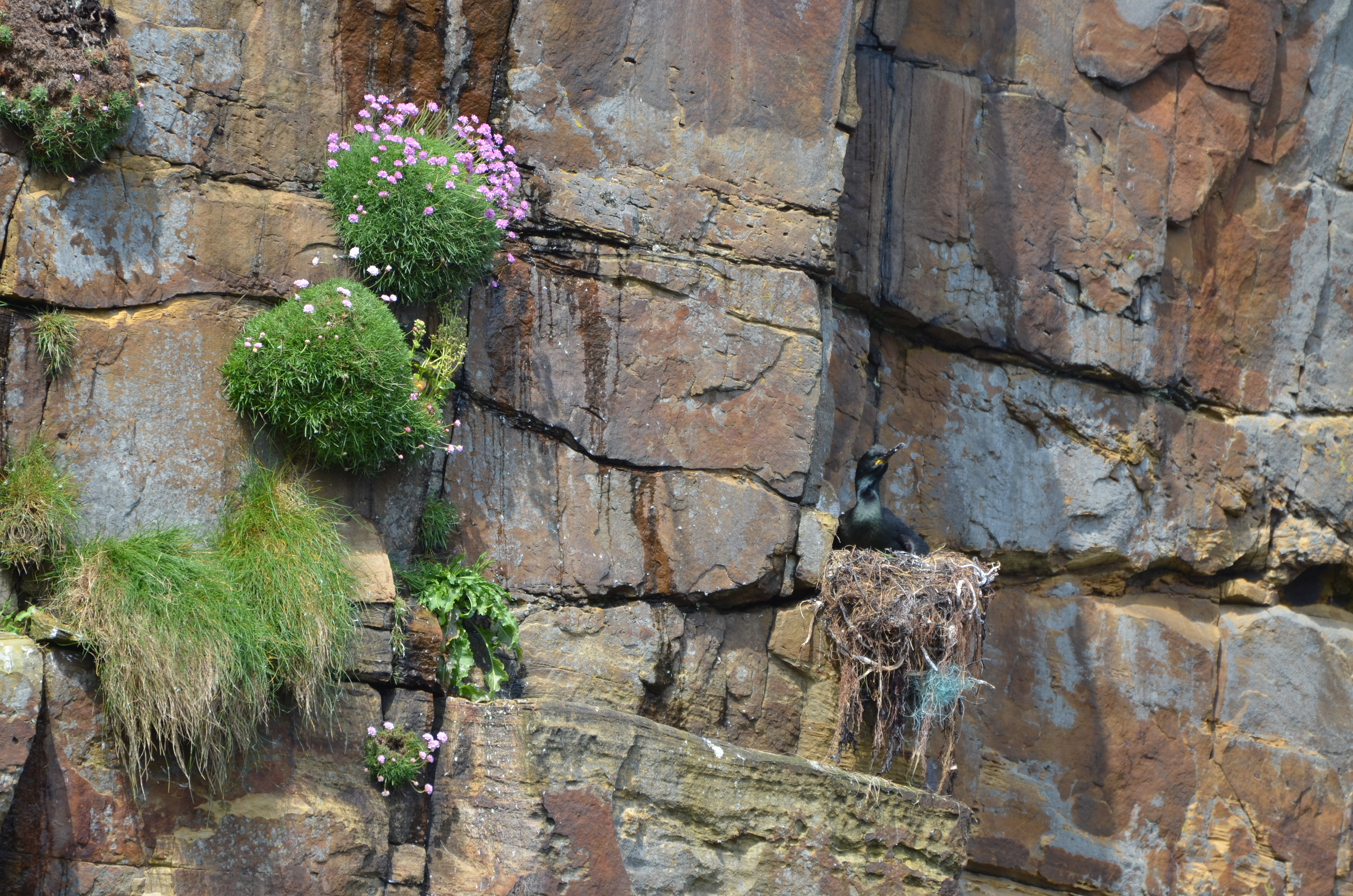
On the nest in Deerness, Orkney

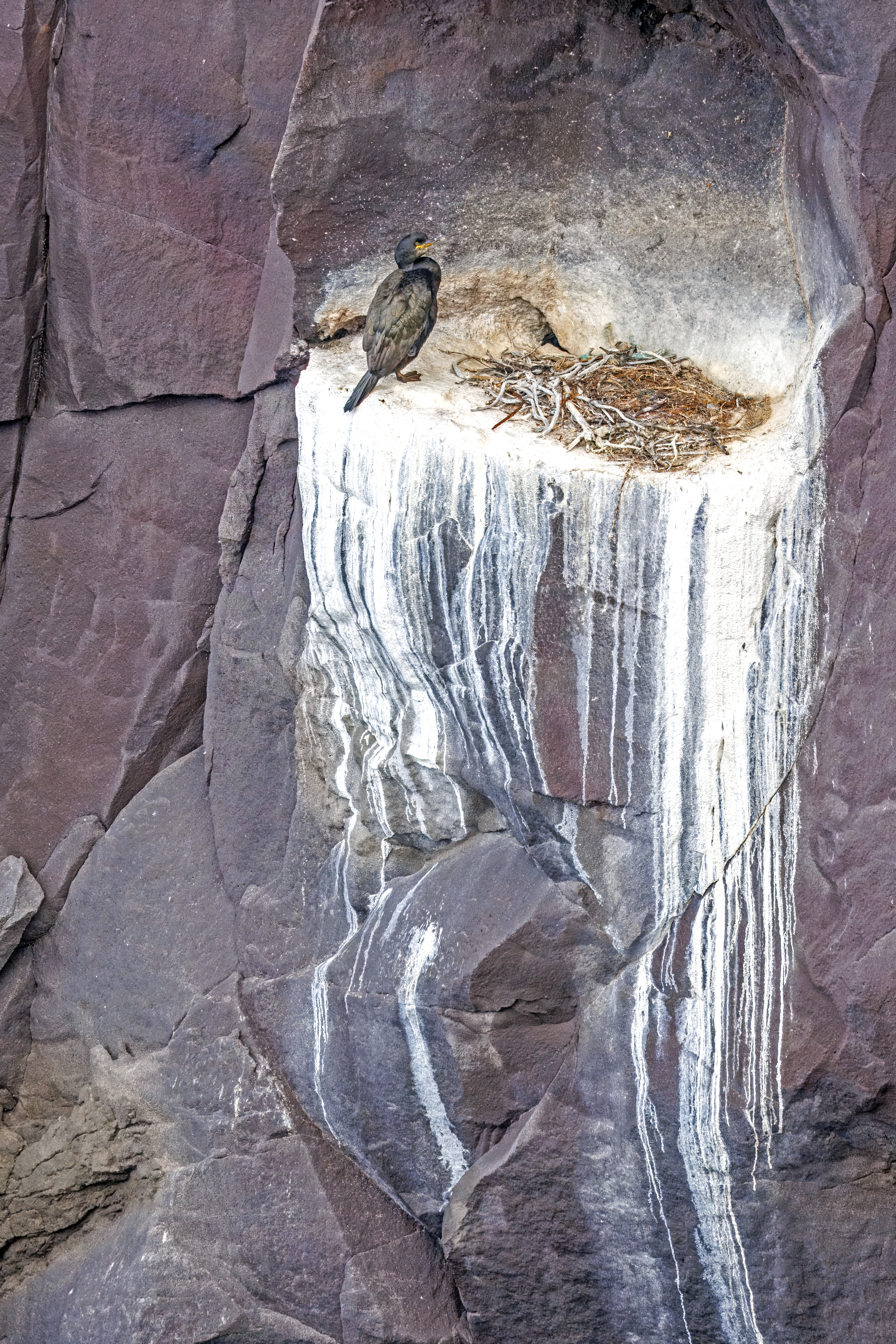
Nest in Iceland
