= Shaggy =

Shaggy may refer to:

== People ==
- Shaggy (musician) (born 1968), Jamaican American reggae rapper and singer
- Shaggy 2 Dope, half of the hip hop, horrorcore band Insane Clown Posse
- Shaggy Flores (born 1973), Nuyorican poet, writer and African diaspora scholar
- José Joaquín Martínez (born 1987), Mexican soccer player nicknamed "Shaggy" after Shaggy Rogers

== Other uses ==
- Shaggy (film), a 1948 American drama
- Shaggy Rogers, a fictional character in the Scooby-Doo series

== See also ==
- Shaggy dog story
- Shag (disambiguation)
