= Shag Rock =

Shag Rock may refer to the following places:

- Shag Rock (Antarctica)
- Shag Rock (California), United States
- Rapanui Rock, also called "Shag Rock", located in New Zealand
- Shag Rock (Houtman Abrolhos), Australia

== See also ==
- Shag Rock (band), Australian band formed in 2011
- Shag Rocks (disambiguation)
- Shag Reef, Tasmania, Australia
