= Shag Rock (Antarctica) =

Shag Rock (66°0′S 65°38′W) is a rock 0.1 miles (0.2 km) east of Cliff Island and 8 miles (13 km) west of Prospect Point, off the west coast of Graham Land. Charted and named by the British Graham Land Expedition (BGLE), 1934–37, under Rymill. It is one of many named rock formations of Graham Land.
