= Shag (name) =

Shag is both a given name and a surname. Notable people with the name include:

- Avraham-Haim Shag (1883–1958), Israeli politician
- Shag Thomas (1924–1982), American professional wrestler
