= The Shags (Connecticut band) =

American garage rock band

Background information
- Origin: West Haven, Connecticut, United States
- Genres: Garage rock; psychedelic
- Years active: 1963-1967
- Labels: Nutta, Sammy, Taurus, Laurie, Kayden
- Past members: Carl Augusto; Tom Violante; Billy Hall; Johnny Tangredi; John "Aaron" Perkins

The Shags were a garage rock band from West Haven, Connecticut, who were active in the mid-1960s, and recorded a number of songs, some at the Trod Nossel Studios. They were one of a number of bands at the time to use the moniker, "the Shags," but they were the best-known of these groups. Their work has been re-issued on various compilations, and they are known for the songs such as "Don't Press Your Luck" and "Breathe in My Ear." They re-united on several occasions in the 1980s and 1990s.

== History ==
=== Origins ===
The Shags were founded in West Haven, Connecticut in the summer of 1963 by schoolmates Tom Violante (stage name Tom Roberts) and Carl Augusto (stage name Carl Donnel). Like most members of their generation, the future members of the Shags had grown up listening to rock & roll. Augusto, had played lead guitar (and sometimes sang) and another future member of the Shags, Johnny Tangredi, played drums in a local, mostly instrumental surf rock band called the Deltons. But, sensing the rapidly approaching British Invasion, and now highly under its influence, Augusto and Violante wanted to form a new band that would reflect what they perceived to be the next big thing.

During the summer of 1963, Augusto and Violante started a new band, which consisted of Tom Violante on rhythm guitar and lead vocals, Carl Augusto on lead guitar, Rich Ventura on rhythm guitar and vocals, and Eddie Staffieri on drums. They would practice in Violante's family garage on Cynthia Drive in West Haven, later adding Bobby Giannotti on rhythm guitar and backing vocals. They eventually became known as the Hollywood Dropouts. Their lineup evolved with the departure of Ventura, Staffieri, and Giannotti. Mike Goodwin joined the band on bass and vocals and Jeff Cannata on drums (Cannata later went on to found Jasper Rath with Bobby Giannotti). However, Cannata soon departed and was replaced by Johnny Tangredi, who had played with the Deltons on drums. The band played occasional small venues.

=== Recording ===
In late 1964 the Hollywood Dropouts came to the attention of Sam Goldman, who had managed and produced the doo-wop stars, the Five Satins, in the late 1950s and would become the Shags' manager and producer. Around this time bassist Mike Goodwin left and was replaced by Billy Hall. The resulting lineup would be Tom Violante on rhythm guitar and lead vocals, Carl Augusto, on lead guitar and vocals, Billy Hall on bass and Johnny Tangredi on drums. The band also brought in John "Aaron" Perkins on vocals, but he only sang in live performances, not when the group was recording.

Goldman insisted that they switch to a shorter name, which would be easier to fit onto a record label. Goldman suggested the name "the Creeps," but Augusto and Violante objected, so, at the suggestion of Deltons' organ player Andy Smith, they eventually settled on the name, the Shags. The name was based on the longer "shaggy" hairstyles that the Beatles had popularized, which many American groups such as the Shags were attempting to adopt. Such longer hairstyles styles were controversial and could put one wearing one in danger. According to Augusto, "Sometimes you really had to watch it...More than once I had to run like mad from guys that wanted, literally, to knock my head off because of the hair on top of it." Though there were a handful of other bands of the mid-1960s to use the moniker, "the Shags" or something similar, they were the best known of the groups using the name and would later, upon their reunion in 1995, acquire a registered trademark ensuring exclusive use of the name.

In 1965 the band recorded their first single, "Wait and See" b/w "It Hurts Me Bad" at A-1 Sound Studios on 56th street (formerly the home of the Atlantic Records studio) in New York City, which was released on Nutta Records. They also recorded the song "'Cause of You" at that session. Violante sang the lead vocal on "Wait and See" and "'Cause of You", and Augusto took lead vocals on "It Hurts Me Bad", with the others supplying the harmonies. According to Augusto: "We didn't have a lot of studio time, so there were usually a lot of mistakes...we tended to be pretty conservative in the studio so we could get things right, but a lot of the live excitement was lost in the process." Robert Irwin, an old friend, also accompanied the band, having sung with Augusto and Violante at their first rehearsal. On the way to the studio the band was confronted by a group of local hoodlums, who convinced the band to let them take part in the recording sessions. according to Augusto:

I don't know how this happened exactly...but we had some real tough guys from the neighborhood come with us. I would call them 'wise guys,' but that has too much of a mafia connotation. They were from Grand Avenue – the Italian section of town. I mean, these guys were considered 'hoods,' and we were a little nervous. They managed to convince us to let them get involved in the recording. A guy named Whitey – I think his name was – did a tambourine in the background, and he wasn't that good. But we were afraid to say anything to him!

"Wait and See" went to #5 on the local charts and stayed there for three weeks. At this time the Shags were growing in popularity, playing venues such as adult and teen nightclubs, colleges, outdoor concerts, and block parties. They followed up with another single, "By My Side" b/w "'Cause of You", released on Sammy records, however it did not fare as well on the local charts. After the disappointment of "By My Side," Sam Goldman and the group parted ways.

=== Management by "Doc" Cavalier ===
"We were popular, sort of like the state's homegrown Beatles. If people knew where we were rehearsing, every kid on the block and for miles around would be snooping in the windows."

— Tom Violate reflecting on the Shags popularity in New England during the 1960s

It was at this time that a dentist, Thomas "Doc" Cavalier, who was a friend of drummer Johnny Tangredi, had decided to become involved in the music business and would eventually buy Synchron Sound Studios in Wallingford, Connecticut, changing its name to Trod Nossel Studios. Cavalier became their manager and set up the band with a recording contract with his label, Taurus Records, in autumn 1965. The Shags would be the first act that Cavalier would produce and manage. He also managed and recorded the Bram Rigg Set, as well as a host of other bands from the New Haven area.

The Shags' next single "Don't Press Your Luck" b/w "Hey Little Girl", recorded at Trod Nossel and released in May 1966 on Taurus Records, became a double-sided hit in a wide region, with both sides receiving ample airplay, particularly "Don't Press Your Luck", which was the Shags' definitive breakout hit, making the band a New England phenomenon. Now that they were one of the most popular bands in their region, they were able to open for top-name acts such as the Byrds, Paul Revere and the Raiders, Chad and Jeremy, the Young Rascals, B. B. King, Peter and Gordon, the Beau Brummels, the Lovin' Spoonful, Simon & Garfunkel, the Righteous Brothers, and the Coasters. In June 1965, the band appeared at a show sponsored by Danny Thomas to raise funds to build a hospital held at Yale's Woolsey Hall which featured Lesley Gore, Chubby Checker, and other local groups. The Shags, who received third billing, were greeted with a mob of screaming girls, not unlike "Beatlemania". According to Augusto, "I mean, we had the hit record...and Checker and Gore were has-beens!"

For the band's next single, they cut a version of the Beatles' "I Call Your Name" b/w "Hide Away" at Trod Nossel, which was released on Laurie Records. In 1966 the Shags, along with the Bram Rig Set, appeared in lip-synched featurettes for the pilot episode of a new local TV show, The Show With A Very Long Title, which was never aired. In 1967 the band released the single "Tell Me" b/w "As Long as I Have You" on the Philadelphia-based label Kayden, a subsidiary of Cameo Records. The band subsequently released "Breathe in my Ear" b/w "Easy Street" on Laurie, and it reached 101 in the national charts. However, it was banned in some markets, such as certain fundamentalist areas in the South, out of concerns about its suggestive lyrics, which prevented it from achieving a higher position. However, by 1967 the band had difficulty finding a steady bass player. Due to disagreements between band members, as well as changes in tastes in popular music, the band decided to break up.).

=== Later developments ===
Augusto and Violante continued to work together in different capacities, joining with former members of the Bram Rig set and other musicians to form Pulse, a heavy rock combo, whose sound reflected the dark and tumultuous mood of 1968. According to Augusto:

1968 was one of the most tumultuous years in American history...It started with the Tet Offensive in Vietnam where Americans got slapped into reality; Lyndon Johnson decided not to run; Martin Luther King and [Robert] Kennedy were assassinated; race riots occurred in major cities in the summer; and then there was the violence at the Chicago Democratic Convention. That was a very, very, very scary year, and, you know, some of us were wondering – is this country really gonna make it?

Under Violante and Tangredi's leadership, the Shags reformed in the 1980s and re-united on several occasions in the 1990s. Tommy Violante has worked with the regional VNA office in Connecticut and continues to be active musically, having fronted the Key West Trio, a Jimmy Buffett and Beach Boys-influenced band that also does '50's and '60's covers. The Shags' work has been represented on compilations such as Sundazed Music' Don't Press Your Luck! The In Sounds of 60s Connecticut.

== Membership ==
- Carl (Augusto) Donnell (lead guitar, vocals)
- Tom (Violante) Roberts (rhythm guitar, vocals)
- Billy Hall (bass)
- Lance (Biesele) Gardner (bass)
- Johnny (Tangredi) Stanton (drums).
- John "Aaron" Perkins (vocals, live only)
- Myron Frame (vocals and percussion)

== Discography ==
- "Wait and See" b/w "It Hurts Me Bad" (Nutta 101, rel. 1965)
- "By My Side" b/w "Cause of You" (Sammy 102, rel. 1965)
- "Don't Press Your Luck" b/w "Hey Little Girl" (Taurus 1881, rel. 1966)
- "I Call Your Name" b/w "Hide Away" (Laurie 3353, rel. 1966)
- "Tell Me" b/w "As Long as I Have You" (Kayden 407, rel. 1967)
- "Breathe in My Ear" b/w "Easy Street" (Kayden 408, re. 1967)
