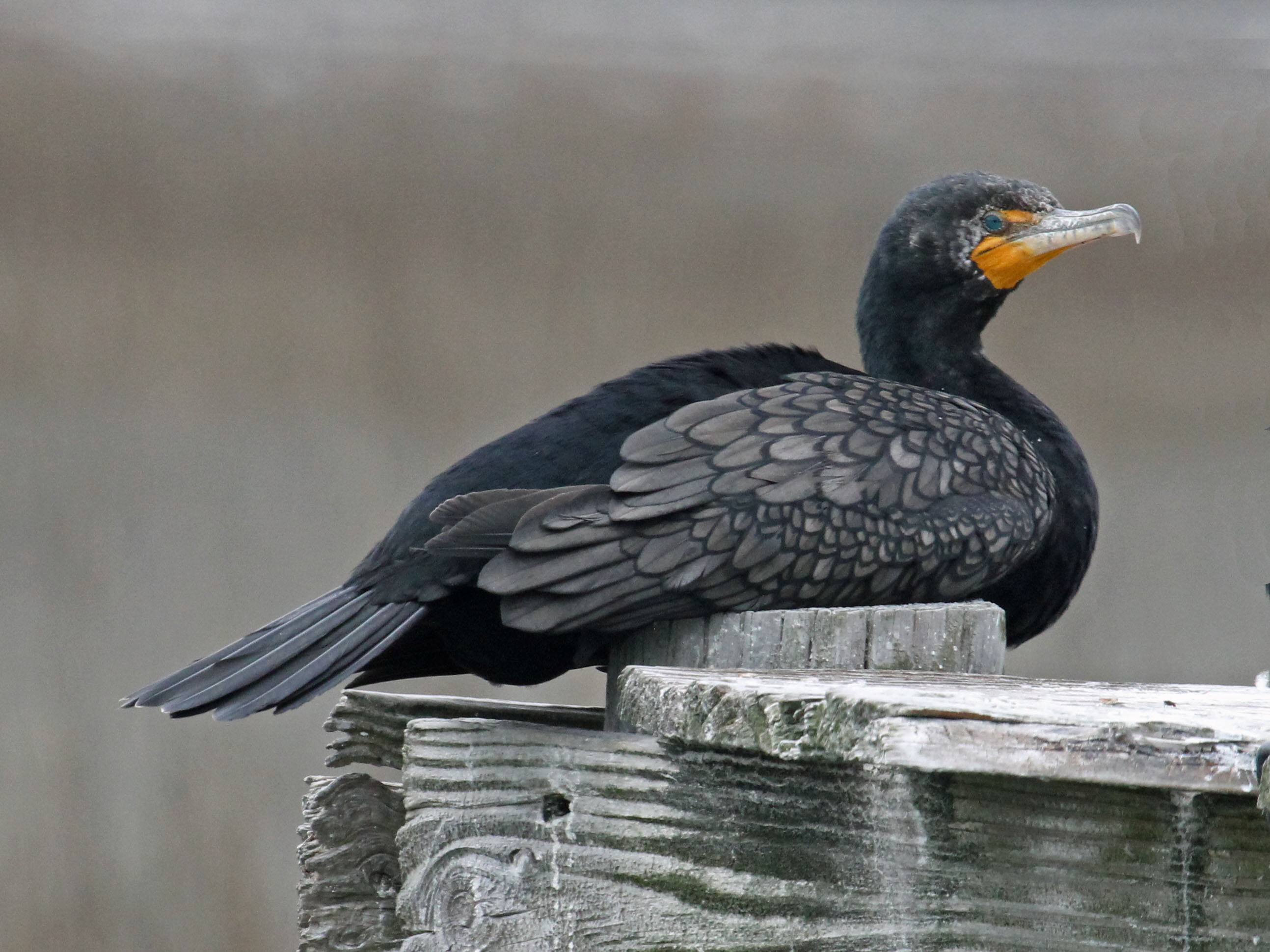
- Double-crested cormorant (N. auritum)

Scientific classification
- Kingdom: Animalia
- Phylum: Chordata
- Class: Aves
- Order: Suliformes
- Family: Phalacrocoracidae
- Genus: Nannopterum; Sharpe, 1899

Type species
- Phalacrocorax harrisi Rothschild, 1898

Species
- N. harrisi N. brasilianum N. auritum

Synonyms
- Dilophalieus Coues, 1903 Viguacarbo Coues, 1903

= Nannopterum =

American cormorants

Genus of birds

Nannopterum is a genus of cormorant comprising three species. They are found throughout the Americas, hence the common name American cormorants.

These species were formerly classified in the genus Phalacrocorax. A molecular phylogenetic study of the cormorants published in 2014 found that these three species formed a clade that was sister to the genus Leucocarbo. To create monophyletic genera, the three species were moved the resurrected genus Nannopterum that had been introduced in 1899 by English ornithologist Richard Bowdler Sharpe to accommodate the flightless cormorant. The genus Nannopterum is thought to have split from Leucocarbo between 6.7 - 8.0 million years ago.

The genus name Nannopterum combines the Ancient Greek nannos meaning "dwarf" with pteron meaning "wing". This name was coined for the flightless cormorant, which does indeed have small wings. Genetic studies have found that the neotropic and double-crested cormorants form a clade with the flightless cormorant, and they are thus placed together in the genus Nannopterum despite both species having normal-sized wings and full flight capabilities.

== List of species ==
Genus Nannopterum – Rothschild, 1898 – three species
| Common name | Scientific name and subspecies | Range | Size and ecology | IUCN status and estimated population |
|---|---|---|---|---|
| Flightless cormorant | Nannopterum harrisi (Rothschild, 1898) | Fernandina and Isabela Islands in the Galápagos Islands, Ecuador | Size: Habitat: Diet: | VU |
| Neotropic cormorant | Nannopterum brasilianum (Gmelin, 1789) Two subspecies: N. b. mexicanum (Brandt, JF, 1837); N. b. brasilianum (Gmelin, JF, 1789) | Resident from Tierra Del Fuego north to all of South America, Central America, and Mexico to the Gulf Coast of Texas, along with the southern tip of Baja California, Cuba, and Great Inagua island. Breeding range extends north to most of east-central Texas and central Arizona & New Mexico. Nonbreeding range extends to most of Bahamas. | Size: Habitat: Diet: | LC |
| Double-crested cormorant | Nannopterum auritum (Lesson, 1831) Five subspecies: N. a. albociliatum (Ridgway 1884); N. a. auritum (Lesson, 1831); N. a. cincinnatum (Brandt 1837); N. a. floridanum (Audubon 1835); N. a. heuretum | Throughout North America, from Alaska to all of Canada and the United States, south to the Yucatán Peninsula, the Bahamas, Cuba and Hispaniola | Size: Habitat: Diet: | LC |
