= Shag Rocks =

Shag Rocks may refer to:

- Shag Rocks (Massachusetts)
- Shag Rocks, South Georgia
- Shag Rocks (Western Australia), rocks in Western Australia

== See also ==
- Shag Reef
- Shag Rock (disambiguation)
