= Gordon Walker (professor) =

Gordon Peter Walker is emeritus professor in the Lancaster Environment Centre at Lancaster University, UK, retiring in 2023. He is British, and also taught at an earlier incarnation of Staffordshire University. He studied geography at the University of Cambridge and University of Leeds (PhD in Geography, 1986, Planning control of hazardous installations and development in their vicinity).

== Scholarship ==
Walker has contributed to scholarship on the social, spatial, temporal and normative dimensions of environment, sustainability, climate and risk issues (particularly flooding). He is the author of many publications on environmental justice and inequality, and community energy initiatives which involve embedding renewable energy at the local level.

He is best known for elaborating how environmental justice can be conceptualised and put into practice, and for a major project and several publications on energy demand in the UK with Elizabeth Shove and others.

In 2021, he published a major work on Rhythmanalysis, a term coined by Henri Lefebvre and Lúcio Alberto Pinheiro dos Santos.

.

== Major works ==
- Walker, G.P. 2021. Energy and Rhythm: Rhythmanalysis for a Low Carbon Future. Rowman & Littlefield. ISBN 9781786613356.
- Bridge, G., Barr, S., Bouzarovski, S., Bradshaw, M., Brown, E., Bulkeley, H., Walker, G.P. 2018. Energy and Society: a critical perspective. Routledge. ISBN 9780415740739, 9780415740746.
- Hui, A., Day, R., Walker, G.P. (eds.). 2017. Demanding energy: space, time and change. Palgrave Macmillan. ISBN 9783319619903.
- Walker, G.P. 2012. Environmental Justice: Concepts, Evidence and Politics. Routledge. ISBN 9780415589734.
- Holifield, R., Chakraborty, J., Walker, G.P. (eds.). 2017. Routledge Handbook of Environmental Justice. Routledge. ISBN 9780367581121, 9781138932821.
- Holifield, R., Porter, M., Walker, G.P. (eds.). 2010. Spaces of Environmental Justice. Wiley Blackwell. ISBN 9781444332452.
- Kivell, P., Roberts, P., Walker, G.P. (eds.). 2008. Environment, planning and land use. Routledge. ISBN 9781138313088.

== See also ==
- David Elliott (professor)
- Andy Stirling
- Stephen Thomas (economist)
