= Social production of space =

Sociological theory

The social production of space is a concept in the sociology of space which contends that space is neither a thing nor a container, but a product and means of production. Thus, space is produced and constructed socially and through a set of human relations. It was pioneered by philosopher Henri Lefebvre in his 1974 book La Production de l'espace. This book was translated into English by Donald Nicholson-Smith in the year 1991.

== Trichotomy ==
According to Lefebvre, there are different modes of production of space: natural and social space. Lefebvre developed a conceptual triad of space:

1. Spatial practice (perceived space): The physical organization of space, such as daily routines and activities;
2. Representations of space (conceived space): The space created and imagined by urban planners, architects, and other professionals;
3. Representational space (lived space): The individual, subjective experience of space, shaped by symbols, images, and personal emotions.

Physical space is constructed by various actors, e.g. the state, landowners and architects. Discursive space is mentally constructed by the way the space is discussed and represented. This is separate from physical space as spaces can have discursive representations without physically existing. Representational space is socially constructed by the lived experience of the people who interact with it.

== Lefebvre's writings ==
Henri Lefebvre dedicated a great deal of his philosophical writings to understanding the importance of (the production of) space in what he called the reproduction of social relations of production. This idea is the central argument in the book The Survival of Capitalism, written as a sort of prelude to La Production de l'espace (1974) (The Production of Space). These works have deeply influenced current urban theory, mainly within human geography, as seen in the current work of authors such as David Harvey, Dolores Hayden, and Edward Soja, and in the contemporary discussions around the notion of spatial justice. Lefebvre is widely recognized as a Marxist thinker who was responsible for widening considerably the scope of Marxist theory, embracing everyday life and the contemporary meanings and implications of the ever-expanding reach of the urban in the western world throughout the 20th century. The generalization of industry, and its relation to cities (which is treated in La Pensée marxiste et la ville), The Right to the City and The Urban Revolution were all themes of Lefebvre's writings in the late 1960s, which was concerned, among other aspects, with the deep transformation of "the city" into "the urban" which culminated in its omnipresence (the "complete urbanization of society").

Lefebvre contends that there are different modes of production of space (i.e. spatialization) from natural space ('absolute space') to more complex spaces and flows whose meaning is produced in a social way (i.e. social space). Lefebvre analyzes each historical mode as a three-part dialectic between everyday practices and perceptions (le perçu), representations or theories of space (le conçu) and the spatial imaginary of the time (le vécu).

Lefebvre's argument in The Production of Space is that space is a social product, or a complex social construction (based on values, and the social production of meanings) which affects spatial practices and perceptions. This argument implies the shift of the research perspective from space to processes of its production; the embrace of the multiplicity of spaces that are socially produced and made productive in social practices; and the focus on the contradictory, conflictual, and, ultimately, political character of the processes of production of space. As a Marxist theorist (but highly critical of the economic structuralism that dominated the academic discourse in his period), Lefebvre argues that this social production of urban space is fundamental to the reproduction of society, hence of capitalism itself. The social production of space is commanded by a hegemonic class as a tool to reproduce its dominance (see Antonio Gramsci).

(Social) space is a (social) product ... the space thus produced also serves as a tool of thought and of action ... in addition to being a means of production it is also a means of control, and hence of domination, of power.

Lefebvre argued that every society—and, therefore, every mode of production—produces a certain space, its own space. The city of the ancient world cannot be understood as a simple agglomeration of people and things in space—it had its own spatial practice, making its own space (which was suitable for itself—Lefebvre argues that the intellectual climate of the city in the ancient world was very much related to the social production of its spatiality). Then if every society produces its own space, any "social existence" aspiring to be or declaring itself to be real, but not producing its own space, would be a strange entity, a very peculiar abstraction incapable of escaping the ideological or even cultural spheres. Based on this argument, Lefebvre criticized Soviet urban planners on the basis that they failed to produce a socialist space, having just reproduced the modernist model of urban design (interventions on physical space, which were insufficient to grasp social space) and applied it onto that context:

Change life! Change Society! These ideas lose completely their meaning without producing an appropriate space. A lesson to be learned from soviet constructivists from the 1920s and 30s, and of their failure, is that new social relations demand a new space, and vice-versa.

== Criticism and response ==
In his book The Urban Question, Manuel Castells criticizes Lefebvre's Marxist humanism and approach to the city influenced by Hegel and Nietzsche. Castells' political criticisms of Lefebvre's approach to Marxism echoed the structuralist Scientific Marxism school of Louis Althusser of which Lefebvre was an immediate critic. Many responses to Castells are provided in The Survival of Capitalism, and some such as Andy Merrifield argue that the acceptance of those critiques in the academic world would be a motive for Lefebvre's effort in writing the long and theoretically dense The Production of Space.

In "Actually-Existing Success: Economics, Aesthetics, and the Specificity of (Still-)Socialist Urbanism," Michal Murawski critiques Lefebvre's dismissal of actually existing socialism by showing how socialist states produced differential space.

== See also ==
- Social space – Place where people gather and interact
- Sociology of space – Sub-discipline of sociology
- Space of flows
- Time–space compression – Idea in space–time
