= Diana Morant =

Spanish politician (born 1980)

The Most Excellent Diana Morant
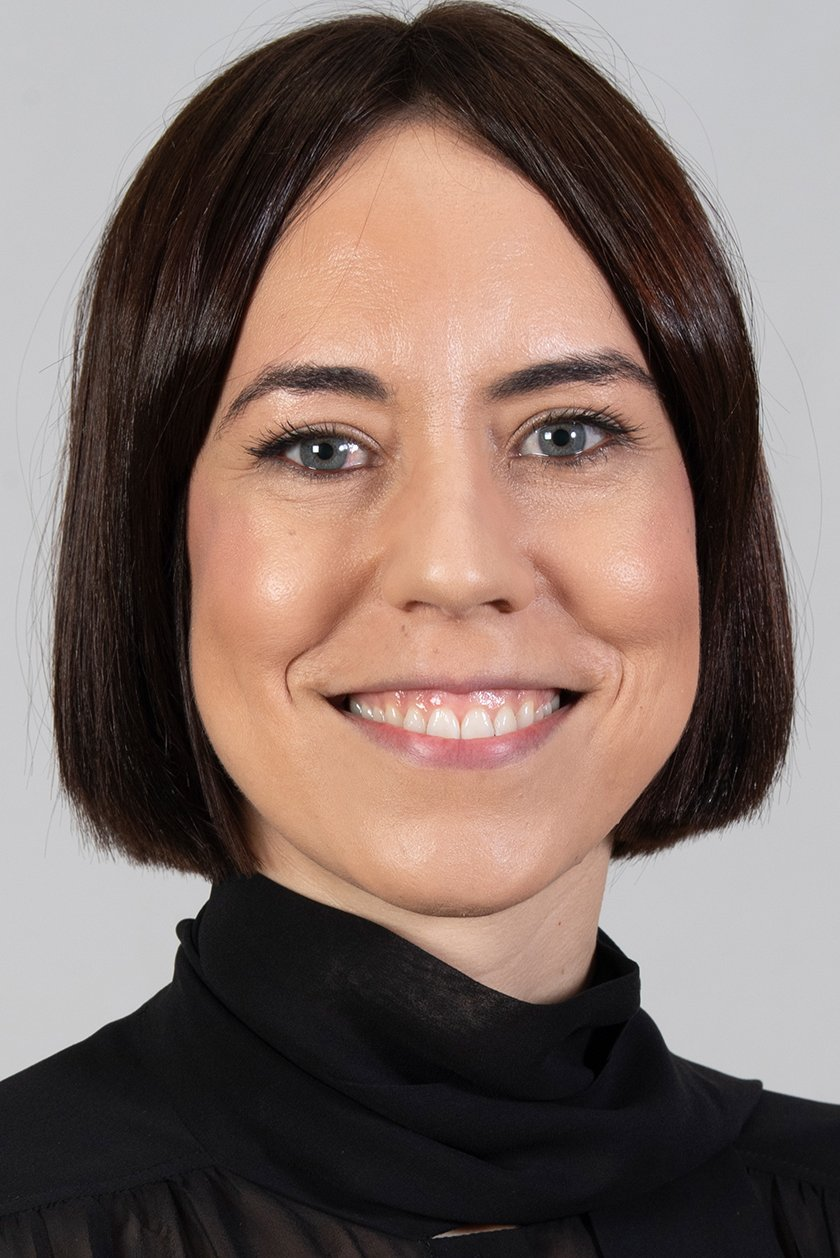
- Official portrait, 2023

Minister of Science, Innovation and Universities
- Incumbent
- Assumed office 12 July 2021
- Prime Minister: Pedro Sánchez
- Preceded by: Pedro Duque (Science and Innovation); Joan Subirats (Universities)

Secretary-General of the Socialist Party of the Valencian Country
- Incumbent
- Assumed office 24 March 2024
- Preceded by: Ximo Puig

Mayor of Gandia
- In office 13 June 2015 – 11 July 2021
- Preceded by: Arturo Torró
- Succeeded by: José Manuel Prieto

Member of the Congress of Deputies
- In office 17 August – 1 December 2023
- Succeeded by: Víctor Camino Miñana
- Constituency: Valencia

Personal details
- Born: 25 June 1980 (age 46) Gandia, Valencia, Spain
- Party: Spanish Socialist Workers' Party
- Other political affiliations: PSPV-PSOE
- Education: Technical University of Valencia

Diana Morant Ripoll (Valencian: [diˈana moˈɾant]; born 25 June 1980) is a Spanish politician who has been Minister of Science and Innovation since 12 July 2021. She has been Secretary-General of the Socialist Party of the Valencian Country since 2024 and Mayor of Gandia (Valencia) from June 2015 until July 2021. She was also member of the Corts Valencianes, the regional assembly of the Valencia region, from July 2015 to May 2017.

== Career ==
In October 2014, Morant took part in the PSPV's selection process for mayoral candidates. She was unopposed, so she was proclaimed the party's mayoral candidate for Gandia for the 2015 Spanish local elections. In the municipal elections of 2015, the People's Party won 12 seats in the council, the PSPV-PSOE 7, the coalition Més Gandia 5, and Citizens 1. Three weeks later, on 13 June 2015, at the plenary session, Morant obtained the support of the councillors of the PSPV-PSOE, Més Gandia and the mayor of Citizens, thus becoming mayor of Gandia, thereby ending four years of PP government.

Morant resigned as mayor on 11 July 2021 after being nominated for the office of Minister of Science, Innovation and Universities by prime minister Pedro Sánchez.
