= Rob Shields =

Canadian sociologist

- Born: 9 June 1961 (age 65); Toronto, Ontario
- Awards: Commonwealth Scholar; Henry Marshall Tory Chair; Canadian Partnership Group in Science and Education "Leader of the Future" Award 2004

Education
- Education: Sussex University

Philosophical work
- Institutions: University of Alberta
- Main interests: Social theory, cities as social spaces
- Notable works: Places on the Margin
- Notable ideas: Social spatialisation, cultural topology, virtuality

Robert MacArthur Shields (born 9 June 1961 in Toronto, Ontario) is a Canadian sociologist and cultural theorist. He is Professor and Henry Marshall Tory Endowed Research Chair at University of Alberta. Shields directs the City Region Studies Centre in the Faculty of Extension. From 1991 to 2004 he rose to Professor of Sociology and Directed the Institute for Interdisciplinary Studies at Carleton University, Ottawa Canada, with an interlude in 1995-97 as a lecturer in Culture and Communications at Lancaster University, Lancaster UK.

Education: Architecture (B.A. Directed Interdisciplinary Studies, Carleton University, Ottawa Canada), Sociology (M.A. Carleton University) and Urban and Regional Studies (D.Phil., University of Sussex).

== Contributions and notable impacts ==
Shields founded the journal, Space and Culture: International journal of social spaces in 1997 and Curb Canadian Planning Magazine in 2009. Curb ceased publication in 2016.

His 1991 book Places on the Margin, won a Library Choice 'Book of the Year' award for demonstrating a theory of Social Spatialisations. Shields argued that geographical places were understood through a network of contrasting places. Social spatialisation influences social action through embodied habit and casting locations as "places for this and places for that". This had significant impact on human geographical definitions of spatiality and understanding of the social and political aspects of geographical space.

Shields' approach is related to Henri Lefebvre's social production of space.

Shields' interest in spatial and cultural categories led to work on Virtuality in which he argued that intangibles social spatialisations were real, not abstract ideas or "socially constructed" beliefs. 5. His theory of Cultural Topologies extends spatialisation to time by considering cultural conflicts and collective memory and rhythms of places as time-space manifolds Shields introduces the application of topological concepts to the analysis of cultural senses of temporality as well as spatiality or spatialisation) using the example of the historical problem of the Seven Bridges of Königsburg solved by Leonard Euler. Recent work includes urban studies of walkability and pedestrians' experience of the city.

== Published works ==
Books and Edited Works

Spatial Questions: Social Spatialisations and Cultural Topologies. London: Sage. 2013. 197pp. Mandarin translation 空间问题 Phoenix Educational Publishers, Nanjing 2017. ISBN 9781848606654

The Virtual. London: Routledge. 2003. 272pp. ISBN 9780415281812

Lefebvre, Love and Struggle: Spatial Dialectics. London: Routledge, 1999. 218pp. ISBN 9780415093705

Places on the Margin: Alternative Geographies of Modernity. International Library of Sociology, London: Routledge Chapman Hall, 1991. 334 pp. Library Choice Outstanding Publication of the Year Award. ISBN 0-415-08022-3

City-Regions in Prospect: Place meets Practice. Co-Editor with Kevin Jones and Alex Lord. McGill-Queen's University Press. 2015. ISBN 9780773546042

Re-reading Jean-François Lyotard. Essays on his later works. Co-Editor with Heidi Bickis. London: Ashgate. 2013. ISBN 9781409435679

Demystifying Deleuze. An Introductory assemblage of crucial concepts. Co-Editor with Michael Vallee. Ottawa: Red Quill Books. 2013. ISBN 978-1926958200

Strip-Appeal: Reimagining the Suburban Mini-mall Design Competition. Co-edited with M. Patchett. Edmonton: City Region Studies Centre / Space and Culture Publications. 2012.

Ecologies of Affect: Placing Nostalgia, Desire and Hope. Co-Editor with Tonya Davidson and Ondine Park, Waterloo: Wilfrid Laurier University Press. 2011. ISBN 9781554582587

What is a City? Rethinking the Urban After Katrina. Co-Editor with Philip Steinberg, Athens: Georgia University Press. 2008. 233pp. ISBN 978-0-8203-3094-5

Building Tomorrow: Innovation in Engineering and Construction. Co-Editor with André Manseau, London: Ashgate. 2005. 184pp. ISBN 0754643786

Cultures of Internet. Rob Shields (ed.) London: Sage, 1996. 196pp. ISBN 9781446225905 Translated into Serbo-Croatian as Kulture Interneta Zagreb: Naklada Jesefnski I Turk, Hrvatscko socioloko drutvo. 2001.

Social Engineering, The Technics of Change. Co-Editor with Adam Podgorecki and Jon Alexander, Ottawa: Carleton University Press, 1996. 359pp. ISBN 9780773596009

Life Style Shopping: The Subject of Consumption. International Library of Sociology, London: Routledge, 1993. 239pp. ISBN 9781138152533 Excerpts translated into Russian and German.
