= Virtuality (philosophy) =

Concept in philosophy

Virtuality is a concept with a long history in philosophy, its most notable recent version being that developed by French thinker Gilles Deleuze.

== Overview ==
Deleuze used the term virtual to refer to an aspect of reality that is ideal, but nonetheless real. An example of this is the meaning, or sense, of a proposition that is not a material aspect of that proposition (whether written or spoken) but is nonetheless an attribute of that proposition. In Bergsonism, Deleuze writes that "virtual" is not opposed to "real" but opposed to "actual", whereas "real" is opposed to "possible". Deleuze identifies the virtual, considered as a continuous multiplicity, with Bergson's "duration": "it is the virtual insofar as it is actualized, in the course of being actualized, it is inseparable from the movement of its actualization."

Deleuze argues that Henri Bergson developed "the notion of the virtual to its highest degree" and that he based his entire philosophy on it. Both Henri Bergson, and Deleuze himself build their conception of the virtual in reference to a quotation in which writer Marcel Proust defines a virtuality, memory as "real but not actual, ideal but not abstract".

== Reception ==
Another core meaning has been elicited by Denis Berthier, in his 2004 book Méditations sur le réel et le virtuel ("Meditations on the real and the virtual"), based on uses in science (virtual image), technology (virtual world), and etymology (derivation from virtue—Latin virtus). At the same ontological level as "the possible" (i.e. ideally-possible) abstractions, representations, or imagined "fictions", the actually-real "material", or the actually-possible "probable", the "virtual" is "ideal-real". It is what is not real, but displays the full qualities of the real—in a plainly actual (i.e., not potential)—way. The prototypical case is a reflection in a mirror: it is already there, whether or not one can see it; it is not waiting for any kind of actualization. This definition allows one to understand that real effects may be issued from a virtual object, so that our perception of it and our whole relation to it, are fully real, even if it is not. This explains how virtual reality can be used to cure phobias.

Brian Massumi shows the political implications of this. According to Massumi in Parables for the Virtual, the virtual is something "inaccessible to the senses" and can be felt in its effects. His definition goes on to explain virtuality through the use of a topological figure, in which stills of all of the steps in its transformation superposed would create a virtual image. Its virtuality lies in its inability to be seen or properly diagramed, yet can be figured in the imagination.

However, note that the writers above all use terms such as "possible", "potential" and "real" in different ways and relate the virtual to these other terms differently. Deleuze regards the opposite of the virtual as the actual. Rob Shields argues that the opposite of the virtual is the material for there are other actualities such as a probability (e.g., "risks" are actual dangers that have not yet materialized but there is a "probability" that they will). Among Deleuzians, Alexander Bard & Jan Söderqvist even argue (in agreement with Quentin Meillassoux) in Process and Event that virtuality must be separated from potentiality, and consequently suggest the potential of the current as the link between the virtual of the future and the actual of the past.

== See also ==
- Neuromantic (philosophy) – Term denoting a mental state
- Virtù – Concept theorized by Machiavelli

== Sources ==
- Deleuze, Gilles. 1966. Bergsonism. Trans. Hugh Tomlinson and Barbara Habberjam. NY: Zone, 1991. ISBN 0-942299-07-8.
- ---. 2002a. Desert Islands and Other Texts 1953-1974. Trans. David Lapoujade. Ed. Michael Taormina. Semiotext(e) Foreign Agents ser. Los Angeles and New York: Semiotext(e), 2004. ISBN 1-58435-018-0.
- ---. 2002b. "The Actual and the Virtual." In Dialogues II. Rev. ed. Trans. Eliot Ross Albert. New York and Chichester: Columbia UP. 148–152. ISBN 0-8264-9077-8.
- Christine Buci-Glucksmann, La folie du voir: Une esthétique du virtuel, Galilée, 2002
- Massumi, Brian. 2002. Parables for the Virtual: Movement, Affect, Sensation. Post-Contemporary Interventions ser. Durham and London: Duke UP. ISBN 0-8223-2897-6.
- "Origins of Virtualism: An Interview with Frank Popper conducted by Joseph Nechvatal", CAA Art Journal, Spring 2004, pp. 62–77
- Frank Popper, From Technological to Virtual Art, Leonardo Books, MIT Press, 2007
- Rob Shields, The Virtual Routledge 2003.
- Rob Shields "Virtualities", Theory, Culture & Society 23:2-3. 2006. pp. 284–86.
