= Neuromantic =

Neuromantic may refer to:

- Neuromantic (philosophy), a philosophical concept by Bradd Shore
- Neuromantic (album), a 1981 album by Yukihiro Takahashi

== See also ==
- Neuromancer (disambiguation)
