= Subirats (surname) =

Subirats is a surname. Notable people with the surname include:

- Agustí Querol Subirats (1860–1909), Spanish sculptor
- Albert Subirats (born 1986), Venezuelan swimmer
- Javier Subirats (born 1957), Spanish footballer
- Joan Subirats (born 1951), Spanish political scientist
