= Docent =

Person who teaches at universities and educational institutions

Docent (/ˈdoʊ.sənt/ DOH-sənt) is an academic qualification that shows that the holder is qualified to be employed at the level of associate or full professor. It is derived from the Latin word docens, which is the present active participle of docere ('to teach, to lecture'). Becoming a docent is often referred to as habilitation or doctor of science. The title of docent is conferred by some European universities to denote a specific academic appointment within a set structure of academic ranks at or below the full professor rank, similar to a British readership, a French maître de conférences (MCF), and equal to or above the title of assistant professor.

Docent is the highest academic title in several countries, and the qualifying criteria are research output that corresponds to 3–5 doctoral dissertations, supervision of PhD students, and experience in teaching at the undergraduate and graduate level. Docent is also used at some (mainly German) universities generically for a person who has the right to teach. In Southeast European countries, it is the first position that people achieve once they enter the University, and after the completion of their PhD degree.

== Belgium ==
In the Flemish universities of Belgium docent is the first of four university professor ranks, the others being hoofddocent (head docent), hoogleraar (professor) and gewoon hoogleraar. To be awarded the docent title at the Flemish universities, a candidate has to have a doctorate. In the French-speaking universities, the word docent is not used in their titles.

== Germany, Austria, and Switzerland ==
In Germany, Austria, and in the German-speaking part of Switzerland, Dozent or Hochschuldozent denotes an academic appointment at a university or similar institution, at a mid-level ranking of seniority.

The title of Privatdozent can be awarded (with certain conditions) to those who have successfully completed a Habilitation, thereby denoting that its holder has the right to independently teach without being supervised by a full professor. In this way, a Privatdozent may for instance hold an appointment as Dozent or Hochschuldozent (on either a temporary or permanent basis as academic employee).

== France ==
In Francophone countries (particularly in France), Maître de conférences (MCF) may refer to docent, equivalent to associate professor in the US or senior reader in the UK. It is a tenured academic post enjoying the status of civil servant (fonctionnaire d'Etat). The French Ministry of Higher Education provided a table summarizing the equivalent academic ranks of professeur and Maître de conférences in other countries.

== Central and Eastern Europe ==
In countries with academic traditions that stem from German-speaking countries, docent is an academic appointment below that of a full professor. This is the situation in the Czech Republic, Hungary, Poland, Slovakia, and Slovenia. Docent is considered equal to or above the title associate professor as used in Western European countries. In the Czech Republic, a docent holder is considered capable of conducting research independently as well as giving lectures.

In Russia, Ukraine, and Belarus, docent is an academic title below professor.

In Poland, the title of docent used to be mandatory in order to become a full professor. This is no longer a requirement, and the title has nearly vanished in the last 20 years. Currently, it may be given to a teacher or instructor not engaged in research. Only a scientific researcher may apply for the title of professor, and therefore docent is the highest title for teachers and instructors.

In countries such as Lithuania, Bulgaria, docent is used as an academic title equivalent to associate professor in German-speaking countries.

In most former Yugoslav countries, including Bosnia and Herzegovina, Croatia, Montenegro, North Macedonia and Serbia, the system of academic ranks is similar to that of North America. The academic rank of docent corresponds to assistant professor.

In Armenia and Azerbaijan, the title of docent—equivalent to associate professor—is awarded to either a Candidate of Sciences or a Doctor of Sciences before becoming a full professor.

== Northern Europe ==
In Denmark and Norway, docent is traditionally a title ranking between associate professor and professor, similar to a readership in the United Kingdom. All docents at universities in Norway became full professors in 1985 when the traditional title of docent was abolished. In 2006 the title of docent was reintroduced as the new title of the former teaching docents in Norway; while administratively on the same level as professors, the promotion criteria are different and based on teaching.

In Finland, Sweden, Estonia, and Latvia, docent (Finnish dosentti, Swedish docent, Estonian dotsent, Latvian docents) is an academic title conferred to a person fulfilling requirements similar to that of a German Privatdozent. Such persons are usually expected to give lectures on their specialties if their professional activities permit this. Most docents are employed at the university where they are docents, but usually in a different position (often with the title senior lecturer; universitetslektor). The Scandinavian title docent as used in e.g. Sweden is often translated into English as reader to avoid confusion with foreign uses of the term docent. In Finland, the Docents' Union of Finland recommends the term associate professor in English, while the University of Helsinki uses the title of docent.

=== Sweden ===
The title of docent is the second highest grade in the Swedish academic system, the highest being (full) professor. A docentship should be regarded as an educational title not connected with the employment pyramid as such. This is rather an assurance of the level of expertise, to enable the person to advance further in his/her academic career. A docent qualification is required of all head doctoral student supervisors. For conferment of the title, there is a requirement that the researcher have a good overview of their research area and have demonstrated both the ability to formulate research problems and to have independently carried out research programs. It is a requirement that the researcher be able to lead research projects. The researcher must have substantial scientific research experience and be well published in scientific journals.

In Sweden, there used to be both stipendiary (docentstipendiat) and non-stipendiary (oavlönad docent) docent positions. A stipendiary docent both held the title of docent (for life) and benefited from a stipend that paid for their salary at the university for up to six years. The non-stipendiary alternative was solely an academic title (also for life). Today, most universities only confer a non-stipendiary docent title. The Swedish University of Agricultural Sciences and the Chalmers University of Technology still maintain the stipendiary docent. The title is in most cases awarded to people employed as an assistant professor (biträdande universitetslektor), or associate professor (universitetslektor/senior lecturer) with a distinguished international reputation after a rigorous review of their research. Docent can be used as an English term for the Swedish title docent. Since the Swedish title docent is rather a mark of competence than a job title, it is in some contexts less appropriate to use the terms reader and associate professor as English translations.

=== Finland ===
In Finland, docent is solely an academic title (Finnish: dosentti, Swedish: docent) awarded by a university. The title is often translated as adjunct professor or associate professor to make the title more comparable to those of university systems in English-speaking countries. The title of docent can either be awarded for life or for a stipulated period of time, depending on the decision of the unit that confers it. As a prerequisite, a candidate must have comprehensive knowledge of their own field, a capacity for independent research or artistic work demonstrated through publication or some other manner, and good teaching skills. The applicant must have scientific publications at least equivalent to the extent of two doctoral theses in their field. Candidates are required to give a lecture demonstrating their teaching skills and are evaluated by an academic committee.

While traditionally a docentship used to be a formal position without a salary, the 2009 change in legislation changed it to a title only. Thus, a docentship is nowadays an official recognition of individual expertise as well as a title equivalent to that of an associate professor and also bestowing the right to teach (Latin: venia legendi) and supervise doctoral students independently. Docents may work as professors, associate professors, assistant professors, university lecturers, or researchers at the university or work elsewhere full time. The rank of docent entitles the holder to teach at universities and to be a principal researcher, lead research groups, and act as the responsible supervisor of doctoral students.

According to Finnish legislation, The title cannot be revoked under any circumstance. There has been some discussion among academics whether revocation should be possible in cases such as a criminal conviction.

=== Norway ===
Traditional use at universities until 1985

In Norway, the title of docent (Norwegian: dosent) was traditionally used for positions immediately below full professors and above those holding the title førsteamanuensis (corresponding to associate professor in the US and senior lecturer in the Commonwealth) until 1985. The requirements were the same as for full university professors, but until then, each department usually only had one professor and other academics with similar qualifications were appointed as docents. Hence, docents could be seen as professors without chair (professor extraordinarius). The title was comparable to reader or associate professor in many Commonwealth countries and professor extraordinarius in continental Europe. All docents were lifted to full professor status in 1985, when the title was abolished at the universities.

College docent and (teaching) docent

The title docent remained in use in the rural colleges (Norwegian: distriktshøgskoler), in the form of college docent (Norwegian: høgskoledosent), which is a position focused on teaching that ranks below professors. In the 2000s only a handful of people still held the title college docent. In 1995, the college docents received the right to apply for promotion to professor. In 2003, the position teaching docent (Norwegian: undervisningsdosent) was introduced. The title was changed to just docent (Norwegian: dosent) in 2006, although it is not a successor of the earlier docent position as used in the universities prior to 1985. The position is similar to college docent and focused on teaching activities rather than research.

Both the titles college docent and (teaching) docent are almost exclusively used in the colleges and new universities, and usually not used in the old universities. (Teaching) docent is ranked within the state pay grade system as administratively equivalent to the position of professor, but promotion to docent is based on a different set of merits, with more emphasis on teaching qualifications relative to research merits than in professorial appointments. Persons holding a permanent position as senior teaching fellow (Norwegian: førstelektor) at a university or university college may apply for promotion to docent. After the 2006 changes there are three parallel academic career ladders in Norway, one focused on both research and teaching, one focused on research and one focused on teaching.

== Portugal, Spain, and the Netherlands ==
In Portugal, Spain and the Netherlands, docente (Portuguese and Spanish) and docent (Dutch) are a synonym for 'teacher' as well as 'professor', and are widely used across all academic ranks.

In Spain, an academic with a docent level is one who has been given the accreditation profesor titular de universidad by the National Agency for Quality Assessment and Accreditation (Agencia Nacional de Evaluación de la Calidad y Acreditación, ANECA). This is the equivalent to associate professor in the UK or Dozent in Germany. The following level evaluated by ANECA is catedrático de universidad, that is 'university professor', according to European standards.

== Latin America ==
In Latin America, the term docente is not commonly used as an academic rank or formal title within regional higher-education systems. Instead, docente is the standard lexeme used for teacher or instructor at all levels of formal education, from primary and secondary schools to tertiary institutions. This term encompasses a broad category of educators rather than signifying a specific academic rank as understood in some European contexts.

== Indonesia and South Africa ==
In South Africa, the Afrikaans word dosent refers to any full-time university lecturer, independent of rank, while in Indonesia, the Indonesian word dosen refers to any tertiary education lecturer, independent of rank.

== Turkey ==
In Turkey, doçent is an academic appointment equivalent to an associate professor, ranking between instructor doctor and professor. A doçent candidate has to have a doctor's degree and must meet the requirements provided by the interuniversity board. The title of docent is mandatory in order to become a full professor. In recent years there is no longer need for a docent thesis; rather a candidate must provide evidence of a number of journal papers, or a research-level book in their field with a detail equivalent to journal article.

== See also ==
- Museum docent, the title given in the United States to people who serve as guides and educators for the institutions they serve, usually as a volunteer.
