= Network society =

Concept in sociology

Network society is the set of social, political, economic, and cultural changes brought about by the widespread use of networked digital information and communication technologies.

The intellectual origins of the idea can be traced back to the work of early social theorists such as Georg Simmel who analyzed the effect of modernization and industrial capitalism on complex patterns of affiliation, organization, production and experience.

== Origins ==
The term network society was coined by Jan van Dijk in his 1991 Dutch book De Netwerkmaatschappij (The Network Society) and by Manuel Castells in The Rise of the Network Society (1996), the first part of his trilogy The Information Age. In 1978 James Martin used the related term 'The Wired Society' indicating a society that is connected by mass- and telecommunication networks.

Van Dijk defines the network society as a society in which a combination of social and media networks shapes its prime mode of organization and most important structures at all levels (individual, organizational and societal). He compares this type of society to a mass society that is shaped by groups, organizations and communities ('masses') organized in physical co-presence.

Manuel Castells defines the network society as a new social structure emerging from advances in information and communication technologies. It represents a shift from industrial production to a knowledge economy, where information flows across global networks.

Key concepts include:

- Space of Flows: The technological ability to engage in activities across distances without physical proximity. Functions like financial markets and media networks operate within this space.
- Timeless Time: A condition where traditional sequences of social time are disrupted, allowing for asynchronous interactions and random disturbances.

The network society alters the experience of space and time, leading to flexible work arrangements, precarious employment, and global interconnectivity. These changes reinforce new class divisions and reshape relationships between individuals and institutions.

== Wellman, Hiltz, and Turoff ==
Wellman studied the network society as a sociologist at the University of Toronto. His first formal work was in 1973, "The Network City" with a more comprehensive theoretical statement in 1988. Since his 1979 "The Community Question", Wellman has argued that societies at any scale are best seen as networks (and "networks of networks") rather than as bounded groups in hierarchical structures. More recently, Wellman has contributed to the theory of social network analysis with an emphasis on individualized networks, also known as "networked individualism". In his studies, Wellman focuses on three main points of the network society: community, work and organizations. He states that with recent technological advances an individual's community can be socially and spatially diversified. Organizations can also benefit from the expansion of networks in that having ties with members of different organizations can help with specific issues.

In 1978, Roxanne Hiltz and Murray Turoff's The Network Nation explicitly built on Wellman's community analysis, taking the book's title from Craven and Wellman's "The Network City". The book argued that computer supported communication could transform society. It was remarkably prescient, as it was written well before the advent of the Internet. Turoff and Hiltz were the progenitors of an early computer supported communication system, called EIES.

== Manuel Castells ==
According to Castells, networks constitute the new social morphology of our societies. When interviewed by Harry Kreisler from the University of California Berkeley, Castells said "...the definition, if you wish, in concrete terms of a network society is a society where the key social structures and activities are organized around electronically processed information networks. So it's not just about networks or social networks, because social networks have been very old forms of social organization. It's about social networks which process and manage information and are using micro-electronic based technologies." The diffusion of a networking logic substantially modifies the operation and outcomes in processes of production, experience, power, and culture. For Castells, networks have become the basic units of modern society. Van Dijk does not go that far; for him these units still are individuals, groups, organizations and communities, though they may increasingly be linked by networks.

The network society goes further than the information society that is often proclaimed. Castells argues that it is not purely the technology that defines modern societies, but also cultural, economic and political factors that make up the network society. Influences such as religion, cultural upbringing, political organizations, and social status all shape the network society. Societies are shaped by these factors in many ways. These influences can either raise or hinder these societies. For van Dijk, information forms the substance of contemporary society, while networks shape the organizational forms and infrastructures of this society.

The space of flows plays a central role in Castells' vision of the network society. It is a network of communications, defined by hubs where these networks crisscross. Élites in cities are not attached to a particular locality but to the space of flows.

Castells puts great importance on the networks and argues that the real power is to be found within the networks rather than confined in global cities. This contrasts with other theorists who rank cities hierarchically.

== Jan van Dijk ==
Van Dijk has defined the idea "network society" as a form of society increasingly organizing its relationships in media networks gradually replacing or complementing the social networks of face-to-face communication. Personal and social-network communication is supported by digital technology. This means that social and media networks are shaping the prime mode of organization and most important structures of modern society.

Van Dijk's The Network Society describes what the network society is and what it might be like in the future. The first conclusion of this book is that modern society is in a process of becoming a network society. This means that on the internet interpersonal, organizational, and mass communication come together. People become linked to one another and have access to information and communication with one another constantly. Using the internet brings the “whole world” into homes and work places. Also, when media like the internet becomes even more advanced it will gradually appear as “normal media” in the first decade of the 21st century as it becomes used by larger sections of the population and by vested interests in the economy, politics and culture. It asserts that paper means of communication will become out of date, with newspapers and letters becoming ancient forms for spreading information.

== Interaction with new media ==
New media are “media which are both integrated and interactive and also use digital code at the turn of the 20th and 21st centuries.”

In western societies, the individual linked by networks is becoming the basic unit of the network society. In eastern societies, this might still be the group (family, community, work team) linked by networks. In the contemporary process of individualisation, the basic unit of the network society has become the individual who is linked by networks. This is caused by simultaneous scale extension (nationalisation and internationalisation) and scale reduction (smaller living and working environments) Other kinds of communities arise. Daily living and working environments are getting smaller and more heterogenous, while the range of the division of labour, interpersonal communications and mass media extends. So, the scale of the network society is both extended and reduced as compared to the mass society. The scope of the network society is both global and local, sometimes indicated as “glocal”. The organization of its components (individuals, groups, organizations) is no longer tied to particular times and places. Aided by information and communication technology, these coordinates of existence can be transcended to create virtual times and places and to simultaneously act, perceive and think in global and local terms.

There is an explosion of horizontal networks of communication, quite independent from media business and governments, that allows the emergence of what can be called self-directed mass communication. It is mass communication because it is diffused throughout the Internet, so it potentially reaches the whole planet. It is self-directed because it is often initiated by individuals or groups by themselves bypassing the media system. The explosion of blogs, vlogs, podding, streaming and other forms of interactive, computer to computer communication set up a new system of global, horizontal communication Networks that, for the first time in history, allow people to communicate with each other without going through the channels set up by the institutions of society for socialized communication.

What results from this evolution is that the culture of the network society is largely shaped by the messages exchanged in the composite electronic hypertext made by the technologically linked networks of different communication modes. In the network society, virtuality is the foundation of reality through the new forms of socialized communication. Society shapes technology according to the needs, values and interests of people who use the technology. Furthermore, information and communication technologies are particularly sensitive to the effects of social uses on technology itself. The history of the internet provides ample evidence that the users, particularly the first thousands of users, were, to a large extent, the producers of the technology. However, technology is a necessary, albeit not sufficient condition for the emergence of a new form of social organization based on networking, that is on the diffusion of networking in all realms of activity on the basis of digital communication networks.

== Modern examples ==
The concepts described by Jan van Dijk, Barry Wellman, Hiltz and Turoff, and Manuel Castells are embodied in much digital technology. Social networking sites such as Facebook and Twitter, instant messaging and email are examples of the Network Society at work. These web services allow people to remotely communicate through digital means without face-to-face contact. This demonstrates how the ideas of society changing will affect the persons we communicate over time.

Network society does not have any confinements and has found its way to the global scale. Network society is developed in modern society that allows for a great deal of information to be traded to help improve information and communication technologies. Easier communication also introduces has consequences. This allows for globalization to take place by having more and more people joining the online society and learning about different techniques with the world wide web. This benefits users who have access to the internet, to stay connected at all times with any topic the user wants. Individuals without internet may be affected because they are not directly connected into this society. People always have an option to find public space with computers with internet. This allows a user to keep up with the ever changing system. Network society is constantly changing the “cultural production in a hyper-connected world.”

Social Structures revolve around the relationship of the “production/consumption, power, and experience.” These create a culture, which continues to sustain by getting new information constantly. Our society system was a mass media system where it was a more general place for information. Now the system is more individualized and custom system for users making the internet more personal. This makes messages to the audience more inclusive sent into society, ultimately allowing more sources to be included to better communication. Network society is seen as a global system that helps with globalization. These networks, that have now been digitized, are more efficient of connecting people. Information can be put into a computer and processed, and users put messages online for others to read and learn about, allowing people to gain knowledge faster and more efficiently. Networked society allows for people to connect to each other quicker and to engage more actively. These networks go away from having a central theme, but still have a focus in what it is there to accomplish.

== See also ==
- Commons-based peer production
- Complex systems
- Digital citizen
- Digital Revolution
- Globalization
- Information Age
- Information society
- Knowledge spillover
- Late modernity
- Network economy
- Network analysis
- Post-industrial society
- Sharing economy
- Social Age
- Social networking service
- Social peer-to-peer processes
- Social system
- The Wealth of Networks
