= Organization theory (Castells) =

The theory of the Information Age is deeply rooted in organization theory. This may come as a surprise since Manuel Castells is perhaps more readily associated with either the study of the Internet, cities and regions, or social movements. There are two points to be made about the parallels with organization theory. First, Castells sees himself as picking up Max Weber's mantle in both his use of historical sociology and in his style of theory. Second, the informational economy is not the direct result of the rise of new ICTs (Information and Communication Technologies). Rather, it is the convergence of those technologies with an older and autonomous process of network forms of organizing with their focus on flexibility and adaptability as key modes of organizing. This is a shift that organization theorists have been discussing and documenting since the appearance of open systems perspectives in the 1960s.

== Overview ==
Castells documents how the 1970s marked a shift towards new organizational forms; these changes were parallel to the rise of new information technologies, but not dependent on them because the changes emerged to deal with economic uncertainties rooted in the increasing globalization of trade and the structural crises of capitalism in the 1970s; the network enterprise is focused on leaner production and altered relations to labor.

Network researchers (see social networks) do not seem to have adopted Castells' framework. This may be due to his use of "network" in more qualitative terms or the lack of his use of the standard network toolkit.

A close reading of how he understands and builds his theory from networks, as opposed to merely using it as a metaphor, reveals more sympathy to the spirit of relationalism and hence to much network research.

1. First, networks are the primary unit of social organization. Castells argues that there is a new "variable geometry" that connects economic activity, states, and society. This variable geometry is the network. "The network is the unit, not the node." By this, Castells invokes a series of key ideas about networks as fundamental geometry.
2. Second, networks are flexible and endlessly reconfiguring. The relentless hyper-competition of global commodity production throughout sourcing and integrated supply chains is one example.
3. Third, they have a fundamental logic tied to cultural meanings: for each network, culture is embedded in binary exclusion/inclusion states. Whatever nodes do not enhance that network's logic are soon decoupled. In the global financial meta-network, production centers that do not enhance short-term return are soon excluded as the numerous financial crises from Mexico (1994), Asia (1997–98), Russia (1998), and now the US (2008–) amply demonstrate.
4. Fourth, networks have porous and mobile boundaries such that they might as well be infinitely adaptable.

== Sources ==
- Castells, Manuel. The Rise of the Network Society. The Information Age: Economy, Society and Culture Vol. 1. Oxford: Blackwell, 1996.
- Castells, Manuel. The Internet Galaxy: Reflections on the Internet, Business, and Society. New York: Oxford University Press, 2001.
