= Lúcio Alberto Pinheiro dos Santos =

Lúcio Alberto Pinheiro dos Santos (Braga, 19 April 1889 – Rio de Janeiro, 11 November 1950) was a Portuguese philosopher and teacher, noted for coining the term and writing the first theory of rhythmanalysis, focused on its physiological dimensions. His ideas on rhythmanalysis have been later further developed by French philosophers Gaston Bachelard and Henri Lefebvre.

== Biography ==
Born in Braga on 19 April 1889, Lúcio Alberto Pinheiro dos Santos first studied law at the University of Coimbra. He later moved to Lisbon where he embarked on a teaching career. In 1917 he emigrated to Brazil, but returned in 1919 when appointed Professor at the Faculty of Arts of Coimbra, from where he moved in the same year to the Faculty of Arts of Porto. While teaching, he also served for a short period as an MP for the Guimarães constituency, and between 1923 and 1926 was the Head of the Education Services of Portuguese India.

Following the military coup of 1926, he went again into exile to Brazil. He published in 1931 the book Ritmanálise, which had no major impact at the time, but strongly influenced Gaston Bachelard. He died in Rio de Janeiro on 11 November 1950.
