= Víctor Camino Miñana =

Spanish politician (born 1994)

Member of the Congress of Deputies
- Incumbent
- Assumed office 1 December 2023
- Preceded by: Diana Morant
- Constituency: Madrid

Personal details
- Born: 1994 (age 31–32) Valencia, Valencian Community, Spain
- Party: Spanish Socialist Workers' Party

Víctor Camino Miñana (born 1994) is a Spanish politician from the Spanish Socialist Workers' Party. He was president of the Socialist Youth of Spain.

== See also ==
- 15th Congress of Deputies
