= Manuel Castells =

Spanish sociologist and politician

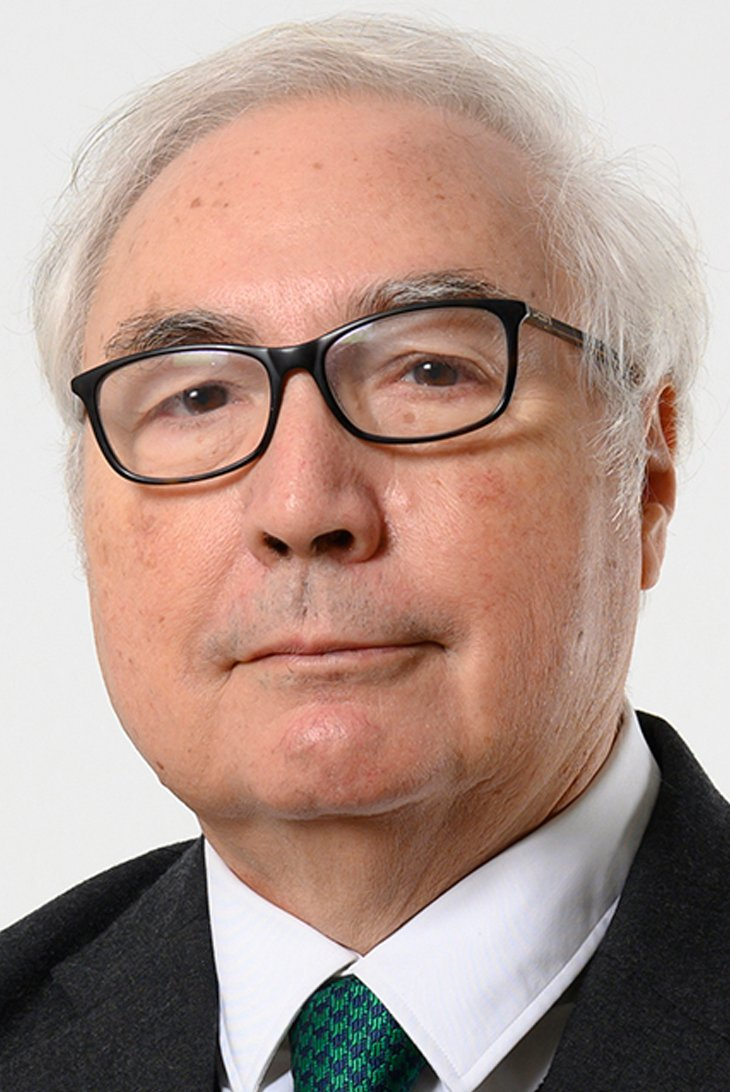
- Castells in 2020

Minister of Universities
- In office 13 January 2020 – 20 December 2021
- Monarch: Felipe VI
- Prime Minister: Pedro Sánchez
- Preceded by: Pedro Duque (Universities)
- Succeeded by: Joan Subirats

Personal details
- Born: 9 February 1942 (age 84) Hellín, Albacete, Spanish State
- Spouse: Emma Kiselyova
- Parents: Fernando Castells Adriaensens (father); Josefina Olivan Escartin (mother)
- Education: University of Paris
- Known for: Research on the information society, communication and globalization Organization theory Network society
- Website: www.manuelcastells.info/en
- Scientific career
- Fields: Sociology, urban planning, communication studies
- Workplaces: University of Cambridge; University of Southern California; Universitat Oberta de Catalunya (Open University of Catalonia); EHESS; University of Paris X: Nanterre
- Doctoral advisor: Alain Touraine
- Doctoral students: Ananya Roy; Sasha Costanza-Chock
- Other notable students: Daniel Cohn-Bendit

Manuel Castells Oliván (Catalan: [kəsˈteʎs]; born 9 February 1942) is a Spanish sociologist. He is well known for his authorship of a trilogy of works, entitled The Information Age: Economy, Society and Culture. He is a scholar of the information society, communication and globalization.

Castells is a full professor of sociology at the Open University of Catalonia (UOC) in Barcelona. He is also a university professor and the Wallis Annenberg Chair Professor of Communication Technology and Society at the University of Southern California's Annenberg School of Communication and Journalism in Los Angeles. Additionally, he is a professor emeritus of sociology and professor emeritus of city and regional planning at the University of California, Berkeley, where he taught for 24 years. He is also a fellow of St John's College at the University of Cambridge.

The 2000–2014 research survey of the Social Sciences Citation Index ranks him as the world's fifth most-cited social science scholar, and the foremost-cited communication scholar.

In 2012, Castells was awarded the Holberg Prize, for having "shaped our understanding of the political dynamics of urban and global economies in the network society." In 2013, he was awarded the Balzan Prize for Sociology for "his wide-ranging and imaginative thinking through of the implications of the great technological changes of our time."

In January 2020, he was appointed minister of universities in the second government of Pedro Sánchez in Spain, a position he held until his resignation in December 2021.

== Biography ==
=== Early life ===
Manuel Castells was born on February 9, 1942, in the city of Hellín, in the La Mancha region, under the Spanish State. His parents, Fernando Castells Adriaensens and Josefina Olivan Escartin were both civil servants. He also has a younger sister named Irene. He grew up in Madrid, Cartagena, and Valencia, where his father, a financial inspector, was posted to.

Politics was a part of Castells' life from an early age. He notes:

My parents were very good parents. It was a conservative family — very strongly conservative family. But I would say that the main thing that shaped my character besides my parents was the fact that I grew up in fascist Spain. It's difficult for people of the younger generation to realize what that means, even for the Spanish younger generation. You had actually to resist the whole environment, and to be yourself, you had to fight and to politicize yourself from the age of fifteen or sixteen.

Castells' engagement is evident in his early opposition to Francisco Franco’s semi-fascist regime. His father initially fought in its favor as a member of the Falange Party. Castells' father eventually abandoned this mentality, as he was no longer pleased with Franco's rule.

=== Early education and activism ===
Castells completed his secondary education in Barcelona two years ahead of time in 1958, after which he studied law and economics at the University of Barcelona. As a student, he took an interest in literature and theatre. Government censorship of plays and crackdown on student journals moved him to join the broad anti-Franco movement opposition group Workers' Front of Catalonia in 1960, and he read Marxist and anarchist theory alongside his activism. In May 1962, Castells participated in solidarity action with the miners' strike in the Asturias region.

During the repression that followed, he escaped to France, interrupting his studies in Barcelona. He successfully claimed political asylum with the help of a fellow Spanish opposition member and settled in Paris. In Paris, he completed his first degree at the Sorbonne in 1964 and earned a doctorate in sociology from the University of Paris in 1967. He was supervised by the sociologist Alain Touraine at the Nanterre Faculty of Arts and Humanities and his thesis committee also included sociologist Henri Lefebvre and geographer Jean Bastié.

=== Catalan identity ===
Castells identifies as Catalan largely because of his connection to Barcelona, which is recognized as the center of the Catalan movement for independence. He spent a large portion of his adolescence there, completing his secondary and beginning his college education at the University of Barcelona. Castells also traces his paternal lineage to the city. This aspect of Castells' identity is related to his resistance to Franco's oppressive regime. The Catalan language was not taught at school under Franco, and Castells' family, being from a Spanish speaking region of Spain, therefore did not speak it. However, he took the initiative to teach the language to himself while at University, which he states has helped him feel more connected to his Catalan identity. Castells is a Catalan nationalist, but not a separatist. He has expressed support for the Catalan Socialist Party.

=== Academic career ===
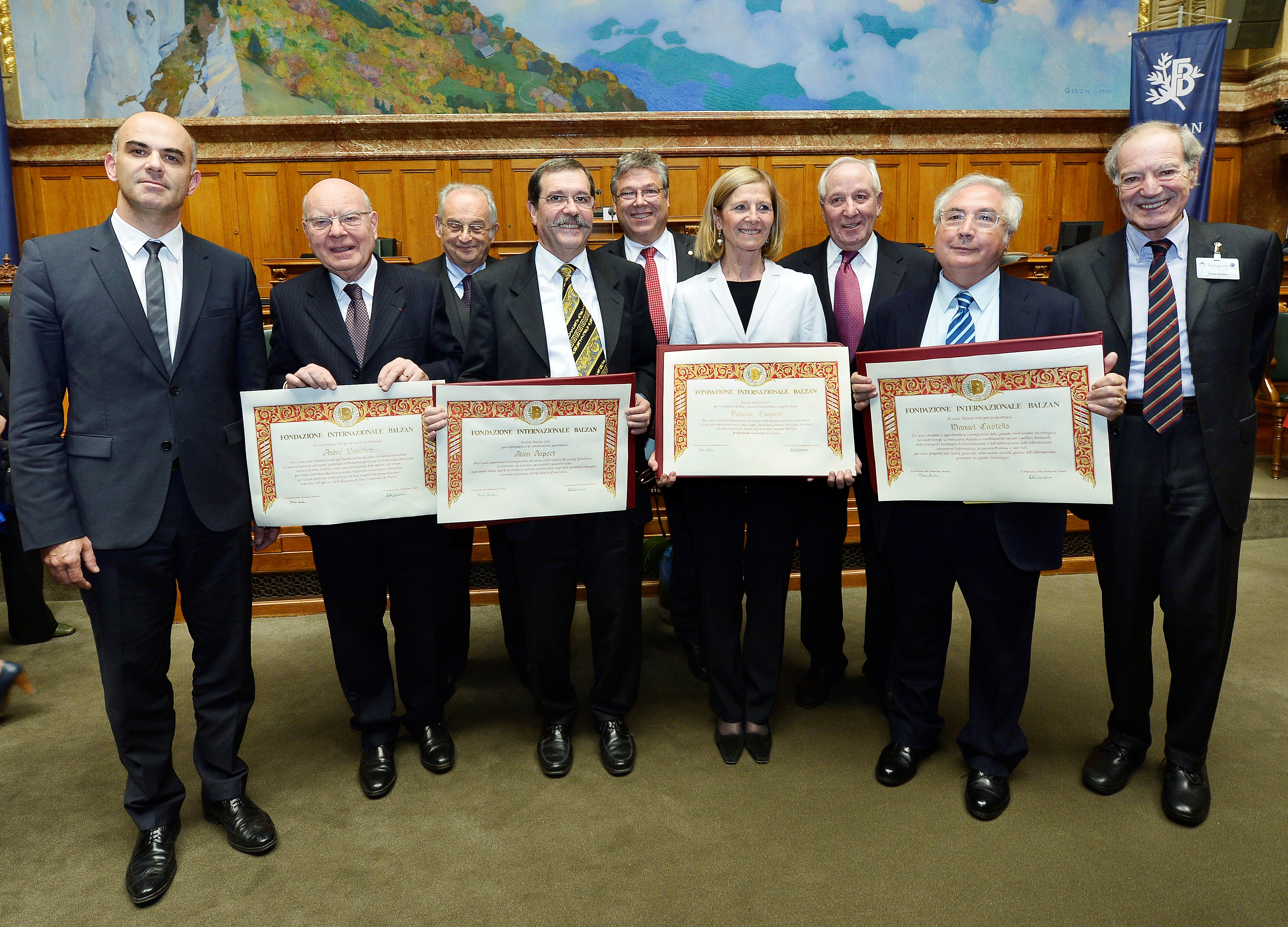
Castells and other recipients of the Balzan prize in 2013

Castells was appointed research assistant by his supervisor Alain Touraine at the Nanterre Faculty in 1966. From 1967 onwards, he worked as an instructor in several Parisian universities. He first taught at Nanterre, where Daniel Cohn-Bendit was among his students. He saw his contract there terminated as a result of the 1968 student protests. He spent a part of the period between 1968 and 1972 in Santiago, Chile, where he held visiting appointments at the University of Chile, working with the dependency theorists Fernando Henrique Cardoso and Enzo Faletto, and at the Pontifical Catholic University of Chile's Ford Foundation arm, the Interdisciplinary Committee for Urban Development (Centro Interdisciplinario de Desarrollo Urbano, CIDU) (a position he retained as late as April 1973). He taught at the École des Hautes Études en Sciences Sociales in Paris from 1970 to 1979.

In 1979, Castells joined the University of California, Berkeley, as a professor of sociology and a professor of city and regional planning.

In 2001, he was a research professor at the Open University of Catalonia in Barcelona. In 2003, he was appointed the inaugural Wallis Annenberg Chair of Communication and Technology at the University of Southern California's (USC) Annenberg School for Communication. He is a founding member of the USC Center on Public Diplomacy, a senior member of the diplomacy center's Faculty Advisory Council, and a member of the Annenberg Research Network on International Communication. He held the chair of network society at Fondation Maison des sciences de l'homme's Collège d’Études Mondiales in Paris (closed in 2020).

Castells lives between Spain and the United States. In 2008, he was appointed to the governing board of the European Institute of Innovation and Technology. He served as the minister of universities in Spain from January 2020 to December 2021.

== Theoretical contributions ==
The sociological work of Manuel Castells synthesizes empirical research literature with combinations of urban sociology, organization studies, internet studies, social movements, sociology of culture, and political economy. About the origins of the network society, he posits that changes to the network form of enterprise predate the electronic internet technologies (usually) associated with network organization forms (cf. Organization theory (Castells)).

=== Information Age ===
Castells' most well-known work is a trilogy of books, entitled The Information Age: Economy, Society and Culture. Overall, it comprehends three sociological dimensions—production, power, and experience—stressing that the organization of the economy, of the state and its institutions, and the ways that people create meaning in their lives through collective action, are irreducible sources of social dynamics—that must be understood as both discrete and inter-related entities.

The Information Age trilogy is his précis: "Our societies are increasingly structured around the bipolar opposition of the Net (social network) and the Self"; the "Social network" denotes the network organizations replacing vertically integrated hierarchies as the dominant form of social organization, the Self denotes the practices a person uses in reaffirming social identity and meaning in a continually changing cultural landscape. In other words, Castells' theory of the Information Age explores the dissonance between “universal, digital language,” and individual, even local identities. Our physical selves exist in different places and experience different cultures, but the mind has essentially migrated into the world of the internet and the television. They exist in a “global space of instant information".

Castells maintains that the Information Age can "unleash the power of the mind", which would dramatically increase the productivity of individuals and lead to greater leisure, allowing individuals to achieve "greater spiritual depth and more environmental consciousness". Such change would be positive, he argues, in that it would cause resource consumption to decrease.

Castells also became an established cybernetic culture theoretician with his Internet development analysis stressing the roles of the state (military and academic), social movements (computer hackers and social activists), and business, in shaping the economic infrastructure according to their (conflicting) interests.

==== Informationalism ====
Castells' concepts of The Information Age, The Age of Consumption, and The Network Society are all perspectives attempting to describe modern life as it is known in the present and to depict the future of society. As Castells suggests, contemporary society may be described as "replacing the antiquated metaphor of the machine with that of the network". Put simply, this quote exemplifies Castells' concept of “Informationalism.” He asserts that from the 1970s to the present day, informational technology has allowed large businesses, organizations, and social structures in general to form global networks. The world is growing away from industrialism, which is focused on economic growth. Informationalism strives to develop knowledge and create massive networks. This theory is, of course, related to the growth of capitalism. As networks grow larger, the state gradually plays a smaller role in the capitalist system. Common systems of information have begun to replace it. They act as a connector between networks that may very likely be on opposite sides of the globe.

This development does not come without some level of exclusion. For certain areas of the globe that are not as connected with mainstream society and massive international networks, it is becoming increasingly difficult to keep pace with the expansion of capitalism. Excluded communities respond by developing their own systems, which are often based in illicit economic activity. These illicit economic activities illustrate another of Castells' points, that resistance to globalization is a result of the development of the information age. He explains this using an example:

Well, if I have no value for these global networks of power, finance, technology, then I build my own value, my own system. I build my family. I build my nation. I build my God. And, if I am not listened to, then I will become more and more enraged.

=== Marxism ===
In the 1970s, as a still-growing intellectual, Castells centered his research and intellectual processes around the works of Karl Marx because he, “felt the need to communicate to the world of political change through its language – Marxism." Castells developed his ideas by studying the works of several Marxists, including Louis Althusser. Althusser utilized a structuralist perspective in his works, which may also be seen in some of Castells' earliest publications. For example, The Urban Question: A Marxist Approach was originally published (in French) in 1972, and is a major development in the field of urban sociology. This work emphasizes the role of social movements in the conflictive transformation of the city (cf. post-industrial society). Castells emphasizes that problems within cities do not exist in a social vacuum, and that they must be contextualized to be appropriately analyzed.

Castells also introduced the concept of "collective consumption" (public transport, public housing, etc.) comprehending a wide range of social struggles—displaced from the economic stratum to the political stratum via state intervention.

Castells no longer identifies as a Marxist. This shift in ideology occurred when he realized that the concepts he was interested in exploring could not be appropriately evaluated by Marxism. Marxism uses class as its major lens for examining social life, and Castells had become interested in ideas that could not be understood by considering class alone. By moving away from Marxism, Castells could explore the concepts of gender, urban social movements, and nationality in a more thoughtful way. He is still interested in ideas that are related to Marxism, such as social change, power relations, and technology, but has broadened his scope of how he approaches them as topics. Castells has said that he prefers to think of theory as a tool, and Marxism is simply a tool that he uses less now. He has not renounced Marx, but has chosen different tools to analyze the social world with. The following quote exemplifies the expansion of Castells' theoretical paradigm.

When I left Spain again to go to Berkeley, I was no longer interested in correct answers but in relevant questions. I became more political when I left Marxism. I left the Parisian salons with wonderful categories that had nothing to do with reality and started relying more on my own observations.

Transcending Marxist structures in the early 1980s, he concentrated upon the role of new technologies in the restructuring of an economy. In 1989, he introduced the concept of the "space of flows", the material and immaterial components of global information networks used for the real-time, long-distance co-ordination of the economy.

In the 1990s, he combined his two research strands in The Information Age: Economy, Society and Culture, published as a trilogy, The Rise of the Network Society (1996), The Power of Identity (1997), and End of Millennium (1998); two years later, its worldwide, favourable critical acceptance in university seminars, prompted publication of a second (2000) edition that is 40 per cent different from the first (1996) edition.

== Critical responses to Castells ==
Over the years, Castells' work has been met with several noteworthy critiques. Some criticisms of Castells' work compare his ideas to functionalism, in that they include some “abstract system-building.” In other words, there is a certain level of inattention to individuals, while sweeping generalizations are made about society. Additionally, Castells' work includes observations about the intense global influence of informationalism. There is some discrepancy about how much of the globe is truly “dominated” by expansive informational networks. The global population is so diverse that there are many exceptions to the idea of complete global domination. These information networks have the potential to be useful “ideal types” for studying global relations, but one should exercise caution when using them to model the real world. Castells has also been criticized for the conservatism that appears within his theories. He has noted that there is “little chance of social change” within the network society. This reveals a thought process that supports the status quo, which can be a problem for social change and justice movements. Related to this criticism, some scholars have found it peculiar that while Castells' theorizes quite a bit about global connection, he does not explore the potential of those global connections to establish an international system for the protection of human rights and cultural difference.

== Publications ==
Manuel Castells is one of the world's most often-cited social science and communications scholars. Castells is a sole author of 23 books and editor or co-editor of fifteen more, as well as over one hundred articles in academic journals. The trilogy, The Information Age, has been compared to the work of Karl Marx and Max Weber. It took him fifteen years to conduct research for the trilogy.

Books

- The Urban Question. A Marxist Approach (Alan Sheridan, translator). London, Edward Arnold (1977) (Original publication in French, 1972)
- City, Class and Power. London; New York, MacMillan; St. Martins Press (1978)
- The Economic Crisis and American Society. Princeton, NJ, Princeton UP (1980)
- The City and the Grassroots: A Cross-cultural Theory of Urban Social Movements. Berkeley: University of California Press (1983)
- The Informational City: Information Technology, Economic Restructuring, and the Urban Regional Process. Oxford, UK; Cambridge, Massachusetts: Blackwell (1989)
- Technopoles of the World : The Making of 21st Century Industrial Complexes. London, New York: Routledge (1994)
- The Information Age trilogy:
1. Castells, Manuel (1996). The Rise of the Network Society, The Information Age: Economy, Society and Culture Vol. I. Cambridge, Massachusetts; Oxford, UK: Blackwell. ISBN 978-0-631-22140-1.
2. Castells, Manuel (1997). The Power of Identity, The Information Age: Economy, Society and Culture Vol. II. Cambridge, Massachusetts; Oxford, UK: Blackwell. ISBN 978-1-4051-0713-6.
3. Castells, Manuel (1998). End of Millennium, The Information Age: Economy, Society and Culture Vol. III. Cambridge, Massachusetts; Oxford, UK: Blackwell. ISBN 978-0-631-22139-5.
- The Internet Galaxy, Reflections on the Internet, Business and Society. Oxford, Oxford University Press (2001)
- The Information Society and the Welfare State: The Finnish Model. Oxford UP, Oxford (2002) (co-author, Pekka Himanen )
- The Network Society: A Cross-Cultural Perspective. Cheltenham, UK; Northampton, MA, Edward Elgar (2004), (editor and co-author), ISBN 978-1-84542-435-0.
- The Network Society: From Knowledge to Policy. Washington, DC, Center for Transatlantic Relations (2006) (co-editor)
- Mobile Communication and Society: A Global Perspective. Cambridge, Massachusetts, MIT Press (2006) (co-author)
- Communication power. Oxford/New York, Oxford University Press (2009) ISBN 978-0-19-956704-1
- Aftermath: the cultures of the economic crisis. Oxford, UK: Oxford University Press (2012) ISBN 978-0-19-965841-1
- Networks of Outrage and Hope. Social Movements in the Internet Age. Cambridge, Massachusetts, Polity Press (2012) ISBN 978-0-74-566284-8
- Reconceptualizing Development in the Global Information Age. OXFORD University Press (2014) (co-author, Pekka Himanen ) ISBN 978-0-19-871608-2
- Rupture: the crisis of liberal democracy. Cambridge, UK, Polity Press (2018) ISBN 978-1-5095-3199-8

Journal αrticles

- Social Uses of Wireless Communications: The Mobile Information Society, co-author of the paper for the International Workshop on Wireless Communication Policies and Prospects: A Global Perspective, USC, 8–9 October 2004.
- Castells, M (2007) Communication, power and counter-power in the network society. International Journal of Communication 1(1): 238–66.
- Arsenault, A, and Castells, M. 2008. The structure and dynamics of global multimedia business networks. International Journal of Communication 2707–48.
- Arsenault, A & Castells, M. (2008) Switching power: Rupert Murdoch and the global business of media politics: A sociological analysis. International Sociology 23(4): 488.
