= Arturo Torró =

Spanish politician (1963–2025)

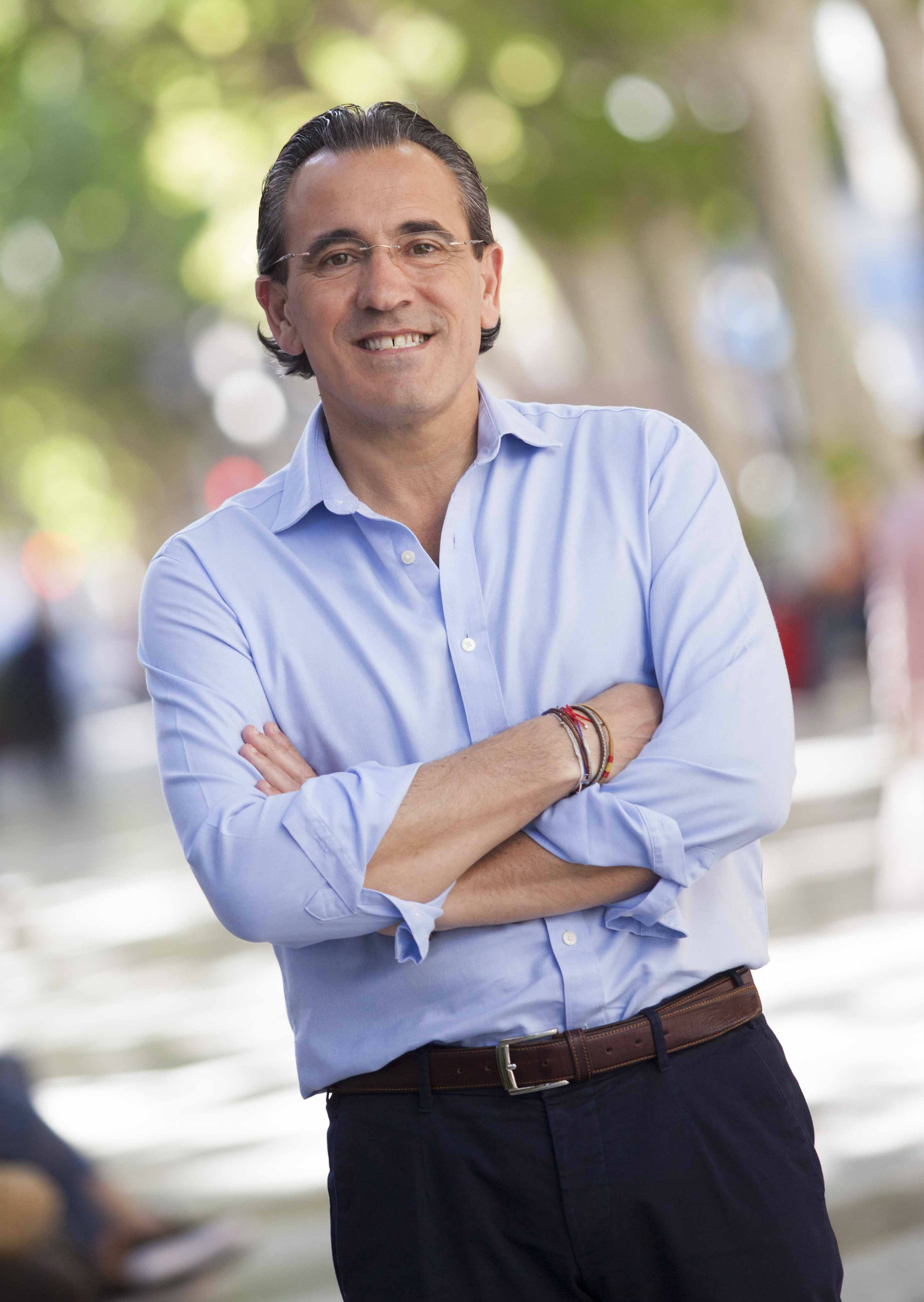
- Torró in 2015

Mayor of Gandía
- In office 11 June 2011 – 13 June 2015
- Preceded by: Jose Manuel Orengo
- Succeeded by: Diana Morant

Spokesperson of the Popular Municipal Group In the Gandía City Council
- In office 16 June 2007 – 11 June 2011

Councillor of the Gandía City Council
- In office 16 June 2007 – 28 January 2016 4 July 1999 – 14 June 2003

Personal details
- Born: Arturo Torró Chisvert; 12 January 1963; L'Alcúdia, Spain
- Died: 19 February 2025 (aged 62); Jeresa, Spain
- Cause of death: Gunshot wound
- Political party: PP
- Children: 2
- Parents: Vicente Arturo Torró (father); Teresa Torró (mother)
- Occupation: Politician; Businessman

Arturo Torró Chisvert (12 January 1963 – 19 February 2025) was a Spanish politician and businessman, who served as Mayor of Gandia from 2011 to 2015, and was President of the PP in the town between 2010 and 2016. He was also President of the Gandia Comercial Centro Histórico Cooperative from 1997 to 2007.

On 19 February 2025, Torró was found dead with a gunshot wound to the chest and strangulation marks. He was 62 years old. According to the National Police, the suspect was taken into custody and charged with Torró's assassination.
