= Evaluation and Quality Agency =

- Agencia Estatal de Evaluación de las Políticas Públicas y la Calidad de los Servicios

Agency overview
- Formed: January 1, 2007
- Dissolved: July 28, 2017
- Superseding agency: Institute for the Evaluation of Public Policies
- Jurisdiction: Spain
- Headquarters: Madrid, Spain
- Annual budget: € 9.93 million (2016)
- Parent agency: Ministry of the Treasury and Public Function
- Website: www.aeval.es

The State Agency for the Evaluation of Public Policies and Quality of Services (AEVAL), commonly known as The Evaluation and Quality Agency, was a Spanish public agency responsible for the promotion, performance evaluation, and impact analysis of public policies and programs. The agency handled service quality management, promoted the rational use of resources, and ensured accountability to the public.

The agency was dissolved by Royal Decree 769/2017 on 28 July 2017. The tasks of the AEVAL have been taken over by the Secretary of State for Public Administration, which was created in 2016.

== Objectives ==
The agency had the following objectives:

- To promote the culture of evaluation and attainment of high quality service and practice in public management.
- To propose defined methodologies, and to carry out accreditation and certification of activities, by promoting the implementation of efficient information systems and indicators for evaluation and quality management.
- To conduct overall evaluation and analysis of public policies and programs.
- To foster the improvement in the quality of public services for the benefit of all citizens.
- To analyze the activities deployed by state agencies and reaffirm their commitment to improving the quality of services provided to all citizens.
- To provide efficient, high-quality services within a framework where management responsibilities are balanced with autonomy and flexibility.

In order to reach these objectives, the agency had the following competencies and functions:

- Research, prepare, and submit detailed reports to the Congress of Deputies provided for in Section 3 of the First Additional Provision of the Law on State Agencies and, in particular, to monitor the actions included in the quality management plan of such agencies.
- Provide any reports that may be required by the government, and which may also be issued as requested to regional government bodies or other institutions.
- Promote and develop analytical, training, and advisory activities aimed at improving the quality of public management and, in particular, those assigned by Royal Decree 951/2005 of 29 July establishing the general framework for quality improvement in the General State Administration.
- Prepare, in collaboration with the units that are responsible for its implementation, the proposal of the Council of Ministers of the programs and public policies managed by the General State Administration and the evaluations which are included in the Work Plan foreseen in section 2 of The first Additional Provision of the Law of State Agencies, as well as, when necessary, implement modifications to it.
- Carry out reports on the evaluation of public programs, along with their results, impact, and utilization; as well as the analysis or the evaluation of the regulatory or normative impact that are foreseen in the corresponding regulation, without prejudice to the attributions attributed to other organs by the legislature.
- Carry out the evaluations included in the Agency's Work Plan for the direct execution of correspondence.
- Monitor the evaluations included in the Agency Work Plan that direct execution correspondence to other units.
- Carry out evaluations requested by other administrations and institutions, included in the annual plan of action approved by the Governing Council.
- Propose the implementation of indicators and promote the development of information systems that facilitate the evaluation of public policies and programs.
- Develop, promote, adapt and disseminate guidelines, protocols of methodological action, management and excellence models, self-assessment guides and methodological guides for the analysis of regulation and regulatory impact, within the scope of their competencies.
- Issue credentials and certifications based on quality and excellence, and on the best practices of public administration when voluntary applications for training individuals or organizations are made.
- Participate in the development of white papers; reports and strategic plans linked to essential or broad impact public policies.
- Inform the proposals of the contracts of management of the state agencies, regarding the plan of management of the quality of the service.
- Under the terms of its powers, carry out the consulting and technical assistance work agreed upon and included in the annual action plan approved by the Governing Council.
- Promote research, training, the dissemination of experiences and to conduct studies and publications within the scope of its competencies.
- Represent, by itself and in coordination with other organs of the administrative bodies, the Spanish Administration in national and international meetings, forums and institutions related to the subjects and functions of the competition. Furthermore, coordinate international affairs that correspond with the Ministry of Foreign Affairs and Cooperation.

== Structure ==
The agency was structured in the form of governance bodies and organic structures.
Governance bodies:

- President of the Agency
- Governing Council

Organic structures:

- Department of Planning and Institutional Relations
- Department of Management
- Department of Evaluation
- Department of Quality of Services

== See also ==
- National Agency for Quality Assessment and Accreditation
