= Neuromancer (disambiguation) =

Neuromancer is a 1984 novel by William Gibson.

Neuromancer may also refer to:

- Neuromancer (video game), a 1988 video game loosely based on the novel
- Neuromancer (TV series), an American television series based on the novel
- The Neuromancer, a 2014 album by William Control
- "Neuromancer", a song by Billy Idol from the 1993 album Cyberpunk

== See also ==
- Neuromance, a 2005 album by Dope Stars Inc.
- Neuromantic (disambiguation)
