= The Internet Galaxy =

2001 book by Manuel Castells

The Internet Galaxy: Reflections on the Internet, Business, and Society
- First edition
- Author: Manuel Castells
- Language: English
- Publisher: Oxford University Press
- Publication date: 2001
- Media type: Print
- ISBN: 0-19-925577-6 (pbk)
- OCLC: 59501035

The Internet Galaxy: Reflections on the Internet, Business, and Society is a book by Manuel Castells, Professor of Sociology and Professor of City and Regional Planning at the University of California. It was published by Oxford University Press in 2001. The title is a reference to The Gutenberg Galaxy, a 1962 book by Marshall McLuhan. It is regarded as a good introduction to Social informatics.

== Overview ==
The book contains 9 chapters. Castells starts with the history of Internet, focuses on the process of Internet evolution influence our society. He emphasizes the development of Internet from 1962 to 1995, the extension from ARPANET to WWW.

Castells believes that "The openness of the Internet's architecture was the source of its main strength". Then he states that the 'Internet Culture' is structured by four kinds of culture including: 'the techno-meritocratic culture', 'the hacker culture', 'the virtual communication culture', and 'the entrepreneurial culture'.

Next, Castells analyses the vital status of Internet in the business and economy fields, and he refers to the impact of virtual communication which is based on the Internet communication to the reality in the following chapter. In terms of the Politics of the Internet, Castells points that 'social movement' and 'the political process' use Internet as a new communication medium to 'acting' and 'informing'. And there is an issue between 'Privacy and Liberty in Cyberspace' relates to 'the politics of the Internet' is mentioned in this book.

In the last three chapters, Castells analyses the Internet from multimedia, geography and 'the digital divide in a global perspective'. Finally, he talks about the challenges of the network society such as freedom of the Internet.

== Opening: The Network is the Message ==
The title used for the preface or introductory text is called "Opening" and the name given to this Opening is "The Network is the Message". It is a mimicry of Marshall McLuhan's famous slogan "The medium is the message". By substituting network for medium, Castells reinforces McLuhan's message that, in this case, it is the network which is important not the content. The opening may then be seen to be an invitation to explore the meaning of network via the content of the book. The word network itself is of ambiguous interpretation: infrastructure or society? Both interpretations are at play in the book. Since Castells is by profession a sociologist, then one expects a focus on network as society.

== Lessons from the History of the Internet ==
Castells introduces the label ″Libertarian″ to characterize all those who participated with "big science" and "military research" in bringing the Internet into being. The history of the Internet is diverse and well documented. Castells makes considerable use of John Naughton's text, "A Brief History of the Future", who noted for example that the Request for Comment Feature (RFC), introduced by Steve Crocker in 1969-04-07, not only gave rise to a de facto documenting of the research ideas at the time of their fermenting but also to the Open Source movement. Castells gives his own take on the subject. Ultimately, for him, the Internet is a cultural creation.

== The Culture of the Internet ==
"The culture of the Internet is a culture made up of a technocratic belief in the progress of humans through technology, enacted by communities of hackers thriving on free and open technological creativity, embedded in virtual networks aimed at reinventing society, and materialized by money-driven entrepreneurs into the workings of the new economy."

It is important to take note of how Castells understands and uses the word Network. For him, the network is a word that often has connotations of community. So, when he speaks of virtual networks he is not (necessarily) speaking of virtual networks in the technological sense but in the community sense of people networking.

== e-Business and the New Economy ==
"But markets also react to macro-economic conditions, and to policy decisions—or to their anticipation. Or to the disparity between the anticipation and the actual event. Markets react as well on the basis of non-economic criteria. These are influenced by what I call informationTurbulences from various sources, such as political uncertainty... technological anticipations... or even personal moods or statements from key decision-makers..."

== Virtual Communities or Network Society? ==
"In contrast with the notorious cartoon published by The New Yorker in the pre-history of on-line communication, on the Internet you better make sure that everyone knows that you are a dog, and not a cat, or you will find yourself immersed in the intimate world of cats. Because on the Internet, you are what you say you are, as it is on the basis of this expectation that a network of social interaction is constructed over time."

== The Politics of the Internet I: Computer Networks, Civil Society, and the State ==
"In this context [of a world dominated by homogeneous, global information flows], communication of values, mobilization around meaning, become fundamental. Cultural movements... are built around communication—essentially the Internet and the media... to affect the consciousness of society as a whole."

=== Networked Social Movements ===
Castells shows how the Internet has been used for mobilizing people to support certain kinds of political, religious, or other social causes:

- the Zapatista movement in Chiapas, Mexico
- the Falun Gong movement, leader Li Hongzhi in New York
- the Direct Action Network in Seattle

== The Politics of the Internet II: Privacy and Liberty in Cyberspace ==
"Unless governments stop fearing their people, and therefore the Internet, society will resort once again to the barricades to defend freedom and this will mark a stunning historical continuity."

This is that chapter of the book which one must read in the context of the pre-9/11 world.

=== The End of Privacy ===
Castells mentions a few official programs of governments:

- the Echelon program of the US/UK
- the FBI Carnivore program
- Singel, Ryan (August 29, 2007). "Point, Click ... Eavesdrop: How the FBI Wiretap Net Operates". Wired.

== Multimedia and the Internet: The Hypertext beyond Convergence ==
"Human culture only exists in and by human minds, usually connected to human bodies. Therefore, if our minds have the material capability to access the whole realm of cultural expressions—select them, recombine them—we do have a hypertext: the hypertext is inside us."

== The Geography of the Internet: Networked Places ==
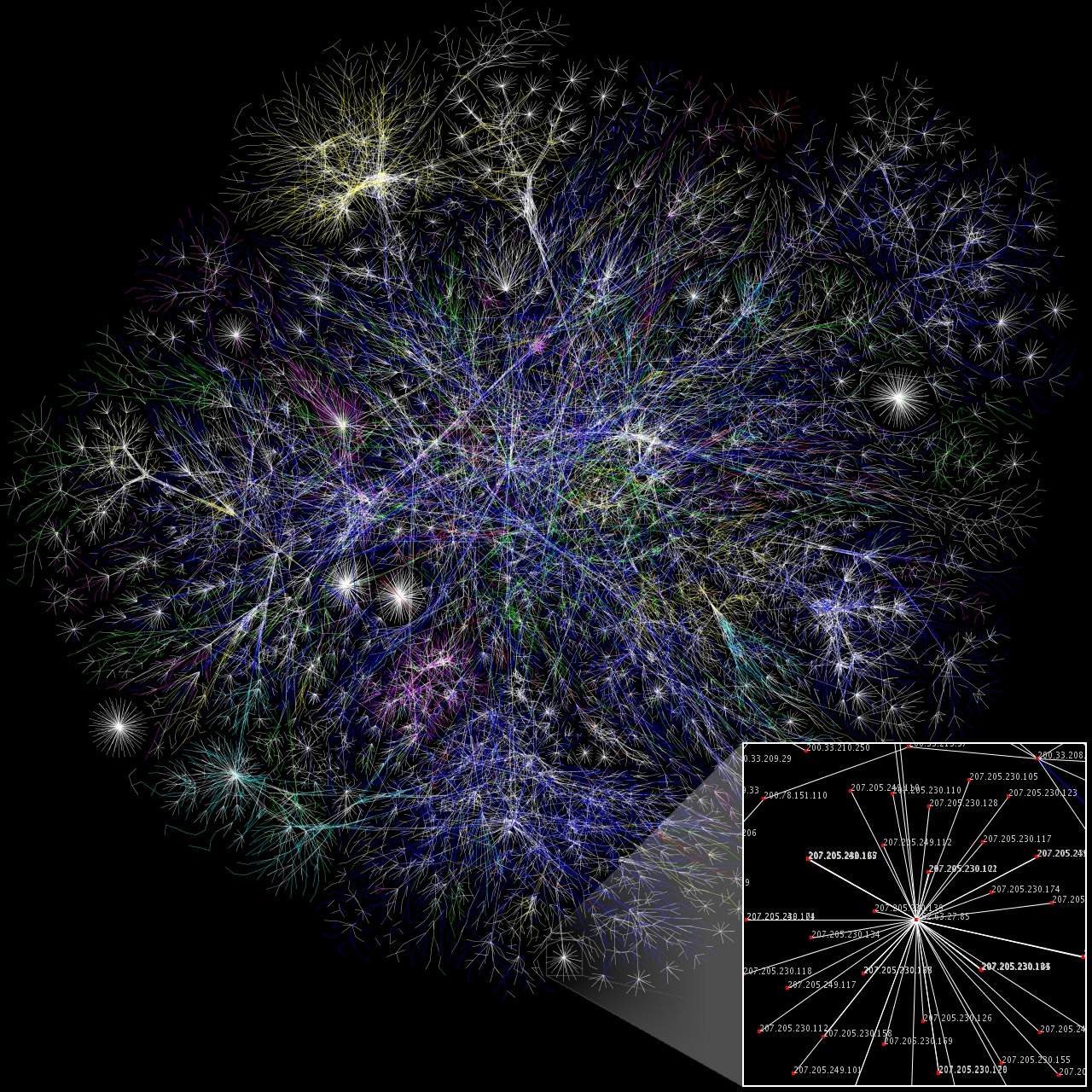
Internet map by Matt Britt

"Cities are faced with a challenge... It follows that public space and monumentality (museums, cultural centers, public art, architectural icons) will play a key role in marking space, and facilitating meaningful interaction."

There are different ways in which to picture the geography of the Internet. The picture of the graph on the cover of the book resembles that of Matt Britt shown on the right.

== The Digital Divide in a Global Perspective ==
"Education, information, science, and technology become the critical sources of value creation in the Internet-based economy. Educational, informational, and technological resources are characterized by extremely uneven distribution throughout the world (UNESCO, 1999)."

== Conclusion: The Challenges of the Network Society ==
"I imagine one could say: ″Why don't you leave me alone?! I want no part of your Internet, of your technological civilization, of your network society! I just want to live my life!″..."

== e-Links ==
One of the significant features of the book (published in 2001 before the September 11 attacks and around the time of the dot-com bubble) is the inclusion of the e-Links section at the end of every chapter. Each e-Link is given as a URL, followed by a short text of one or two lines to describe the content. For example, at the end of Chapter 6 "The Politics of the Internet II: Privacy and Liberty in Cyberspace", a collection of 4 e-Links is given:

- cnetdownload.com
- junkbusters.com
- silentsurf.com
- anonymizer.com

and the short explanatory text following is "Websites providing technological resources to protect privacy."

There is one major flaw associated with the e-Links. None of the e-Links in The Internet Galaxy provide "the date of last access".

== External references ==
1. StudyPlace wiki (date of last access: 2008-09-11)
2. David Birch, Second Sight, The Guardian, Thursday November 4, 2004; (date of last access: 2008-09-15)
3. Heritage Minute account of enactment of the discovery of The Medium is the Message (date of last access: 2008-09-16)
4. Martin Weller, The Network is the Message, the Open University, 2005-12-15. (date of last access: 2008-09-16)
5. Hal Burch and Bill Cheswick. Software developers of the Internet map used as book cover illustration. Internet Mapping Project Archived 2012-02-24 at the Wayback Machine (date of last access: 2008-09-16)
6. Rob Kling, Review of The Internet Galaxy, Academe Online Archived 2010-04-14 at the Wayback Machine July–August 2002. (date of last access: 2008-09-23).
7. Naughton, John (2000), A brief history of the future, London: Phoenix, ISBN 0-7538-1093-X, OCLC 44154042, OCLC 59577773
8. IETF Request for Comments (RFC). (date of last access: 2008-09-23)
