= The Information Age: Economy, Society and Culture =

Trilogy of books by Manuel Castells

The Information Age: Economy, Society and Culture is a trilogy of books by sociologist Manuel Castells: The Rise of the Network Society (1996), The Power of Identity (1997), and End of Millennium (1998). The second edition was heavily revised; volume one is 40 percent different from the first edition.

== Summary ==
The Information Age is an account of the role of information in contemporary society. Manuel Castells describes the shift from an industrial society to an informational society, which started in the 1970s. This Network Society is structured around networks instead of individual actors, and works through a constant flow of information through technology. Castells emphasises the interrelationship of social, economic and political features of society, and argues that the 'network' is the defining feature that marks our current epoch.

== The Rise of the Network Society ==
In this volume Castells analyses the structural changes to the global economy that took place from the 1970s to 1990s. He describes the 'new economy', which he claims is based on 'a new mode of development, informationalism, of which networking is a critical attribute'. In this new 'Informational Economy' a firm's competitiveness is dependent on its knowledge of technology, information, and access to networks. The new economy is defined by a 'transformation of work and employment'. This concept implies that there is higher unemployment in countries where technology is scarce. The uneven development of new technology leads to 'social polarization and social exclusion'. This concept describes an increase in equality across nations due to globalization and an uneven distribution of technology, and thus networking opportunities and lower competitiveness.

This transition to an informational mode of development is enabled by the growth of information technology and changes in organizational structure based on networks. Castells examines statistical evidence of changes in work structure and labour patterns, and concludes that while the networked 'symbolic analyst' (or knowledge worker) may seek work globally, we cannot say that there is a true global labour force since the majority of workers are still geographically confined and immobile. Informationalism has not led to mass joblessness, but it has led to a structural change in the work force, that of instability: in highly developed countries, a majority of workers no longer have a traditional work pattern, but part-time and temporary employment has become the norm.

Castells then discusses new media and communication technologies based around networks, arguing that they are contributing to a fundamental change in culture. The new development is a 'culture of real virtuality', which describes a culture that is organized around electronic media. He says that 'the space of flows and timeless time are the material foundations of a new culture', that of the network society. The concept of 'timeless time' refers to the collapsing of time in global informational networks, for example automated financial transactions.

== See also ==
- Network society
- Space of flows
- Information Age
