= Time–space compression =

Idea in space–time

Time–space compression (also known as space–time compression and time–space distanciation) is a Marxist concept describing the altering of the qualities of space–time and the narrowing of the relationship between space and time that is a consequence of the expansion of capital. It is rooted in Karl Marx's notion of the "annihilation of space by time" originally elaborated in the Grundrisse, and was later articulated by Marxist geographer David Harvey in his book The Condition of Postmodernity. A similar idea was proposed by Elmar Altvater in an article in PROKLA in 1987, translated into English as "Ecological and Economic Modalities of Time and Space" and published in Capitalism Nature Socialism in 1990.

Time–space compression occurs as a result of technological innovations driven by the global expansion of capital that condense or elide spatial and temporal distances, including technologies of communication (telegraph, telephones, fax machines, Internet) and travel (rail, cars, trains, jets), driven by the need to overcome spatial barriers, open up new markets, speed up production cycles, and reduce the turnover time of capital.

== Overview ==
According to Paul Virilio, time-space compression is an essential facet of capitalist life, saying that "we are entering a space which is speed-space ... This new other time is that of electronic transmission, of high-tech machines, and therefore, man is present in this sort of time, not via his physical presence, but via programming" (qtd. in Decron 71). In Speed and Politics, Virilio coined the term dromology to describe the study of "speed-space". Virilio describes velocity as the hidden factor in wealth and power, where historical eras and political events are effectively speed-ratios. In his view, acceleration destroys space and compresses time in ways of perceiving reality.

Theorists generally identify two historical periods in which time–space compression occurred; the period from the mid-19th century to the beginnings of the First World War, and the end of the 20th century. Summarizing a consensus view, Jon May and Nigel Thrift write that many agree that "there occurred a radical restructuring in the nature and experience of both time and space ... both periods saw a significant acceleration in the pace of life concomitant with a dissolution or collapse of traditional spatial co-ordinates".

== Criticism ==
Doreen Massey critiqued the idea of time-space compression in her discussion of globalization and its effect on our society. She insisted that any ideas that our world is "speeding up" and "spreading out" should be placed within local social contexts. "Time-space compression", she argues, "needs differentiating socially": "how people are placed within 'time-space compression' are complicated and extremely varied". In effect, Massey is critical of the notion of "time-space compression" as it represents capital's attempts to erase the sense of the local and masks the dynamic social ways through which places remain "meeting places".

For Moishe Postone, Harvey's treatment of space-time compression and postmodern diversity are merely reactions to capitalism. Hence Harvey's analysis remains "extrinsic to the social forms expressed" by the deep structure concepts of capital, value and the commodity. For Postone, the postmodern moment is not necessarily just a one-sided effect of the contemporary form of capitalism but can also be seen as having an emancipatory side if it happened to be part of post-capitalism. And because postmodernism usually neglects its own context of embeddedness it can legitimate capitalism as postmodern, whereas at the level of deep structure it may in fact be more concentrated, with large capitals that accumulate rather than diverge, and with an expansion of commodification niches with fewer buyers.

Postone asserts that one cannot step outside capitalism and declare it a pure evil or as a one-dimensional badness, since the emancipatory content of such things as equal distribution or diversity are potentials of capitalism itself in its abundant and diverse productive powers. This initial perspective misfires however, when forms of society such as modernity and subsequently postmodernism take itself as the true whole of life for being oppositional to capitalism, when in fact they are grounded in the reproduction of the same capitalist relations that created them.

== See also ==
- Global village
- Late capitalism
- Late modernism
- Late modernity
- Social production of space
- Space of flows
- Social acceleration – Sociological concept
