= Pilar Paneque =

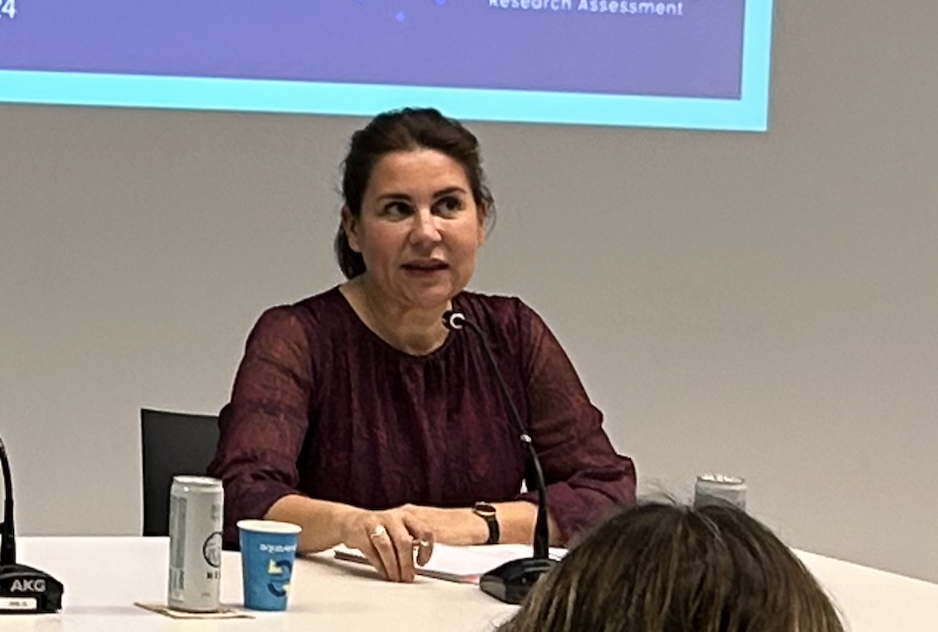
- Pilar Paneque at UOC in 2024
- Born: 1974 (age 50–51); Seville
- Occupation: Scientist
- Known for: Executive Director of National Agency for Quality Assessment and Accreditation (2023-)

Pilar Paneque Salgado (Seville, 1974) is a Spanish researcher, director of the Spanish National Agency for Quality Evaluation and Accreditation (ANECA) since February 2023.

== Biography ==
Paneque graduated in geography and history from the University of Seville in 1997. She continued her studies at the University of Pennsylvania, completing a master's degree in demography and sociology. In 2003 she became a doctor in Geography from the Pablo de Olavide University, where she later served as a professor.

After obtaining her Ph.D. she completed stays at universities such as Harvard-RCC, the University of Nebraska and the University of South Carolina.

She has specialized in studying the politics and management of water and territory, and has carried out research projects at the University of Utrecht, the University of Pennsylvania and the University of Oxford.

Since 2005, she has led several research projects on water risks and drought areas, as well as social vulnerability linked to climate change. Her research work has been mentioned in the IPCC's influential climate change reports.

In the field of university management, she has served as director of Postgraduate Studies, vice-rector of Planning and Quality and director of the board of trustees at the International University of Andalusia (UNIA), and has coordinated inter-university projects with the Spanish National Research Council. She has also participated in various university evaluation and sustainability initiatives.

She has been scientific coordinator at the State Research Agency of Spain, managing several projects and calls. She has been a member of the board of the Spanish Geography Association (2017-2021) and board member of the Nueva Cultura del Agua Foundation (2010-2013), in addition to being part of various associations and groups that promote the role of woman in science.

In 2023, she was appointed director of ANECA, from where she proposes to promote a new university evaluation framework, approaching the European context and the principles of open science.
