= Ministry of Universities =

Government ministry of Spain

- Ministerio de Universidades

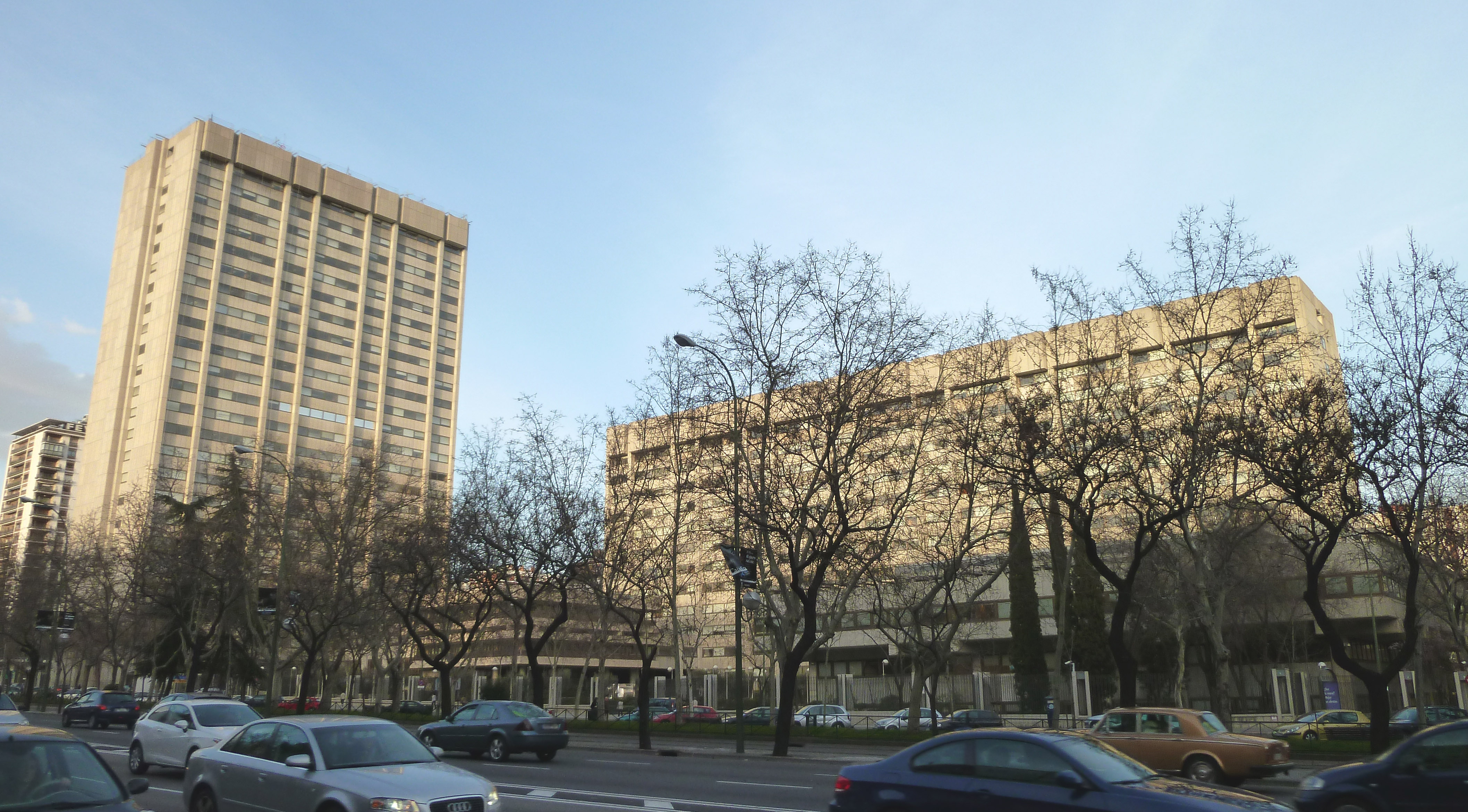
- Headquarters of the Ministry

Agency overview
- Formed: 12 January 2020
- Preceding agency: Ministry of Science, Innovation and Universities
- Dissolved: 20 November 2023
- Superseding agency: Ministry of Science, Innovation and Universities
- Type: Ministry
- Jurisdiction: Government of Spain
- Annual budget: € 475 million, 2023
- Minister responsible: Joan Subirats, Minister

The Ministry of Universities was a ministerial department in the Government of Spain responsible for proposing and carrying out the government policy on universities as well as representing Spain in the European Union and other international organizations regarding universities.

The department was created as part of the Sánchez II Government as a split from the Ministry of Science, Innovation and Universities. On 20 November 2023 the department was disestablished and its functions returned to the Ministry of Science after years of insistence by the scientific and university community.

The ministry had two ministers: Manuel Castells (2020–2021) and Joan Subirats (2021–2023).

== Organization chart ==
The Department of Universities was structured in the following bodies:

- The General Secretariat for Universities
  - The Technical Cabinet
  - The Deputy Directorate-General for University Professors Training and Programming
  - The Deputy Directorate-General for Degrees and Planning, Monitoring and Management of University Education
  - The Deputy Directorate-General for Student Services and Institutional Relations
  - The Deputy Directorate-General for Research University Activity
- The Undersecretariat of Universities
  - The Technical General Secretariat
    - The Deputy Technical General Secretariat
    - The Deputy Directorate-General for Appeals and Relations with the Courts of Justice
  - The Technical Cabinet
  - The Deputy Directorate-General for Economic Management, Budget Office and General Affairs
  - The Deputy Directorate-General for Personnel and Inspection of Services
  - The Information and Communication Technologies Division

=== Ministry agencies ===
- The University Council.
- The University Policy General Conference.
- The State University Student Council.
- The College of Spain in Paris.
- The Menéndez Pelayo International University.
- The National University of Distance Education.
- The National Agency for Quality Assessment and Accreditation.
- The Spanish Service for the Internationalization of Education.

== List of officeholders ==
Office name:

- Ministry of Universities (2020–2023)

Portrait	Name (Birth–Death)	Term of office			Party	Government	Prime Minister (Tenure)	Ref.
Portrait	Name (Birth–Death)	Took office	Left office	Duration	Party	Government	Prime Minister (Tenure)	Ref.
	Manuel Castells (born 1942)	13 January 2020	20 December 2021	1 year, 341 days	Independent	Sánchez II	Pedro Sánchez (2018–present)	
	Joan Subirats (born 1951)	20 December 2021	21 November 2023	1 year and 336 days	CatComú	Sánchez II	Pedro Sánchez (2018–present)	
