= Spatialization =

Spatialization (or spatialisation) is the spatial forms that social activities and material things, phenomena or processes take on in geography, sociology, urban planning and cultural studies. Generally the term refers to an overall sense of social space typical of a time, place or culture.

Cognitive maps are one aspect of spatialization, which also includes everyday practice, institutionalized representations (i.e., maps, see cartography) and the imagination of possible spatial worlds (as in the visual puns of the work of the Surrealist painter, René Magritte). See also geographical space, Henri Lefebvre. The origins of the term are in Rob Shields's 1985 Introduction to a Précis of Henri Lefebvre's La Production de l'espace. where social spatialization is proposed as an English translation of Henri Lefebvre's French term "l'espace". However, Shields embues the concept with a sense of being a general, socio-cultural attribute, as in the work of Michel Foucault who makes one mention of the term but does not theorize it) rather than a spatial regime that is dialectically produced as part of a Marxist mode of production.

Social spatializations are virtual but manifestly material, in discourse and as frames through which problems are understood. Following Foucault they are cultural formations relevant at multiple scales, from gestures and bodily comportment to geopolitical relationships between States (see also Critical geopolitics). On one hand, spatializations are achieved, hegemonic regimes which place and space activities in sites and regions. But on the other hand, spatializations are continually in change as they depend on and reflect peoples' ongoing performative actualizations of these spatial orders or regimes. However they are contested and the focus of struggles over the meaning of places, or manners, or over the reputation of neighbourhoods.

Spatializations are therefore both ways of fixing in place cultural values and important social meanings, but also change over time. Globalization is an example of the changing spatialization of the world. Examples might include cases where a region becomes stereotyped and idolized as part of the identity of a nation state or culture: the Canadian North (Arctic) and Canadian identity; Karelia and Finnish identity.

These are often taken up in the media, for example the British North and late 20th-century British working class identity portrayed in the long-running television series Coronation Street. These place-images and regional- and place-myths take on meanings through their similarity or difference from other places people know. Spatialization is argued to be a regime of "spacings" and "placings" of people and activities. Given activities or behaviours are related to "places-for-this" and "places-for-that." Several typical spatializations can be detected: centre-margin, mosaics of different identities, binary divisions (black-white, civilized-barbarian, etc.), near-far continua (local-foreign).

Spatialization offers a way of talking about how place-images and regional- and place-myths, cognitive mappings and so on are part of wider "formations" and come to have an economic impact by being put into practice, such as through the marketing of tourism destinations, and the way that the reputations of places and regions becomes a conceptual shorthand which lends credibility to claims and beliefs, such as the truthfulness of a scientific finding (e.g., "Cambridge" - whether USA or UK), the believability of a religious claim or an event (e.g., "Mecca"), or the trustworthiness of a product (e.g., "Swiss" watches). For these reasons, the identities of places are durable and city-marketing fails, place-marketing does not work or city-branding is unsuccessful: the entire network of place-myths has to be reworked if one place-myth is to be altered relative to others.

Spatializations are important for governance by linking affect and emotion to place and region. They can be referenced in architecture and interior design, for example, in escapist consumer environments such as the West Edmonton Mall.
