= Social space =

Place where people gather and interact

A social space is physical or virtual space such as a social center, online social media, or other gathering place where people gather and interact. Some social spaces such as town squares or parks are public places; others such as pubs, websites, or shopping malls are privately owned and regulated. Émile Durkheim coined the term social space; among other writers, sociologist Henri Lefebvre developed the concept from the 1960s.

== Concept ==
Lefebvre emphasised that in human society all "space is social: it involves assigning more or less appropriated places to social relations ... social space has thus always been a social product." Social space becomes thereby a metaphor for the very experience of social life – "society experienced alternatively as a deterministic environment or force (milieu) and as our very element or beneficent shell (ambience)." In this sense "social space spans the dichotomy between 'public' and 'private' space ... is also linked to subjective and phenomenological space." Maximilien Sorre and Paul-Henry Chombart de Lauwe further developed the concept of social space.

== As metaphor ==
As metaphor, "social space contributes a relational rather than an abstract dimension ... has received a large variety of attributes, interpretations, and metaphors." Such "social space ... i[s] an intricate space of obligations, duties, entitlements, prohibitions, debts, affections, insults, allies, contracts, enemies, infatuations, compromises, mutual love, legitimate expectations, and collective ideals."

For Lefebvre, "the family, the school, the workplace, the church, and so on – each possesses an 'appropriate' space ... for a use specified within the social division of labor." Within such social spaces 'a system of "adapted" expectations and responses – rarely articulated as such because they seem obvious – acquire a quasi-natural self-evidence in everyday life and common sense": thus everybody consensually "knows what he is talking about when he refers to the town hall, the post office, the police station, the grocery store, the bus and the train, train stations, and bistros" – all underlying aspects of "a social space as such; an (artificial) edifice of hierarchically ordered institutions, of laws and conventions."

== Morphology ==
Defining a stratified morphology as a series of "discrete units embedded within one another in a definite order", one can see that a distinct "morphology exists in social space – from the 'room' or hut to the house and the building; from the building to the group of houses, to the village and the neighbourhood; from the neighbourhood to the city, the region, the nation, and the State ... continent [and] planet."

The interaction of different levels may be symbiotic or it may be conflictual: as a Michigan cabinet member put it to two Southern colleagues shortly before the American Civil War, "I see how it is; you are a Virginian and you are a South Carolinian; I am not a Michigander, I am an American".

For the individual, as well as the social institution, different levels of social space come to the fore at different times. To a Britisher, for example, "we" sometimes narrows to southern England, sometimes broadens to refer to "Britain and America" or "Europe" or "the west"'. In precisely the same way, "a resident of Rome may define himself with varying degrees of intensity as a Roman, an Italian, a Catholic, a Christian, a European, a Westerner" – a sequence of stratified social spaces.

== Premodern/postmodern space ==
'In premodern societies, space and place largely coincided ... Modernity increasingly tears space away from place'. Whereas in the premodern "everything has its assigned place in social space", postmodernists would proudly proclaim that "we need to substitute for the magisterial space of the past ... a less upright, less Euclidean space where no one would ever be in his final place."

The way "migration, seen as a metaphor, is everywhere" in postmodernity – "we are migrants and perhaps hybrids, in but not of any situation in which we find ourselves" – is rooted in the postmodern forms of production of social space.

Lefebvre considered globalization as the creation, and superimposition on nature, of "worldwide-social space ... with strong points (the centers) and weaker and dominated bases (the peripheries)."

== The insanity of place ==
Education, formal and informal, might be described as in large part a process whereby the new recruit to the human race "must learn to represent the many dimensions of the local social space ... through the veil of degraded inputs, chronic ambiguity, and the occasional deliberate deception." Faced with such intricacies, R. D. Laing concluded that "it is just as well that man is a social animal, since the sheer complexity and contradiction of the social field in which he has to live is so formidable."

The madman, by contrast, is not "someone to be counted on to know his place": in many ways, "mental symptoms are wilful situational improprieties." Whereas in "public and semi-public places —streets, shops, neighbourhoods, public transportation, and the like— ... a fine mesh of obligations obtains which ensures the orderly traffic and co-mingling of participants ... many classic symptoms of psychosis are precise and pointed violations of these territorial arrangements."

Lacan considered that "it would be worthwhile mapping the places in social space that our culture has assigned to these [psychotic] subjects", and saw their difficulties as in part "the effects of the breakdown produced by the symbolic discordances that characterize the complex structures of civilization": what Goffman termed "The Insanity of Place".

== Cultural examples ==
- In Pride and Prejudice, Darcy is initially riven with "uncertainty as to whether he can bring himself to cross the great social space which, as he sees it (he is still proud), separates Elizabeth from himself."
- In "postmodern art ... a cubist painting presents multiple perspectives simultaneously, fracturing 'space' and literally requiring any single spectator to be in several different places at once ... this postmodern crisis of subjectivity."
- "Lefebvre suggests that art may come to be defined 'less as a code of space than as a code of representational spaces'" – "the space of representations and the representation of space ... a mental space" which both reflects and interacts with social space.

== See also ==
- Contact zone
- Cultural area
- Cultural landscape
- Cultural geography
- Gemeinschaft and Gesellschaft
- Edward T. Hall
- Proxemics
- Social structure
- Social networks
- Social production of space
- Territoriality
