= National Agency for Quality Assessment and Accreditation =

Spanish educational accreditation agency

- Agencia Nacional de la Evaluación de la Calidad y Acreditación
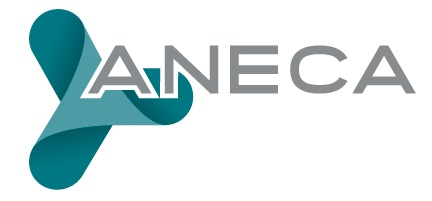

Agency overview
- Formed: July 19, 2002; 24 years ago
- Jurisdiction: Spain
- Headquarters: Madrid, Spain
- Annual budget: € 12.9 million, 2023
- Agency executive: Director-General, Pilar Paneque (2023–)
- Parent agency: Ministry of Universities
- Website: www.aneca.es

The National Agency for Quality Assessment and Accreditation (Spanish: Agencia Nacional de Evaluación de la Calidad y Acreditación, ANECA) is the authorised agency of the Spanish government whose aim is to provide external quality assurance for the Spanish higher education system and to contribute to its constant improvement through evaluation, certification and accreditation.

ANECA was created as a foundation in 2002 by the Cabinet of Spain under the Universities Organic Act, and it has the status of Autonomous agency. It is a member of the European Consortium for Accreditation in higher education (ECA).

== Mission ==
ANECA's mission is to coordinate policies for quality assurance (QA) in Spanish universities. Such policies are aimed at fitting the university to the market. Through the evaluation reports it publishes, leading to certification and accreditation, ANECA aims to measure the performance of public-sector higher education according to objective criteria and transparent processes. Its ultimate aim is that the quality of university provision should be guaranteed and publicised, securing the universities' integration into the European Higher Education Area.

== Structure ==
The ANECA foundation comprises its management (Gerencia), a Governing Council (Consejo Rector) which includes the Secretary-General for Universities, and several advisory councils (Comisiones de Asesoramiento). Its current director is Pilar Paneque, appointed in 2023. Former Directors have been Mercedes Siles Molina, appointed in February 2019, Ismael Crespo Martínez (founder, 2002–2004), Francisco Marcellán (2004–2006), Gemma Rauret (2006–2009), Zulima Fernández Rodríguez (2009–2012), Rafael van Grieken Salvador (2012–2016) and José Arnáez Vadillo (2016–2019).

The governing statutes lay down that the Director shall be appointed for a three-year term by the Governing Council on the instance of the Minister of Universities.

The structure of the agency is:

- Governing Council.
  - Director of the Agency.
    - Management.
    - Division of Programme and Institutional evaluation.
      - Advisory Committee for Programme and Institutional evaluation.
    - Division of Teaching Staff Evaluation.
      - Advisory Committee for the evaluation of teaching staff.
      - National Committee for the evaluation of researching activity.

=== Governing bodies ===
==== Governing Council ====
The governing council is the corporate governing body responsible for controlling and monitoring ANECA's activities, and for maintaining stakeholders in higher education informed of these, as provided for in the Statutes and other current legislation. The council has nine members. Participation by major stakeholders has been encouraged in higher education through representatives from different affiliated bodies: students, the Conference of the Social Bodies of Spanish Public Universities, trade unions, and the National Confederation of Business Organisations, as well as a Regional Administration representative with responsibilities in university education.

==== Director ====
The director is a unipersonal executive body tasked with the ordinary management of ANECA. The director is appointed by the Governing Council, thus further strengthening independence.

== Activities ==
ANECA carries out training, evaluation, certification, and accreditation in the following fields, using internationally applied procedures and evaluation criteria:

1. Teaching leading university degrees of official status and valid throughout the national territory.
2. The merits of applicants for teaching positions, including those under contract to the universities.
3. The teaching, research, transfer of knowledge, and management duties undertaken by the teaching and research staff of the universities and by the career research officials of the Public Research Organisations, such as are able to generate additional income.
4. University institutions and centres.
5. Development plans for degree courses, syllabuses, services, and management of higher education institutions and centres, and of those higher education centres in Spain that provide teaching according to the education systems of other countries or of Spanish university centres in other countries.
6. Foreign university degrees, applying harmonisation processes for recognition of equivalence with Spanish degrees in accordance with regulations.
7. Correspondence of current degrees with the pre-2007 qualifications framework for higher education (MECES).

== Regional agencies ==
Regional agencies with similar functions to ANECA have been set up within the autonomous communities.

- Andalusian Evaluation Agency (AGAE), in Andalusia.
- Agency for Quality and University Prospective of Aragon (ACPUA), in Aragón.
- Agency for University Quality of the Balearic Islands (AQUIB), in the Balearic Islands.
- Canarian Agency for University Quality and Educational Evaluation (ACCUEE, antes ACECAU), in the Canary Islands.
- Agency for University Quality of Castilla-La Mancha (ACUCM), in Castilla-La Mancha.
- Agency for the Quality of the University System of Castilla-León (ACSUCYL), in Castilla-León.
- Agency for the Quality of the University System of Catalonia (AQU), in Catalonia.
- Valencian Agency for Evaluation and Prospective (AVAP), in Valencia.
- Agency for the Quality of the University System of Galicia (ACSUG), in Galicia.
- Agency for Quality, Accreditation and Prospective of the Universities of Madrid (ACAP), in Madrid.
- Agency for the Quality of the Basque University System (UNIBASQ), in Basque Country.

== See also ==
- Higher education in Spain
- Evaluation and Quality Agency
