= Rhythmanalysis =

2004 essay collection by Henri Lefebvre

Rhythmanalysis: Space, Time and Everyday Life
- Author: Henri Lefebvre
- Original title: Éléments de rythmanalyse
- Translator: Stuart Elden; Gerald Moore
- Language: French
- Series: Critique of Everyday Life
- Genre: Essay collection
- Publisher: Éditions Syllepse, Continuum
- Publication date: 1992
- Publication place: France
- ISBN: 9780826472991

Rhythmanalysis: Space, Time and Everyday Life is a collection of essays by Marxist sociologist and urbanist philosopher Henri Lefebvre. The book outlines a method for analyzing the rhythms of urban spaces and the effects of those rhythms on the inhabitants of those spaces. It builds on his past work, with which he argued space is a production of social practices. Two concluding essays are co-authored by Catherine Régulier and had been previously published in the 1980's.

The book is considered to be the fourth volume in his Critique of Everyday Life. Published after his death in 1992, Rhythmanalysis is Lefebvre's last book. It was first translated into English by Stuart Elden and Gerald Moore in 2004.

== Origins of rhythmanalysis ==
The term "rhythmanalysis" was coined by Portuguese philosopher Lúcio Alberto Pinheiro dos Santos in a lost 1931 manuscript which focused on the physiological dimensions of rhythms. His ideas on rhythmanalysis are explicated in and further developed by Gaston Bachelard in his 1936 book La dialectique de la durée (The Dialectic of Duration). Lefebvre had previously considered rhythms in the second and third volume of Critique de la vie quotidienne (1961, 1981) and Le production de l'espace (1974).

Other thinkers to consider rhythms before Lefebvre include sociologists/philosophers Emile Durkheim, Roger Caillois, Marcel Mauss, Friedrich Nietzsche, Simone Weil, Gabriel Tarde, dancer Rudolf Laban, as well as architects Alexander Klein and Le Corbusier. The writer Georges Perec and semiologist Roland Barthes were considering rhythms contemporaneously to Lefebvre, though less dichotomously.

== General concept of rhythm ==
Lefebvre’s concept of rhythm concerns the repetition of a measure at a frequency. He identifies two kinds of rhythms: cyclical rhythms, which involve simple intervals of repetition, and alternating (or linear) rhythms. An example of a cyclical rhythm would be day fading into night, and night brightening into day; a linear rhythm might be the flow of information from a television set. Additionally, rhythms may be nested within each other; for example, the broadcast of the local news at set intervals throughout the day, throughout the week, is an example of a nested rhythm. In a less abstract fashion (or perhaps only abstract in a different fashion), Lefebvre asserts that rhythms exist at the intersection of place, time and the expenditure of energy.

Lefebvre posits that the human body is composed of several rhythms; in order to observe rhythms outside of the body, the rhythmanalyst must use her or his own rhythms as a reference to unify the rhythms under analysis. Properly put, the rhythm is the conjunction of the rhythmanalyst and the object of the analysis.

== The act of rhythmanalysis ==
Rhythms are only perceptible through the traditional five senses; accordingly, it is possible to conceptualize rhythms as being composed of sense triggers (smells, sights, sounds, etc.). Lefebvre cautions against this conceptualization however; he specifically notes that rhythm is not meant to refer always to its more traditional referents, musical and dance rhythm (although it could, so long as the rhythmanalysis concerned either music or dancing). He also cautions against taking the mere repetition of a movement to indicate a rhythm.

The object of rhythmanalysis is to access the obscure property of the rhythm called ‘presence.’ The sensory events through which the rhythmanalyst perceives the rhythm are called ‘simulacra,’ or simply ‘the present.’ The need for rhythmanalysis arises out of the propensity of the present to simulate presence.

== Presence ==
Lefebvre describes presence as the “facts of both nature and culture, at the same time sensible, affective and moral rather than imaginary” (author’s emphasis, trans. Elden and Moore). Rhythmanalysis stresses that presence is of an innately temporal character and can never be represented by any simulacrum of the present (people walking down a street, the sun going down), but can only be grasped through the analysis of rhythms (people walking down a street through time, the sun’s movement through time).

== Present ==
The present consists of one’s sensory perceptions. Lefebvre frequently warns of “the trap of the present” wherein the present is always trying to pass itself off as presence, the rhythmanalytical truth of a situation. “The trap of the present” relies on false representation. Lefebvre argues that the present engages in a commodification of reality when it successfully passes itself off as presence.

== Characteristics of rhythms ==
Lefebvre describes four alignments of rhythms. They are:

- Arrhythmia, conflict or dissonance between or among two or more rhythms, such as might occur (biologically) in an ill person;
- Polyrhythmia, co-existence of two or more rhythms without the conflict or dissonance that suggests arrhythmia;
- Eurhythmia, constructive interaction between or among two or more rhythms, such as occurs in healthy creatures;
- Isorhythmia, the rarest association between rhythms, implies equivalence of repetition, measure and frequency.

== Editions ==
- originally published in French as: Éléments de rythmanalyse. Paris: Éditions Syllepse, 1992.
- English translation published as: 'Elements of Rhythmanalysis' in Rhythmanalysis: Space, Time and Everyday Life, trans. Stuart Elden and Gerald Moore, London: Continuum, 2004. ISBN 9780826472991.
