= Neuromantic (philosophy) =

Term denoting a mental state

Neuromantic is a philosophical concept defined by anthropologist Bradd Shore as the cybernetic frame of mind among excited computer enthusiasts. These emerge as these individuals experience what Michael R. Heim called "the all-at-once simultaneity of totalizing presentness".

== Concept ==
The neuromantic concept is part of Shore's discourse on the embodied cognitive dimensions of the cultural transformation produced by the emergence of word processing, which he maintained has overcome the spatial limitations of the written text since "text modules can be combined, reconfigured, reduced, expanded, appended, or deleted from other units at the touch of a finger."

Shore cited that the neuromantic phenomenon was a vision of Martin Heidegger as it elicits passion that is also identified as an impulse unique to the modern world. Shore explains that "the sense of mastery over language resources that word processing bestows on the experienced user is intimately related to Heidegger's notion of enframing (Bestellen), a subjection of the world to human will that Heidegger saw as a characteristic of all modern technology."

There are sources that claim the concept of neuromantic is not only confined to computer enthusiasts. For instance, there is the so-called neuromantic imagination that inspire architects. Here, the cybernetic frame of mind is fired by the concept of the "third nature," which is occupied by those who inhabit not the actual terrain in which we live, work, and play but the virtual space of media flows that enter the "unconscious". According to Rowan Wilken, neuromantic architecture favors virtuality in techno-spatial and philosophical senses as well as a lack of engagement with actual reality and the questions about place and community.
