= Space of flows =

The space of flows is a high-level cultural abstraction of space and time, and their dynamic interactions with digital age society. The concept was created by the sociologist and cybernetic culture theoretician Manuel Castells to "reconceptualize new forms of spatial arrangements under the new technological paradigm"; a new type of space that allows distant synchronous, real-time interaction. The space of flows first was mentioned in The Informational City: Information Technology, Economic Restructuring, and the Urban Regional Process (1989).

== Definitions ==
Castells defines the concepts as follows: "The material arrangements that allow for simultaneity of social practices without territorial contiguity. It is not purely electronic space...It is made up first of all of a technological infrastructure of information systems, telecommunications, and transportation lines".

== Theoretic ==
Traditionally, the concept of space is considered a passive entity, while time is considered a separate and active entity. Space should not be disconnected from time, because space is a dynamic entity related to time. Castells rejected the contention that space will disappear upon the creation of the global city, because space is "the material support of time-sharing social practices". Thus, the space of flows is "the material organization of time-sharing social practices that work through flows".

In 2001, Castells wrote: "the space of flows ... links up distant locales around shared functions and meanings on the basis of electronic circuits and fast transportation corridors, while isolating and subduing the logic of experience embodied in the space of places".

== Practical ==
Space is the physical support of the way people live in time. Real world time, the space-and-time to which people are accustomed, is the "space of places", which is unlike the "space of flows" because it lacks the three elements of (i) a proper flow medium, (ii) the proper items composing the flow traversing through it, and (iii) the organisational nodes through which these flows circulate. The space of flows concept comprehends human action and interaction occurring dynamically and at a distance—effected via telecommunications technology containing continuous flows of time-sensitive communications, and the nodes of global computer systems. These informational flows connect people to a continuous, real-time cybernetic community that differs from the global village because the groups' positions in time become more important than their places.

== See also ==
- Late capitalism
- Late modernity
- Social production of space
- Time–space compression
