= Joan Subirats =

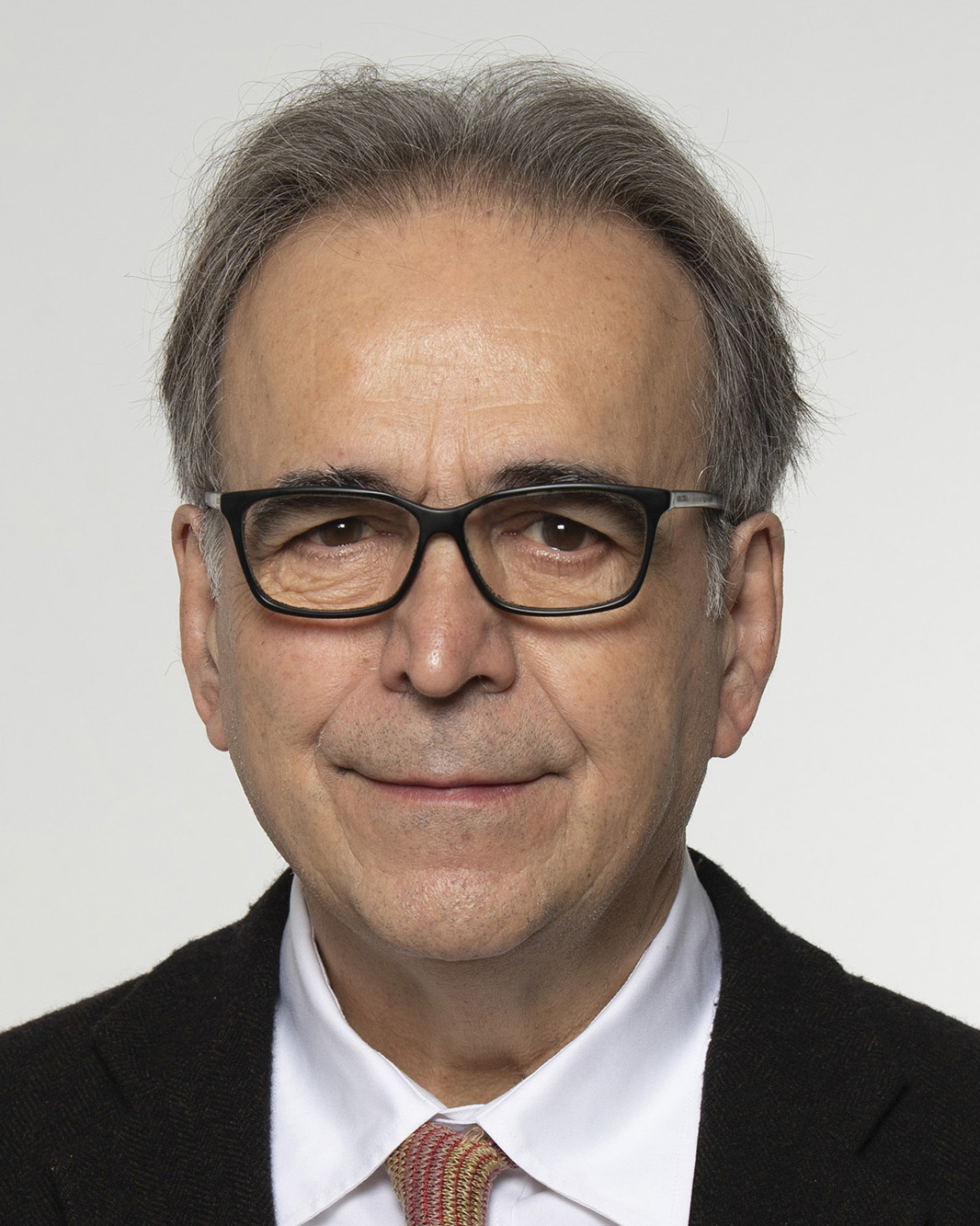
Joan Subirats (2021)

Joan Subirats Humet (born 1951) is a Spanish political scientist and professor at the Autonomous University of Barcelona, who served as minister of Universities of Spain from 2021 to 2023.

He is a specialist in governance, public management and the analysis of public policy, and has also worked on social exclusion, democratic innovation and civil society. He was founding director of the Institute of Government and Public Policy (IGOP). He frequently writes for Spanish media, such as El País, Público, Eldiario.es and the Cadena SER. He was PhD advisor of researcher Mayo Fuster Morell. He was co-founder and spokesperson of the citizen platform Barcelona En Comú, currently governing the Barcelona municipality.
