= Henri Lefebvre =

French philosopher and sociologist (1901–1991)

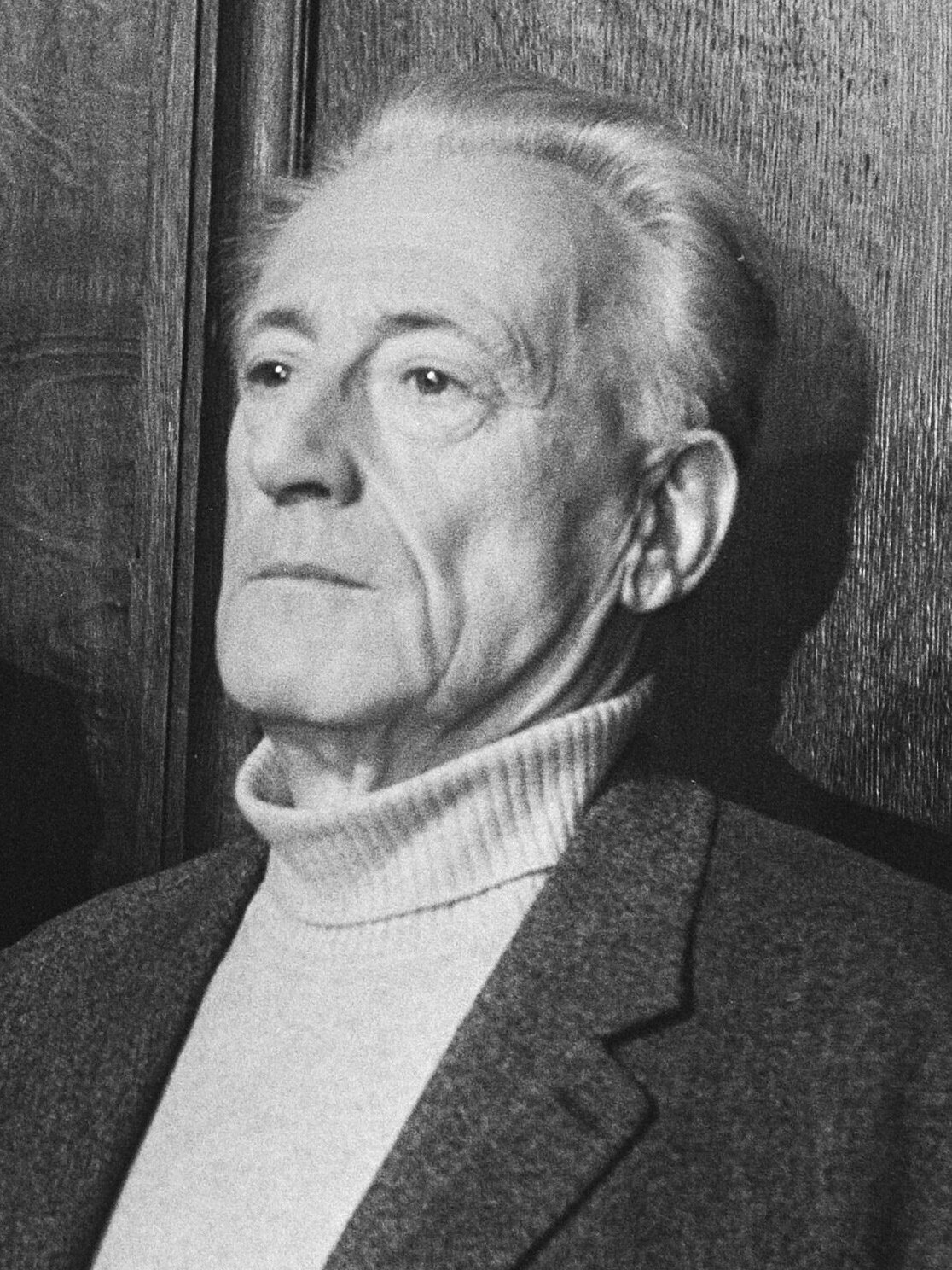
- Lefebvre in 1971
- Born: 16 June 1901; Hagetmau, Landes, France
- Died: 29 June 1991 (aged 90); Navarrenx, Pyrénées-Atlantiques, France
- Political party: PCF (1928–1958)
- Spouses: Henriette Valet (m. 1936; div. 1980) Catherine Régulier (m. 1981)

Education
- Education: University of Paris (MA, 1920; DrE, 1954)
- Thesis: Les Communautés paysannes pyrénéennes (origine, développement, déclin). Étude de sociologie historique Une République pastorale : la vallée de Campan : Organisation, vie et histoire d'une communauté pyrénéenne (1954)
- Doctoral advisor: Georges Davy
- Other advisor: André Cholley

Philosophical work
- Era: 20th-century philosophy
- Region: Western philosophy
- School: Continental philosophy Western Marxism; Hegelian Marxism
- Institutions: University of Strasbourg; University of Paris X: Nanterre
- Doctoral students: Jean Baudrillard; Anne Querrien
- Notable students: Guy Debord
- Main interests: Everyday life; dialectics; alienation; mystification; urbanity; rurality; modernity; literature; history
- Notable ideas: Critique of everyday life; theory of moments; rhythmanalysis; right to the city; social production of space; social space; New Babylon

Henri Lefebvre (/ləˈfɛvrə/ lə-FEV-rə; French: [ɑ̃ʁi ləfɛvʁ]; 16 June 1901 – 29 June 1991) was a French Marxist philosopher and sociologist, best known for furthering the critique of everyday life, for introducing the concepts of the right to the city and the social production of space, and for his work on dialectical materialism, alienation, and criticism of Stalinism, existentialism, and structuralism. In his prolific career, Lefebvre wrote more than sixty books and three hundred articles. He founded or took part in the founding of several intellectual and academic journals such as Philosophies, La Revue Marxiste, Arguments, and Espaces et Sociétés.

== Biography ==
Lefebvre was born in Hagetmau, Landes, France. He studied philosophy at the Aix-Marseille University and the University of Paris (the Sorbonne), graduating with a diplôme d'études supérieures (roughly equivalent to an MA) in 1920. By 1924 he was working with Paul Nizan, Norbert Guterman, Georges Friedmann, Georges Politzer, and Pierre Morhange in the Philosophies group seeking a "philosophical revolution". This brought them into contact with the Surrealists, Dadaists, and other groups, before they moved towards the French Communist Party (PCF). During the 1920s, Lefebvre worked various jobs including as a taxi driver, before he secured a teaching appointment at the lycée in Privas in 1929, moving on to Montargis in 1932 and to Saint-Étienne in 1940.

Lefebvre joined the PCF in 1928 and became one of the most prominent French Marxist intellectuals during the second quarter of the 20th century, before joining the French resistance. He wrote a series of works on the history of ideas and sought to establish Karl Marx as a philosopher figure; it was through his introductory texts that Louis Althusser and Albert Camus first encountered Marx. Among his works was a highly influential, anti-Stalinist text on dialectics titled Dialectical Materialism (1940). Under the Vichy regime, he had his teacher's licence revoked by Jérôme Carcopino's Ministry of Education on 11 March 1941 on account of his political views and PCF membership, and worked with Georges-Henri Rivière on ethnographic projects concerning rural crafts for the Musée national des Arts et Traditions Populaires in the Pyrenees until 1946. From September 1945 to 1949, he was the director of Radiodiffusion Française, a French radio broadcaster in Toulouse, and from 1947 he taught at a high school in the same city. In 1947, he published the first volume of his major work The Critique of Everyday Life.

Aiming for an academic career to secure time for his writing, Lefebvre considered Maurice Halbwachs as a potential thesis advisor in the first post-war years, then failed to persuade the Toulouse University geographer Daniel Faucher to accept a sociological thesis proposal on the Campan valley in 1946. In April 1948, he unsuccessfully applied for the post vacated by the sociologist Georges Gurvitch at the University of Strasbourg. By 1948, he began doctoral research at the Sorbonne, initially (until at least 1952) supervised by the geographer André Cholley. In 1954, he defended his two dissertations under the direction of the sociologist Georges Davy: Les Communautés paysannes pyrénéennes (origine, développement, déclin). Étude de sociologie historique (primary thesis) and Une République pastorale : la vallée de Campan : Organisation, vie et histoire d'une communauté pyrénéenne (secondary thesis).

According to his own recollection, he influenced and became involved with the avant-garde architectural group CoBrA (1948–1951), formed in Paris by Constant Nieuwenhuys, Asger Jorn and others. His early work on method was applauded and borrowed centrally by the philosopher Jean-Paul Sartre in Critique of Dialectical Reason (1960). During Lefebvre's thirty-year stint with the PCF, he was chosen to publish critical attacks on opposed theorists, especially existentialists like Sartre and Lefebvre's former colleague Nizan, only to intentionally get himself expelled from the party for his own heterodox theoretical and political opinions in the late 1950s. He then went from serving as a primary intellectual for the PCF to becoming one of France's most important critics of the PCF's politics (e.g. immediately, the lack of an opinion on Algeria, and more generally, the partial apologism for and continuation of Stalinism) and intellectual thought (i.e. structuralism, especially the work of Louis Althusser).

In 1961, Lefebvre became professor of sociology at the University of Strasbourg, before joining the faculty at the new university at Nanterre in 1965. He was one of the most respected professors, and he had influenced and analysed the May 1968 student revolt. Lefebvre introduced the concept of the right to the city in his 1968 book Le Droit à la ville (the publication of the book predates the May 1968 revolts which took place in many French cities). Following the publication of this book, Lefebvre wrote several influential works on cities, urbanism, and space, including The Production of Space (1974), which became one of the most influential and heavily cited works of urban theory. By the 1970s, Lefebvre had also published some of the first critical statements on the work of post-structuralists, especially Michel Foucault. During the following years he was involved in the editorial group of Arguments, a New Left magazine which largely served to enable the French public to familiarize themselves with Central European revisionism.

Lefebvre died in 1991. In his obituary, Radical Philosophy magazine honored his long and complex career and influence:

the most prolific of French Marxist intellectuals, died during the night of 28–29 June 1991, less than a fortnight after his ninetieth birthday. During his long career, his work has gone in and out of fashion several times, and has influenced the development not only of philosophy but also of sociology, geography, political science and literary criticism.

== Critique of everyday life ==
One of Lefebvre's most important contributions to social thought is the idea of the "critique of everyday life", which he pioneered in the 1930s. Lefebvre defined everyday life dialectically as the intersection of "illusion and truth, power and helplessness; the intersection of the sector man controls and the sector he does not control", and is where the perpetually transformative conflict occurs between diverse, specific rhythms: the body's polyrhythmic bundles of natural rhythms, physiological (natural) rhythms, and social rhythms (Lefebvre and Régulier, 1985: 73). The everyday was, in short, the space in which all life occurred, and between which all fragmented activities took place. It was the residual. While the theme presented itself in many works, it was most notably outlined in his eponymous three-volume study, which came out in individual installments, decades apart, in 1947, 1961, and 1981.

Lefebvre argued that everyday life was an underdeveloped sector compared to technology and production, and moreover that in the mid 20th century, capitalism changed such that everyday life was to be colonized. In this zone of everydayness (boredom) shared by everyone in society regardless of class or specialty, autocritique of everyday realities of boredom vs. societal promises of free time and leisure, could lead to people understanding and then revolutionizing their everyday lives. This was essential to Lefebvre because everyday life was where he saw capitalism surviving and reproducing itself. Without revolutionizing everyday life, capitalism would continue to diminish the quality of everyday life, and inhibit real self-expression. The critique of everyday life was crucial because it was for him only through the development of the conditions of human life—rather than abstract control of productive forces—that humans could reach a concrete utopian existence.

Lefebvre's work on everyday life was heavily influential in French theory, particularly for the Situationists, as well as in politics (e.g. for the May 1968 student revolts). The third volume has also recently influenced scholars writing about digital technology and information in the present day, since it has a section dealing with this topic at length, including analysis of the Nora-Minc Report (1977); key aspects of information theory; and other general discussion of the "colonisation" of everyday life through information communication technologies as "devices" or "services".

== Social production of space ==
Lefebvre dedicated a great deal of his philosophical writings to understanding the importance of (the production of) space in what he called the reproduction of social relations of production. This idea is the central argument in the book The Survival of Capitalism, written as a sort of prelude to La Production de l'espace (The Production of Space, 1974).

Lefebvre contends that there are different modes of production of space (i.e. spatialization) from natural space ('absolute space') to more complex spaces and flows whose meaning is produced in a social way (i.e. social space). Lefebvre analyzes each historical mode as a three-part dialectic between everyday practices and perceptions (le perçu), representations or theories of space (le conçu) and the spatial imaginary of the time (le vécu).

Lefebvre's argument in The Production of Space is that space is a social product, or a complex social construction (based on values, and the social production of meanings) which affects spatial practices and perceptions. Lefebvre argued that every society—and, therefore, every mode of production—produces a certain space, its own space.

Lefebvre's concept has been criticised: e.g. in The Urban Question, Manuel Castells. Many responses to Castells are provided in The Survival of Capitalism, and some such as Andy Merrifield argue that the acceptance of those critiques in the academic world would be a motive for Lefebvre's effort in writing the long and theoretically dense The Production of Space. In "Actually-Existing Success: Economics, Aesthetics, and the Specificity of (Still-)Socialist Urbanism," Michal Murawski critiques Lefebvre's dismissal of actually existing socialism by showing how socialist states produced differential space.

== Bibliography ==
- 1925 "Positions d'attaque et de défense du nouveau mysticisme", Philosophies 5–6 (March). pp. 471–506. (Pt. 2 of the "Philosophy of Consciousness" (Philosophie de la conscience) project on being, consciousness and identity, originally proposed as a DES thesis to Léon Brunschvicg and eventually abandoned—Lefebvre's DES 1920 thesis was titled Pascal et Jansénius (Pascal and Jansenius).)
- 1934 with Norbert Guterman, Morceaux choisis de Karl Marx, Paris: NRF (numerous reprintings).
- 1936 with Norbert Guterman, La Conscience mystifiée, Paris: Gallimard (new ed. Paris: Le Sycomore, 1979).
- 1937 Le nationalisme contre les nations (preface by Paul Nizan), Paris: Éditions sociales internationales (reprinted, Paris: Méridiens-Klincksliek, 1988, Collection "Analyse institutionnelle", introduction Michel Trebitsch, postscript Henri Lefebvre).
- 1938 Hitler au pouvoir, bilan de cinq années de fascisme en Allemagne, Paris: Bureau d'Éditions.
- 1938 with Norbert Guterman, Morceaux choisis de Hegel, Paris: Gallimard (3 reprintings 1938–1939; in the reprinted Collection "Idées", 2 vols. 1969).
- 1938 with Norbert Guterman, Cahiers de Lénine sur la dialectique de Hegel, Paris: Gallimard.
- 1939 Nietzsche, Paris: Éditions sociales internationales.
- 1940 Le Matérialisme dialectique, Paris: PUF. Trans. John Sturrock, Dialectical Materialism, Jonathan Cape Ltd. ISBN 0-224-61507-6
- 1942 "Le Don Juan du Nord", Europe – revue mensuelle 28, April 1948, pp. 73–104.
- 1946 L'Existentialisme, Paris: Éditions du Sagittaire.
- 1947 Logique formelle, logique dialectique, Vol. 1 of A la lumière du matérialisme dialectique, written in 1940–41 (2nd volume censored). Paris: Éditions sociales.
- 1947 Descartes, Paris: Éditions Hier et Aujourd'hui.
- 1947 Critique de la vie quotidienne, Paris: B. Grasset. Trans. John Moore, Critique of Everyday Life Volume 1: Introduction, London: Verso, 1991.
- 1948 Le Marxisme, Paris: PUF.
- 1950 "Knowledge and Social Criticism", in Philosophic Thought in France and the USA, ed. Marvin Farber, Buffalo, N.Y.: University of Buffalo. pp. 281–300 (2nd ed. 1968).
- 1957 La Pensée de Lénine, Paris: Bordas
- 1958 Problèmes actuels du marxisme, Paris: Presses universitaires de France; 4th edition, 1970, Collection "Initiation philosophique"
- 1958 with Lucien Goldmann, Claude Roy, Tristan Tzara, Le romantisme révolutionnaire, Paris: La Nef.
- 1961 Critique de la vie quotidienne II, Fondements d'une sociologie de la quotidienneté, Paris: L'Arche, trans. John Moore, Critique of Everyday Life Volume II: Foundations for a Sociology of the Everyday, London: Verso, 2008.
- 1962 Introduction à la modernité, Paris. Trans. John Moore, Introduction to Modernity: Twelve Preludes, September 1959–May 1961, London: Verso.
- 1963 La vallée de Campan - Etude de sociologie rurale, Paris: Presses Universitaires de France.
- 1965 Métaphilosophie, foreword by Jean Wahl, Paris: Éditions de Minuit, Collection "Arguments". Trans. David Fernbach and ed. Stuart Elden as Metaphilosophy, London: Verso, 2016.
- 1965 La Proclamation de la Commune, Paris: Gallimard, Collection "Trente Journées qui ont fait la France".
- 1966 La Sociologie de Marx, Paris: PUF. Trans. Norbert Guterman, Sociology of Marx, New York: Pantheon.
- 1966 Le langage et la société, Paris: Gallimard.
- 1968 Le Droit à la ville, Paris: Anthropos (2nd ed.); Paris: Ed. du Seuil, Collection "Points". English translation in Writings on Cities, 1996.
- 1968 La Vie quotidienne dans le monde moderne, Paris: Gallimard, Collection "Idées". Trans. Sacha Rabinovitch as Everyday Life in the Modern World, Allen Lane, 1971.
- 1968 L'Irruption de Nanterre au sommet, Paris: Syllepse, 2nd ed. 1998. Trans. Alfred Ehrenfeld, The Explosion: From Nanterre to the Summit, New York: Monthly Review Press.
- 1970 La Révolution urbaine, Paris: Gallimard, Collection "Idées". Trans. Robert Bononno, The Urban Revolution, Minneapolis: University of Minnesota Press, 2003.
- 1970 Du rural à l'urbain, Paris: Anthropos. First half trans. Robert Bononno in On the Rural: Economy, Sociology, Geography, ed. Stuart Elden and Adam David Morton, Minneapolis: University of Minnesota Press.
- 1970 La Fin de l'histoire, Paris: Minuit.
- 1971 Le Manifeste différentialiste, Paris: Gallimard, Collection "Idées".
- 1971 Au-delà du structuralisme, Paris: Anthropos.
- 1972 La Pensée marxiste et la ville, Tournai and Paris: Casterman. Trans. Robert Bononno, Marxist Thought and the City, Minneapolis: University of Minnesota Press.
- 1973 Le Jeu de Kostas Axelos, Paris: Fata Morgana, with Pierre Fougeyrollas.
- 1973 La Survie du capitalisme; la re-production des rapports de production. Partial trans. Frank Bryant as The Survival of Capitalism. London: Allison and Busby, 1976. (The French book includes material originally in L'Irruption, translated in The Explosion, 1969.)
- 1974 La Production de l'espace, Paris: Anthropos. Trans. Donald Nicholson-Smith, The Production of Space, Oxford: Blackwell, 1991. *1991
- 1974 with Leszek Kołakowski "Evolution or Revolution", in Reflexive Water: The Basic Concerns of Mankind, ed. F. Elders, London: Souvenir. pp. 199–267. ISBN 0-285-64742-3
- 1975 Hegel, Marx, Nietzsche, ou le royaume des ombres, Paris: Tournai, Casterman. Collection "Synthèses contemporaines". ISBN 2-203-23109-2. Trans. David Fernbach as Hegel, Marx, Nietzsche or the Realm of Shadows, London: Verso, 2020.
- 1975 Le Temps des méprises: Entretiens avec Claude Glayman, Paris: Stock. ISBN 2-234-00174-9
- 1978 with Catherine Régulier, La révolution n'est plus ce qu'elle était, Paris: Éditions Libres-Hallier (German trans. Munich, 1979). ISBN 2-264-00849-0
- 1976-78 De l'État, Paris: UGE, four volumes, Collection "10/18".
- 1980 Une pensée devenue monde: Faut-il abandonner Marx? Paris: Fayard.
- 1980 La Présence et l'absence, Paris: Casterman. ISBN 2-203-23172-6
- 1981 Critique de la vie quotidienne, III. De la modernité au modernisme (Pour une métaphilosophie du quotidien) Paris: L'Arche. Trans. Gregory Elliott, Critique of Everyday Life Volume III: From Modernity to Modernism (Towards a Metaphilosophy of Daily Life), London: Verso, 2008.
- 1985 with Catherine Régulier-Lefebvre, Le projet rythmanalytique Communications 41. pp. 191–199. Included in Rhythmanalysis, 2004.
- 1986 with Serge Renaudie and Pierre Guilbaud, "International Competition for the New Belgrade Urban Structure Improvement", in Autogestion, or Henri Lefebvre in New Belgrade, Vancouver: Fillip Editions. ISBN 978-0-9738133-5-7
- 1988 "Toward a Leftist Cultural Politics: Remarks Occasioned by the Centenary of Marx's Death" (trans. D. Reifman), in Marxism and the Interpretation of Culture, ed. Lawrence Grossberg and Cary Nelson, Urbana: University of Illinois Press; New York: Macmillan. pp. 75–88. ISBN 0-252-01108-2
- 1990 Du Contrat de citoyenneté, Paris: Syllepse.
- 1991 with Patricia Latour and Francis Combes, Conversation avec Henri Lefebvre, Paris: Messidor, Collection "Libres propos".
- 1992 with Catherine Régulier-Lefebvre, Éléments de rythmanalyse: Introduction à la connaissance des rythmes, preface by René Lorau, Paris: Ed. Syllepse, Collection "Explorations et découvertes". English translation by Stuart Elden and Gerald Moore: Rhythmanalysis: Space, time and everyday life, Continuum, New York, 2004.
- 1996 Writings on Cities, trans. and ed. Eleonore Kofman and Elizabeth Lebas, Oxford: Basil Blackwell. ISBN 0-631-19187-9. Includes The Right to the City and other essays.
- 2002 Méthodologie des Sciences: Un inédit, Paris: Anthropos.
- 2003 Key Writings, ed. Stuart Elden, Elizabeth Lebas, Eleonore Kofman, London/New York: Continuum.
- 2009 State, Space, World: Selected Essays, ed. Neil Brenner and Stuart Elden, trans. Gerald Moore, Neil Brenner and Stuart Elden, Minneapolis: University of Minnesota Press.
- 2014 Toward an Architecture of Enjoyment, ed. Łukasz Stanek, trans. Robert Bononno, Minneapolis: University of Minnesota Press. First publication in any language of a book written in 1973.
- 2022 On the Rural: Economy, Sociology, Geography, ed. Stuart Elden and Adam David Morton, trans. Robert Bononno, Minneapolis: University of Minnesota Press. Includes the first half of his 1970 book Du rural à l'urbain and supplementary texts.

== See also ==
- Spatial turn

== Sources ==
- Elden, Stuart (2004), Understanding Henri Lefebvre: Theory and the Possible, London: Continuum
- Schrift, Alan D. (2006), Twentieth-Century French Philosophy: Key Themes And Thinkers, Blackwell
- Simon, Dylan (2022), "Devenir Henri Lefebvre : Enjeux d'une reconnaissance scientifique en sociologie rurale (années 1940-1950)", Études rurales, 210 (2): 116–140, doi:10.4000/etudesrurales.30248, ISSN 0014-2182
