= Non-simultaneity =

Concept of uneven temporal development in the writings of Ernst Bloch and Marxist theories

Non-simultaneity or nonsynchronism (German: Ungleichzeitigkeit, sometimes also translated as non-synchronicity) is a concept in the writings of Ernst Bloch which denotes the time lag, or uneven temporal development, produced in the social sphere by the processes of capitalist modernization and/or the incomplete nature of those processes. The term, especially in the phrase "the simultaneity of the non-simultaneous", has been used subsequently in predominantly Marxist theories of modernity, world-systems, postmodernity and globalization.

== In the work of Ernst Bloch ==
The phrase "the non-simultaneity of the simultaneous" (die 'Ungleichzeitigkeit' des Gleichzeitigen) was first used by the German art historian Wilhelm Pinder in his 1926 book Das Problem der Generation in der Kunstgeschichte Europas ("The Problem of Generation in European Art History").

Bloch's principal use of the term "non-simultaneity" was in an essay from 1932 which attempted to explain the rise and popularity of Nazism in Germany in the light of the capitalist economic crisis of the Great Depression and which became a chapter of his influential 1935 study Heritage of our Times (Erbschaft dieser Zeit). The essay's central idea is that heterogeneous stages of social and economic development coexist simultaneously in 1930s Germany. Because of uneven modernization, Bloch argues, there remained in Germany, "this classical land of non-simultaneity", significant traces of pre-capitalist relations of production:

"Not all people exist in the same Now. They do so only externally, by virtue of the fact that they may all be seen today. But that does not mean that they are living at the same time with others.

Rather, they carry earlier things with them, things which are intricately involved. One has one's times according to where one stands corporeally, above all in terms of classes. Times older than the present continue to effect older strata; here it is easy to return or dream one's way back to older times. [...] In general, different years resound in the one that has just been recorded and prevails. Moreover, they do not emerge in a hidden way as previously but rather, they contradict the Now in a very peculiar way, awry, from the rear. [...] Many earlier forces, from quite a different Below, are beginning to slip between. [...]

Over and above a great deal of false nonsynchronism [non-simultaneity] there is this one in particular: Nature, and more than that, the ghost of history comes very easily to the desperate peasant, to the bankrupt petty bourgeois; the depression which releases the ghost takes place in a country with a particularly large amount of pre-capitalist material. It is important to ask whether Germany is not more undeveloped, even more vulcanic than, for instance, France, in terms of its power. Certainly it has not formed and evened out capitalist ratio nearly as synchronously."

The text signals that to some extent these ideas derive from Marx's Critique of Political Economy, and in particular his notion of "the unequal rate of development", or "uneven development". Marx had also used the term "simultaneity" (Gleichzeitigkeit) in his explanation of the concentration of production processes under the demands of commodity production in the first volume of Das Kapital (see below). But Bloch's argument is also an attempt to counter simplistic interpretations of Hegelian and Marxist teleology, by introducing what he terms "the polyrhythm and the counterpoint of such dialectics", a "polyphonous", "multispatial" and "multitemporal" dialectics, not in order to deny the possibility of proletarian revolution, but in order to "gain additional revolutionary force from the incomplete wealth of the past":

The still subversive and utopian contents in the relations of people to people and nature, which are not past because they were never quite attained, can only be of use in this way. These contents are, as it were, the goldbearing gravel in the course of previous labor processes and their superstructures in the form of works. Polyphonous dialectics, as a dialectics of the "contradictions" which are more concentrated today than ever, has in any case enough questions and contents in capitalism that are not yet "superseded by the course of economic development".

This argument touches on the need to understand the spatial dynamics of capitalism that would be taken up in the 1960s and 1970s by Marxist urban philosopher Henri Lefebvre, with his analysis of the dialectics of (urban) space, and his work on "rhythmanalysis". It also anticipates the study of the subaltern's "contradicted" relationship to Western modernity undertaken by subaltern studies and postcolonial theory (see below).

== The simultaneity of the non-simultaneous ==
Although often attributed to "Nonsynchronism and the Obligation to its Dialectics", the phrase die Gleichzeitigkeit des Ungleichzeitigen ("the simultaneity of the non-simultaneous" or "the synchronism/synchronicity of the nonsynchronous") — i.e., a reversal of Pinder's "non-simultaneity of the simultaneous" — is not explicitly used in this work. Bloch elaborates instead the idea of synchronous and nonsynchronous contradictions with "the Now". By "synchronous contradiction" he means those forces of contradiction (to capital) that capitalism itself generates, principally the contemporary industrialized proletariat (as analysed by Marx). "Nonsynchronous contradiction" refers to the atavistic survival of an "uncompleted past which has not yet been 'sublated' by capitalism" as discussed above.

== In the work of Marx ==
After the posthumous publication of Marx's Grundrisse in 1939, it became clear that a dialectic of simultaneity and non-simultaneity had been implicit in Marx's thinking on the spatiality and geography of capitalism. Das Kapital (1867–94) had argued on the one hand that the money form had arisen in order to allow for non-simultaneous or delayed exchange of commodities (as opposed to face-to-face bartering), and on the other that "simultaneity" (Gleichzeitigkeit) was a requirement of (and a phenomenon produced by) the demands of commodity production (the capitalist has to be able to synchronize the disparate activities required to manufacture a product). The powerful spatio-temporal effects of the dual demands of exchange and commodity production were summarized in the Grundrisse with the concept of "the annihilation of space by time", i.e. with the imposition of simultaneity or synchronicity over spatial separation and geographical diversity:

The more production comes to rest on exchange value, hence on exchange, the more important do the physical conditions of exchange — the means of communication and transport — become for the costs of circulation. Capital by its nature drives beyond every spatial barrier. Thus the creation of the physical conditions of exchange — of the means of communication and transport — the annihilation of space by time — becomes an extraordinary necessity for it.

At the same time, Marx showed himself to be acutely aware of the resistances to this overcoming of spatio-temporal barriers, and, more importantly, to the fact that capitalism itself generates its own resistances, or contradictions, to the universalization of its mode of production:

But from the fact that capital posits every such limit as a barrier and hence gets ideally beyond it, it does not by any means follow that it has really overcome it, and, since every such barrier contradicts its character, its production moves in contradictions which are constantly overcome but just as constantly posited. Furthermore. The universality towards which it irresistibly strives encounters barriers in its own nature, which will, at a certain stage of its development, allow it to be recognized as being itself the greatest barrier to this tendency, and hence will drive towards its own suspension.

Due to the late publication of the Grundrisse, Bloch would not have been acquainted with these precise words at the time of the writing of "Nonsynchronism", although the similarity of concepts relating to the way in which capitalism posits its own (simultaneous and non-simultaneous) contradictions to production ultimately derives from Das Kapital as discussed above.

== Subsequent use ==
=== In structural Marxism ===
The problematic of simultaneity/non-simultaneity and synchronism/nonsynchronism was taken up in the work of post-Second-World-War Marxist sociologists and philosophers, such as Theodor Adorno, Nicos Poulantzas, Louis Althusser and Étienne Balibar.

As structural Marxists, Althusser and Balibar were concerned to understand how "the problems of diachrony" in the transition from one mode of production to another could be related to the overall structure or "synchrony" of production. In Reading Capital (1970), they argue, in similar vein to Bloch, that the succession of different modes of production as theorized by Marx is not a teleological process driven by "the forward march of the productive forces", but that instead periods of transition are marked by "the coexistence of several modes of production":

Thus it seems that the dislocation [décalage] between the connexions and instances in transition periods merely reflects the coexistence of two (or more) modes of production in a single 'simultaneity ', and the dominance of one of them over the other. This confirms the fact that the problems of diachrony, too, must be thought within the problematic of a theoretical 'synchrony': the problems of the transition and of the forms of the transition from one mode of production to another are problems of a more general synchrony than that of the mode of production itself, englobing several systems and their relations.

For the Greek political sociologist and structural Marxist Nicos Poulantzas, forms of socio-cultural difference such as "territory and historico-cultural tradition [...] produce the uneven development of capitalism as an unevenness of historical moments affecting those differentiated, classified and distinct spaces that are called nations". In State, Power, Socialism (1978), he argues that such differences are in fact a precondition for global capitalist development.

=== Henri Lefebvre and Ernest Mandel ===
Althusser and Balibar's contemporary, Henri Lefebvre, was sharply critical of what he saw as these writers' fetishization of a fixed, abstract and purely structural notion of "general" synchronic space subsuming diachronic or historical processes. By contrast, Lefebvre's own "turbulent spatiality" which "would restore geography to history, history to geography", together with his rhythmanalysis, shares at least a common vocabulary with Bloch's multispatial and multitemporal dialectics. Lefebvre was also one of the first commentators to link uneven development to the production of space on a global scale: "The law of unevenness of growth and development, so far from becoming obsolete, is becoming world-wide in its application — or, more precisely is presiding over the globalization of a world market".

Meanwhile, Belgian Marxist Ernest Mandel was developing, at the same time as Lefebvre, a characterization of "late capitalism" which also refuses the idea that (global) capitalism produces homogeneity. Instead, he argues, capitalism must produce "underdevelopment" in order to maximize the production of surplus profit:

The entire capitalist system thus appears as a hierarchical structure of different levels of productivity, and as the outcome of the uneven and combined development of states, regions, branches of industry and firms, unleashed by the quest for surplus-profit. It forms an integrated unity, but it is an integrated unity of non-homogeneous parts, and it is precisely the unity that here determines the lack of homogeneity. In this whole system development and underdevelopment reciprocally determine each other, for while the quest for surplus-profits constitutes the prime motive power behind the mechanisms of growth, surplus-profit can only be achieved at the expense of less productive regions and branches of production.

=== In Marxist sociology and geography ===
Thinkers as diverse as Immanuel Wallerstein, with his world-systems theory, David Harvey with his analysis of the Limits to Capital (1982) and time–space compression, and Harvey's erstwhile student Neil Smith with his Uneven Development, can all be seen to develop one or other aspect of this line of Marxist thought. The early work of Anthony Giddens and in particular his concept of "time-space distanciation", e.g. in his Critique of Historical Materialism (1981), has also been influential in this area.

=== In theories of modernity and postmodernity ===
Perhaps the most famous use of Bloch's terminology to date is that made by the Marxist cultural critic Fredric Jameson when describing the economic basis of modernism in Postmodernism, or the Cultural Logic of Late Capitalism (1991):

Modernism must thus be seen as uniquely corresponding to an uneven moment of social development, or to what Ernst Bloch called the "simultaneity of the nonsimultaneous," the "synchronicity of the nonsynchronous" (Gleichzeitigkeit des Ungleichzeitigen): the coexistence of realities from radically different moments of history — handicrafts alongside the great cartels, peasant fields with the Krupp factories or the Ford plant in the distance.

Jameson goes on, however, to argue that with the advent of postmodernity and its attendant postmodernisms, the "uneven moment" of modernity has been completely replaced by the mass standardization and homogenization of the third, multinational, phase of capitalist development:

the postmodern must be characterized as a situation in which the survival, the residue, the holdover, the archaic, has finally been swept away without a trace. In the postmodern, then, the past itself has disappeared (along with the well-known "sense of the past" or historicity and collective memory). Where its buildings still remain, renovation and restoration allow them to be transferred to the present in their entirety as those other, very different and postmodern things called simulacra. Everything is now organized and planned; nature has been triumphantly blotted out, along with peasants, petit-bourgeois commerce, handicraft, feudal aristocracies and imperial bureaucracies. Ours is a more homogeneously modernized condition; we no longer are encumbered with the embarrassment of non-simultaneities and non-synchronicities. Everything has reached the same hour on the great clock of development or rationalization (at least from the perspective of the "West"). This is the sense in which we can affirm, either that modernism is characterized by a situation of incomplete modernization, or that postmodernism is more modern than modernism itself.

=== In postcolonial theory ===
Subaltern studies and postcolonial theory, however, tend to maintain that the idea of a globally homogenized space, even under postmodernity, is undercut precisely by Bloch's "nonsynchronous remnants" and diverse temporalities. Homi K. Bhabha, commenting on Jameson, claims that

What is manifestly new about this version of international space and its social (in)visibility is its temporal measure [...] The non-synchronous temporality of global and national cultures opens up a cultural space — a third space — where the negotiation of incommensurable differences creates a tension peculiar to borderline existences.

Postcolonial anthropologist Arjun Appadurai makes a similar point in his book Modernity at Large (1996) via an implicit critique of Wallerstein: "The new global cultural economy has to be seen as a complex, overlapping, disjunctive order that cannot any longer be understood in terms of existing center-periphery models (even those that might account for multiple centers and peripheries)".

== See also ==
- Ernst Bloch
- Uneven development
- Ungleichzeitigkeit
- Time-space compression
