= Herbert Wilhelmy =

German geographer (1910–2003)

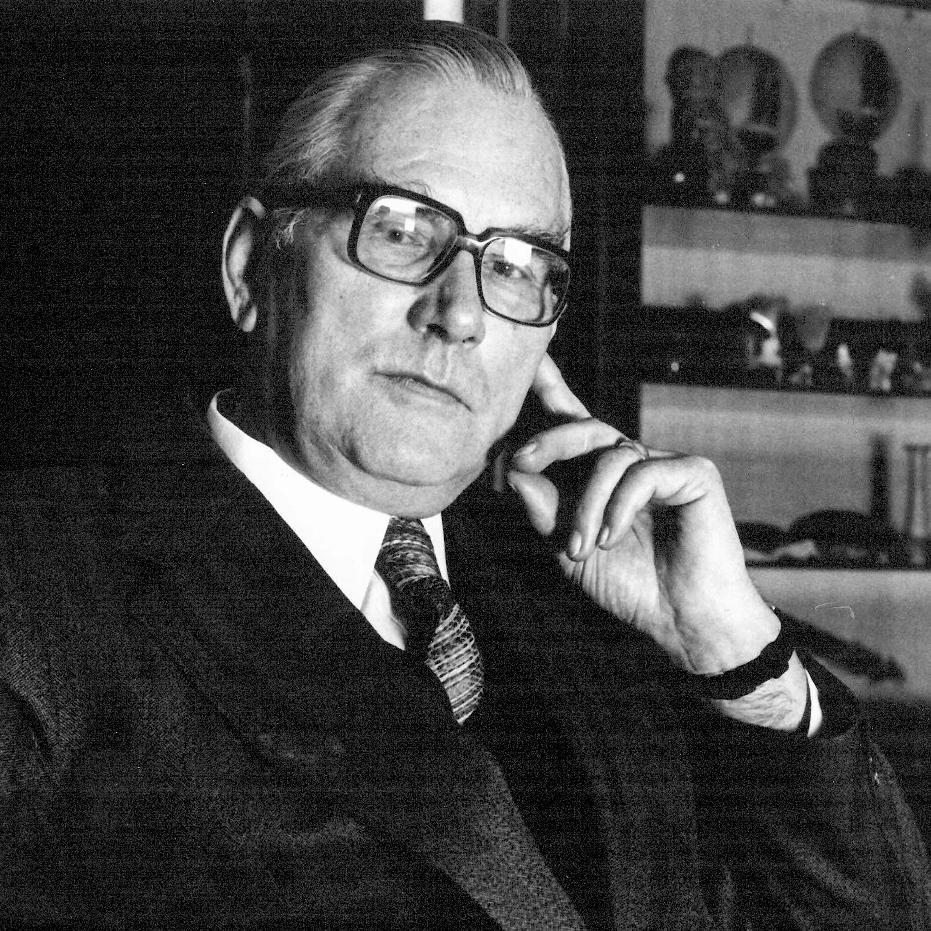
- Born: 4 February 1910; Sondershausen, Germany
- Died: 1 February 2003 (aged 92)
- Education: University of Leipzig
- Known for: Geomorphology, urban morphology
- Scientific career
- Fields: Geography
- Workplaces: University of Tübingen

Herbert Wilhelmy (February 4, 1910 - February 1, 2003) was a German geographer. Wilhelmy has made significant impact in the area of Latin American regional geography, with a focus on climatic geomorphology and, especially, morphogenetic urban geography.

== Background ==
Wilhelmy studied geography, geology und ethnology at the universities of Giessen, Bonn, Vienna (1930) and Leipzig. In 1932 he finished his doctoral degree—supervised by Alfred Hettner's disciple Heinrich Schmitthenner—that treated the geomorphology of western Bulgaria Die Oberflächenformen des Iskergebietes: Eine Morphogenese Westbulgariens. Also his Habilitation in Kiel, as Oskar Schmieder's assistant (from 1932), was dedicated to the Bulgarian Balkan Mountains' settlement and economy—Hoch-Bulgarien: Die ländlichen Siedlungen und die bäuerliche Wirtschaft (1935), Sofia, Wandlungen einer Großstadt zwischen Orient und Okzident (1936). He worked at the University of Kiel 1939–1942 (as contracted lecturer), 1942–1954 as associated professor, interrupted by a work period as meteorologist and research director in Ukraine (1941–1943). In 1954, he became full professor at the University of Stuttgart as Hermann Lautensach's successor. 1959—1960 he researched and taught at the University of California, Berkeley with James J. Parsons—a student of Carl O. Sauer—, generated William M. Denevan's interest for writing a dissertation on the Llanos de Mojos and inspired Chris Field who wrote his dissertation on Southern Andean agricultural terraces. Subsequently, he followed Hermann von Wissmann, son of Hermann von Wissmann, and went to the University of Tübingen, where he retired in 1978. He advised several doctoral and/or post-doctoral students, among others Ralph Jätzold (agricultural geography), Wolfgang Brücher (industrial geography), Axel Borsdorf (settlement geography), Hartmut Leser and Klaus Rother (geomorphology).

== Research ==
Wilhelmy was a universalist, whose research interest bridged the full spectra of Physical geography and Human geography. As a pupil of Oskar Schmieder—in turn an advisee of Alfred Hettner and got in contact with Carl O. Sauer at Berkeley—, he dedicated his work to Latin America, in particular to the cities of the subcontinent as well as to the South American lowlands of Argentina and Paraguay (Pampa, Gran Chaco), and northern Colombia. Initially focusing on settlement and agricultural colonization, he later founded the German tradition of Latin Americanist urban geography at Kiel. In this context, he is considered a prominent representative of the cultural-genetic urban geography tradition, which bases on Oskar Schmieder's kulturmorphogenetische Länderkunde and the concept of cultural regions. Further, he investigated the Indus River basin of Pakistan, where his mentor Oskar Schmieder worked as a Visiting Professor in Karachi, and published monographies on Mayan civilization, Bhutan, and Alexander von Humboldt.

== Memberships ==
- 1955–1957 Chairman of the Zentralverband der deutschen Geographen
- 1957−1959 Chairman of the German Humboldt-Kommission
- 1965−1969 Chairman of the national committee of the International Geographical Union
- from 1973 Member of the Deutsche Akademie der Naturforscher Leopoldina
- Member of the Accademia dei Lincei
- Correspdoning member of the Österreichische Akademie der Wissenschaften and the Academía Colombiana de Ciencias
- Honorary member of the Gesellschaft für Erdkunde zu Berlin and the geographical societies at Stuttgart, Roma, Bogotá, Buenos Aires and Santiago de Chile.
