= Oskar Schmieder =

German geographer

Oskar Schmieder (January 27, 1891 in Bonn, Germany - February 12, 1980 in Schleswig) was a German geographer and expert in the regional geography of Latin America. He spent his early career with Carl O. Sauer at the University of California at Berkeley, where he was an associate professor from 1926 to 1930.

== Life ==
Schmieder studied geography at the University of Bonn, University of Königsberg, and the University of Heidelberg. His dissertation on the Sierra de Gredos was supervised by Alfred Hettner. Although focusing on physical geography, the final conclusions of his dissertation already include a certain notion of the social and cultural-historical forces that are decisive for the genesis of the landscape (later known as the cultural-genetic method); a point of view influenced by Hettner. In 1914 he undertook his first private field trip to Peru, but cancelled his trip in Chile to participate in the First World War.

His first travel to Latin America was crucial for his later career. After his Habilitation under Alfred Philippson in Bonn in 1919, with a study on the settlement geography of Ávila in central Spain, he travelled again to Latin America. Before arriving in Peru and Chile, however, he became a professor of mineralogy and geology at the Universidad Nacional de Córdoba, Argentina, where he remained from 1920 to 1925. Influenced by his mentor Alfred Hettner, who worked on the Colombian Andes, his regional focus was appreciated at the University of California at Berkeley where he worked with Carl O. Sauer as a visiting professor (1925) and Associate Professor (until 1930) (replacing Richard Russel), and contributed the Latin Americanist focus—and probably German geographic methodology—to the development of the Berkeley School. Together, they carried out research in Baja California. During this time, he taught courses in Latin American regional geography visited by Fred B. Kniffen, Samuel N. Dicken, and Julian Steward, among others. Although Sauer offered him the position of full professor, Schmieder decided to go back to Germany. After Schmieder's departure, Sauer himself began to offer seminars on Latin America, yet followed more or less the Länderkunde format of Schmieder, as James J. Parsons lines out:

I was one of his teaching assistants. Sauer's North America course, relentlessly historical, had Daniel Boone "peeping over the crest of the Appalachians" at the term's final lecture. For Latin America he more or less followed the format used by Oscar Schmieder in his Länderkunde with a major concern for aboriginal and colonial geography.

Back to Germany in 1930, he became a professor of geography at the University of Kiel, where he continued his work on Latin America with his disciple and assistant Herbert Wilhelmy. He soon adopted the then dominating nationalist/national socialist mode of thinking, became an admirer of the colonial policies of Fascist Italy, contributed to national socialist Lebensraum research, and became a member of the NSDAP in 1941.

Spurred by the Italian example, the German scholar advocated an enormous population transfer between South America and the ‘Dark Continent’: no less than 200,000 of the 1.2 million people of German origin Schmieder had identified in his scholarly work as living in Argentina and Brazil were to be relocated to Africa in the near future. In his radical plans he felt backed by Hitler, who also supported the return of ethnic Germans living in the Americas to the Volksgemeinschaft.

After a period at the University of Halle, he went back to Kiel. In the 1950s, he was a visiting professor at the University of Karachi and the University of Chile. In a 1967 volume of the Pakistan Geographical Review he was described as "one of the very senior geographers, a chapter in German geography, an image of Hettner, and a successful writer. He is one of the associates of Berkeley school of geography, founded by Carl Sauer". Schmieder was a convinced representative of Länderkunde regional geography.

== Selected works ==
- Die Sierra de Gredos (Dissertation), 1915.
- Die Cordillera del Chani, 1922.
- Zur eiszeitlichen Vergletscherung des Nevado de Chani (Rep. Argentina, Prov. de Jujuy) (Die Erde), 1922
- Argentinien (Geographische Zeitschrift), 1922.
- Condor Huasi – eine befestigte Siedlung der Inkas im südlichen Bolivien (Petermanns Geographische Mitteilungen), 1924
- Spuren spanischer Kolonisation in US-amerikanischen Landschaften, 1928
- The East Bolivian Andes South of the Rio Grande or Guapay (University of California Publications in Geography, Volume II), 1929
- The Pampa, a Natural or Culturally Induced Grass-land? (University of California Publications in Geography, Volume II), 1929
- The Historic Geography of Tucuman (University of California Publications in Geography, Volume II), 1929
- The Brazilian Culture Hearth (University of California Publications in Geography, Volume III), 1929
- Wandlungen im Siedlungsbilde Perus im 15. und 16. Jahrhundert (Geographische Zeitschrift), 1929
- The settlements of the Tzapotec and Mije Indians, state of Oaxaca, Mexico (University of California Press), 1930.
- Länderkunde Südamerikas, 1932.
- Länderkunde Nordamerikas: Vereinigte Staaten und Canada, 1933.
- Länderkunde Mittelamerikas, Westindien, Mexico und Zentralamerika, 1934.
- Die Neue Welt, 2 Bände, 1962–1963.
- Die Alte Welt, 2 Bände, 1965–1969.
- Alexander von Humboldt. Persönlichkeit, wissenschaftliches Werk und Auswirkung auf die moderne Länderkunde (Geographische Zeitschrift), 1964
- Lebenserinnerungen und Tagebuchblätter eines Geographen, 1972.
