= Marxist geography =

Strand of critical geography

Marxist geography is a strand of critical geography that uses the theories and philosophy of Marxism to examine the spatial relations of human geography. In Marxist geography, the relations that geography has traditionally analyzed — natural environment and spatial relations — are reviewed as outcomes of the mode of material production. To fully understand geographical relations, on this view, the social structure must also be examined. Marxist geography attempts to change the basic structure of society.

== Definition ==
Marxism encompasses the ideas of Marx and Engels, revolutionary socialists such as Lenin and later thinkers building on Marx, such as Gramsci. Marxist geography is the Marxist examination of society 'from the vantage point of space, place, scale and human transformation of nature'. Marxist geographers argue that incorporating Marxist thinking into Geography enriches geographical thinking. For Marxist geographers, it is imperative that space be understood both as a fundamental component of capitalist production and the relations of production. Some of the major concepts developed by Marxist geographers include uneven geographical development, historical-geographical materialism, and the production of space. Today, some of the most prominent Marxist geographers include David Harvey, Andy Merrifield, and Neil Brenner.

== Philosophy ==
Marxist geography is radical in nature and its primary criticism of the positivist spatial science centered on the latter's methodologies, which failed to consider the characteristics of capitalism and abuse that underlie socio-spatial arrangements. As such, early Marxist geographers were explicitly political in advocating for social change and activism; they sought, through application of geographical analysis of social problems, to alleviate poverty and exploitation in capitalist societies. Marxist geography makes exegetical claims regarding how the deep-seated structures of capitalism act as a determinant and a constraint to human agency. Most of these ideas were developed in the late 1960s and early 1970s out of dissatisfaction with the quantitative revolution in geography and spurred on by the founding of the journal Antipode. In some cases, these movements were led by former "space cadets" such as David Harvey and Bill Bunge, who were at the forefront of the quantitative revolution.

To accomplish such philosophical aims, these geographers rely heavily upon Marxist social and economic theory, drawing on Marxian economics and the methods of historical materialism to tease out how the means of production control human spatial distribution in capitalist structures. Marx is also invoked to examine how spatial relationships are affected by class. The emphasis is on structure and structural mechanisms.

== See also ==
- Labor geography
- Social metabolism
