= Uneven and combined development =

Concept in Marxian political economy

Uneven and combined development (also known as "unequal and combined development", and similar to "uneven development") is a concept in Marxian political economy, Marxist sociology, political science and social geography. It refers to the different patterns of development within and between countries trading in the world economy, characterized by the coexistence of traditional and modern economic systems, as well as the coexistence of old and new political systems.

The idea was most famously used by Leon Trotsky in the early 20th century to analyze the possibilities for industrialization and political emancipation in the Russian Empire, and the likely future of the Tsarist regime. After 1905, the theory of uneven and combined development became the basis of Trotsky's political perspective of permanent revolution. Trotsky rejected the idea that human society inevitably had to develop through a uni-linear sequence of necessary "stages" of modernization; instead, backward countries could adopt the most advanced knowledge and technology from other countries for the purpose of accelerated development, without the need to repeat all the preceding stages to get there.

In the 1990s and the early 21st century, the concept of uneven and combined development experienced an academic revival among Marxist scholars in fields such as development theory and economic geography. David Harvey endorsed the usefulness of this concept to understand the spatial development of global capitalism.

== Background ==
Trotsky's concept was originally inspired by a series of articles by Alexander Helphand (better known as "Parvus") on "War and Revolution" in the Russian journal Iskra in 1904. The theory was not exactly new; Nikolay Chernyshevsky, Vasily Vorontsov, and others had proposed similar ideas.

At first, Trotsky used this concept only to describe a characteristic evolutionary pattern in the worldwide expansion of the capitalist mode of production from the 16th century onwards, through the growth of a world economy which connected more and more peoples and territories together through trade, migration and investment. His focus was also initially mainly on the history of the Russian empire, where the most advanced technological and scientific developments co-existed with extremely primitive and superstitious cultures.

In the 1920s and 1930s, Trotsky increasingly generalised the concept of uneven and combined development to the whole of human history, and even to processes of evolutionary biology, as well as the formation of the human personality - as a general dialectical category.

The concept played a certain role in the fierce theoretical debates during the political conflict between the supporters of Joseph Stalin and Trotsky's Left Opposition, a debate which ranged from the historical interpretation of the Russian revolution and economic strategies for the transition to socialism, to the correct understanding of principles of Marxism.

=== Trotsky's theory ===
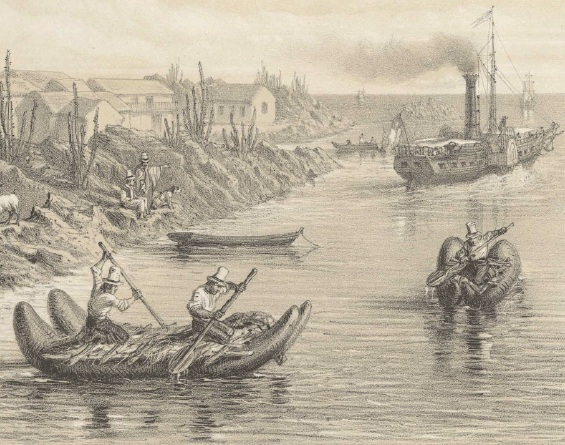
A modern steamboat and primitive rafts in the Chilean port of Huasco in the 1850s illustrate the concept of uneven development.

Different countries, Trotsky observed, developed and advanced to a large extent independently from each other, in ways which were quantitatively unequal (e.g. the local rate and scope of economic growth and population growth) and qualitatively different (e.g. nationally specific cultures and geographical features). In other words, countries had their own specific national history with national peculiarities.

At the same time, all the different countries did not exist in complete isolation from each other; they were also interdependent parts of a world society, a larger totality, in which they all co-existed together, in which they shared many characteristics, and in which they influenced each other through processes of cultural diffusion, trade, political relations and various "spill-over effects" from one country to another.

Sociologically speaking, this had five main effects:

- a more backward, older or more primitive country would adopt parts of the culture of a more advanced, or more modern society, and a more advanced culture could also adopt or merge with parts of a more primitive culture – with good or bad effects.
- Cultural practices, institutions, traditions and ways of life belonging to both very old and very new epochs and phases of human history were all combined, juxtaposed and linked together in a rather unusual way, within one country.
- In turn, this meant that one could not really say that different societies all developed simply through the same sort of linear sequence of necessary developmental stages, but rather that they could adopt/utilize the results of developments reached elsewhere, without going through all the previous evolutionary stages which led up to those results. Some countries could thus "skip", "telescope" or "compress" developmental stages which other countries took hundreds of years to go through, or, very rapidly carry through a modernization process that took other countries centuries to achieve.
- Different countries could both aid or advance the socio-economic progress of other countries through trade, subsidies and contributing resources, or block and brake other countries as competitors from making progress by preventing the use of capital, technology, trading routes, labour, land or other kinds of resources. In Trotsky's theory of imperialism, the domination of one country by another does not mean that the dominated country is prevented from development altogether, but rather that it develops mainly according to the requirements of the dominating country. For example, an export industry will develop around mining and farm products in the dominated country, but the rest of the economy is not developed, so that the country's economy becomes more unevenly developed than it was before, rather than achieving balanced development. Or, a school system is set up with foreign assistance, but the schools teach only the messages that the dominating country wants to hear (see How to Read Donald Duck).
- The main tendencies and trends occurring at the level of world society as a whole, could be also found in each separate country, where they combined with unique local trends – but this was a locally specific "mix", so that some world trends asserted themselves more strongly or faster, others weaker and slower in each specific country. Thus, a country could be very advanced in some areas of activity, but at the same time comparatively retarded in other areas. One effect was that the response to the same events of world significance could be quite different in different countries, because the local people attached different "weightings" to experiences and therefore drew different conclusions.

According to Trotsky, the unequal and combined development of different countries had an effect on the class structure of society.

- For example, the Russian empire in 1917 was largely a peasant society composed of many different nationalities and governed by an absolutist state headed by the Czar; popular democracy did not exist. Criticism of the state, or opposition to its policies, was very severely punished (imprisonment, deportation, execution).
- A process of industrialization had begun in the main cities since Peter the Great (for example, the Putilov steel works established in Petrograd - where the February 1917 revolution began, with a strike - was the largest in the world at the time). But this urban industrialization process relied mainly on the investment of foreign capital from France, Britain and other countries, and was limited to some urban areas and regions.
- The Russian bourgeoisie which developed under the tutelage of the Czarist state lacked much power, and was politically weak. The bourgeoisie was unable to establish political democracy. The rural population was kept in a backward condition. At the same time, a militant industrial working class developed in the main cities, concentrated in large factories and plants.
- In this way, the archaic culture of primitive peasant production and a semi-feudal state combined with the culture of modern industrial society.

Trotsky believed that this would shape the unique character of the Russian revolution. Namely, the Russian bourgeoisie was politically too weak and too dependent on the Czarist state to challenge its autocratic rule, and therefore the revolution against Czarist rule would be spearheaded by the revolt of urban workers.

Thus, the political and modernizing tasks normally associated in Europe with the leadership of the rising bourgeoisie, such as fighting for popular democracy and civil rights against absolutism, land ownership reform, industrializing the country, and national self-determination for oppressed nationalities, would have to be carried out in the Russian empire under the leadership of working-class parties, in particular the Russian Social-Democratic Labor Party which had been outlawed (although there were several other socialist, nationalist and liberal parties).

In the chaos towards the end of the First World War, in which Russian soldiers fought against the imperial German army, this political assessment proved largely correct. The provisional government established by the February revolution in 1917 collapsed and the October revolution, in which the Russian Marxists played a dominant role, destroyed Czarist state power completely. Thereafter, the Russian bourgeoisie was largely expropriated; most businesses then fell under state ownership.

A new stage in Trotsky's understanding of uneven and combined development in world history was reached in his analyses of fascism and populism in Germany, France, Spain and Italy. Trotsky makes it clear, the human progress is not a linear, continuously advancing process of bourgeois modernization - progress can also be reversed or undone, and ancient cults, superstitions or barbarous traditions can be revived, even though nobody previously thought that was possible.

=== Rudolf Hilferding's theory ===
Around the time that Trotsky settled in Vienna as a journalist in exile, after escaping from Siberia a second time, the Austro-Marxist Rudolf Hilferding wrote his famous book Finance Capital (first published in 1910) in which Hilferding mentions an idea very similar to Trotsky's. The passage occurs in chapter 22 on "the export of capital and the struggle for economic territory". It has never been proved whether Hilferding was influenced in any way by what Trotsky had written, although it is known that they corresponded with each other, but Hilferding's own analysis of "the latest phase of capitalist development" certainly influenced a whole generation of socialist leaders. In any case similar notions were widespread among socialists throughout Central, Eastern, and Southeastern Europe at this time. Among other things, Hilferding states:

The export of capital, especially since it has assumed the form of industrial and finance capital, has enormously accelerated the overthrow of all the old social relations, and the involvement of the whole world in capitalism. Capitalist development did not take place independently in each individual country, but instead capitalist relations of production and exploitation were imported along with capital from abroad, and indeed imported at the level already attained in the most advanced country. Just as a newly established industry today does not develop from handicraft beginnings and techniques into a modern giant concern, but is established from the outset as an advanced capitalist enterprise, so capitalism is now imported into a new country in its most advanced form and exerts its revolutionary effects far more strongly and in a much shorter time than was the case, for instance, in the capitalist development of Holland and England.

Hilferding's insight was rarely noticed by English-speaking Marxists. His book Finance Capital, which went out of print several times, was never translated into English until 1981 (i.e. 70 years later). After the publication of Lenin's classic interpretation of imperialism as the highest (and final) stage of capitalism in 1917, most Marxist writers based their analyses of imperialism on Lenin's book. Although in several places Lenin cites Hilferding approvingly, by the time that Hilferding became Finance Minister in Germany in 1923, the Leninists regarded him as a reformist renegade, and his analyses were no longer trusted, published or taken seriously.

== Contemporary applications ==
The concept of uneven and combined development, as formulated by Trotsky, as well as Lenin's concept of uneven economic and political development under capitalism are still used in academic studies of international relations, archaeology, anthropology and development economics, as well as in political discussions of the Trotskyist movement. International relations schools such as the world-systems theory and dependency theory have been influenced by Lenin's writings on imperialism and Trotsky's writings on world development.

The 2015 book How the West Came to Rule: The Geopolitical Origins of Capitalism refers to the theory in a non-Eurocentric approach to the development of capitalism.

=== Economic geography ===
Geography has produced influential scholarship on the idea of uneven development. Geography started to lean left politically before the 1970s resulting in a particular interest in questions of inequality and uneven development (UD). UD has since become somewhat of a homegrown theory in Geography as geographers have worked to explain what causes inequality within different scales of space, locally, nationally and internationally. Key scholars in this field include Doreen Massey, Neil Smith and David Harvey.

Uneven development results from the "spatially and temporally uneven processes and outcomes that are characteristic, and functional to capitalism".

- Much of neoclassical economic theory holds that features of unevenness, such as income inequality, equalizes as a result of capital diffusion throughout the open market.
- Proponents argue that investment liberalization allows foreign capital to invest in capital-poor countries, yielding the highest rates of return, and that global integration promotes competitive advantage.
- Neoclassical theory contends that newly globalized, liberalized and capitalized developing countries have the added advantage over developed countries in that they are able to draw on existing markets, capital flow regimes and technologies.

This has the effect of placing all countries on an even playing field. The result is a global economy in equilibrium, or in other words, convergence. As such, in the neoclassical view, uneven development is merely an interim stage of economic development that can be erased by the free market.

Marxist geographers, on the other hand, assert that uneven development is persistently produced and reproduced by capital diffusion, and therefore, is an inherent and permanent feature of capitalism. Unlike the neoliberal contention of the erasure of disparities towards convergence, Marxists maintain that capital accumulation depends on differential economic climates for its regeneration. Harvey states that accumulation "is the engine which powers growth under the capitalist mode of production. The capitalist system is therefore highly dynamic and inevitably expansionary". The dynamism of capitalism is due to its persistent search for competitive advantage and consequently, its movement away from oversaturated economies towards new spaces from which it can extract greater profit. For instance, developed economies are characterized by high land rents and wages, and unionized labour, translating into high costs of production and lower gains. By contrast, developing economies have abundant pliable labour, and low rents and wages. As such, it is favourable for capital investments to move into the latter economy from the former in the interest of gaining greater rates of return. Kiely argues that capital diffusion throughout the global market remains a highly uneven process marked by reversals of comparative advantage and by cycles of investment and disinvestment, having the effect of elevating some spaces while simultaneously marginalizing others.

Differential economic environments have material effects on the ground. Processes of capital accumulation through space and time create new geographic landscapes shaped by crisis, deindustrialization and capital flight on the one hand, and influxes of capital and industrialization on the other. Capitalism not only reshuffles core-periphery relations, but rather, as Smith claims, it also penetrates all geographic scales. At the urban scale, differential rent gaps trigger investment and disinvestment in particular neighborhoods driving gentrification. On the global scale, integrated economies provoke time-space compression enabling enhanced communication and capital mobility. Smith argues that the subsequent erosion of the nation scale as the primary agent created a pivotal link between the global and urban scales. Since the 1990s, the increasingly integrated global economy has given greater importance to the role of the city. Indeed, world city building has become the geographical force of capitalism. New spaces of accumulation in Asia, Latin America and Africa are gaining competitive advantage as new centres of command and control and of surplus capital.

Other elements of neoliberal thought such as reducing the "left arm" of the state including welfare and support for the poor create even bigger inequalities between residents of the same areas, also resulting in uneven development.

==== Tom Nairn and the revival of nationalism ====
Marxist historian Tom Nairn has argued that uneven development can also lead to peripheral nationalism, for example in Scotland. Peripheral regions tend to promote nationalist movements when regional inequalities overlap with ethnic differences, or when membership of a larger state no longer presents advantages. In underdeveloped regions, nationalist movements mobilise the population against the persistence of ethnic economic inequality.

==== Helena Norberg-Hodge and uneven development in Northern India ====
Helena Norberg-Hodge is an economist who spent more than 30 years in Ladakh. She argues that uneven development and crises often affect people now because of past economic activities. To solve the problem, the fundamental economic approach needs change from "globalizing" to "localizing". Localization can contribute to reduce CO_{2} emission, solve the economic problems, and restore biodiversity as well as cultural diversity. Localizing is one of the ways to create secure jobs in the global population.

Norberg-Hodge based her argument on her experience of witnessing changes in Ladakh, before and after the region was subsidized to enhance economic activities and promote development. The subsidies meant that products from thousands of miles away could be sold cheaper than locally made products, which destroyed the local market. It quickly lead to unemployment and religious strife. Norberg-Hodge raised critical questions about the effects of spending on infrastructure (such as roads) intended to stimulate the economy and reduce costs, in order to achieve greater social wellbeing. The point is, that the globalized economy enables people to control other places from a far distance, without knowing the situation in the region. Large investments subsidizing the transportation system make products from thousands of miles away cheaper than locally made products. Rather than improving the local community, the local market collapses and local people lose their jobs, while investors far away make a lot of profit from business ventures that create more unequal development than there was before.

== See also ==
- Alexander Gerschenkron
- Backwardness
- Development theory
- Late industrialisation
- Non-simultaneity
- Strategy of unbalanced growth
