= Urban geography =

Subdiscipline of geography concentrating on urban areas

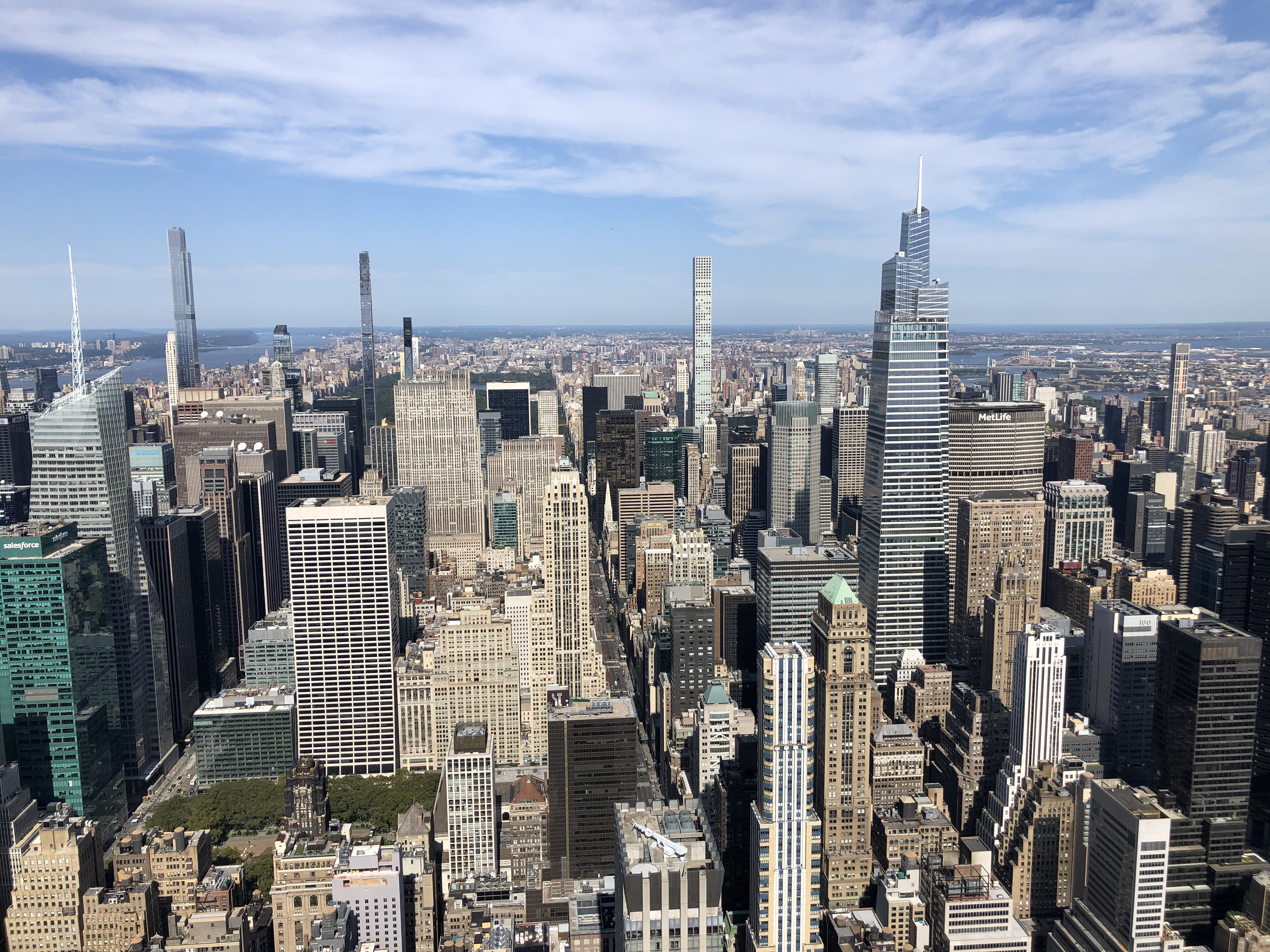
New York City, one of the largest urban areas in the world

Urban geography is the subdiscipline of geography that derives from a study of cities and urban processes. Urban geographers and urbanists examine various aspects of urban life and the built environment. Scholars, activists, and the public have participated in, studied, and critiqued flows of economic and natural resources, human and non-human bodies, patterns of development and infrastructure, political and institutional activities, governance, decay and renewal, and notions of socio-spatial inclusions, exclusions, and everyday life. Urban geography includes different other fields in geography such as the physical, social, and economic aspects of urban geography. The physical geography of urban environments is essential to understand why a town is placed in a specific area, and how the conditions in the environment play an important role with regard to whether or not the city successfully develops. Social geography examines societal and cultural values, diversity, and other conditions that relate to people in the cities. Economic geography is important to examine the economic and job flow within the urban population. These various aspects involved in studying urban geography are necessary to better understand the layout and planning involved in the development of urban environments worldwide.

== History of the discipline ==
Urban geography arrived as a critical sub-discipline with the 1973 publication of David Harvey's Social Justice and the City, which was heavily influenced by previous work by Anne Buttimer. Prior to its emergence as its own discipline, urban geography served as the academic extension of what was otherwise a professional development and planning practice. At the turn of the 19th century, urban planning began as a profession charged with mitigating the negative consequences of industrialization as documented by Friedrich Engels in his geographic analysis of the condition of the working class in England, 1844.

In a 1924 study of urban geography, Marcel Aurousseau observed that urban geography cannot be considered a subdivision of geography because it plays such an important part. However, urban geography did emerge as a specialized discipline after World War II, amidst increasing urban planning and a shift away from the primacy of physical terrain in the study of geography. Chauncy Harris and Edward Ullman were among its earliest exponents.

Urban geography arose by the 1930s in the Soviet Union as an academic complement to active urbanization and communist urban planning, focusing on cities' economic roles and potential.

Spatial analysis, behavioral analysis, Marxism, humanism, social theory, feminism, and postmodernism have arisen (in approximately this order) as overlapping lenses used within the field of urban geography in the West.

Geographic information science, using digital processing of large data sets, has become widely used since the 1980s, with major applications for urban geography.

== Research topics ==
=== Cities as centers of manufacturing and services ===
Cities differ in their economic makeup, their social and demographic characteristics, and the roles they play within the city system. One can trace these differences back to regional variations in the local resources on which growth was based during the early development of the urban pattern and in part to the subsequent shifts in the competitive advantage of regions brought about by changing locational forces affecting regional specialization within the framework of a market economy. The recognition of different city types is critical for the classification of cities in urban geography. For such classification, emphasis given in particular to functional town classification and the basic underlying dimensions of the city system.

The purpose of classifying cities is twofold. On the one hand, it is undertaken to search reality for hypotheses. In this context, the recognition of different types of cities on the basis of, for example, their functional specialization may enable the identification of spatial regularities in the distribution and structure of urban functions and the formulation of hypotheses about the resulting patterns. On the other hand, classification is undertaken to structure reality in order to test specific hypotheses that have already been formulated. For example, to test the hypotheses that cities with a diversified economy grow at a faster rate than those with a more specialized economic base, cities must first be classified so that diversified and specialized cities can be differentiated.

The simplest way to classify cities is to identify the distinctive role they play in the city system. There are three distinct roles:

1. central places functioning primarily as service centers for local hinterlands
2. transportation cities performing break-of-bulk and allied functions for larger regions
3. specialized-function cities, dominated by one activity such as mining, manufacturing or recreation and serving national and international markets

The composition of a city's labor force has traditionally been regarded as the best indicator of functional specialization, and different city types have been most frequently identified from the analysis of employment profiles. Specialization in a given activity is said to exist when employment in it exceeds some critical level.

The relationship between the city system and the development of manufacturing has become very apparent. The rapid growth and spread of cities within the heartland-hinterland framework after 1870 was conditioned to a large extent by industrial developments, and the decentralization of population within the urban system in recent years is related in large part to the movement of employment in manufacturing away from traditional industrial centers. Manufacturing is found in nearly all cities, but its importance is measured by the proportion of total earnings received by the inhabitants of an urban area. When 25 percent or more of the total earnings in an urban region derive from manufacturing, that urban area is arbitrarily designated as a manufacturing center.

The location of manufacturing is affected by myriad economic and non-economic factors, such as the nature of the material inputs, the factors of production, the market and transportation costs. Other important influences include agglomeration and external economies, public policy and personal preferences. Although it is difficult to evaluate precisely the effect of the market on the location of manufacturing activities, two considerations are involved:

- the nature of and demand for the product
- transportation costs

=== Urbanization ===
Urbanization, the transformation of population from rural to urban, is a major phenomenon of the modern era and a central topic of study.

=== Patterns of Urban Development and Infrastructure ===
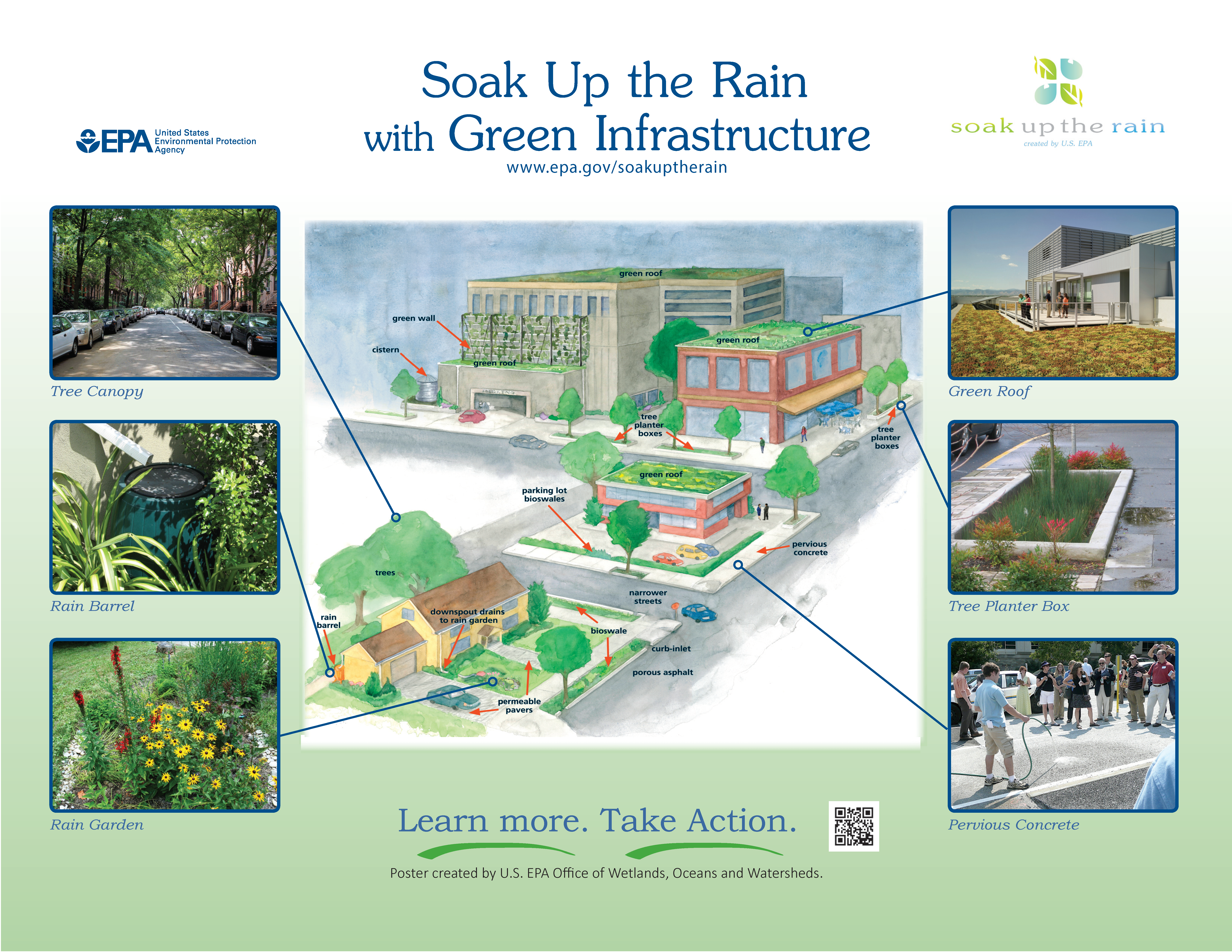
A poster from the EPA entitled "Soak Up the Rain with Green Infrastructure." The poster depicts various green infrastructure that can be effective in preventing floods.

The development pattern of a place, such as a city or neighborhood, describes how buildings and human activities are arranged and organized on the landscape. Urban environments are composed of hard infrastructure, such as roads and bridges, and soft infrastructure, such as health and social services. The construction of urban areas is facilitated through urban planning and architecture. To combat the negative environmental effects of urban development, green infrastructure such as community gardens and parks, sewage and waste systems, and the use of solar energy have been implemented in many cities. The use of green infrastructure has been effective in responding to climate change and reducing flood risks. Green infrastructure, such as home and urban gardens, have been found to not only improve air quality but also promote mental well-being.

=== Flow of Economic and Natural Resources Within Urban Environments ===
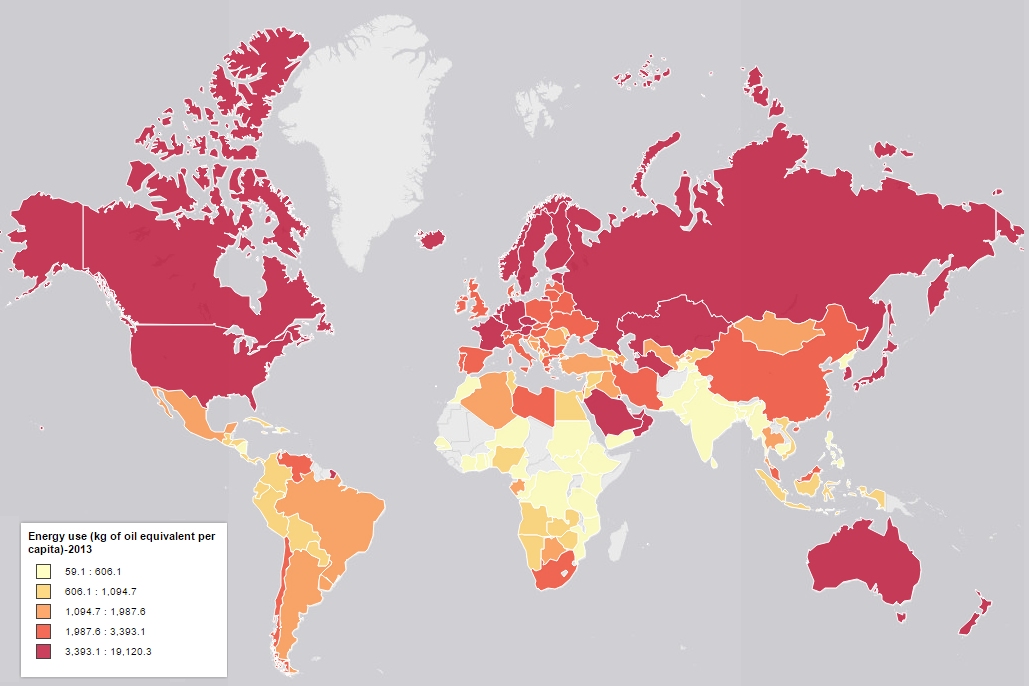
A map showing the world energy consumption per capita based on 2013 data from the World Bank.

Over the years, the development of urban environments has continued to increase due to globalization and urbanization. According to the UN, the world's population in urban areas is estimated to increase from 55% to 68% by the year 2050. The increase in the development of urban environments leads to the increase in economic flow and utilization of natural resources. As the population in urban areas continue to grow, the use of direct energy and transport energy tends to increase and is estimated to increase in the future.

According to the study conducted by Creutzig et al., the current energy usage is projected to increase from 240 EJ in 2005 to 730 EJ in the year 2050 if worldwide urbanization continues. As more people move to the cities in search of work, business tends to follow suit. Thus, cities will develop the need for new infrastructures such as schools, hospitals, and various public facilities. The development of these types of soft infrastructure can lead to a positive impact on the residents. For instance, soft infrastructure can promote economic growth through allowing its residents to specialize in different areas of expertise. The diversification of careers within the urban population can increase the economic flow within the urban area.

=== Human Interactions Within Urban Environments ===
The development of soft infrastructure within urban areas provide people with ways to connect with one another as a community as well as ways to seek support services. Community infrastructure includes areas and services that allow human beings to interact with one another. Such interactions can be facilitated through health services, educational institutions, outreach centers, and community groups. Human interactions with their urban environments can lead to both positive and negative effects. Humans depend on their environment in order to get essential resources, such as good air quality, food and shelter. This natural environmental dependence can lead to the over exploitation of natural resources as the need for such resources increase. Humans can also modify their environment in order to meet their goals. For instance, humans can clear land or agriculture in order to develop urbanized buildings such as commercial skyscrapers and public housing. The clearing of land to pave the way for urbanization can lead to negative environmental impacts such as deforestation, decreased air quality, and wild life displacement.

=== Social and Political Flow Within Urban Environments ===
As populations within cities grew over the years, the need to create forms of local government emerged. To maintain order within developing cities, politicians are elected to address environmental and societal issues within the population. For instance, the influence of local and state political dynamics plays an important role in how actions are taken place to combat climate change and housing issues.

== Research interest ==
Urban geographers are primarily concerned with the ways in which cities and towns are constructed, governed and experienced. Alongside neighboring disciplines such as urban anthropology, urban planning and urban sociology, urban geography mostly investigates the impact of urban processes on the earth's surface's social and physical structures. Urban geographical research can be part of both human geography and physical geography.

The two fundamental aspects of cities and towns, from the geographic perspective are:

1. Location ("systems of cities"): spatial distribution and the complex patterns of movement, flows and linkages that bind them in space; and
2. Urban structure ("cities as systems"): study of patterns of distribution and interaction within cities, from quantitative, qualitative, structural, and behavioral perspectives.

== Impact of Urban Geography ==
=== Environmental Impact ===
The environment of urban areas is developed through the concept of urbanization. Urbanization is the transition from rural town-structured communities to urban city-structured communities. This transition is because humans are pulled to cities because of jobs and even welfare. In cities, problems will arise such as environmental degradation. The increasing population can lead to poor air quality and quality and availability of water. The growth of urbanization can lead to more use of energy which leads to air pollution and can impact human health. Flash flooding is another environmental hazard that can occur due to urban development. The concept of urbanization plays an important role in the study of urban geography because it involves the formation of urban infrastructures such as sanitation, sewage systems, and the distribution of electricity and gas.

=== Societal Impact ===
The migration form rural to urbanized areas is fueled by their search for jobs, education, and social welfare. There are trends in urbanization that are influenced by push and pull factors. The push factors include the increasingly high growth of rural areas which leads many people to migrate to the cities in search of better livelihood opportunities, a good quality of life, and a higher standard of living. People are forced to leave their rural homes and move to various cities because of various factors such as low agricultural productivity, poverty, and food insecurity. In addition to the push factors, there are also the pull factors, which "pull" people to cities for better opportunities, better education, proper public health facilities, and also entertainment which offers employment opportunities. The gentrification of urban environments leads to an increase in income gaps, racial inequality, and displacement within metropolitan areas. The negative environmental impacts of urbanization disproportionately effects minority low income areas more than higher income communities.

=== Climate Impact ===
The increasing demand for new building infrastructure within densely populated cities resulted in an increase in air pollution due to the high energy usage within these urban areas. The increasing energy use leads to an increase in heat emissions, which results in global warming. Cities are a key contributor to climate change because urban activities are a major source of greenhouse gas emissions. It was estimated that cities are responsible for about 75% of global carbon dioxide emissions, with the inclusion of transportation and buildings being the largest contributor. In order to combat the negative environmental impacts urbanization, many modern cities develop environmentally conscious infrastructure. For instance, the implementation of public transportation such as train and bus systems help to lessen the use of cars within cities. The use of solar energy can also be found in many commercial and residential buildings, which helps to lessen the reliance on non-renewable energy resources.

=== Biodiversity Impact ===
Urbanization has a great impact on biodiversity. As cities develop, vital habitats are destroyed or fragmented into patches which leads to them not being big enough to support complex ecological communities. In cities, species can become endangered or locally extinct. The human population is the main contributor to the expansion of urban areas. As urban areas grow from increasing human population and from migration, this can result in deforestation, habitat loss, and extraction of freshwater from the environment which can decrease biodiversity and alter the species ranges and interaction. Some additional cause-and-effect relationships between urban geography and ecosystems include habitat loss which decreases the species' populations, ranges, and interaction among organisms, the life cycles, and traits can help species survive and reproduce in disturbed ecosystems. The paving of land with concrete can increase water runoff, increase erosion, and soil quality can also decrease.

== Notable urban geographers and urbanists ==
- Ash Amin
- Mike Batty
- Walter Benjamin
- Anne Buttimer
- Michel de Certeau
- Tim Cresswell
- Mike Davis
- Friedrich Engels
- Matthew Gandy
- Peter Hall (urbanist)
- Milton Santos
- David Harvey
- Jane Jacobs
- Henri Lefebvre
- David Ley
- Peter Marcuse
- Doreen Massey
- Don Mitchell
- Aihwa Ong
- Gillian Rose (geographer)
- Ananya Roy
- Neil Smith (geographer)
- Allen J. Scott
- Edward W. Soja
- Michael Storper
- Fulong Wu
- Akin Mabogunje
- Loretta Lees

== See also ==
- Arbia's law of geography
- Chicago school (sociology)
- Commuter town
- Concepts and Techniques in Modern Geography
- Garden city movement
- Gentrification
- Index of urban studies articles
- Infrastructure
- Municipal or urban engineering
- Rural sociology
- Settlement geography
- Tobler's first law of geography
- Tobler's second law of geography
- Urban agriculture
- Urban area
- Urban ecology
- Urban economics
- Urban field
- Urban sociology
- Urban studies
- Urban vitality
