= Spaces of Hope =

2000 book by David W. Harvey

- Cover
- Author: David W. Harvey
- Language: English
- Series: California studies in critical human geography
- Subject: Communism, critical geography, equality, marxian economics, social justice, socialism, regional disparities, spaces in economics, utopianism, utopian socialism,
- Genre: Non-fiction
- Publisher: Edinburgh University Press
- Publication date: January 2000
- Publication place: United States
- Pages: 320
- ISBN: 9780748612680

Spaces of Hope is a book by British Marxist geographer David W. Harvey. It was published in 2000 by the Edinburgh University Press.

== Summary ==
The book critically addresses the socio-economic landscape at the close of the twentieth century. Harvey highlights the widening wealth gap, the consolidation of power in large corporations, environmental degradation, and the lack of political will to address these issues. Through a lens of Marxist analysis, he explores the uneven geographical development of late-twentieth-century capitalism and its impact on the working body. He advocates for a transformative approach, urging individuals to become architects of a more just living and working environment, bridging the personal and global scales. Examining the history of utopian movements, the book questions their failures and suggests a new form of utopian thinking, termed dialectical utopianism, emphasizing the need to consider human qualities in political ideologies. The author concludes with a personal utopian vision, emphasizing the importance of hope and imagination in envisioning a more equitable world.

== Reception ==
In his review, Andrew Herod presented an analysis of the book. Herod noted that the geographical context of reading the book in Africa, particularly while he was traveling in Lagos, Nigeria, added a challenging dimension to Harvey's call for the left to cultivate utopian imaginations. Herod acknowledged Harvey's attempt to rejuvenate the political project of a seemingly defeatist left by emphasizing the enduring relevance of Marxist analysis in the face of neoliberal globalization. The review outlined the four main sections of the book, highlighting Harvey's focus on the production of space within capitalist social systems, the impact of globalization on bodies, the effects of deindustrialization on working-class bodies in Baltimore, and the exploration of constructing alternate emancipatory spaces. Herod commended Harvey's efforts to engage with postmodernist concepts and encouraged a more optimistic outlook on transforming the world. Despite being a departure from Harvey's previous work, the review described Spaces of Hope as a provocative and interesting read, providing inspiration for those seeking a better world.

David Wood praised Harvey's argument against Gramsci's notion of "pessimism of the intellect, optimism of the will," advocating instead for an "optimism of the intellect." The review lauded Harvey's insightful and concise exploration of various topics in the first two parts, particularly emphasizing his treatment of uneven development, rights, the body, and globalization. Wood highlighted the exceptional quality of the book in its third and fourth parts, focusing on Utopianism and alternatives, and expressed admiration for Harvey's shining moments in these sections. The reviewer appreciated Harvey's dialectical Utopianism rooted in socioecological reality and the material base of evolutionary change. The convergence of Marxist and green thinking was acknowledged, along with Harvey's critique of postmodernism. The review concluded by characterizing Spaces of Hope as an important and empowering work, bringing together diverse debates and authors in a synergy of Utopian vision and practical politics.
