= Julian Steward =

American anthropologist (1902 – 1972)

Julian Haynes Steward
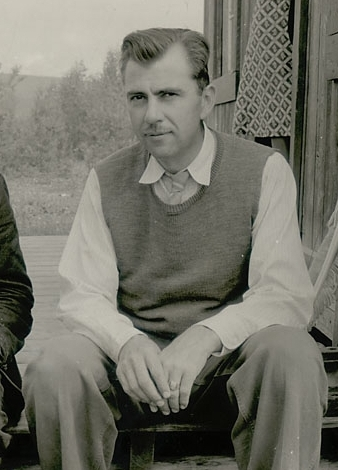
- Steward in 1940
- Born: January 31, 1902; Washington, D.C., U.S.
- Died: February 6, 1972 (aged 70); Urbana, Illinois, U.S.
- Education: Deep Springs College; Cornell University (BS); University of California, Berkeley (MA, PhD)
- Occupation: Anthropologist
- Spouse(s): Dorothy Nyswander (1894–1998) (married 1930–1932); Jane Cannon Steward (1908–1988) (married 1933–1972)
- Children: Garriott Steward Michael Steward two grandchildren

Julian Haynes Steward (January 31, 1902 – February 6, 1972) was an American anthropologist known best for his role in developing "the concept and method" of cultural ecology, as well as a scientific theory of culture change.

== Early life and education ==
Steward was born in Washington, D.C., where he lived on Monroe Street, NW, and later, Macomb Street in Cleveland Park.

At age 16, Steward left an unhappy childhood in Washington, D.C. to attend boarding school in Deep Springs Valley, California, in the Great Basin. Steward's experience at the newly established Deep Springs Preparatory School (which later became Deep Springs College), high in the White Mountains had a significant influence on his academic and career interests. Steward's "direct engagement" with the land (specifically, subsistence through irrigation and ranching) and the Northern Paiute Amerindians that lived there became a "catalyst" for his theory and method of cultural ecology. (Kerns 1999; Murphy 1977)

As an undergraduate, Steward studied for a year at UC Berkeley, with two of his professors being Alfred Kroeber and Robert Lowie, after which he transferred to Cornell University, from which he graduated in 1925 with a B.Sc. in zoology. Although Cornell, like most universities at the time, did not have an anthropology department, its president, Livingston Farrand, had previously been a professor of anthropology at Columbia University. Farrand advised Steward to continue pursuing his interest (or, in Steward's words, his already chosen "life work") in anthropology at Berkeley (Kerns 2003:71–72). Steward studied as directed by Kroeber and Lowie—- and was taught by Oskar Schmieder in regional geography—- at Berkeley, where his dissertation The Ceremonial Buffoon of the American Indian, a Study of Ritualized Clowning and Role Reversals was accepted in 1929.

== Career ==
Steward later established an anthropology department at the University of Michigan, where he taught until 1930, when he was replaced by Leslie White, with whose model of "universal" cultural evolution he disagreed, although it became popular and gained the department fame and notoriety. In 1930 Steward relocated to the University of Utah, which appealed to him for its proximity to the Sierra Nevada, and nearby archaeological fieldwork opportunities in California, Nevada, Idaho, and Oregon.

Steward's research interests mainly concerned "subsistence"—- the dynamic interaction of man, environment, technology, social structure, and the organization of work—- which Kroeber regarded as "eccentric", original, and innovative. (EthnoAdmin 2003) In 1931, Steward, needing money, began fieldwork on the Great Basin Shoshone for Kroeber's Culture Element Distribution (CED) survey; in 1935 he received an appointment to the Smithsonian's Bureau of American Ethnography (BAE), which published some of his most influential works. Among them: Basin-Plateau Aboriginal Sociopolitical Groups (1938), which "fully explicated" the paradigm of cultural ecology, and helped decrease the diffusionist emphasis of American anthropology.

For eleven years Steward was an administrator of considerable influence, editing the Handbook of South American Indians. He also had a job with the Smithsonian Institution, where he initiateded the Institute for Social Anthropology in 1943. He also served on a committee to reorganize the American Anthropological Association and played a role in the creation of the National Science Foundation. He was also active in archaeological pursuits, successfully lobbying Congress to create the Committee for the Recovery of Archaeological Remains (the beginning of what is known presently as 'salvage archaeology') and worked with Gordon Willey to establish the Viru Valley project, an ambitious research program involved with Peru.

Steward searched for cross-cultural regularities in an effort to discern principles of culture and culture change. His work explained variation in the complexity of social organization as being limited to within a range possibilities by the environment. In evolutionary terms, he described cultural ecology as "multi-linear", in contrast to the unilinear typological models popular during the 19th century, and Leslie White's "universal" model. Steward's most important theoretical contributions happened during his teaching years at Columbia (1946–53).

Steward's most productive years theoretically were from 1946 to 1953, while teaching at Columbia University. During this time, Columbia had an influx of World War II veterans who were attending school due to the GI Bill. Steward quickly developed a coterie of students who would later have enormous influence in the history of anthropology, including Sidney Mintz, Eric Wolf, Roy Rappaport, Stanley Diamond, Robert Manners, Morton Fried, Robert F. Murphy, and Vera D. Rubin, and influenced other scholars such as Marvin Harris. Many of these students participated with the Puerto Rico Project, yet another large-scale group research study that concerned modernization in Puerto Rico.

Steward quit Columbia for the University of Illinois at Urbana-Champaign, where he directed the Anthropology Department and continued to teach until his retirement in 1968. There he began yet another large-scale study, a comparative analysis of modernization in eleven third world societies. The results of this research were published in three volumes entitled Contemporary Change in Traditional Societies. Steward died in 1972.

== Work and influence ==
In addition to his role as a teacher and administrator, Steward is remembered most for his method and theory of cultural ecology. During the first three decades of the twentieth century, American anthropologists were suspicious of generalizations and often unwilling to generalize conclusions from the meticulously detailed monographs that they produced. Steward is notable for developing a more nomothetic, social-scientific style. His theory of "multilinear" cultural evolution examined the way in which societies adapted to their environment. This method was more nuanced than Leslie White's theory of "universal evolution", which was influenced by philosophers such as Lewis Henry Morgan. Steward's interest in the evolution of society also caused him to examine processes of modernization. He was one of the first anthropologists to examine the way in which national and local levels of society were related to one another. He questioned the possibility of creating a social theory which encompassed the entire evolution of humanity; yet, he also argued that anthropologists are not limited to description of specific, existing cultures. Steward believed it is possible to create theories analyzing typical, common culture, representative of specific eras or regions. As the decisive factors determining the development of a given culture, he indicated technology and economics, while noting that there are secondary factors, such as political systems, ideologies, and religions. These factors cause a given society to evolve in several ways at the same time.

Steward initially emphasized ecosystems and physical environments, but soon became interested in how these environments could influence cultures (Clemmer 1999: ix). It was during Steward's teaching years at Columbia, which lasted until 1952, that he wrote arguably his most important theoretical contributions: "Cultural Causality and Law: A Trial Formulation of the Development of Early Civilizations (1949b), "Area Research: Theory and Practice" (1950), "Levels of Sociocultural Integration" (1951), "Evolution and Process (1953a), and "The Cultural Study of Contemporary Societies: Puerto Rico" (Steward and Manners 1953). Clemmer writes, "Altogether, the publications released between 1949 and 1953 represent nearly the entire gamut of Steward's broad range of interests: from cultural evolution, prehistory, and archaeology to the search for causality and cultural "laws" to area studies, the study of contemporary societies, and the relationship of local cultural systems to national ones (Clemmer 1999: xiv)."

In regard to Steward's Great Basin work, Clemmer writes, " ... [his philosophy] might be characterized as a perspective that people are in large part defined by what they do for a living, can be seen in his growing interest in studying the transformation of slash-and-burn horticulturists into national proletariats in South America" (Clemmer 1999: xiv). Clemmer does mention two works that contradict his characteristic style and reveal a less familiar aspect to his work, which are "Aboriginal and Historic Groups of the Ute Indians of Utah: An Analysis and Native Components of the White River Ute Indians" (1963b) and "The Northern Paiute Indians" (Steward and Wheeler-Vogelin 1954; Clemmer 1999; xiv).
