= California Prison Moratorium Project =

The California Prison Moratorium Project is a grassroots organization co-founded by Dr. Ruth Gilmore, involved in Prison Abolition through Critical Resistance, and Ernesto Saveedra, a youth advocate, for the purpose of stopping "all public and private prison construction in California". Over its activist life, the CPMP has partnered with a number of groups including Critical Resistance, The California Coalition for Women Prisoners, Californians United for a Responsible Budget (CURB), and many other abolitionist organizations to move forward in their goal of halting any erection of additional penal facilities within the state of California. In 2001 they successfully worked to prevent construction of a new Delano Prison.
