= David Harvey =

British-American geographer and anthropologist

David Harvey FBA
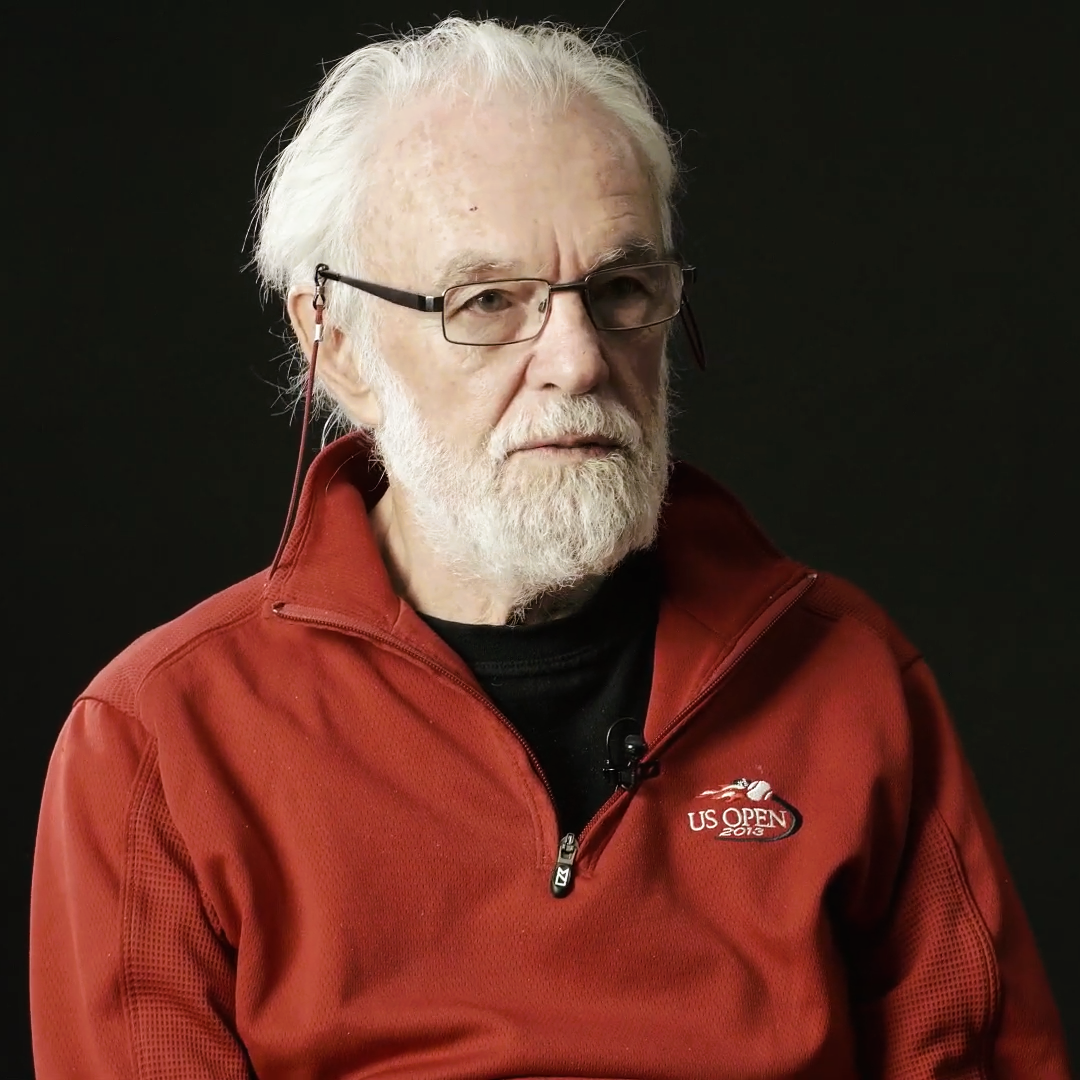
- Harvey in 2014
- Born: David William Harvey; 31 October 1935 (age 90); Gillingham, Kent, England
- Education: St John's College, Cambridge
- Known for: Marxist geography, quantitative revolution in geography, critical geography, economic anthropology, political anthropology, right to the city, time space compression, accumulation by dispossession
- Scientific career
- Fields: Anthropology, geography, political economy, social theory
- Workplaces: CUNY Graduate Center
- Thesis: Aspects of agricultural and rural change in Kent, 1800–1900 (1961)
- Doctoral advisor: Richard Chorley
- Doctoral students: Andy Merrifield
- Website: davidharvey.org

David William Harvey FBA (born 31 October 1935) is a British-American academic best known for Marxist analyses that focus on urban geography as well as the economy more broadly. He is a Distinguished Professor of anthropology and geography at the Graduate Center of the City University of New York (CUNY). Harvey has authored many books and essays that have been prominent in the development of modern geography as a discipline. He is a proponent of the idea of the right to the city.

In 2007, Harvey was listed as the 18th most-cited author of books in the humanities and social sciences in that year, as established by counting citations from academic journals in the Thomson Reuters ISI database. He has amassed over 403,000 citations on Google Scholar's database.

== Early life and education ==
David Harvey lecturing a class

David W. Harvey was born in 1935 in Gillingham, Kent. He attended Gillingham Grammar School for Boys and St John's College, Cambridge, for both his undergraduate and post-graduate studies. Harvey's early work, beginning with his PhD (on hops production in 19th century Kent), was historical in nature, emerging from a regional-historical tradition of inquiry widely used at Cambridge and in Britain at that time. Historical inquiry runs through his later works (for example on Paris).

== Career ==
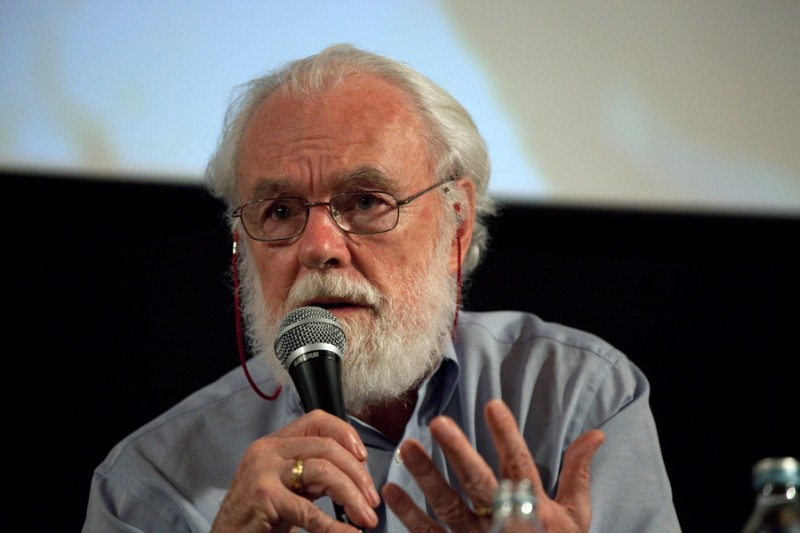
David Harvey at Subversive Festival

By the mid-1960s, Harvey followed trends in the social sciences to employ quantitative methods, contributing to spatial science and positivist theory. Roots of this work were visible while he was at Cambridge: the Department of Geography also housed Richard Chorley, and Peter Haggett. His Explanation in Geography (1969) was a landmark text in the methodology and philosophy of geography, applying principles drawn from the philosophy of science in general to the field of geographical knowledge. But after its publication Harvey moved on again, to become concerned with issues of social injustice and the nature of the capitalist system itself. He has never returned to embrace the arguments made in Explanation, but still he conforms to the critique of absolute space and exceptionalism in geography of the regional-historical tradition that he saw as an outcome of Kantian synthetic a priori knowledge.

=== 1970s Growth of Marxist geography and urban geography ===
Moving from Bristol University to Johns Hopkins University in Baltimore in the United States, he positioned himself centrally in the newly emerging field of radical and Marxist geography. Injustice, racism, and exploitation were visible in Baltimore, and activism around these issues was tangible in the early 1970s US East Coast, perhaps more so than in Britain. The journal Antipode was formed at Clark University; Harvey was one of the first contributors. The Boston Association of American Geographers meetings in 1971 were a landmark, with Harvey and others disrupting the traditional approach of their peers. In 1972, in an essay on ghetto formation, he argued for the creation of "revolutionary theory", theory "validated through revolutionary practice".

==== Social Justice and the City (1973) ====
One of the most important subfields impacted by the rise of Marxist geography was in urban geography. Harvey established himself as the leader of this subfield with the publication of Social Justice and the City (1973). Harvey argued in this book that geography could not remain 'objective' in the face of urban poverty and associated ills. It makes a contribution to Marxist theory by arguing that capitalism annihilates space to ensure its own reproduction.

=== 1980s consolidation of Marxist geography and materialist critique of postmodernism ===
Dialectical materialism has guided his subsequent work, notably the Limits to Capital (1982), which furthers the radical geographical analysis of capitalism, and several books on urban processes and urban life have followed it. In 'Limits to Capital' Harvey expanded and innovated Marxist theory with respect to the functioning of money and finance, and the 'spatial moment' in the unfolding of capitalist crisis formation. The Condition of Postmodernity (1989), written while a professor at Oxford, was a best-seller (the London The Independent named it as one of the fifty most important works of non-fiction to be published since 1945, and it is cited 50,000 times by 2023). It is a materialist critique of postmodern ideas and arguments, suggesting these actually emerge from contradictions within capitalism itself. Justice, Nature and the Geography of Difference (1996) focuses on social and environmental justice (although its dialectical perspective has attracted the ire of some Greens.). Spaces of Hope (2000) has a utopian theme and indulges in speculative thinking about how an alternative world might look.

His study of Second Empire Paris and the events surrounding the Paris Commune in Paris, Capital of Modernity, is his most elaborated historical-geographical work. The onset of US military action since 2001 has provoked a critique – in The New Imperialism (2003) he argues that the war in Iraq allows US neo-conservatives to divert attention from the failures of capitalism 'at home'. His next work, A Brief History of Neoliberalism (2005), provides an historical examination of the theory and divergent practices of neoliberalism since the mid-1970s. This work conceptualises the neoliberalised global political economy as a system that benefits few at the expense of many, and which has resulted in the (re)creation of class distinction through what Harvey calls "accumulation by dispossession". His book The Enigma of Capital (2010) takes a long view of the contemporary economic crisis. Harvey explains how capitalism came to dominate the world and why it resulted in the 2008 financial crisis. He describes that the essence of capitalism is its amorality and lawlessness and to talk of a regulated, ethical capitalism is to make a fundamental error. A series of events linked to this book across London academic forums, such as the LSE, proved popular and sparked a new interest in Harvey's work.

Harvey returned to Johns Hopkins from Oxford in 1993, but spent increasing time elsewhere as a speaker and visitor, notably as a Miliband Fellow at the London School of Economics in the late 1990s. In 1996, he delivered the Ellen Churchill Semple lecture at the Department of Geography, University of Kentucky. He moved to the City University of New York in 2001 as a distinguished professor, now residing in its Department of Anthropology. He has spent most of his academic career in Anglo-America, with brief sojourns in France and a range of foreign visiting appointments (currently as acting Advisory Professor at Tongji University in Shanghai). He has supervised many PhD students. Several of these, such as Neil Smith, Richard Walker, Erik Swyngedouw, Michael Johns, Maarten Hajer, Patrick Bond, Melissa Wright, and Greg Ruiters now hold or held important academic positions themselves.. In 2013 Harvey was asked by the Republic of Ecuador to help set up the National Strategic Center for the Right to the Territory (CENEDET), which he directed with the urbanist Miguel Robles-Durán until its allegedly forced closure in 2017.

Critical response to Harvey's work has been sustained. In the early years, there was competition between Harvey and proponents of quantitative and non-politicized geography, notably Brian Berry. A recent critical appraisal (Castree & Gregory, 2006) explores some critiques of Harvey in detail.

=== Reading Marx's Capital ===
Two constants in Harvey's life and work have been teaching a course on Marx's Capital and his support for student activism and community and labour movements (notably in Baltimore). His course was put into a YouTube lecture series, which gained immense popularity and resulted in two companion books covering the three volumes of Marx's Capital.

== Political stances ==
Harvey was a signatory of the petition "We will not be a party to this crime" launched in January 2016 by the Academics for Peace (Barış İçin Akademisyenler) to protest Recep Tayyip Erdoğan government's ongoing military crackdown on Kurds in the south-east of Turkey (following the November 2015 general election) that included the siege of Sur, the siege of Cizre and the Şırnak clashes.

In October 2019, he announced his withdrawal from participation in the fourth edition of Turkey's International Congress of Urban Studies (Uluslararası Kent Araştırmaları Kongresi) held in Ankara to register his protest against the ongoing Turkish offensive against the Syrian Democratic Forces in northeastern Syria, which he denounced as a "crime against humanity".

== Recognition ==
David Harvey is widely recognised as a foundational scholar in urban geography. Harvey's books have been widely translated. He holds honorary doctorates from Roskilde (Denmark), Buenos Aires (Argentina), the Faculty of Social Sciences at Uppsala University (Sweden), Ohio State University (USA), Lund University (Sweden), the University of the Republic (Uruguay) and the University of Kent (UK). Among other awards he has received the Anders Retzius Gold Medal of the Swedish Society for Anthropology and Geography, the Patron's Medal of the Royal Geographical Society and the Vautrin Lud International Prize in Geography (France). He was made a fellow of the British Academy in 1998, and was elected to the American Academy of Arts and Sciences in 2007. He is a member of the Interim Committee for the emerging International Organization for a Participatory Society.

== Personal life ==
Harvey resides in New York. He has a daughter, Delfina, born in January 1990.

== Institutional affiliations ==
- B.A. (Hons) St John's College, Cambridge, 1957
- PhD St John's College, Cambridge, 1961
- Post-doc, University of Uppsala, Sweden 1960–1961
- Lecturer, Geography, University of Bristol, UK (1961–1969)
- Associate Professor, Department of Geography and Environmental Engineering, Johns Hopkins University (1969–1973)
- Professor, Department of Geography and Environmental Engineering, Johns Hopkins University (1973–1987, and 1993–2001)
- Halford Mackinder Professor of Geography, University of Oxford (1987–1993)
- Distinguished Professor, Dept. of Anthropology, City University of New York (2001–present)

== Selected bibliography ==
- Explanation in Geography (1969)
- Social Justice and the City (1973)
- The Limits to Capital (1982; updated editions: 1999 and 2006)
- The Urbanization of Capital (1985)
- Consciousness and the Urban Experience (1985)
- The Condition of Postmodernity: An Enquiry into the Origins of Cultural Change (1989)
- The Urban Experience (1989)
- (edited, with Teresa Hayter) The Factory and the City: The Story of the Cowley Automobile Workers in Oxford (1994)
- Justice, Nature and the Geography of Difference (1996)
- Megacities Lecture 4 (2000)
- Spaces of Hope (2000)
- Spaces of Capital: Towards a Critical Geography (2001)
- The New Imperialism (2003)
- Paris, Capital of Modernity (2005)
- A Brief History of Neoliberalism (2005)
- Spaces of Global Capitalism: Towards a Theory of Uneven Geographical Development (2006)
- introduction to Marx and Engels, The Communist Manifesto (2008)
- Cosmopolitanism and the Geographies of Freedom (2009)
- Social Justice and the City: Revised Edition (2009)
- A Companion to Marx's Capital (2010)
- The Enigma of Capital and the Crises of Capitalism (2010)
- Rebel Cities: From the Right to the City to the Urban Revolution (2012)
- A Companion to Marx's Capital, Volume 2 (2013)
- Seventeen Contradictions and the End of Capitalism (2014)
- The Ways of the World (2016)
- Marx, Capital and the Madness of Economic Reason (2017)
- The Anti-Capitalist Chronicles (2020)
- A Companion to Marx's Grundrisse (2023)
- The Story of Capital: What Everyone Should Know About How Capital Works (2026)

== Articles, lectures and interviews ==
- Harvey, D. 2000. Possible Urban Worlds. The Fourth Megacities Lecture. The Hague.
- Merrifield, A. 2002. David Harvey: The Geopolitics of Urbanization. In Metromarxism: A Marxist Tale of the City. New York: Routledge.
- Harvey, D. 2002. Chapter in Geographical Voices: Fourteen Autobiographical Essays. Ed. p Gould and FR Pitts. Syracuse University Press.
- Harvey, D. and Kreisler, H. 2004. A Geographer's Perspective on the New American Imperialism. Conversations with History. Institute of International Studies, UC Berkeley. audio video
- Castree, N. 2004. David Harvey. In Key Thinkers on Space and Place, eds. Hubbard, Kitchin, Valentine. Sage Pubs.
- Castree, N., Essletzbichler, J., Brenner, N. 2004. "Symposium: David Harvey's 'The Limits to Capital': Two Decades On." Antipode 36(3):400–549.
- Harvey, D. 2005. A Brief History of Neoliberalism. University of Chicago Center for International Studies Beyond the Headlines Series. 26 October 2005. audio
- Harvey, D. and Choonara, J. 2006. "A War Waged by the Wealthy", an interview in SR magazine covering Harvey's account of neoliberalism and class.
- Jones, J.P. III, T.Mangieri, M.McCourt, S.Moore, K.Park, M.Pryce-Jones, K.Woodward. 2006. David Harvey Live. New York: Continuum.
- Castree, N. and Gregory, D. 2006. David Harvey: a Critical Reader. Oxford: Blackwell. Trevor Barnes chapter
- Harvey, D. 2006. Neoliberalism and the City. Middlebury College, Rohatyn Center for International Affairs Symposium, "Urban Landscapes: The Politics of Expression". 29 September 2006. audio video
- Ashman, S. 2006. "Symposium: On David Harvey's 'The New Imperialism'." Historical Materialism 14(4): 3–166.
- Lilley, S. 2006 On Neoliberalism: An Interview with David Harvey MR Zine 19 June 2006.
- Harvey, D. 2006. Neoliberalism and the City. 22nd Annual University of Pennsylvania Urban Studies Public Lecture. 2 November 2006. audio
- Harvey, D. 2007. The Neoliberal City. Lecture at Dickinson College, sponsored by the Clarke Forum for Contemporary Issues. 1 Feb 2007. audio video
- Harvey, D., Arrighi, G., Andreas, J., 2008. Symposium on Giovanni Arrighi's Adam Smith in Beijing. 5 March 2008. Red Emma's of Baltimore. video
- A Conversation With David Harvey
- Harvey, D. 2008 Reading Marx's Capital An open course consisting of a close reading of the text of Marx's Capital Volume I in 13 video lectures by David Harvey.
- Escobar, P., 2008 The State of Empire: Pepe Escobar talks to David Harvey The Real News Network 19 August 2008.
- Schouten, P., 2008 Theory Talk #20: David Harvey on the Geography of Capitalism, Understanding Cities as Polities and Shifting Imperialisms Theory Talks 9 October 2008.
- Harvey, D. 2008 The Right to the City, 'New Left Review', October 2008
- Harvey, D. 2008. The Enigma of Capital. A lecture at City University of New York Graduate Center on 14 November 2008 audio
- Harvey, D. 2008. A Financial Katrina – Remarks on the Crisis. A lecture at City University of New York Graduate Center on 29 October 2008 audio
- Harvey, D. 2009. Why the U.S. Stimulus Package is Bound To Fail. 12 January 2009.
- Harvey, David (2009). "Reshaping Economic Geography: The World Development Report 2009". Development and Change. 40 (6 "Forum 2009"). The Hague: Institute of Social Studies, via (Wiley-)Blackwell: 1269–1277. doi:10.1111/j.1467-7660.2009.01602.x. ISSN 0012-155X. EBSCOhost 46767205.
- Harvey, D. 2009. Organizing for the Anti-Capitalist Transition. Draws heavily on his forthcoming [April 2010] book,The Enigma of Capital. 16 December 2009.
- Harvey, D. 2010. The Crises of Capitalism Lecture given at the RSA, London. Provides a concise overview of the argument presented in The Enigma of Capital and the Crises of Capitalism. Includes question and answer session after lecture. 26 April 2010.
- Harvey, D. 2010. The Crises of Capitalism (abridged and animated) Animated (and abridged) version of 2010 RSA Lecture above. Concise and humorous introduction to Harvey's thought on the 2007–08 economic crisis. 28 June 2010.
- Harvey, D. et al. 2011. Territorial Justice, Human Flourishing and Geographical Strategies of Liberation, Justice spatiale | Spatial Justice.
- Oudenampsen, Robles-Durán, Miguel. 2011 Mobility, Crisis, Utopia An Interview with David Harvey.
- Harvey, D. 2013. Focaal Interview Interviewed by Zoltan Gluck for Focaal: Journal of Global and Historical Anthropology. 12 December 2013.
- Harvey, D. 2014. The 17 Contradictions of Capitalism, London School of Economics and Political Science.
- Harvey, D and Panitch, Leo. Beyond Impossible Reform and Improbable Revolution. Jacobin. 1 January 2015.
- Harvey, D. 2018. White Mirror Interviewed by Jeremy Scahill on Intercepted podcast. The Intercept. 17 January 2018. Segment begins at 1:16:00.

Awards
Preceded by Dimitris Milonakis and Ben Fine	Deutscher Memorial Prize; 2010	Succeeded by Jairus Banaji
