= Rent-gap theory =

Economic theory

The rent-gap theory was developed in 1979 by the geographer Neil Smith as an economic explanation for the process of gentrification. It describes the disparity between the current rental income of a property and the potentially achievable rental income. From this difference arises the interest of investors to renovate blocks or entire neighborhoods, resulting in an increase in rents and real estate value.

Investment in the property market will only be made if a rent gap exists. Thus, the rent gap theory is contrary to explanations for gentrification that focus on cultural and consumption preferences and housing preferences. It is mainly an economic approach that sees cultural factors as secondary. Leslie Kern has noted that the rent gap approach helps to explain why gentrification happens in areas that seemingly lack the cultural characteristics that might make it appealing to wealthier inhabitants (for instance Little Village in Chicago): it is exactly in those areas that the disparity between the current and potential land use is exceptionally large.

In his original 1979 exploration of the concept, Smith noted that the rent gap could be used to explain why gentrification occurred both in North America and Europe despite differences in suburbanization and city structures. The theory has also been applied to other regions of the world, including Chile, Lebanon, and Korea.

The theory has further been used in agent-based modelling of the effects of gentrification on real estate markets.

== See also ==
- Bid rent theory
- Thünen's model of agricultural land use
