= Ruth Wilson Gilmore =

American abolitionist and prison scholar

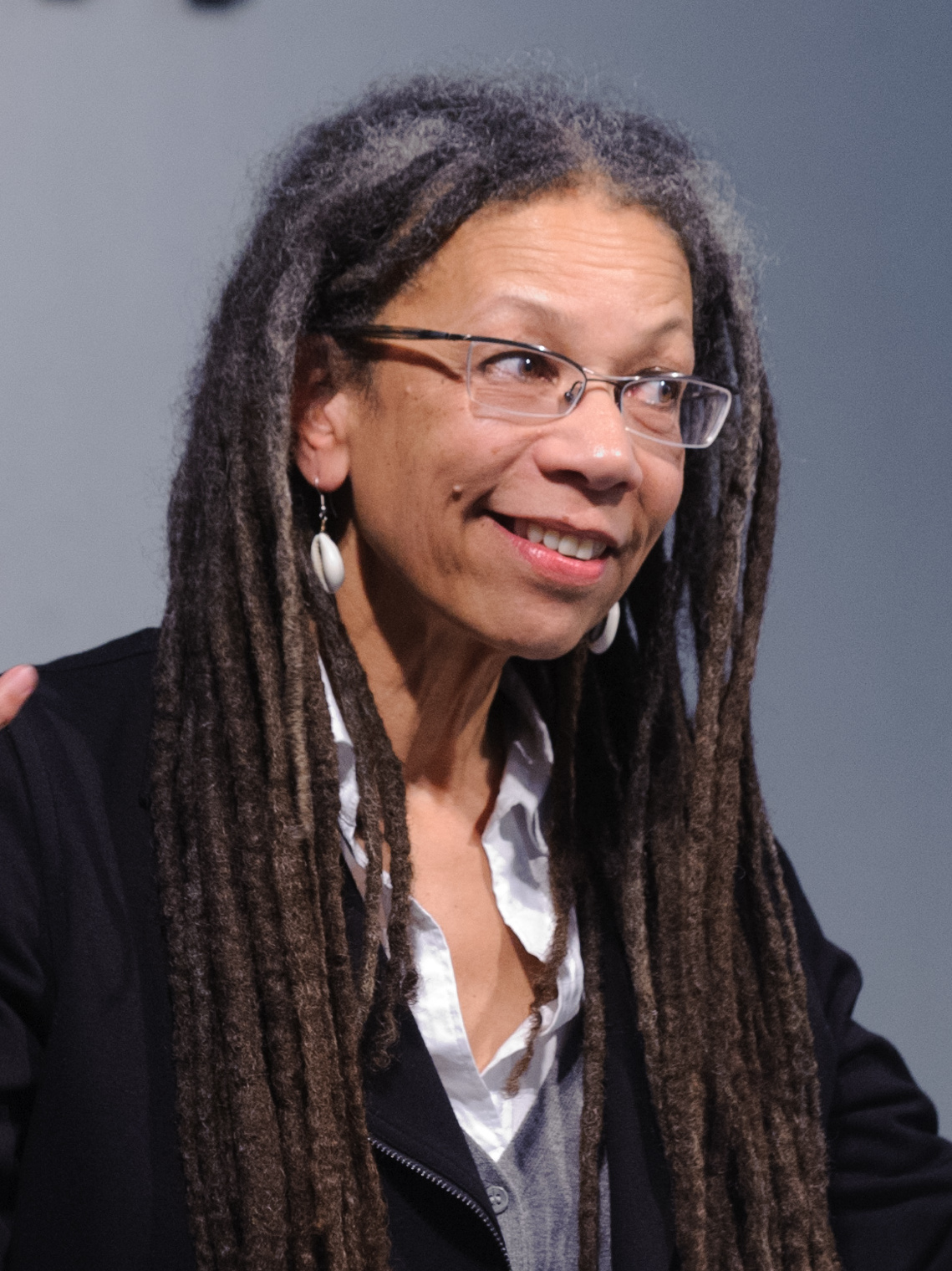
- Gilmore in 2012
- Born: April 2, 1950 (age 76); New Haven, Connecticut, U.S.
- Occupations: Scholar, Professor

Academic background
- Education: Rutgers University, New Brunswick (PhD)
- Thesis: From Military Keynesianism to Post-Keynesian Militarism: Finance Capital, Land, Labor, and Opposition in the Rising California Prison State (1998)
- Doctoral advisor: Neil Smith

Academic work
- Discipline: Geographer
- Institutions: CUNY Graduate Center, University of Southern California
- Main interests: Prison-industrial complex, Race

Ruth Wilson Gilmore (born April 2, 1950) is a prison abolitionist and prison scholar. She is the Director of the Center for Place, Culture, and Politics and professor of geography in Earth and Environmental Sciences at the Graduate Center of the City University of New York. She has made important contributions to carceral geography, the "study of the interrelationships across space, institutions and political economy that shape and define modern incarceration". She received the 2020 Lifetime Achievement Award from the American Association of Geographers.

== Early life and education ==
Ruth Wilson was born on April 2, 1950 in New Haven, Connecticut. Wilson's grandfather organised the first blue collar workers' union at Yale University. Her father, Courtland Seymour Wilson, was a tool-and-die maker for Winchester Repeating Arms Company. He was active in the machinists' union. He later was assistant dean of student affairs at Yale Medical School, then went to Yale-New Haven Hospital in the Office of Government and Community Relations.

In 1960, Wilson attended a private school in New Haven as one of its few working-class students and the first, and mostly only, African American student.

In 1968, she enrolled at Swarthmore College in Pennsylvania, where she became involved in campus activism. In 1969, Gilmore, Fania Davis (the younger sister of radical activist Angela Davis), and other students occupied the school's admissions office hoping to persuade the administration to admit more black students. Following the sudden death of the university president, white students spread false rumors that the occupying students were to blame. The next morning, Gilmore learned that her cousin, John Huggins, along with another Black Panther, Bunchy Carter, had been murdered at University of California, Los Angeles. Both Huggins and Carter were killed by members of the black nationalist US Organization.

In the wake of those events, Gilmore left Swarthmore and returned home to New Haven. She then enrolled at Yale, where she obtained a bachelor's degree in drama.

== Career ==
Gilmore earned her Ph.D. from Rutgers University in 1998 in economic geography and social theory, inspired by the work of Neil Smith. After finishing her Ph.D. she was hired as an assistant professor at University of California, Berkeley and began working on her concept of carceral geography. Carceral geography examines the relationships between landscape, natural resources, political economy, infrastructure and the policing, jailing, caging and controlling of populations. The community of academic scholars in this area is associated with the Carceral Geography Working Group (CGWG) of the Royal Geographical Society with the Institute of British Geographers. Gilmore gave a keynote address at the 2nd International Conference for Carceral Geography at the University of Birmingham, UK, on 12 December 2017.

She is a cofounder of many social justice organizations, including California Prison Moratorium Project. In 1998, she was one of the cofounders of Critical Resistance along with Angela Davis. In 2003, she cofounded Californians United for a Responsible Budget (CURB) to fight jail and prison construction and currently serves on its board.

Gilmore has been a leading scholar and speaker on topics including prisons, decarceration, racial capitalism, oppositional movements, state-making, and more. She is the author of the book Golden Gulag which was awarded the Lora Romero First Book Publication Prize for the best book in American Studies by the American Studies Association in 2008. She has also published work in venues such as Race & Class, The Professional Geographer, Social Justice, Global Lockdown: Race, Gender, and the Prison Industrial Complex, and the critical anthology The Revolution Will Not Be Funded: Beyond the Non-Profit Industrial Complex, which was edited by the Incite! collective.

== Awards and recognition ==
In 2011, Gilmore was the keynote speaker at the National Women's Studies Association annual conference in Atlanta, Georgia.

In 2012, the American Studies Association awarded her its first Angela Y. Davis prize for Public Scholarship that "recognizes scholars who have applied or used their scholarship for the "public good." This includes work that explicitly aims to educate the public, influence policies, or in other ways seeks to address inequalities in imaginative, practical, and applicable forms."

In 2014, Gilmore received the Harold M. Rose Award for Anti-Racism Research and Practice from the Association of American Geographers.

In 2017, Gilmore earned the American Studies Association Richard A. Yarborough Award. This honors scholars who demonstrate an excellence in teaching and mentoring.

In 2020, Gilmore was listed by Prospect as the seventh-greatest thinker for the COVID-19 era, with the magazine writing, "Gilmore has spent the best part of 30 years developing the field of carceral geography [...] She's helped shift the conversation about responses to crime from one of punishment to rehabilitation. As the failings of the US justice system come once again to the fore, Gilmore's radical ideas have never felt more relevant."

An Antipode (journal) documentary film featured Gilmore and key ideas of her work: geography, racial capitalism, the prison industrial complex, and abolition geographies.

In 2021, Gilmore was elected as a Member of the American Academy of Arts and Sciences.

In 2023, Gilmore was honored with a mural painted by artist and filmmaker, Jess X. Snow and local community members on the outside of the Possible Futures bookstore in New Haven, Connecticut.

== Bibliography ==
- Gilmore, Ruth Wilson, "Abolition Geography: Essays Towards Liberation". London: Verso Books, 2022. ISBN 9781839761706
- Gilmore, Ruth Wilson (2007). Golden Gulag: Prisons, Surplus, Crisis, and Opposition in Globalizing California. University of California Press. ISBN 978-0-520-22256-4.
- Clyde Adrian Woods; Ruth Wilson Gilmore, Development Arrested: The Blues and Plantation Power in the Mississippi Delta London; New York: Verso, 1998. ISBN 9781844675616
