= Labor market area =

Geographic area or region for employment statistics purposes

A labor market area is a geographic area or region defined for purposes of compiling, reporting, and evaluating employment, unemployment, workforce availability, and related topics. It can be defined as an economically integrated region within which residents can find jobs within a reasonable commuting distance or can change their employment without changing their place of residence.

Commuting flows are a primary consideration in defining and delineating labor market areas. The extent to which workers are willing and able to commute between two places indicates the degree of economic integration between those places. The division of a country into labor market areas is widely used in statistical analyses and cartographic representations. The space is subdivided in such a way that spatial and temporal comparisons between units that are as similar as possible are possible.

== United States ==
In the United States, the Bureau of Labor Statistics (BLS) maintains standard definitions of labor market areas for the purpose of standardization and to promote comparability of the labor force information used by various government programs. Definitions are updated annually, and the entire system of definitions is reevaluated once each decade based on decennial census data. BLS uses metropolitan and micropolitan statistical areas, including metropolitan divisions, as its principal basis for defining labor market areas. In New England, labor market area definitions are based on New England city and town areas rather than the county-based statistical areas used in other parts of the country. For geographic areas outside of metropolitan and micropolitan statistical areas, the BLS identifies labor market areas based primarily on commuting data, with a requirement that all components of a labor market area be contiguous.

== European Union ==
The method uses commuter flows between cities and municipalities as a characteristic. It thus enables uniform criteria, and is used in several European countries and by the Statistical Office of the European Union (Eurostat). Since settlement and land use of an area change considerably over time, the boundaries of the labor market areas must be revised regularly to ensure that they adequately reflect the current situation.

== Germany ==
In Germany, labor market areas are defined and updated by the Federal Office for Building and Regional Planning. The division of Germany into labor market areas focuses on urban-suburban relations.

== Switzerland ==
In 2018, the Swiss Federal Statistical Office (FSO) defined the labor market areas in Switzerland, a total of 101 labor market areas, which are grouped into 16 major labor market regions. In parallel, a total of ten cross-border labor market regions were designated.

== See also ==
- Labour economics
- Labor geography
- Metropolitan area
