= How the West Came to Rule =

2015 book by Alexander Anievas and Kerem Nişancıoğlu

- Author: Alexander Anievas, Kerem Nişancıoğlu
- Publisher: Pluto Press
- Publication date: June 2015
- Pages: xii+386
- ISBN: 9780745336152

How the West Came to Rule: The Geopolitical Origins of Capitalism is a 2015 nonfiction book by Alexander Anievas and Kerem Nişancıoğlu. It attempts to analyze the development of capitalism from a non-Eurocentric perspective by employing the theory of uneven and combined development. It critically engages with Political Marxism, postcolonialism, and world-systems theory.

== Background and publication ==
At the time of writing the book, Anievas was an assistant professor of political science at the University of Connecticut and Nişancıoğlu was a lecturer in international relations at SOAS University of London. The pair began work on the project after publishing a collaborative article in the journal Millennium in which they first proposed using uneven and combined development as a framework to contest Eurocentric accounts of the origins of capitalism. The book was published by Pluto Press in June 2015. In the process of researching it, the authors published two additional articles in the Review of International Studies and the European Journal of International Relations.^{:xi-xii}

== Summary ==
Holbein's The Ambassadors

The book is divided into eight chapters. In the introduction, the authors analyze the various objects portrayed in Hans Holbein the Younger's 1533 painting The Ambassadors as a way of illustrating the "distinctly geopolitical character of the origins of capitalism".^{:2-4} They go on to identify "three interrelated assumptions" about these origins that they view as Eurocentric: methodological internalism, which conceives of European development as primarily a result of internal or "endogenous" factors; historical priority, which defines "the specificity and distinctness of Western modernity" in contrast to the "East"; and linear developmentalism, which posits "universal [stages] of development" through which all societies must pass.^{:4-5}

The first chapter surveys the existing literature on the development of capitalism, focusing in particular on Political Marxist, postcolonial, and world-systems approaches. The second chapter introduces Leon Trotsky's theory of uneven and combined development as a way to overcome the perceived Eurocentrism of these past approaches.

== Reception ==
Economic historian Chris Grocott positively reviewed the book, saying it "challenges the received wisdom of capitalist development".

Sociologist Sung Hee Ru said the book "[breaks] the trite, obsolete and slanted explanations within macrohistorical sociology about the ascendancy of the West" and "profoundly challenges accounts of Europe's rise as self-generating".

Salvador Ousmane's review for the Review of African Political Economy called the book "an important introduction to a truly global history of the origins of capitalism".

Historian Henry Heller described the book as "the most comprehensive and systematic answer to [Robert Brenner]" and "a fully theorized understanding of capitalism's global origins", but wished that it had "theoretically clarified the relationship between capital accumulation in Europe and overseas exploitation".

International relations scholar Cüneyt Doğrusözlü criticized the book for lacking a rationale for which societies and historical events were excluded from its account, but said it was nevertheless "a good contribution to the research seeking to escape from the ontological singularity that lies at heart of Eurocentrism".

Novelist and philosopher Tony McKenna praised the book's account of the Ottoman Empire and the encomienda system, but criticized it for overstating the role of plantation slavery in the development of capitalism.

Ashley Smith called the book "provocative and brilliant", but criticized it for being written in an unnecessarily opaque style. He also took issue with its application of combined development to precapitalist societies, its endorsement of Dipesh Chakrabarty's postcolonial theory, and its critiques of revolutionary party-building and the centrality of the proletariat to revolution.

=== University of Nottingham symposium ===
On 7 June 2016, the Center for the Study of Social and Global Justice at the University of Nottingham's School of Politics and International Relations held a symposium on the book. Anievas and Nişancioğlu introduced their main arguments, followed by four critical responses from interlocutors, which the authors then replied to before the discussion was opened up to the floor. It was later republished by the Progress in Political Economy blog associated with the Department of Political Economy at the University of Sydney.

=== Historical Materialism symposium ===
In 2018, the journal Historical Materialism published a similar symposium where the book was critically reviewed by six authors, followed by a response from Anievas and Nişancıoğlu themselves.

== Awards ==
The book won the 2016 International Political Economy Working Group Book Prize of the British International Studies Association and the 2017 IPS Book Award of the International Studies Association.
