= Social Justice and the City =

1973 book by David Harvey

- Author: David Harvey
- Language: English
- Publisher: University of Georgia Press, Athens
- Publication date: 2009
- OCLC: 929027314

Social Justice and the City is a book published in 1973 written by the Marxist geographer David Harvey. The book is an attempt to lay out afresh the paradigm of urban geography, by bringing together the two conflicting theses of methodology and philosophy. Going against the grain of his previous book Explanation in Geography published in 1970, he argued that geography cannot remain disengaged, impartial and 'objective' at a time when urban poverty and associated ills were reigning high.

== Contents ==
The book is divided into three parts. Part I, titled "Liberal Formulations", deals with a liberal outlook on urban society and problems. However they are inadequate in dealing with the problems of the city, since they cannot bridge the gap between the ethics of morality and justice from the forces of revolutionary action. Part II, titled "Socialist Formulations", deals with a Marxist dialectical approach to understand socially complex behaviors and forces related to land, industry and urbanism. The difference between the two parts is that while the essays in Part I are ideological in the Marxist sense, the essays in Part II are ideological in the western (Non-Marxist) sense. Part III, titled "Synthesis", summarizes the significance of Marx's ontology and epistemology on his theoretical formulations, and ends with a review of urbanism and right to the city as theorized by Henri Lefebvre.

== Publication history ==
Social Justice and the City was first published by the Johns Hopkins University Press in 1973. After being out of print for a long time, it was republished by the University of Georgia Press in 2009, after adding Harvey's influential essay "The Right to the City" published previously in the New Left Review.

== Main arguments ==
In Part I, Harvey begins by saying that no discipline has theories and propositions about the city itself and he was setting himself up to examine some theories himself. According to him, urban planning was a fraught territory because it was at the interface of a spatial and social analysis. Until social scientists found a metalanguage to talk about this interface in a meaningful way, his suggestion was that social scientists should devise temporary theories for understanding the city, in ways that could bring together the social processes and the spatial form. In Part II, Harvey's focus is on studying the income inequality among richer and poorer neighborhoods of a city and its implications for the spatial form of the city. He finds out that generally, jobs are located in suburban areas whereas low-income housing, where most poor residents stay, is always located in the inner core of the city. The transport costs are also a deterrent for the poor. He writes that the redistribution of real income has technological fixes, but in the long term one will have to engage with political processes to avert "moving towards a state of greater inequality and greater injustice (94)."

The tone of Part II is radically different from Part I. He asserts that a paradigm shift is required in geographic thought. Even though he was one of the proponents of the quantitative revolution, he said that pursuing that would only have diminishing returns. He puts forth the argument that in order to have a revolutionary theory in geography, one needs to take the Marxist path. Through a deep and profound critique of our existent analytical concepts and by pushing for new theory that will stand the ground of empirical reality, Harvey says revolutionary thought is possible. Of course it needs to be tempered by commitment to revolutionary practice.

In Part III David Harvey offers some concluding remarks. He takes stock of Marx's ontology and epistemology, and through each step he investigates how it influences the analysis of a complex concept like urbanism (287). In the new edition of the book Harvey's essay "The Right to the City" is also included.

== Critical reception ==
Kevin R Cox, while reviewing it for the Geographical Analysis says that Harvey emphasizes "that social science laws have a contingent rather than universal status." Therefore, the solutions that the Harvey offers in the second part of the book lies in dialectical materialism. According to Cox, Harvey's main strength lies in complicating the theory of exploitation with regard to surplus value. He writes, "(Harvey) describes a "global form of economic imperialism" by which the populations of developed countries appropriate surplus value from less developed countries."

Richard R Morill writing for the Annals of the Association of American Geographers, writes that the draw of Harvey's book is in his use of Marx's methodological approach of the study of human society in practice. This entails understanding the transformations by which human actions "fashion history rather than be fashioned by it." However he is not convinced that the socialist reordering of the city, something that Harvey advocates, will solve the problems of the capitalist order. He writes that "I am pulled most of the way by this revolutionary analysis, but I cannot make the final leap that our task is no longer to find truth, but to create and accept a particular truth."

R E Pahl writes in Urban Studies that the main draw of Harvey's book is in the third section called Urbanism and the City. According to him, the lasting contribution of this section is in the way Harvey defines urbanism—it is the processes in the contemporary city by which the products of surplus value is converted to surplus labor.
