= Labor geography =

Labor geography is a subdiscipline of human geography and economic geography that examines the spatial relationships and geographic trends within labor and political systems.

== See also ==
- Marxist geography
- Labor market area
