= Don Mitchell (geographer) =

American geographer (born 1961)

Don Mitchell (born 1961) is professor of human geography at Uppsala University and Distinguished Professor Emeritus in the geography department at the Maxwell School, Syracuse University.

== Education and career ==
From an academic household in California, he is a graduate of San Diego State University (1987) and Pennsylvania State University (1989), as well as receiving his PhD from Rutgers University in 1992, working with Neil Smith. He taught at the University of Colorado Boulder before joining Syracuse University in the late 1990s.

In 1998, he became a MacArthur Fellow, and in 2008 a Guggenheim Fellow. He was awarded the Retzius Medal from the Swedish Society for Anthropology and Geography in 2012.

== Scholarship ==
Considered an influential Marxist scholar, he is best known for his work on cultural theory, showing how landscapes embody historical links to struggle, oppression, and the unacknowledged labor involved in their creation and maintenance. He has applied this to the history of immigrant labor in California's agricultural landscapes, privatized public spaces, and public parks where homeless people are threatened or evicted.

Mitchell has written extensively on homelessness in the United States. In his 2020 book Mean Streets, he examines the structural causes of homelessness and the role capitalism has played in creating and exacerbating it. He posits that as racist and unjust as U.S. capitalism was during the Keynesian period following the New Deal, social welfare programs mitigated its harshest excesses, a situation which changed during the transition to a neoliberal economy starting in the 1970s and accelerating under the Reagan administration. He argues: "The world can be organized such that it doesn’t simultaneously produce the people we call homeless and the thinking that we have to get rid of them."

== Books ==
=== As author ===
- Mean Streets: Homelessness, Public Space, and the Limits of Capital (2020). University of Georgia Press.
- They Saved the Crops: Labor, Landscape, and the Struggle over Industrial Farming in Bracero-Era California (2012). University of Georgia Press.
- The People’s Property? Power, Politics, and the Public (with Lynn Staeheli, 2008). New York: Routledge.
- The Right to the City: Social Justice and the Fight for Public Space (2003). New York: Guilford Press.
- Cultural Geography: A Critical Introduction (2000). Blackwell Publishing. ISBN 1-55786-892-1
- The Lie of the Land: Migrant Workers and the California Landscape (1996). University of Minnesota Press.

=== As editor ===
- Justice, Power and the Political Landscape (ed. with Kenneth Olwig, 2009). London: Routledge.
