= Carceral geography =

Carceral geography is a field of human geography that explores “carceral spaces”, which include prisons, concentration camps, immigration detention centers, black sites, and other spaces where people are confined. Carceral geographers may study the design of prison spaces and how these spaces are experienced by imprisoned people and surrounding communities. They also study changes in carceral spaces over time, intersecting with historical geography.

Geographers give attention to the politics and placement of prison facilities, and how carceral practices are shaped by settler colonialism and racial capitalism.

== History ==
The first papers “squarely in the field” of carceral geography were published in the late 1990s or early 2000s, with contributions by Teresa Dirsuweit, Chris Philo, and Ruth Wilson Gilmore. In 2015, carceral geography was a “new and fast-developing field”, and in 2021 it was “firmly on the map” of research in human geography with several different theoretical orientations within the field.

Scholarship in carceral geography draws on work by Michel Foucault, Erving Goffman, and Giorgio Agamben. It also builds on earlier work in criminology and prison sociology, though where these fields had emphasized time as a mode of understanding imprisonment rates or prisoner experience, carceral geography emphasizes the study of space for understanding these topics. The field also draws on earlier studies in mental health geographies.

Building on Foucalt's work, especially Discipline and Punish (1975), carceral geographers explore how the carceral might permeate life outside of prisons to exert low-level control of people in various public space along a ‘continuum of carcerality’.

Ruth Wilson Gilmore's 2007 book Golden Gulag: Prisons, Surplus, Crisis, and Opposition in Globalizing California was an important book in the field, detailing the growth of the prison industrial complex in California beginning in the 19th century.

=== Abolition geography ===
Later scholarship in carceral geography has taken an abolitionist turn, exploring futures without police and prisons.

Abolition geography engages with social movements that work to make police and prisons obsolete by helping to imagine other political and social structures. This field of study challenges orthodox relationships to property under settler colonialism and racial capitalism. A central question explored by this field is whether the state should be instrumental in abolishing the prison industrial complex, or whether grassroots organizations should enact change without relying on the state—or in opposition to it.

The field draws on concepts like abolition democracy, originally described by W.E.B. Du Bois as the black-led reconstruction-era government overthrown by white southerners and northern capitalists in his book Black Reconstruction In America (1935). Scholars in the black radical tradition, such as Angela Davis and Ruth Wilson Gilmore have further developed abolition democracy as an imagined future without prisons and police.

Abolition ecology is another related field, likewise interrogating human relationship with space and the environment under racial capitalism and settler colonialism while imagining a future abolition democracy.
