= Maarten Hajer =

Dutch political scientist

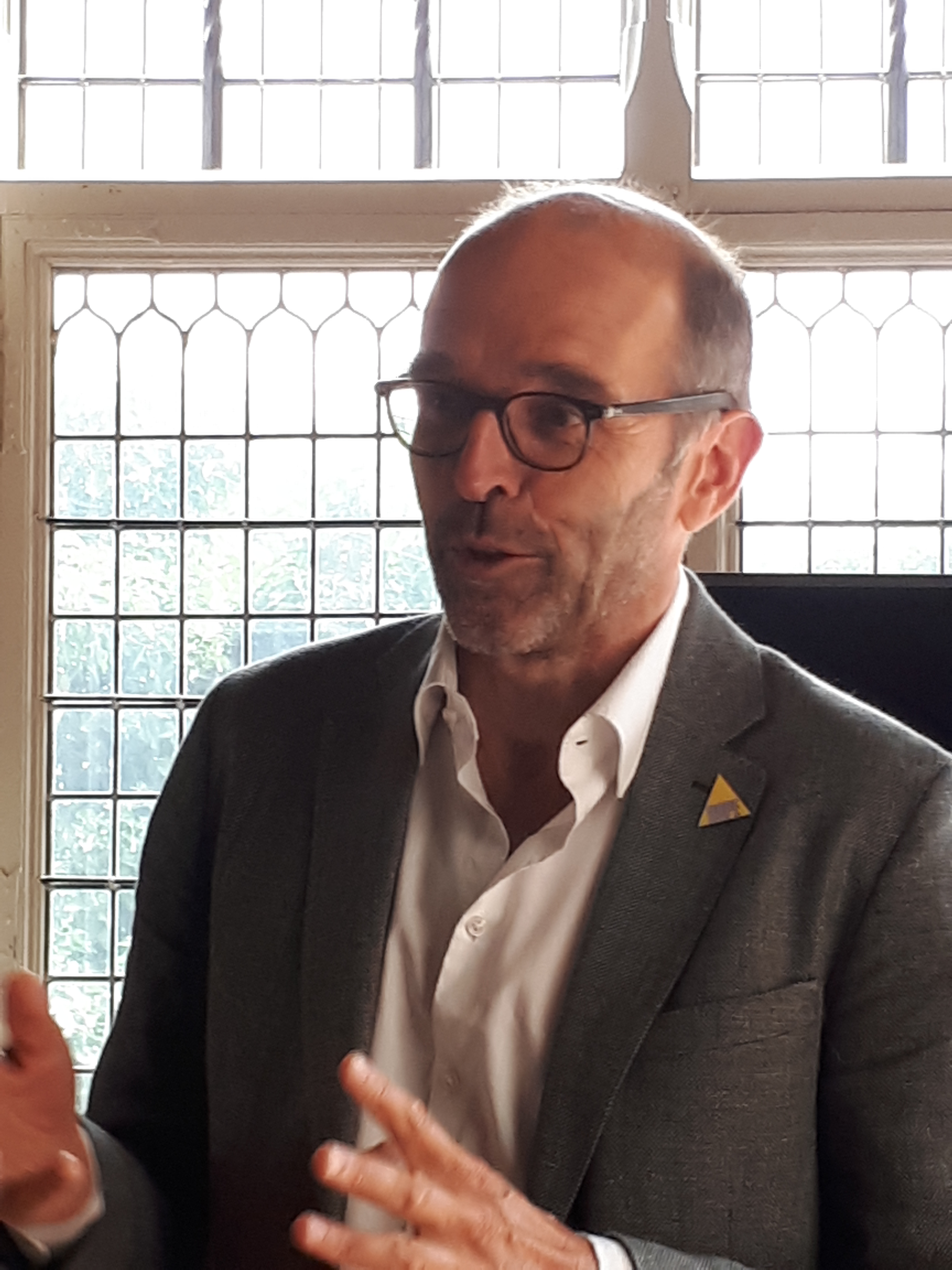
- Hajer in 2018
- Born: Maarten Allard Hajer; 8 August 1962 (age 63); Groningen, Netherlands
- Occupations: Political scientist, urban planner
- Known for: Director of the Netherlands Environmental Assessment Agency (2008–2015)

Maarten Allard Hajer (born 8 August 1962) is a Dutch political scientist and regional planner. Since 1 October 2015, Hajer has been Faculty Professor of Urban Futures at Utrecht University, where he leads the Urban Futures Studio.

He was a Professor of Public Policy at the University of Amsterdam between 1998 and 2015 and Director of the Netherlands Environmental Assessment Agency (PBL) from 1 October 2008 to 1 October 2015. In September 2014, Hajer was appointed the Chief Curator of IABR–2016–THE NEXT ECONOMY, the 7th edition of the International Architecture Biennale Rotterdam.

== Career ==
Hajer obtained his PhD in politics from Oxford University. In the early 1990s, he was employed by the University of Leiden as researcher at the Centre for Law and Public Policy. Between 1993 and 1996, he was a member of the scientific staff at LMU Munich, working with sociologist Ulrich Beck. Following that, he became senior researcher at the Dutch Scientific Council for Government Policy (WRR), where he was project coordinator of a report on spatial development politics.

Besides being a scientist, Hajer has held a number of public appointments. As a member of the VROM-raad (the VROM-council of the Dutch Ministry of Housing, Spatial Planning and the Environment) he was responsible for the advisory document on climate change as a structural spatial issue De Hype voorbij – klimaatverandering als structureel ruimtelijk vraagstuk (VROM-raad advice 060, 2007). In addition, he was a member of a programme committee on the Dutch Labour Party’s manifesto (led by Willem Witteveen). Furthermore, Hajer was a columnist for the Dutch newspapers Het Parool and Staatscourant, and served as member of the jury for the Spinoza Prize, the Dutch EO Weijers competition for landscape architecture, and for EUROPAN 9, the European award for young architects.

== Works ==
=== Author ===
- Smart about Cities: Visualising the Challenge for 21st Century Urbanism, with Ton Dassen. nai010/pbl publishers (2014), ISBN 978-94-6208-148-2
- Authoritative Governance: Policy Making in the Age of Mediatization. Oxford (2011) ISBN 0-19-959567-4
- In search of the New Public Domain, with Arnold Reijndorp. NAi (2002) ISBN 90-5662-201-3
- The Politics of Environmental Discourse. Oxford (1995) ISBN 0-19-829333-X

=== Editor ===
- Deliberative Policy Analysis – Understanding Governance in the Network Society, with Henk Wagenaar. Cambridge (2003) ISBN 0-521-53070-9
- Living with Nature, with Frank Fischer. Oxford (1999) ISBN 0-19-829509-X
