= Settlement geography =

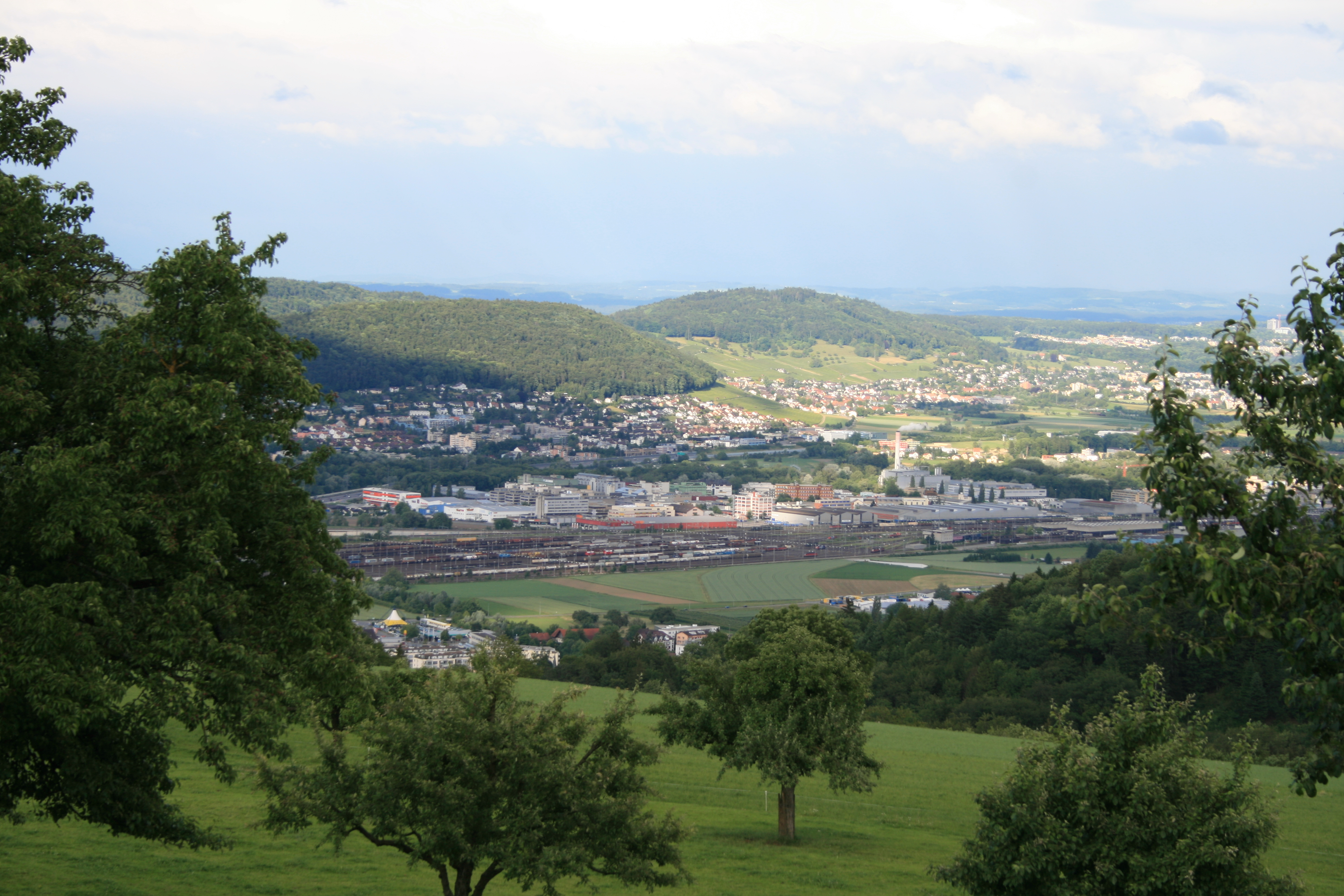
The Swiss Limmat Valley, a periurban settlement structure.

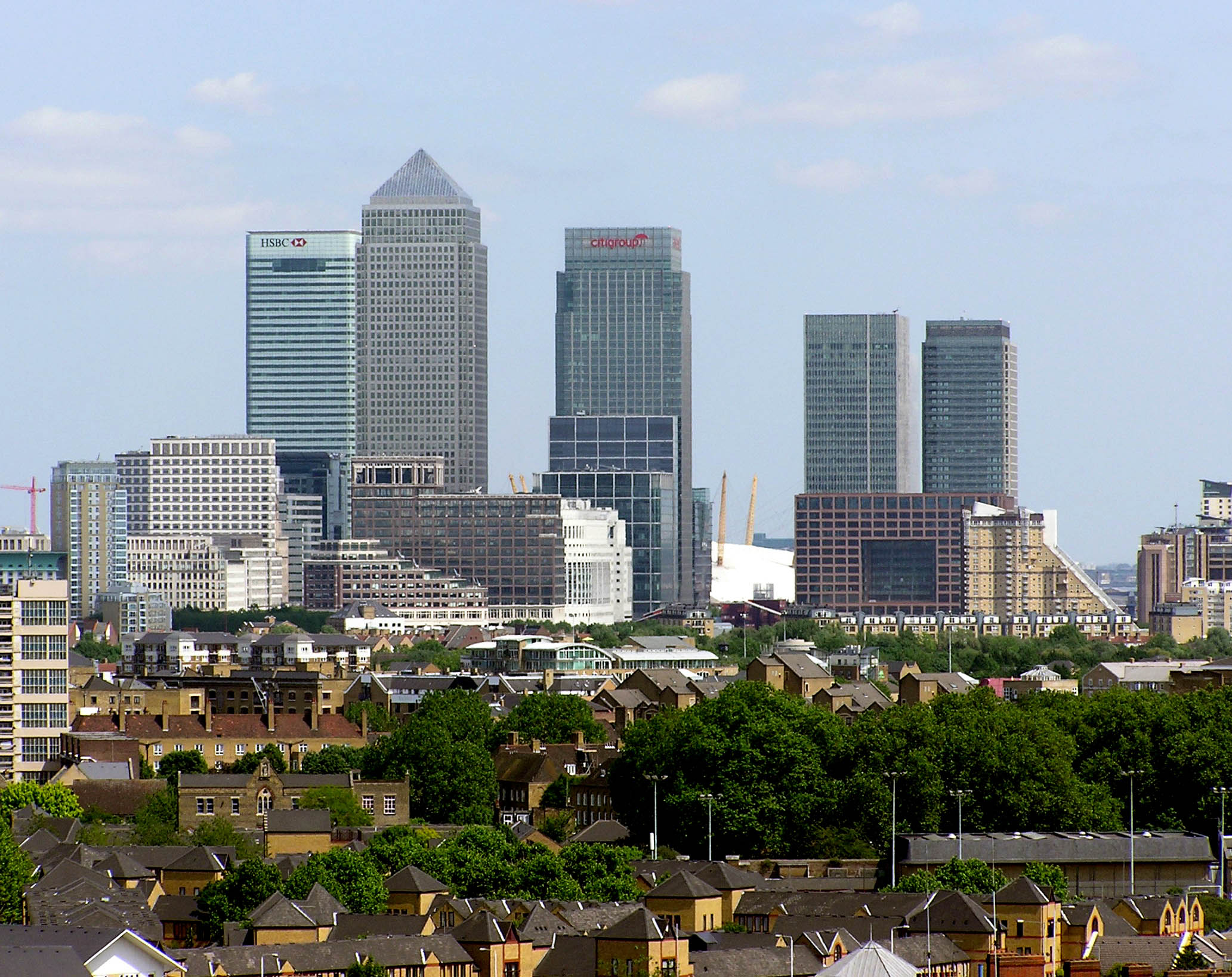
City of London

Settlement geography is a branch of human geography that investigates the Earth's surface's part settled by humans. According to the United Nations' Vancouver Declaration on Human Settlements (1976), "human settlements means the totality of the human community – whether city, town or village – with all the social, material, organizational, spiritual and cultural elements that sustain it."

== Classification ==
Traditionally, it belongs to cultural geography and is divided into the geography of urban settlements (cities and towns) and rural settlements (e.g. villages and hamlets). Thereby, settlements are mostly seen as elements of the cultural landscape that developed over time. Apart from Australia, Europe and India, the term is actually rarely used in English-speaking geography. One of the last English books on settlement geography was published by Cambridge University Press in the 1990s. However, it is a traditional and current branch in many other countries (e.g., German Siedlungsgeographie, French Geographie de l'habitat, Italian Geografia insediativa, Polish Geografia osadnictwa).

== Actuality ==
Due to processes of urban sprawl such as counter urbanization, peri-urbanization or postsuburbanization the existing dichotomy between the urban and the rural is losing importance, especially in industrialized countries and newly industrialized countries. This point of view is already represented by many planning strategies such as unified settlement planning. Hence, an integrative geography of settlements that considers the urban and the rural settlements as a continuum is regaining the importance lost during the 20th century. Further it is used in prehistoric, historic and present-focusing geographic research.

== Definitions ==
Referring to Stone (1960), settlement geography is

the description and analysis of the distribution of buildings by which people attach themselves to the land. Further, that the geography of settling designate the action of erecting buildings in order to occupy an area temporarily or permanently. It should be understood that buildings are one tangible expression of man-land relationships and that specification of this focus assumes study may be at any scale from quite general to most specific; there is no restriction to large-scale study of individual building plans or architectural details. Buildings are simply one representation of the process of people living in an area they are a mappable division of the landscape to which attention needs direction.

With respect to Stone's definition, Jordan (1966) emphasizes that settlement geography not exclusively investigates the distributions, but even more the structures, processes and interactions between settlements and its environment (such as soil, geomorphology, economy or society), which produce them. More recently, however,

the study of settlement has evolved into the interaction of humans with the physical and ecological world. This more holistic study is concerned with sustainability and seeks to better understand the present landscape and plan the future.

In sum, settlement geography describes and explains the settlements' location, substance, form and structure, as well as the functions and processes that produced them over time (Genesis, from Greek γέννησις, "origin, birth" or historical development). As an applied science, it projects future settlement development and contributes to the sustainable development of human-environmental systems.

== See also ==
- Circles of Sustainability
- Human settlement
- Sustainable development
- UN-HABITAT
- Urban geography
