= Neil Smith (geographer) =

Scottish geographer and academic (1954–2012)

Neil Robert Smith
- Born: 18 July 1954; Leith, Scotland
- Died: 29 September 2012 (aged 58); New York City, United States

Academic background
- Education: University of St. Andrews (B.Sc., 1977); Johns Hopkins University (Ph.D., 1982)
- Doctoral advisor: David Harvey

Academic work
- Discipline: Geography, Anthropology
- Doctoral students: Ruth Wilson Gilmore, Don Mitchell (geographer)

Neil Robert Smith (18 July 1954 – 29 September 2012) was a Scottish geographer and Marxist academic. He was Distinguished Professor of Anthropology and Geography at the Graduate Center of the City University of New York, and winner of numerous awards, including the Globe Book Award of the Association of American Geographers. Smith is known for his analysis of gentrification and his influential rent-gap theory.

== Background ==
Smith was born in 1954 in Leith, Scotland. He was one of four children of a schoolteacher, and spent most of his childhood in Dalkeith, southeast of Edinburgh. He attended King's Park Primary School and Dalkeith High School.

Smith earned his 1st class BSc from the University of St. Andrews in 1977 (with a year at the University of Pennsylvania, 1974–1975), and his PhD from Johns Hopkins University in 1982, where his advisor was noted Marxist geographer David Harvey.

He took up a tenure-track position at Columbia University in New York (1982–1986), but Columbia closed its Geography Department and he moved to Rutgers University in New Jersey (1986–2000). At Rutgers he was Chair of the Geography Department (1991–94) and a senior fellow at the Center for the Critical Analysis of Contemporary Culture. From 2004 to 2005, he was the Wayne Morse Chair of Law and Politics, established in honor of the late American Senator, at the University of Oregon.

Smith lived in New York, latterly splitting his time between New York and Toronto, Canada, where he owned a house with his partner, Deb Cowen. From 2008 to 2012 he held a 20 percent appointment as Sixth Century Professor of Geography and Social Theory at the University of Aberdeen in his native Scotland.

He was known for cultivating a new generation of critical geographers. Though an advocate for a stronger feminist approach to the practice of critical geography, some female students characterized his behavior towards them as sexual harassment, as "more than one woman student left departments Neil taught in because of his unwelcome and persistent advances."

== Scholarship ==
Smith's research explored the broad intersections between space, nature, social theory, and history. His dissertation at Johns Hopkins University was supposed to have been on urban processes, but was in fact a major theoretical treatise that became the book Uneven Development: Nature, Capital and the Production of Space (1984). In this major work of social theory, Smith borrowed Henri Lefebvre's theory of the social production of space and proposed that uneven spatial development is intrinsic to capital markets: capitalism needs to "produce" unevenness to keep accumulating and sustain itself.

Smith is credited with theories about the gentrification of the inner city as an economic process propelled by urban land prices and city land speculation (aimed at closing the rent gap between the actual and the most profitable use of the land), rather than by cultural preferences for living in the city. He explored this in his seminal article Toward a Theory of Gentrification: A Back to the City Movement by Capital, not People (1979).

Smith's curiosity about why such critical study of space and place came so late to the discipline of geography lead to his study of early 20th-century geographer Isaiah Bowman and the book American Empire: Roosevelt's Geographer and the Prelude to Globalization (2003), which traced America's rise to global power through geographical ignorance. The book won several awards, including the Henry Adams Prize of the Society for History in the Federal Government. Smith's critique of American-led, capitalist neoliberalism was further developed in The Endgame of Globalization (2005).

== Recognition ==
- Los Angeles Times Book Award, Biography, 2004
- Henry Adams Book Prize, Society of Historians in Federal Government, 2004
- Globe Award for Public Understanding of Geography, Association of American Geographers, 2004
- Distinguished Scholarship Honors, Association of American Geographers, 2000
- John Simon Guggenheim Fellowship, 1995–1996
- Board of Trustees Research Fellowship Award, Rutgers University, 1988–89
- The Scottish Geographical Medal, awarded by the Royal Scottish Geographical Society, 1977
- Robert Lincoln McNeil Scholar, University of Pennsylvania, 1974–75

== Death ==
Smith died on 29 September 2012, from liver and kidney failure. He was survived by his three siblings; his partner, geographer Deborah Cowen, his former wife, geographer Cindi Katz, and his daughter Isabella DeRiso.

== Cultural references ==
The Edinburgh-based band New Urban Frontier took their name from the title of Smith's book The New Urban Frontier: Gentrification and the Revanchist City. Their 2015 album Game of Capital also commemorates him.

== Publications ==
Books

- 2009. Democracy, States, and the Struggle for Global Justice. Routledge (edited with Heather Gautney, Omar Dahbour and Ashley Dawson).
- 2006 The Politics of Public Space (with Setha Low). Routledge.
- 2006 La Produccion de la Naturaleza; La Produccion del Espacio. Mexico City: Sistema Universidad Abierta, Universidad Nacional Autonoma de Mexico, 2006
- 2005 The Endgame of Globalization. Routledge.
- 2005 Capital Financiero, Propiedad Inmobiliaria y Cultura. MACBA & Publicacions de la Universitat Autonoma de Barcelona, Barcelona (with David Harvey)
- 2003 American Empire: Roosevelt's Geographer and the Prelude to Globalization. University of California Press (winner, Los Angeles Times Book Prize for Biography).
- 2000 Globalización: Transformaciones urbanas, precarización social y discriminación de género (with Cindi Katz). Nueva Grafica, S.A.L. La Cuesta, La Laguna.
- 1996 The New Urban Frontier: Gentrification and the Revanchist City. Routledge.
- 1994 Geography and Empire: Critical Studies in the History of Geography (edited with Anne Godlewska). Basil Blackwell, Oxford.
- 1986 Gentrification of the City (edited with Peter Williams). George Allen and Unwin, London.
- 1984. Basil Blackwell. 2nd ed. 1990, 3rd Ed. University of Georgia Press, Athens, GA, 2008; London: Verso, 2010. (Translated and published as Desenvolvimento Desigual, Editora Bertrand Brasil, Rio de Janeiro, 1988)
- 1977. Geography, Social Welfare and Underdevelopment. University of St. Andrews (edited with Malcolm Forbes and Michael Kershaw).

Articles

- 2011 “Ten Years After,” Geographical Journal 177,
- 2011 “Uneven Development Redux,” New Political Economy 16: 261–265.
- 2010 “’Martial Law in the Streets of Toronto’: G20, Security and State Violence,” Human Geography 3.3:29–46,
- 2010 “The Revolutionary Imperative,” Antipode 41: 50–65.
- 2009 “After Geopolitics? From the Geopolitical Social to Geoeconomics,” Antipode 40: 2–48 (with Deborah Cowen)
- 2008 “The Shock Doctrine: a discussion,” Society and Space 26:582–595 (with Naomi Klein)
- 2008 "Review Essay: David Harvey: A Critical Reader,” Progress in Human Geography, 32,1:147–155.
- 2007 “Gentrification, Displacement, and Tourism in Santa Cruz de Tenerife,” Urban Geography, 28, 2007, 276–298 (with Luz Marina García Herrera and Miguel Angel Mejías Vera)
- 2007 “Another Revolution is Possible: Foucault, ethics and politics,” Environment and Planning D: Society and Space, 25:191–193
- 2006 “Nature as Accumulation Strategy”, Socialist Register, 16–36
- 2006 “The Endgame of Globalization”, Political Geography, 25,1:1–14.
- 2003 “Global Executioner”, The South Atlantic Quarterly, 105,1: 55–69.
- 2003 “Neo-Critical Geography, Or, The Flat Pluralist World of Business Class”, Antipode, 37, 5: 887–899.
- 2003 “After Iraq: Vulnerable imperial stasis”, Radical Philosophy, 127, September/October: 2–7.
- 2003 “After the American Lebensraum: ‘Empire’, Empire, and Globalization”, Interventions, 5:2:249-270.
- 2003 "Geographies of Substance" in Envisioning Human Geography, Paul Cloke, Philip Crang, and Mark Goodwin, eds.
- 2003 "Gentrification Generalized: From Local Anomaly to Urban 'Regeneration' as Global Urban Strategy" in Frontiers of Capital: Ethnographic Reflections on the New Economy, M. Fisher and G. Downey, eds.
- 2003 "Generalizing Gentrification" in Retours en ville, Catherine Bidou, Daniel Hiernaux, and Helene Riviere D'Arc, eds. Paris: Descartes & Cie. January.
- 2002 "Scale Bending" in Rethinking Scale, E. Sheppard and R. McMaster, eds.
- 2002 "Remaking Scale: Competition and Cooperation in Prenational and Postnational Europe" in State/Spaces.
- 2002 "Scales of Terror: The Manufacturing of Nationalism and the War for U.S. Globalism", pp. 97–108 in After the World Trade Center, Sharon Zukin and Michael Sorkin, eds. New York: Routledge.
- 2002 "New Globalism, New Urbanism: Gentrification as Global Urban Strategy", Antipode 34 (3): 434–57. Reprinted in "Neo-Liberal Urbanism", Neil Brenner and Nik Theodore, eds., Malden, MA: Basil Blackwell.
- 2002 "Ashes and Aftermath", Studies in Political Economy 67. Spring, pp. 7–12.
- 2002 "Ashes and Aftermath", Philosophy & Geography 5 (1): 9–12.
- 2002 "Kontinuum New York", pp. 72–86 in Die Stadt Als Event, Regina Bittner, ed. Dessau, Bauhaus.
- 1987 "'Academic War Over the Field of Geography': The Elimination of Geography at Harvard, 1947–1951," Annals of the Association of American Geographers 77 (2): 155-172. doi: 10.1111/j.1467-8306.1987.tb00151.x
- 1979 "Toward a Theory of Gentrification: A Back to the City Movement by Capital, not People". Journal of the American Planning Association 45 (4): 538–48. doi:10.1080/01944367908977002
