= Critical geography =

Variant of social science that seeks to interpret and change the world

Critical geography is theoretically informed geographical scholarship that promotes social justice, liberation, and leftist politics. Critical geography is also used as an umbrella term for Marxist, feminist, postmodern, poststructural, queer, left-wing, and activist geography.

Critical geography is one variant of critical social science and the humanities that adopts Marx’s thesis to interpret and change the world. Fay (1987) defines contemporary critical science as the effort to understand oppression in a society and use this understanding to promote societal change and liberation. Agger (1998) identifies a number of features of critical social theory practiced in fields like geography, which include: a rejection of positivism; an endorsement of the possibility of progress; a claim for the structural dynamics of domination; an argument that dominance is derived from forms of false consciousness, ideology, and myth; a faith in the agency of everyday change and self-transformation and an attendant rejection of determinism; and a rejection of revolutionary expediency.

== Origin ==
The term 'critical geography' has been in use since at least 1749, when the book Geography reformed: a new system of general geography, according to an Accurate Analysis of the science in four parts dedicated a chapter to the topic titled "of Critical Geography." This book proposed critical geography as the process by which geographers identify errors in the work of others and fix them in later publications.

"This Species calls all Geography to an Account, and examines into the Accuracy of the Names, and Situation of Places, as well as the Division of Countries; pointing out the Errors and Defects in each, and proposing Remedies, chiefly with a view to improve and rectify Geography, in order to bring it to its desired Perfection."

— Edward Cave (Note: While Cave published the "Geography reformed: a new system of general geography, according to an accurate analysis of the science in four parts", how much he wrote or edited is unclear. Other authors are not given within the text.),

In this 1749 book, Cave uses examples of Eratosthenes, Hipparchus, and Ptolemy all correcting the errors of their predecessor before publishing their own work.

In the 1970s, so-called "radical geographers" in the Anglo-American world began using the framework of critical geography to transform the scope of the discipline of geography in response to societal issues such as civil rights, environmental pollution, and war. Peet (2000) provides an overview of the evolution of radical and critical geography. The mid- to late-1970s saw ascending critiques of the quantitative revolution and the adoption of Marxist approaches through Marxist geography. The 1980s were marked by fissures between humanistic, feminist and Marxist streams, and a reversal of structural excess. In the late 1980s, critical geography emerged and gradually became a self-identified field.

Although closely related, critical geography and radical geography are not interchangeable. Critical geography has two crucial departures from radical geography: (1) a rejection of the structural excess of Marxism, in accordance with the post-modern turn; and (2) an increasing interest in culture and representation, in contrast to radical geography's focus on the economy. Peet (2000) notices a rapprochement between critical and radical geography after heated debate in the 1990s. Nevertheless, Castree (2000) posits that critical and radical geography entail different commitments. He contends that the eclipse of radical geography indicates the professionalization and academicization of Left geography, and therefore worries about the loss of the "radical" tradition.

== Common themes ==
As a consequence of the post-modern turn, critical geography doesn't have a unified commitment. Hubbard, Kitchin, Bartley, and Fuller (2002) asserts that critical geography has a diverse epistemology, ontology, and methodology, and does not have a distinctive theoretical identity. Nonetheless, Blomley (2006) identifies six common themes of critical geography, encompassing:

1. A commitment to theory and a rejection of empiricism. Critical geographers consciously deploy theories of some form, but they draw from a variety of theoretical wells, such as political economy, governmentality, feminism, anti-racism, and anti-imperialism.
2. A commitment to reveal the processes that produce inequalities. Critical geographers seek to unveil power, uncover inequality, expose resistance, and cultivate liberating politics and social changes.
3. An emphasis on representation as a means of domination and resistance. A common focus of critical geography is to study how representations of space sustain power; or on the contrary, how representations of space can be used to challenge power.
4. An optimistic faith in the power of critical scholarship. Critical geographers believe that scholarship can be used to resist dominant representations, and that scholars can undo said domination and help free the oppressed. There exists an implicit confidence in the power of critical scholarship to reach the uninformed, and in the capacities of people to defeat alienation by means of reflexive self-education.
5. A commitment to progressive practices. Critical geographers want to make a difference through praxis. They claim to be united with social movements and activists with commitments to social justice. The actual relationship between critical geography and activism has been much debated.
6. An understanding of space as a critical tool. Critical geographers pay special attention to how spatial arrangements and representations can be used to produce oppression and inequality. Critical geographers identify to varying degrees how space can be used as both a veil and tool of power.

== Critiques ==
There are many criticisms of critical geography. Physical geographers and those who embraced the new techniques developed during the quantitative revolution are often the target of criticisms from critical geographers. These geographers argue that critical geographers argue from a place of ignorance on quantitative geography. The popularity of critical geography, and the resulting decline in quantitative methods, is argued to be in large part due to the difficulty of the subject matter causing people to "jump ship." Further, some believe that critical geographers are antiscience.

Many quantitative geographers acknowledge the early criticisms pointed out by critical geographers and contend that new technology and techniques have addressed these criticisms and that they no longer apply.

There has also been relatively limited discussion over the shared commitments of critical geographers, with a few exceptions such as Harvey (2000). The question such as "what are geographers critical of", and "to what end" needs to be answered. Barnes (2002) comments that critical geographers are better at providing explanatory diagnoses than offering anticipatory-utopian imaginations to reconfigure the world.

Some critical geographers are concerned with the institutionalization of critical geography. Even though critical geographers conceive themselves as rebels and outsiders, critical thinking has become prevalent in geography. Critical geography is now situated at the very heart of the discipline of geography. Some see institutionalization as a natural result of the analytical strength and insights of critical geography, while others fear that institutionalization has entailed cooptation. The question is whether critical geography still holds its commitment to political change.

Further, as critical geography is practiced across the world, the insights of critical geographers outside the Anglophone world should be better acknowledged. In this regard, Mizuoka et al. (2005) offered an overview of Japanese critical geography praxis since the 1920s. In addition, critical geography should also forge stronger linkage with critical scholars in other disciplines.

== See also ==
- Carceral geography
