= Los Angeles School =

The Los Angeles School of Urbanism is an academic movement in geography which emerged during the mid-1980s, loosely based at UCLA and the University of Southern California, which centers urban analysis on Los Angeles, California. The Los Angeles School redirects urban study away from notions of concentric zones and an ecological approach, used by the Chicago School during the 1920s, towards social polarization and fragmentation, hybridity of culture, subcultural analysis, and auto-driven sprawl.

== History ==
The first published identification of the Los Angeles (L.A.) School as such was by Mike Davis in his popular urban history of Los Angeles, City of Quartz (1990). According to Davis, the school emerged informally during the mid-1980s when an eclectic variety of neo-Marxist scholars began publishing a series of articles and books dealing exclusively with Los Angeles. During the school's formation, Davis cautiously estimated that the school had about twenty members scattered throughout Southern California and beyond, with some members purportedly residing as far away as Frankfurt, Germany. Much of the work published by L.A. School members during the 1980s and early 1990s garnered considerable attention. However, while some members (e.g. Edward Soja and Mike Davis) became household names in urban theory, there was little consciousness of the school as its own entity, especially outside of Los Angeles. This changed in 1998, with the publication of an article by Michael J. Dear and Steven Flusty, which explicitly argued for the existence of a distinct L.A. School of Urbanism, of which its various theories, concepts, and empirical works could be pooled together to constitute a radical new conception of ‘postmodern urbanism.’ After Dear and Flusty's publication, Dear popularized the school through the production of a series of articles and books, including a full-length edited volume comparing the L.A. School to the Chicago School. Though much of the work of the L.A. School is still widely read in urban studies, the school's membership has declined substantially in recent years. At a retirement party for Soja in 2008 at which many purported members were present, only Michael J. Dear appeared to be willing to envisage the school's continued existence. This situation reflects the vital conceptual disagreements between members of the LA School, and especially between Dear and the other members.

== Members ==
There is no official list of present or historic members of the Los Angeles School of Urbanism. Some thinkers who are commonly considered members include:

- Michael Dear
- Mike Davis
- Allen J Scott
- Edward W. Soja
- Michael Storper
- Jennifer Wolch

Additionally, students of these scholars have continued the scholarly tradition of looking at L.A. as "urbanists," including:

- Stefano Bloch
- Steven Flusty
- Walter Nichols
- Susan A. Phillips

== Ideas ==
The L.A. School has no official doctrine, and there is great diversity in the works of its various members. Nevertheless, there are several influences, themes, and concepts which are relatively consistent in the school's scholarship. Perhaps the central characteristic of the thought of the L.A. School is a sustained focus on Los Angeles in both empirical and theoretical work, often with the underlying claim that L.A. is the paradigmatic American metropolis of the 20th and 21st centuries. More than this, the L.A. School poses a challenge to, what many members see as, the dominant Chicago School of Urbanism. While the Chicago School presents a modernist theory of cities as based on social darwinist struggles for urban space, the Los Angeles School proposes a postmodern or postfordist vision. While not all members of the L.A. School identify as postmodernists, and in fact some (e.g. Mike Davis) are against the very concept, a focus on postmodernism is fundamental to many members of the L.A. School, who rely heavily upon theorists associated with postmodernism, such as Baudrillard, Foucault, Jameson, and Derrida. A further stream of work emerging from the LA School is represented by Scott and Storper's many publications on flexible specialization, agglomeration, and the economic dynamics of the contemporary metropolis. Scott and Storper's work differs from that of Dear and Soja by approaching urban theory from the perspective of postfordism rather than postmodernism. Scott and Storper represent one distinctive tendency in the LA School; Dear and Soja represent another.

== Criticism ==
A number of criticisms have been raised against the Los Angeles School. In particular, critics question the L.A. School's fundamental claim that Los Angeles should be considered the paradigmatic postmodern American city. This stems both from external comparisons which have been made between Los Angeles and other cities, and findings that in certain cases urban phenomena in Los Angeles do not match those of other American cities.

In a 2023 response to critiques of the LA School as "postmodern," Stefano Bloch and Thomas Brasdefer explore the work of Edward W. Soja, writing that "the neat categorization (of the LA School as postmodern) is one that is both real and imagined — as limiting as it is liberating."

== See also ==
- Post-Fordism
- Globalization
- Urban structure
- Urban theory
- Urbanism
