= List of human geographers =

The following is a list of notable human geographers.

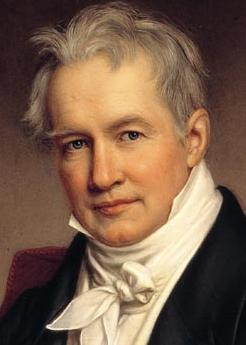
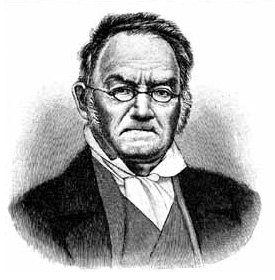
Alexander von Humboldt and Carl Ritter – considered to be among the founders of modern geography

== List ==
- Alexander von Humboldt (1769-1859), one of the founders of modern geography. he traveled extensively and pioneered empirical research methods that would later develop primarily into biogeography and physical geography but also anticipated population geography and economic geography. Humboldt University of Berlin is named after von Humboldt and his brother Wilhelm von Humboldt.
- Carl Ritter (1779–1859), considered to be one of the founders of modern geography and first chair in geography at the Humboldt University of Berlin, also noted for his use of organic analogy in his works.
- Xavier Hommaire de Hell (1812–1848), research in Turkey, southern Russia and Persia
- Élisée Reclus (1830–1905), known for his monumental 19 volume The Earth and Its Inhabitants, he coined the term social geography and his thinking anticipated the social ecology and animal rights movements, where he advocated anarchism and veganism as part of an ethical life.
- Peter Kropotkin (1842–1921), one of the first radical geographers, he was a proponent of anarchism and notable for his introduction of the concept of mutual aid.
- Friedrich Ratzel (1844–1904), environmental determinist, invented the term Lebensraum
- Paul Vidal de la Blache (1845–1918), founder of the French School of geopolitics and possibilism.
- Sir Halford John Mackinder (1861–1947), author of The Geographical Pivot of History, co-founder of the London School of Economics, along with the Geographical Association.
- Jovan Cvijić (1865–1927), a Serbian geographer and a world-renowned scientist. He started his scientific career as a geographer and geologist, and continued his activity as an anthropogeographer and sociologist.
- Carl O. Sauer (1889–1975), critic of environmental determinism and proponent of cultural ecology.
- Walter Christaller (1893–1969), economic geographer and developer of the central place theory.
- Richard Hartshorne (1899–1992), scholar of the history and philosophy of geography.
- Torsten Hägerstrand (1916–2004), key figure in the quantitative revolution and regional science, developer of time geography and indirect contributor to aspects of critical geography.
- Milton Santos (1926–2001), winner of the Vautrin Lud Prize in 1994, one of the most important geographers in South America.
- Waldo R. Tobler (1930–2018), developer of the First law of geography.
- Gamal Hamdan (1928–1993), an Egyptian thinker, intellect and professor of geography. Best known for The Character of Egypt, Studies of the Arab World, and The Contemporary Islamic World Geography, which form a trilogy on Egypt's natural, economic, political and cultural character and its position in the world.
- Yi-Fu Tuan (1930–2022), key figure behind the development of humanist and phenomenological geography and the most prominent Chinese-American geographer. Recipient of the Vautrin Lud Prize in 2012.
- David Harvey (born 1935), world's most cited academic geographer and winner of the Lauréat Prix International de Géographie Vautrin Lud, also noted for his work in critical geography and critique of global capitalism.
- Evelyn Stokes (1936–2005). Professor of geography at the University of Waikato in New Zealand. Known for recognizing inequality with marginalised groups including women and Māori using geography.
- Allen J. Scott (born 1938), winner of Vautrin Lud Prize in 2003 and the Anders Retzius Gold medal 2009; author of numerous books and papers on economic and urban geography, known for his work on regional development, new industrial spaces, agglomeration theory, global city-regions and the cultural economy.
- Edward Soja (1941–2015), noted for his work on regional development, planning and governance, and postmodern geographies, along with coining the terms synekism and postmetropolis.
- Doreen Massey (1944–2016), key scholar in the space and places of globalization and its pluralities, winner of the Vautrin Lud Prize.
- Denis Cosgrove (1948–2008), Alexander von Humboldt Professor of geography at UCLA in California. Specialized in cultural geography and landscapes.
- Michael Watts, Class of 1963 Professor of Geography and Development Studies, University of California, Berkeley
- Nigel Thrift (born 1949), developer of non-representational theory.
- Derek Gregory (born 1951), famous for writing on the Israeli, U.S. and UK actions in the Middle East after 9/11, influenced by Edward Said and has contributed work on imagined geographies.
- Cindi Katz (born 1954), who writes on social reproduction and the production of space. Writing on children's geographies, place and nature, everyday life and security.
- Gillian Rose (born 1962), most famous for her critique: Feminism & Geography: The Limits of Geographical Knowledge (1993), which was one of the first moves towards a development of feminist geography.
