= Space =

Framework of distances and directions

A right-handed three-dimensional Cartesian coordinate system used to indicate positions in space

Space is a three-dimensional continuum containing positions and directions. In classical physics, physical space is often conceived in three linear dimensions. Modern physicists usually consider it, with time, to be part of a boundless four-dimensional continuum known as spacetime. The concept of space is considered to be of fundamental importance to an understanding of the physical universe. However, disagreement continues between philosophers over whether it is itself an entity, a relationship between entities, or part of a conceptual framework.

In the 19th and 20th centuries mathematicians began to examine geometries that are non-Euclidean, in which space is conceived as curved, rather than flat, as in the Euclidean space. According to Albert Einstein's theory of general relativity, space around gravitational fields deviates from Euclidean space. Experimental tests of general relativity have confirmed that non-Euclidean geometries provide a better model for the shape of space.

== Philosophy of space ==
Debates concerning the nature, essence and the mode of existence of space date back to antiquity; namely, to treatises like the Timaeus of Plato, or Socrates in his reflections on what the Greeks called khôra (i.e. "space"), or in the Physics of Aristotle (Book IV, Delta) in the definition of topos (i.e. place), or in the later "geometrical conception of place" as "space qua extension" in the Discourse on Place (Qawl fi al-Makan) of the 11th-century Arab polymath Alhazen. Many of these classical philosophical questions were discussed in the Renaissance and then reformulated in the 17th century, particularly during the early development of classical mechanics.

Isaac Newton viewed space as absolute, existing permanently and independently of whether there was any matter in it. In contrast, other natural philosophers, notably Gottfried Leibniz, thought that space was in fact a collection of relations between objects, given by their distance and direction from one another. In the 18th century, the philosopher and theologian George Berkeley attempted to refute the "visibility of spatial depth" in his Essay Towards a New Theory of Vision. Later, the metaphysician Immanuel Kant said that the concepts of space and time are not empirical ones derived from experiences of the outside world—they are elements of an already given systematic framework that humans possess and use to structure all experiences. Kant referred to the experience of "space" in his Critique of Pure Reason as being a subjective "pure a priori form of intuition".

=== Galileo ===
Galilean and Cartesian theories about space, matter, and motion are at the foundation of the Scientific Revolution, which is understood to have culminated with the publication of Newton's Principia Mathematica in 1687. Newton's theories about space and time helped him explain the movement of objects. While his theory of space is considered the most influential in physics, it emerged from his predecessors' ideas about the same.

As one of the pioneers of modern science, Galileo revised the established Aristotelian and Ptolemaic ideas about a geocentric cosmos. He backed the Copernican theory that the universe was heliocentric, with a stationary Sun at the center and the planets—including the Earth—revolving around the Sun. If the Earth moved, the Aristotelian belief that its natural tendency was to remain at rest was in question. Galileo wanted to prove instead that the Sun moved around its axis, that motion was as natural to an object as the state of rest. In other words, for Galileo, celestial bodies, including the Earth, were naturally inclined to move in circles. This view displaced another Aristotelian idea—that all objects gravitated towards their designated natural place-of-belonging.

=== René Descartes ===
Descartes set out to replace the Aristotelian worldview with a theory about space and motion as determined by natural laws. In other words, he sought a metaphysical foundation or a mechanical explanation for his theories about matter and motion. Cartesian space was Euclidean in structure—infinite, uniform and flat. It was defined as that which contained matter; conversely, matter by definition had a spatial extension so that there was no such thing as empty space.

The Cartesian notion of space is closely linked to his theories about the nature of the body, mind and matter. He is famously known for his "cogito ergo sum" (I think therefore I am), or the idea that we can only be certain of the fact that we can doubt, and therefore think and therefore exist. His theories belong to the rationalist tradition, which attributes knowledge about the world to our ability to think rather than to our experiences, as the empiricists believe. He posited a clear distinction between the body and mind, which is referred to as the Cartesian dualism.

=== Leibniz and Newton ===
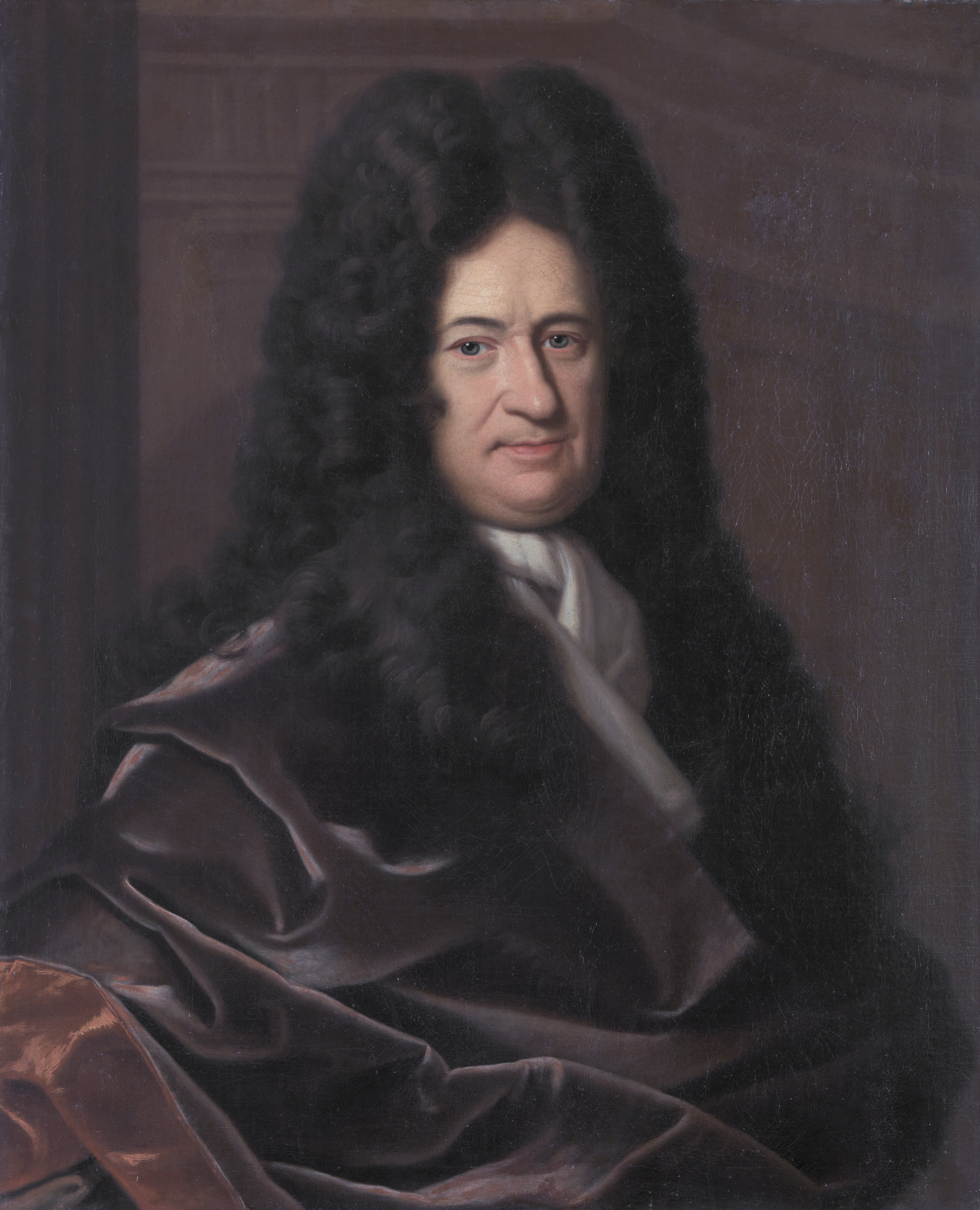
Gottfried Leibniz

Following Galileo and Descartes, during the seventeenth century the philosophy of space and time revolved around the ideas of Gottfried Leibniz, a German philosopher–mathematician, and Isaac Newton, who set out two opposing theories of what space is. Rather than being an entity that independently exists over and above other matter, Leibniz held that space is no more than the collection of spatial relations between objects in the world: "space is that which results from places taken together". Unoccupied regions are those that could have objects in them, and thus spatial relations with other places. For Leibniz, then, space was an idealised abstraction from the relations between individual entities or their possible locations and therefore could not be continuous but must be discrete. Space could be thought of in a similar way to the relations between family members. Although people in the family are related to one another, the relations do not exist independently of the people. Leibniz argued that space could not exist independently of objects in the world because that implies a difference between two universes exactly alike except for the location of the material world in each universe. But since there would be no observational way of telling these universes apart then, according to the identity of indiscernibles, there would be no real difference between them. According to the principle of sufficient reason, any theory of space that implied that there could be these two possible universes must therefore be wrong.

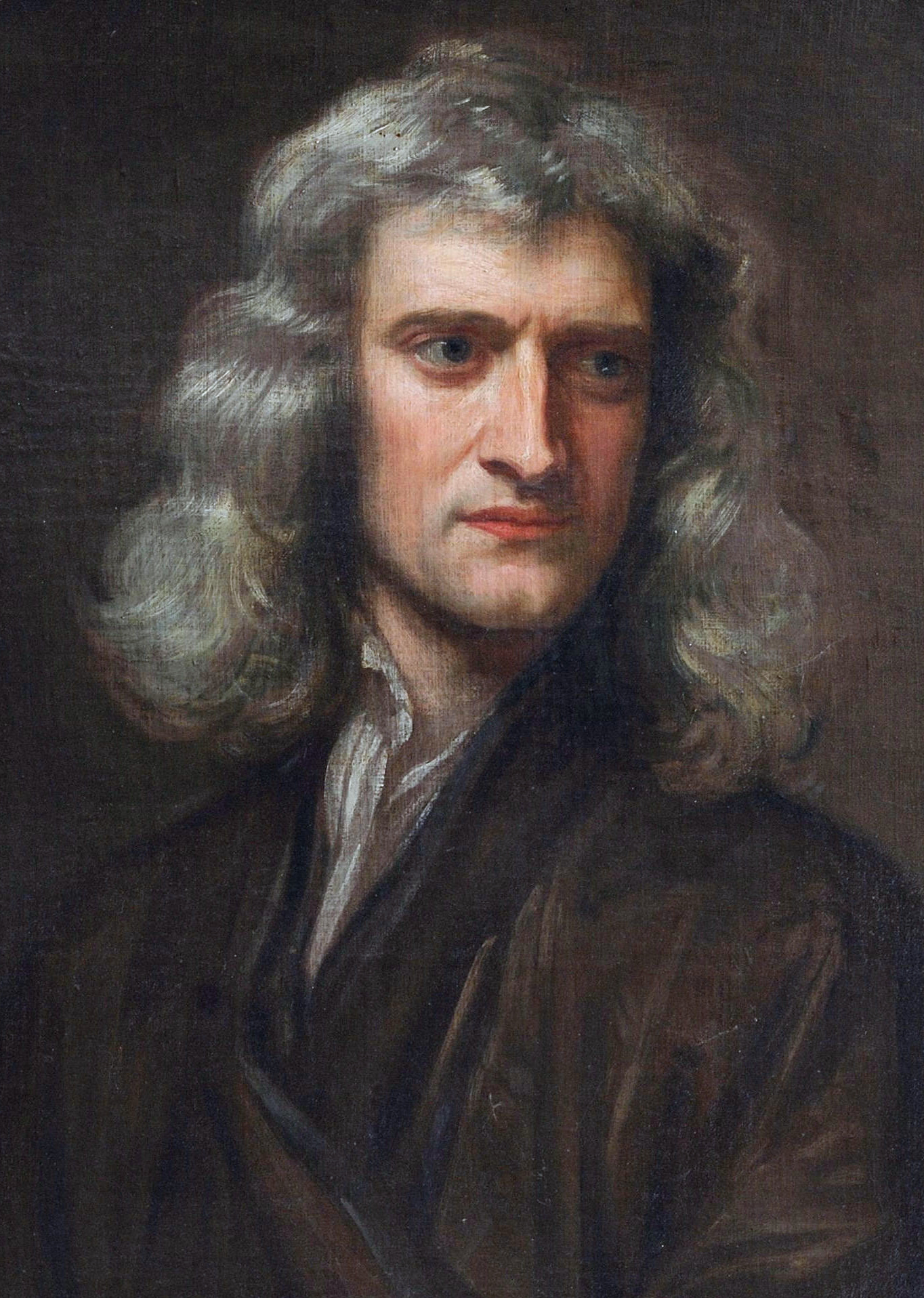
Isaac Newton

Newton took space to be more than relations between material objects and based his position on observation and experimentation. For a relationist there can be no real difference between inertial motion, in which the object travels with constant velocity, and non-inertial motion, in which the velocity changes with time, since all spatial measurements are relative to other objects and their motions. But Newton argued that since non-inertial motion generates forces, it must be absolute. He used the example of water in a spinning bucket to demonstrate his argument. Water in a bucket is hung from a rope and set to spin, starts with a flat surface. After a while, as the bucket continues to spin, the surface of the water becomes concave. If the bucket's spinning is stopped then the surface of the water remains concave as it continues to spin. The concave surface is therefore apparently not the result of relative motion between the bucket and the water. Instead, Newton argued, it must be a result of non-inertial motion relative to space itself. For several centuries the bucket argument was considered decisive in showing that space must exist independently of matter.

=== Kant ===
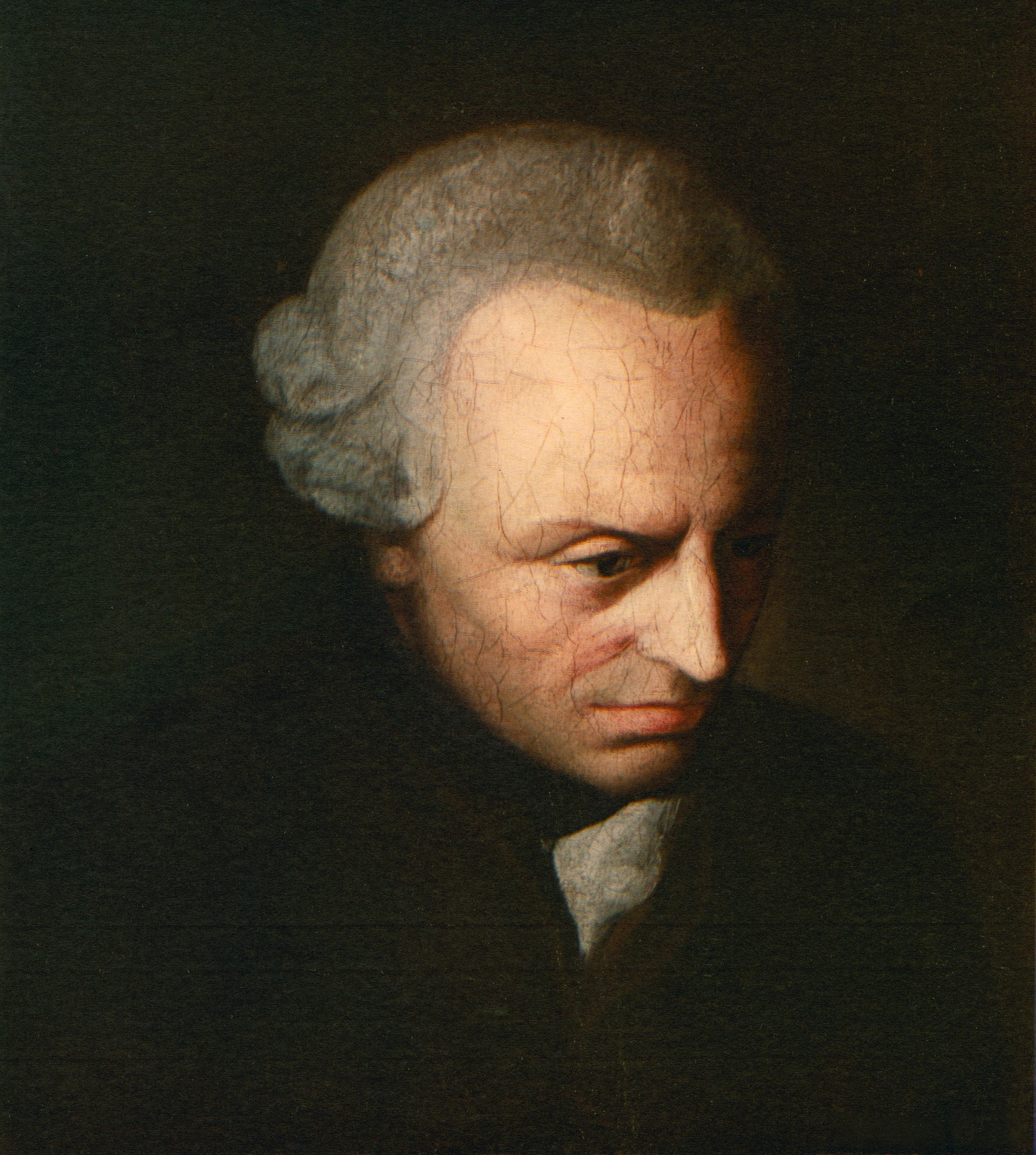
Immanuel Kant

In the eighteenth century the German philosopher Immanuel Kant published his theory of space as "a property of our mind" by which "we represent to ourselves objects as outside us, and all as in space" in the Critique of Pure Reason On his view the nature of spatial predicates are "relations that only attach to the form of intuition alone, and thus to the subjective constitution of our mind, without which these predicates could not be attached to anything at all." This develops his theory of knowledge in which knowledge about space itself can be both a priori and synthetic. According to Kant, knowledge about space is synthetic because any proposition about space cannot be true merely in virtue of the meaning of the terms contained in the proposition. In the counter-example, the proposition "all unmarried men are bachelors" is true by virtue of each term's meaning. Further, space is a priori because it is the form of our receptive abilities to receive information about the external world. For example, someone without sight can still perceive spatial attributes via touch, hearing, and smell. Knowledge of space itself is a priori because it belongs to the subjective constitution of our mind as the form or manner of our intuition of external objects.

=== Non-Euclidean geometry ===
Spherical geometry is similar to elliptical geometry. On a sphere (the surface of a ball) there are no parallel lines.

Euclid's Elements contained five postulates that form the basis for Euclidean geometry. One of these, the parallel postulate, has been the subject of debate among mathematicians for many centuries. It states that on any plane on which there is a straight line L_{1} and a point P not on L_{1}, there is exactly one straight line L_{2} on the plane that passes through the point P and is parallel to the straight line L_{1}. Until the 19th century, few doubted the truth of the postulate; instead debate centered over whether it was necessary as an axiom, or whether it was a theory that could be derived from the other axioms. Around 1830 though, the Hungarian János Bolyai and the Russian Nikolai Ivanovich Lobachevsky separately published treatises on a type of geometry that does not include the parallel postulate, called hyperbolic geometry. In this geometry, an infinite number of parallel lines pass through the point P. Consequently, the sum of angles in a triangle is less than 180° and the ratio of a circle's circumference to its diameter is greater than pi. In the 1850s, Bernhard Riemann developed an equivalent theory of elliptical geometry, in which no parallel lines pass through P. In this geometry, triangles have more than 180° and circles have a ratio of circumference-to-diameter that is less than pi.

Type of geometry	Number of parallels	Sum of angles in a triangle	Ratio of circumference to diameter of circle	Measure of curvature
Hyperbolic	Infinite	< 180°	> π	< 0
Euclidean	1	180°	π	0
Elliptical	0	> 180°	< π	> 0

=== Gauss and Poincaré ===
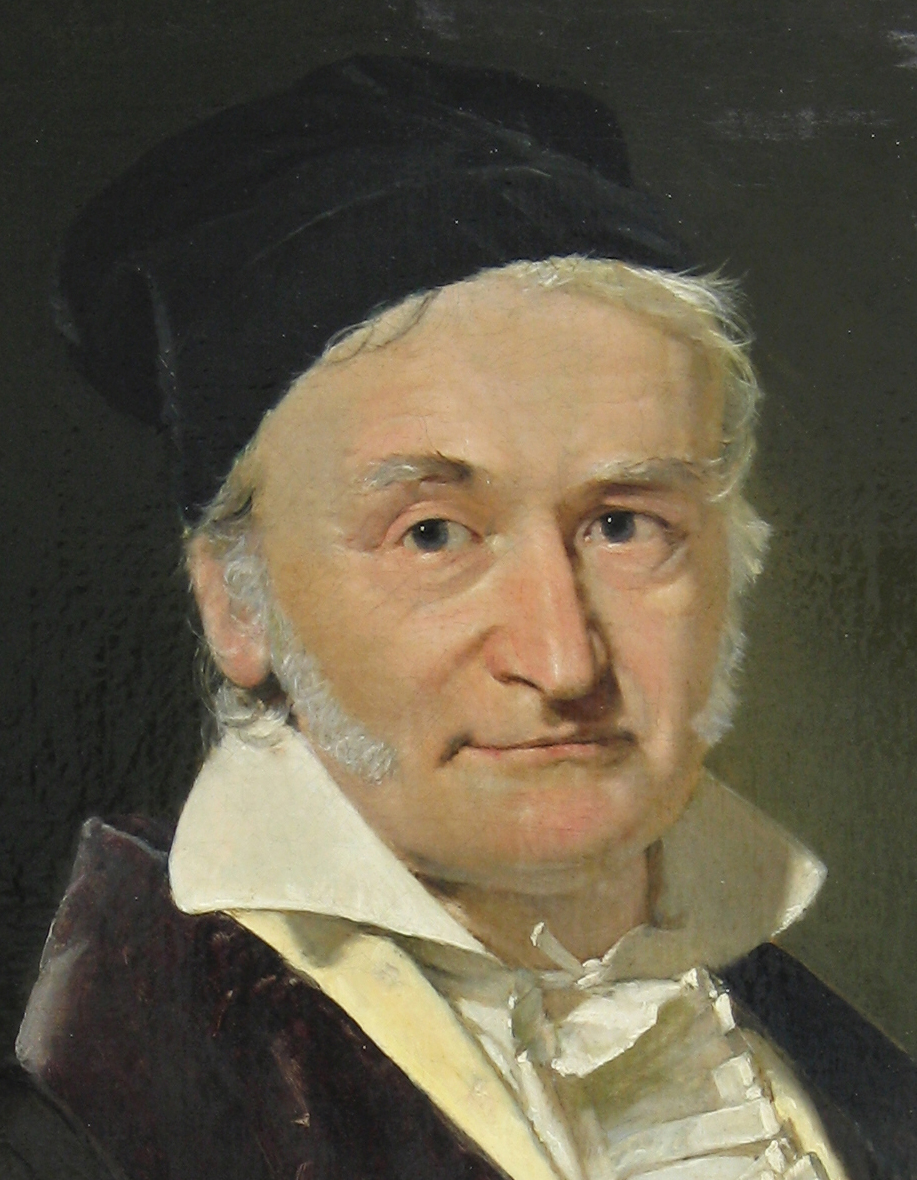
Carl Friedrich Gauss

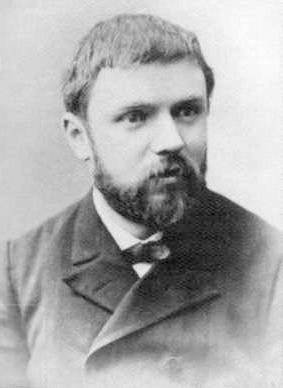
Henri Poincaré

Although there was a prevailing Kantian consensus at the time, once non-Euclidean geometries had been formalised, some began to wonder whether or not physical space is curved. Carl Friedrich Gauss, a German mathematician, was the first to consider an empirical investigation of the geometrical structure of space. He thought of making a test of the sum of the angles of an enormous stellar triangle, and there are reports that he actually carried out a test, on a small scale, by triangulating mountain tops in Germany.

Henri Poincaré, a French mathematician and physicist of the late 19th century, introduced an important insight in which he attempted to demonstrate the futility of any attempt to discover which geometry applies to space by experiment. He considered the predicament that would face scientists if they were confined to the surface of an imaginary large sphere with particular properties, known as a sphere-world. In this world, the temperature is taken to vary in such a way that all objects expand and contract in similar proportions in different places on the sphere. With a suitable falloff in temperature, if the scientists try to use measuring rods to determine the sum of the angles in a triangle, they can be deceived into thinking that they inhabit a plane, rather than a spherical surface. In fact, the scientists cannot in principle determine whether they inhabit a plane or sphere and, Poincaré argued, the same is true for the debate over whether real space is Euclidean or not. For him, which geometry was used to describe space was a matter of convention. Since Euclidean geometry is simpler than non-Euclidean geometry, he assumed the former would always be used to describe the 'true' geometry of the world.

=== Einstein ===
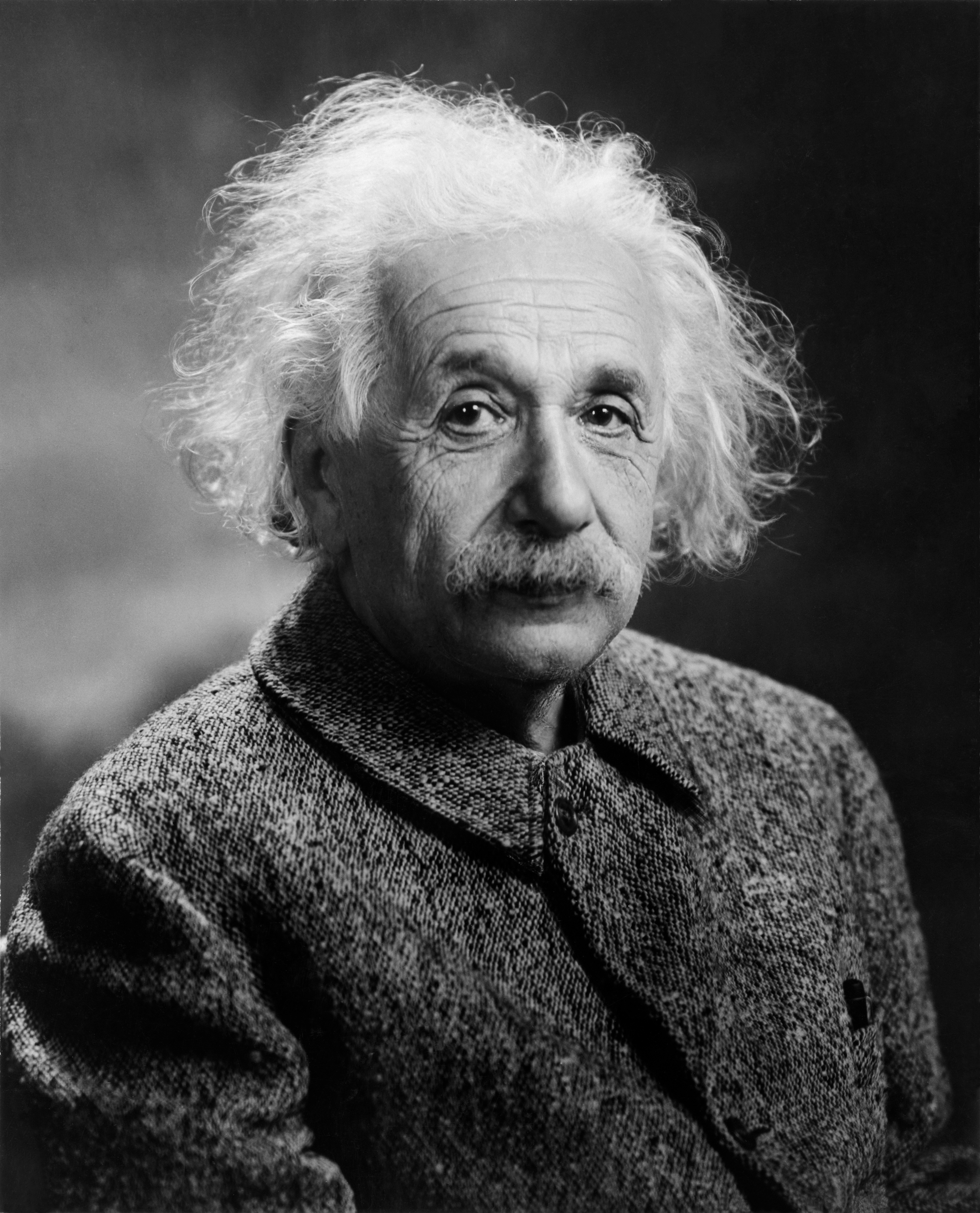
Albert Einstein

In 1905, Albert Einstein published his special theory of relativity, which led to the concept that space and time can be viewed as a single construct known as spacetime. In this theory, the speed of light in vacuum is the same for all observers—which has the result that two events that appear simultaneous to one particular observer will not be simultaneous to another observer if the observers are moving with respect to one another. Moreover, an observer will measure a moving clock to tick more slowly than one that is stationary with respect to them; and objects are measured to be shortened in the direction that they are moving with respect to the observer.

Subsequently, Einstein worked on a general theory of relativity, which is a theory of how gravity interacts with spacetime. Instead of viewing gravity as a force field acting in spacetime, Einstein suggested that it modifies the geometric structure of spacetime itself. According to the general theory, time goes more slowly at places with lower gravitational potentials and rays of light bend in the presence of a gravitational field. Scientists have studied the behaviour of binary pulsars, confirming the predictions of Einstein's theories. Non-Euclidean geometry is usually used to describe spacetime.

== Mathematics ==
In modern mathematics spaces are defined as sets with some added structure. They are typically topological spaces, in which a concept of neighbourhood is defined, frequently by means of a distance (metric spaces). The elements of a space are often called points, but they can have other names such as vectors in vector spaces and functions in function spaces.

== Physics ==
Space is one of the few fundamental quantities in physics, meaning that it cannot be defined via other quantities because nothing more fundamental is known at the present. On the other hand, it can be related to other fundamental quantities. Thus, similar to other fundamental quantities (like time and mass), space can be explored via measurement and experiment.

Today, our three-dimensional space is viewed as embedded in a four-dimensional spacetime, called Minkowski space (see special relativity). The idea behind spacetime is that time is hyperbolic-orthogonal to each of the three spatial dimensions.

=== Relativity ===
Before Albert Einstein's work on relativistic physics, time and space were viewed as independent dimensions. Einstein's discoveries showed that due to relativity of motion our space and time can be mathematically combined into one object–spacetime. It turns out that distances in space or in time separately are not invariant with respect to Lorentz coordinate transformations, but distances in Minkowski space along spacetime intervals are—which justifies the name.

In addition, time and space dimensions should not be viewed as exactly equivalent in Minkowski space. One can freely move in space but not in time. Thus, time and space coordinates are treated differently both in special relativity (where time is sometimes considered an imaginary coordinate) and in general relativity (where different signs are assigned to time and space components of spacetime metric).

Furthermore, in Einstein's general theory of relativity, it is postulated that spacetime is geometrically distorted – curved – near to gravitationally significant masses.

One consequence of this postulate, which follows from the equations of general relativity, is the prediction of moving ripples of spacetime, called gravitational waves. While indirect evidence for these waves has been found (in the motions of the Hulse–Taylor binary system, for example) experiments attempting to directly measure these waves are ongoing at the LIGO and Virgo collaborations. LIGO scientists reported the first such direct observation of gravitational waves on 14 September 2015.

=== Cosmology ===
Relativity theory leads to the cosmological question of what shape the universe is, and where space came from. It appears that space was created in the Big Bang, 13.8 billion years ago and has been expanding ever since. The overall shape of space is not known, but space is known to be expanding very rapidly due to the cosmic inflation.

== Spatial measurement ==
The measurement of physical space has long been important. Although earlier societies had developed measuring systems, the International System of Units, (SI), is now the most common system of units used in the measuring of space, and is almost universally used.

Currently, the standard space interval, called a standard meter or simply meter, is defined as the distance traveled by light in vacuum during a time interval of exactly 1/299,792,458 of a second. This definition coupled with present definition of the second is based on the special theory of relativity in which the speed of light plays the role of a fundamental constant of nature.

== Geographical space ==
Geography is the branch of science concerned with identifying and describing places on Earth, utilizing spatial awareness to try to understand why things exist in specific locations. Cartography is the mapping of spaces to allow better navigation, for visualization purposes and to act as a locational device. Geostatistics apply statistical concepts to collected spatial data of Earth to create an estimate for unobserved phenomena.

Geographical space is often considered as land, and can have a relation to ownership usage (in which space is seen as property or territory). While some cultures assert the rights of the individual in terms of ownership, other cultures will identify with a communal approach to land ownership, while still other cultures such as Australian Aboriginals, rather than asserting ownership rights to land, invert the relationship and consider that they are in fact owned by the land. Spatial planning is a method of regulating the use of space at land-level, with decisions made at regional, national and international levels. Space can also impact on human and cultural behavior, being an important factor in architecture, where it will impact on the design of buildings and structures, and on farming.

Ownership of space is not restricted to land. Ownership of airspace and of waters is decided internationally. Other forms of ownership have been recently asserted to other spaces—for example to the radio bands of the electromagnetic spectrum or to cyberspace.

Public space is a term used to define areas of land as collectively owned by the community, and managed in their name by delegated bodies; such spaces are open to all, while private property is the land culturally owned by an individual or company, for their own use and pleasure.

Abstract space is a term used in geography to refer to a hypothetical space characterized by complete homogeneity. When modeling activity or behavior, it is a conceptual tool used to limit extraneous variables such as terrain.

== In psychology ==
Psychologists first began to study the way space is perceived in the middle of the 19th century. Those now concerned with such studies regard it as a distinct branch of psychology. Psychologists analyzing the perception of space are concerned with how recognition of an object's physical appearance or its interactions are perceived, see, for example, visual space.

Other, more specialized topics studied include amodal perception and object permanence. The perception of surroundings is important due to its necessary relevance to survival, especially with regards to hunting and self preservation as well as simply one's idea of personal space.

Several space-related phobias have been identified, including agoraphobia (the fear of open spaces), astrophobia (the fear of celestial space) and claustrophobia (the fear of enclosed spaces).

The understanding of three-dimensional space in humans is thought to be learned during infancy using unconscious inference, and is closely related to hand-eye coordination. The visual ability to perceive the world in three dimensions is called depth perception.

== In the social sciences ==
Space has been studied in the social sciences from the perspectives of Marxism, feminism, postmodernism, postcolonialism, urban theory and critical geography. These theories account for the effect of the history of colonialism, transatlantic slavery and globalization on our understanding and experience of space and place. The topic has garnered attention since the 1980s, after the publication of Henri Lefebvre's The Production of Space . In this book, Lefebvre applies Marxist ideas about the production of commodities and accumulation of capital to discuss space as a social product. His focus is on the multiple and overlapping social processes that produce space.

In his book The Condition of Postmodernity, David Harvey describes what he terms the "time-space compression." This is the effect of technological advances and capitalism on our perception of time, space and distance. Changes in the modes of production and consumption of capital affect and are affected by developments in transportation and technology. These advances create relationships across time and space, new markets and groups of wealthy elites in urban centers, all of which annihilate distances and affect our perception of linearity and distance.

In his book Thirdspace, Edward Soja describes space and spatiality as an integral and neglected aspect of what he calls the "trialectics of being," the three modes that determine how we inhabit, experience and understand the world. He argues that critical theories in the Humanities and Social Sciences study the historical and social dimensions of our lived experience, neglecting the spatial dimension. He builds on Henri Lefebvre's work to address the dualistic way in which humans understand space—as either material/physical or as represented/imagined. Lefebvre's "lived space" and Soja's "thirdspace" are terms that account for the complex ways in which humans understand and navigate place, which "firstspace" and "Secondspace" (Soja's terms for material and imagined spaces respectively) do not fully encompass.

Postcolonial theorist Homi Bhabha's concept of Third Space is different from Soja's Thirdspace, even though both terms offer a way to think outside the terms of a binary logic. Bhabha's Third Space is the space in which hybrid cultural forms and identities exist. In his theories, the term hybrid describes new cultural forms that emerge through the interaction between colonizer and colonized.

== See also ==
- Quantum state space
- Absolute space and time
- Aether theories
- Cosmology
- General relativity
- Philosophy of space and time
- Proxemics
- Shape of the universe
- Social space
- Space exploration
- Spacetime (mathematics)
- Spatial analysis
- Spatial–temporal reasoning
