= Killing of Cesar Rene Arce =

American graffiti artist

Cesar Rene Arce (born 1976) was an American graffiti artist who was shot to death in Los Angeles in 1995 at age 18. A fellow tagger, David Hillo, was injured. The assailant, William Masters, was prosecuted on weapons charges and received three years probation. The case caused deep controversy in Los Angeles at the time, with both supporters and detractors of Masters' action.

== Shooting ==
On January 31, 1995, Arce was writing graffiti under the Hollywood Freeway with a friend, David Hillo, 20. The pair were confronted by William Masters, a failed U.S. Marine and aspiring actor, allegedly acting as vigilante. Masters stopped his car to take down the license plate number of Arce's car. A confrontation ensued, with Arce producing a screwdriver. Although precise details of the confrontation are in dispute, it ended with Masters shooting Arce in the back, killing the teenager, and shooting Hilo in his backside, wounding him.

== Prosecution ==
Masters was arrested on suspicion of murder following the shooting. He was released the next day without being charged. Masters was later prosecuted for misdemeanor weapons charges, but, based on his claim of self-defense, was never charged in Arce's death. He received a sentence of three years probation, as well as 30 days of community service removing graffiti.

== Aftermath and legacy ==
The death of Arce, who was of Mexican heritage, stirred deep controversy within the Los Angeles community at the time. On February 10, a 100-person protest in front of the L.A. district attorney 's office called attention to the failure to file murder charges against Masters. Over time, Arce has become celebrated among supporters of graffiti artists.

Some Los Angeles residents supported Masters' actions, calling him variously a "hero", a "do gooder", an "observant neighbor" and a "white knight". Local radio stations were flooded with calls supporting him.

The story of Arce's killing is referenced in Susan Phillips's book Wallbangin': Graffiti and Gangs in L.A. and Stefano Bloch's Going All City: Struggle and Survival in LA's Graffiti Subculture.
