= Sallie A. Marston =

American geographer (born 1953)

Sallie A. Marston (born 1953) is an American social geographer and Regents Professor in the University of Arizona School of Geography, Development and Environment located in Tucson, Arizona.

Martson is recipient of the American Association of Geographers Lifetime Achievement Award (with Edward W. Soja) in 2013.

Marston's noted work on "the social constriction of scale" has been published in the journal Progress in Human Geography and cited over 2600 times.

As a feminist scholar of "space and place," Marston has authored and co-authored several textbooks including World Regions in Global Context: Peoples, Places, and Environments in its 6th edition, The Sage Handbook of Social Geographies, and Human Geography: Places and Regions in Global Context.

Marston's collaborators include Rachel Pain, Diana Liverman, Cindi Katz, and Eric Sheppard with whom she writes about Neil Smith.

Sallie A. Marston is the founding director of the School Garden Workshop in Tucson, Arizona.

In 2022, Marston was recipient of the Ray Davies Lifetime Humanitarian Achievement Award.
