= Tunde Decker =

Nigerian historian and academic

Prof. Tunde Decker
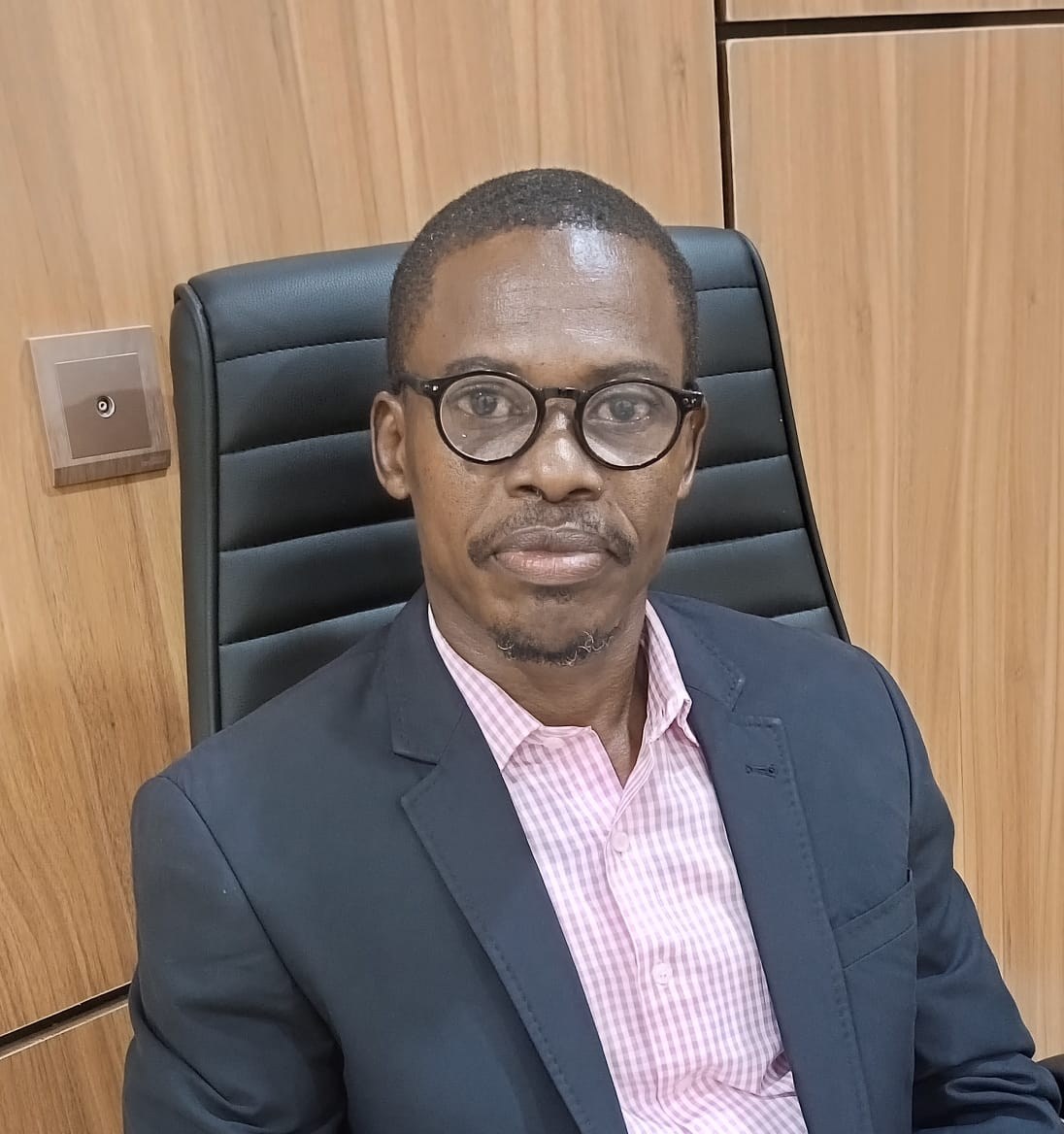
- Occupations: Academic, social historian

Academic background
- Education: University of Lagos

Academic work
- Discipline: History
- Sub-discipline: Nigerian history, social history, history of poverty, urban development,
- Institutions: Osun State University

Babatunde "Tunde" Jonathan Decker is a Nigerian historian and academic specializing in African social history, particularly the history of poverty, urban development, and marginalized communities in colonial and post-colonial Nigeria. His latest book is "I Beg to Tell: Everyday Agency in Colonial Lagos, 1940-1960" released in 2025 as part of the African Humanities Series.

== Academic career ==
Decker holds a PhD in History and Strategic Studies from the University of Lagos, where he completed a doctoral dissertation entitled "A History of the Poor in Lagos 1861-1960". He is a professor in the Department of History and International Studies at Osun State University, Osogbo, Nigeria, where he has previously served as head of the department. Decker is the incumbent dean of the Faculty of Humanities at the same university.

Decker has held postdoctoral fellowships from the American Council of Learned Societies African Humanities Program in New York, the Leventis Foundation in London, the Urban Studies Foundation in Scotland, and the Africa-Oxford Initiative in Oxford. He was a visiting scholar at the African Studies Centre, School of Area and Global Studies, University of Oxford, and at the School of Oriental and African Studies, University of London.

Decker is a Fellow of the Ife Institute of Advanced Studies and the Lagos Studies Association; and he sits on the editorial board of several journals including the Humanus Discourse and the Journal of Culture and Ideas.

== Selected publications ==
Decker has published extensively on Nigerian history and African development. His publications include:

- Decker, Tunde (2025). I Beg to Tell: Everyday Agency in Colonial Lagos, 1940-1960. Makhanda: NISC Publishers.
- Decker, Tunde (2025). "Perception and 'Salvation Government' in 1940s Lagos Petitions". The Journal of Imperial and Commonwealth History. 53 (3): 609–627. doi:10.1080/03086534.2025.2521369. ISSN 0308-6534.
- Decker, Tunde (2024). "Poverty in Africa: History, Misunderstandings, and the Living". African Historical Review. 55 (1): 81–99. doi:10.1080/17532523.2024.2401672. ISSN 1753-2523.
- Decker, Tunde (2023). "From 'Bad Samaritans' to 'Bad Victims': A Political Economy of Africa-Nigeria Nexus of Poverty". Journal of Asian and African Studies. 58 (3): 389–400. doi:10.1177/00219096211069653. ISSN 0021-9096.
- Decker, Tunde (2022). "Girl at the margin: historicizing Adunni's subjective rendition of colonial Lagos, 1930–60". Africa. 92 (3): 315–333. doi:10.1017/S0001972022000304. ISSN 0001-9720.
- Decker, Tunde (2021). "Handwritten in Lagos: Selfhood and Textuality in Colonial Petitions". History in Africa. 48: 355–382. doi:10.1017/hia.2021.4. ISSN 0361-5413.
- Decker, Tunde (2021). "Revisiting the 'silent' voice of teenagers in Lagos 1940 – 1950". Drumspeak: International Journal of Research in the Humanities. 5 (3): 50–65. ISSN 2821-8981.
- Decker, Tunde (2016). Matrix of Inherited Identity: A Historical Exploration of the Underdog Phenomenon in Nigeria's Relationship Strategies, 1960-2011. University Press PLC. ISBN 978-978-940-204-5.
- Decker, T. (2013). "Poverty and the Travails of the Family in late Colonial Lagos". Lagos Historical Review. 13: 31–50. doi:10.4314/lhr.v13i1.3. ISSN 1596-5031.
- Decker, Tunde (2008). A History of Aviation in Nigeria, 1925-2005. Dele-Davis Publishers. ISBN 978-978-088-587-8.

Decker has also published a poetry anthology entitled "Sweet Songs for the Trodden" released in 2007.

== Professional experience ==
Before entering academia, Decker worked for a decade in media and public relations, covering Nigeria's aviation industry as a reporter and later news editor for Aviation Week and Tours magazine. As a publicist in Lagos, Decker managed public relations for major corporations including Coca-Cola Nigeria and Nigerian Bottling Company. He also served as conservation manager, media and public affairs for the Nigerian Conservation Foundation.
