= Synek =

Synek (Czech pronunciation: [ˈsɪnɛk]) is a Czech surname:

- Jana Synková (1944–2024), Czech actress
- Jiří Synek, Czech poet, prose writer, essayist
- Liane Synek (1922–1982), Austrian opera singer
- Ondřej Synek (born 1982), Czech rower

== See also ==
- Yana Gupta (born 1979 as Jana Synková), Czech model and actress
- Synekism
