= Gray Ghost =

Gray Ghost or Grey Ghost may refer to:

== Arts and entertainment ==
- The Gray Ghost (TV series), a 1950s American historical television series
- The Gray Ghost, a novel by Robert F. Schulkers, referenced and quoted in the popular novel To Kill a Mockingbird.
- Grey Ghost, a band fronted by Ruby Starr
- Gray Ghost (DC animated universe), a superhero in Batman: The Animated Series voiced by Adam West
- The Gray Ghost (serial), a lost 1917 film serial
- Grey Ghost, a fictional hero in the novel Everybody's All-American
- Grey Ghost of the forest, an alias of Dog from New Zealand comic strip Footrot Flats
- Grey Ghost, a fictional character in the Speed Racer film adaptation
- Gray Ghost, a radio station corporation based in South Dakota

== People ==
- John S. Mosby (1833–1916), Confederate cavalryman and partisan who fought during the American Civil War
- Roosevelt Williams (1903–1996), blues pianist nicknamed "Grey Ghost"
- Tony Canadeo (1919–2003), football star, "the Gray Ghost of Gonzaga"
- Fredrick Radtke, an American vigilante.

== Ships ==
- USS Enterprise (CV-6), US Aircraft Carrier
- USS Pensacola (CA-24), US Heavy Cruiser
- USS Iowa (BB-61), US Battleship
- RMS Queen Mary, an ocean liner painted Navy Grey for use as a troopship during the Second World War

== Other uses ==
- Weimaraner, a breed of dogs
- a male Northern harrier
- an early Rolls-Royce Limited car model
- Gray Ghost, slang term for a Walther P38 pistol
- Gray Ghost, a nickname for the experimental aircraft YF-23 Black Widow II
- Grey Ghost, the mascot of Illinois Valley Central High School
- Grey Ghost, a nickname for the bonefish
- Grey Ghosts, the mascot of Westford Academy

== See also ==
- Grey Ghost Streamer, an artificial fly, of the streamer type
- The Grey Lady, the ghost of Helena Ravenclaw in the Harry Potter series
