= Cindi Katz =

American geographer

Cindi Katz (born 1954 in New York City), a geographer, is a Professor in Environmental Psychology, Earth and Environmental Sciences, American Studies, and Women's Studies at the CUNY Graduate Center. Her work concerns social reproduction and the production of space, place and nature; children and the environment; the consequences of global economic restructuring for everyday life; the privatization of the public environment, the intertwining of memory and history in the geographical imagination, and the intertwined spatialities of homeland and home-based security. She is known for her work on social reproduction and everyday life, research on children's geographies, her intervention on "minor theory", and the notion of counter-topography, which is a means of recognizing the historical and geographical specificities of particular places while inferring their analytic connections to specific material social practices.

She is a member of the Children's Environmental Research Group at the Center for Human Environments, and sits on the Advisory Boards of the American Studies and the Women's and Gender Studies Certificate Programs, both at the CUNY Graduate Center. She is a member of the Solidarity Board of Community Voices Heard in New York City. Since 2016 Katz has been a Co-Director of the Futures of American Studies Institute at Dartmouth College, where she's been a faculty member since 2003.

== Education ==
Katz received her BA, MA, and PhD in Geography from Clark University.

== Publications ==
Katz's books include Growing Up Global: Economic Restructuring and Children's Everyday Lives (2004, University of Minnesota Press), which received the 2004 Meridian Book Award for Outstanding Scholarly Work in Geography from the Association of American Geographers. She is the editor (with Janice Monk) of Full Circles: Geographies of Gender over the Life Course (Routledge 1993), Life's Work: Geographies of Social Reproduction (with Sallie A. Marston and Katharyne Mitchell) (Blackwell 2004), and The People, Space, and Space Reader (with Jen Jack Gieseking, William Mangold, Setha Low, and Susan Saegert) (Routledge 2014)]. Her work on social reproduction, everyday life, children and the environment, contemporary childhood, political ecology, social theory and the politics of knowledge has been published in edited collections and in journals such as Environment and Planning D: Society and Space, Social Text, Signs, Feminist Studies, Annals of the Association of American Geographers, Social Justice, Gender, Place, and Culture, Cultural Geographies, Antipode, and Public Culture.

== Fellowships and awards ==
Katz received dissertation fellowships from the National Science Foundation and the American Association of University Women. She held a post-doctoral fellowship in Environmental Psychology at the CUNY Graduate Center from the National Institute of Mental Health. In 2003–4, Katz was a fellow at the Radcliffe Institute for Advanced Study at Harvard University, where she conducted research on US childhood as spectacle. Katz and Nancy K. Miller were awarded the Council of Editors of Learned Journals (CELJ) 2007 Phoenix Award for Significant Editorial Achievement for their work on transforming WSQ: Women's Studies Quarterly. This award is given to the most-improved journal that has launched an overall effort of revitalization or transformation within the previous three years. In 2011–12 she was the Diane Middlebrook and Carl Djerassi Visiting Professor of Gender Studies at Cambridge University and Helen Cam Visiting Fellow at Girton College. In 2015 Katz received the James Blaut Memorial Award for Scholarship, Teaching, and Activism toward Social Justice from the Socialist and Critical Geography Specialty Group, Association of American Geographers. Katz was the recipient of the American Association of Geographers 2021 Distinguished Scholarship Honors and in 2024 of their Lifetime Achievement Honor.

== Editorial ==
Katz was co–general editor of WSQ: Women's Studies Quarterly with Nancy K. Miller from 2004 to 2008. She was an editor of Children's Environments Quarterly, the inaugural book review editor of Gender, Place, and Culture, and a founding editor of Journal of Social and Cultural Geography. Katz serves or has served on the editorial boards of Social Text, Annals of the Association of American Geographers, Antipode, Capitalism, Nature, Socialism, Professional Geographer, Environment and Planning D: Society and Space, and Children's Geographies, among several other academic journals.
