= Vigilante Vigilante: The Battle for Expression =

- Directed by: Max Good
- Written by: Max Good; Julien de Benedictis
- Produced by: Max Good; Nathan Wollman
- Starring: Joe Connolly; James Q. Wilson; Jim Sharp; Fred Radtke; Shepard Fairey; Stefano Bloch
- Cinematography: Max Good
- Edited by: Julien de Benedictis
- Distributed by: Open Ranch Productions
- Release date: August 12, 2011 (San Francisco)
- Running time: 87 minutes
- Country: United States
- Language: English

Vigilante Vigilante: The Battle for Expression is a 2011 documentary film directed by Max Good. The film profiles several anti-graffiti vigilantes throughout the United States, including Jim Sharp (The Silver Buff), Joe Connolly (The Graffiti Guerrilla), and Fred Radtke (The Grey Ghost).

== Festival screenings ==
- New Orleans Film Festival (2011)
- New Hampshire Film Festival (2011)
- Göteborg International Film Festival (2012)
- International Festival of Films on Art (2012)
- Victoria Film Festival (2012)
- Revelation Perth International Film Festival (2012)
- Design Indaba Film Festival (2012)
- DOCUTAH Film Festival (2012)
