= Janice Monk =

Australian-born American geographer (1937–2024)

Janice Jones Monk (13 March 1937 – 12 July 2024) was an Australian-American feminist geographer and researcher in the South West United States, and an Emeritus Professor at the University of Arizona School of Geography, Development and Environment.

== Background ==
Monk was raised in Sydney, Australia and held a B.A. (Honors) in Geography from the University of Sydney (1957). She moved to the United States on a scholarship, receiving an MA and PhD from the University of Illinois (1963, 1972). The topic of her PhD was pioneering: the social conditions of Aboriginal People in rural New South Wales, Australia, living in white majority communities (Socio-Economic Characteristics of Six Aboriginal Communities in Australia: A Comparative Ecological Study). She restudied the town of Griffith in the 2000s. Monk continued working at Illinois as assistant professor of geography from 1972 to 1980, but was unfairly denied tenure. She moved to Tucson, AZ to join the Southwest Institute for Research on Women (SIROW) at the University of Arizona in the same year, serving as its executive director from 1983 to 2004. On retiring in 2004 she became research professor of Geography and Development, and then Emeritus Professor. She served as President of the Association of American Geographers, 2001–2002. She died 12 July 2024, at the age of 87.

== Contributions ==
Monk has made significant contributions to social and cultural geography, with a particular focus on women and minority groups in the US and Mexico and their livelihoods and health. Her work at SIROW involved several large research grants for cross-border and regional support to women's groups and minority communities, totaling $6,500,000. Her The Desert Is No Lady project charted the unwritten history of women pioneers in the US West, resulting in an award-winning book and film.

Her contributions to the discipline of geography have included more than 100 articles in scholarly journals on the development and history of feminist geography, where she is regarded as a pioneer. Her article in 1982 with Susan Hanson was an argument to recognize the substantial contributions of women to the male-dominated discipline, and has been cited 450 times (2024). She has contributed more broadly to the importance of recognizing women in higher education, and the mentoring of women faculty members.

== Recognition ==
- Doctora Honoris Causa (honorary PhD), Autonomous University of Barcelona (2013)
- Lauréat d’Honneur, International Geographical Union (2012)
- Outstanding Achievement Award, Society of Woman Geographers (2008)
- Enhancing Diversity Award, Association of American Geographers (2008)
- Distinguished Mentor Award, National Council for Geographic Education (2004)
- Taylor and Francis Award, Royal Geographical Society (with the Institute of British Geographers) (2003)
- Lifetime Achievement Honors, Association of American Geographers (2000)

The Janice Monk Service Award is awarded annually by the Geographic Perspectives on Women group of the Association of American Geographers. A Janice Monk Lecture in Feminist Geography is also held at the University of Arizona and AAG, and published in the journal Gender, Place and Culture.

A book (A. Datta, J. Momsen, A. M. Oberhauser (eds.) 2023. Bridging Worlds - Building Feminist Geographies: Essays in Honour of Janice Monk. Routledge. ) contains 45 chapters on all aspects of feminist geography that she inspired.

== Publications ==
- Monk, Janice . 2015. Braided streams: spaces and flows in a career. Documents d’Analisi Geografica 61 (1): 5–20.
- Monk, Janice . 2018. Placing gender in geography: directions, challenges and opportunities, Finisterra Annual Lecture. Finisterra 108: 3–14.

---

- Practicing Geography: Careers for Enhancing Society and Environment. Michael Solem, Kenneth Foote, and Janice Monk (eds). Boston: Pearson. 2013.
- Aspiring Academics. Michael Solem, Kenneth Foote, and Janice Monk (eds). Upper Sadddle River, NJ: Prentice Hall. 2009.
- Presidential Musings from the Meridian: Reflections on the Nature of Geography. M.Duane Nellis, Janice Monk, and Susan L. Cutter (eds). University of West Virginia Press. 2004.
- Compartiendo historias de fronteras: cuerpos, géneros, generaciones, y salud. Catalina Denman, Janice Monk and Norma Ojeda de la Peña (eds). Hermosillo: El Colegio de Sonora. 2004.
- Encompassing Gender: Integrating International Studies and Women’s Studies. Mary Lay, Janice Monk and Deborah Rosenfelt (eds). New York: The Feminist Press. 2002.
- The Twenty-first Century Workforce: Opportunity and Promise for Women. Barbara Becker and Janice Monk (eds). Phoenix: Soroptimists International. 1997.
- Women of the European Union: The Politics of Work and Daily Life. Maria Dolors García-Ramon and Janice Monk (eds). London and New York: Routledge. 1996.
- Full Circles: Geographies of Women over the Life Course. Cindi Katz and Janice Monk, (eds). London and New York: Routledge. 1993.
- Teaching Geography in Higher Education. Alan Jenkins, John R. Gold, Roger Lee, Janice Monk, Judith Riley, Ifan Shepherd, and David Unwin. Oxford: Basil Blackwell. 1991.
- Western Women: Their Land, Their Lives. Lillian Schlissel, Vicki Ruiz, and Janice Monk, (eds). Albuquerque: University of New Mexico Press. 1988.
- The Desert Is No Lady: Southwestern Landscapes in Women's Writing and Art. Vera Norwood and Janice Monk, (eds). New Haven: Yale University Press. 1987 and University of Arizona Press, 1997. Awarded Southwest Book Award, Border Regional Library Association, 1988.
- Women and the Arizona Economy. Janice Monk and Alice Schlegel, (eds). Phoenix: Arizona Women's Town Hall/Tucson: Southwest Institute for Research on Women, 1986.
