= Jennifer Wolch =

American geographer

Dean of the College of Environmental Design at UC Berkeley
- In office 2011-2018

Personal details
- Education: Princeton University
- Occupation: Educator

Jennifer R. Wolch is a professor of urban planning, geography and former dean of the UC Berkeley College of Environmental Design.

Before accepting the dean position, Wolch was the founder and director of the Center for Sustainable Cities at the University of Southern California. She received her Ph.D. in urban planning from Princeton University, her dissertation focusing on urban social policy and planning, human-animal relations, cultural diversity and attitudes toward animals and urban sustainability.

== Awards ==
- Residency at the Center for Advanced Study in the Behavioral Sciences, 1995–1996
- USC Raubenheimer Outstanding Senior Faculty Award, 1997
- Guggenheim Fellowship Recipient, 1997
- Rockefeller Fellowship Recipient, Residential Fellow at the Rockefeller Foundation's Bellagio Center in Italy, 2003
- Distinguished Scholarship Honors by the Association of American Geographers, 2005

== Works ==
- Wolch, J. R., Dear, M. J. (1987). Landscapes of Despair: From Deinstitutionalization to Homelessness. Princeton, New Jersey: Princeton University Press. ISBN 9780691601403
- Wolch, J. R., Dear, M. J. (1989). The Power of Geography: How Territory Shapes Social Life. Unwin Hyman. ISBN 0044450567
- Wolch, J. R. (1990). The Shadow State: Government and Voluntary Sector in Transition. Foundation Center. ISBN 0879543310
- Wolch, J. R., Dear, M. J. (1993). Malign Neglect: Homelessness in an American City (Jossey Bass Public Administration Series). Jossey Bass Wiley. ISBN 155542564X
- Wolch, J. R., Emel, J. (1998). Animal Geographies: Place, Politics and Identity in the Nature-Culture Borderlands. Verso. ISBN 1859841376
- Wolch, J. R., Pascale Joassart-Marcelli, Alejandro Alonso & Nathan Sessoms (2005). "Spatial Segregation of the Poor in Southern California: A Multidimensional Analysis". Urban Geography, 26(7):587-609, doi:10.2747/0272-3638.26.7.587
