= University of Arizona School of Geography, Development and Environment =

University of Arizona school of geography

University of Arizona School of Geography, Development, & Environment
- Established: 1961
- Parent institution: University of Arizona
- Location: Tucson, Arizona, United States
- Campus: Urban
- Website: geography.arizona.edu

The University of Arizona School of Geography, Development and Environment is an academic department and professional school for geographical education and urban and regional development, GIS, development practice, and environmental studies. Degrees conferred include Bachelor of Arts (BA), Bachelor of Science (BS), Master of Arts (MA), Master of Science (MS), and Doctor of Philosophy (PhD).

As of the 2022 Academic Ranking of World Universities, the School of Geography at the University of Arizona ranks 6th in the U.S. and 39th in the world.

The school's research centers have contributed to global climate change adaption interventions and policy, including the Intergovernmental Panel on Climate Change (IPCC) Special Report on Global Warming of 1.5 °C.

The school's faculty include noted feminist theorist and past president of the American Association of Geographers Janice Monk, critical climatologist and IPCC member Diana Liverman, paleoclimatologist Jessica Tierney, criminologist and author Stefano Bloch, social geographer Sallie A. Marston, and radical scholar and activist Marv Waterstone – co-author of Consequences of Capitalism (2021) with Noam Chomsky.
