= Stefano Bloch =

American author

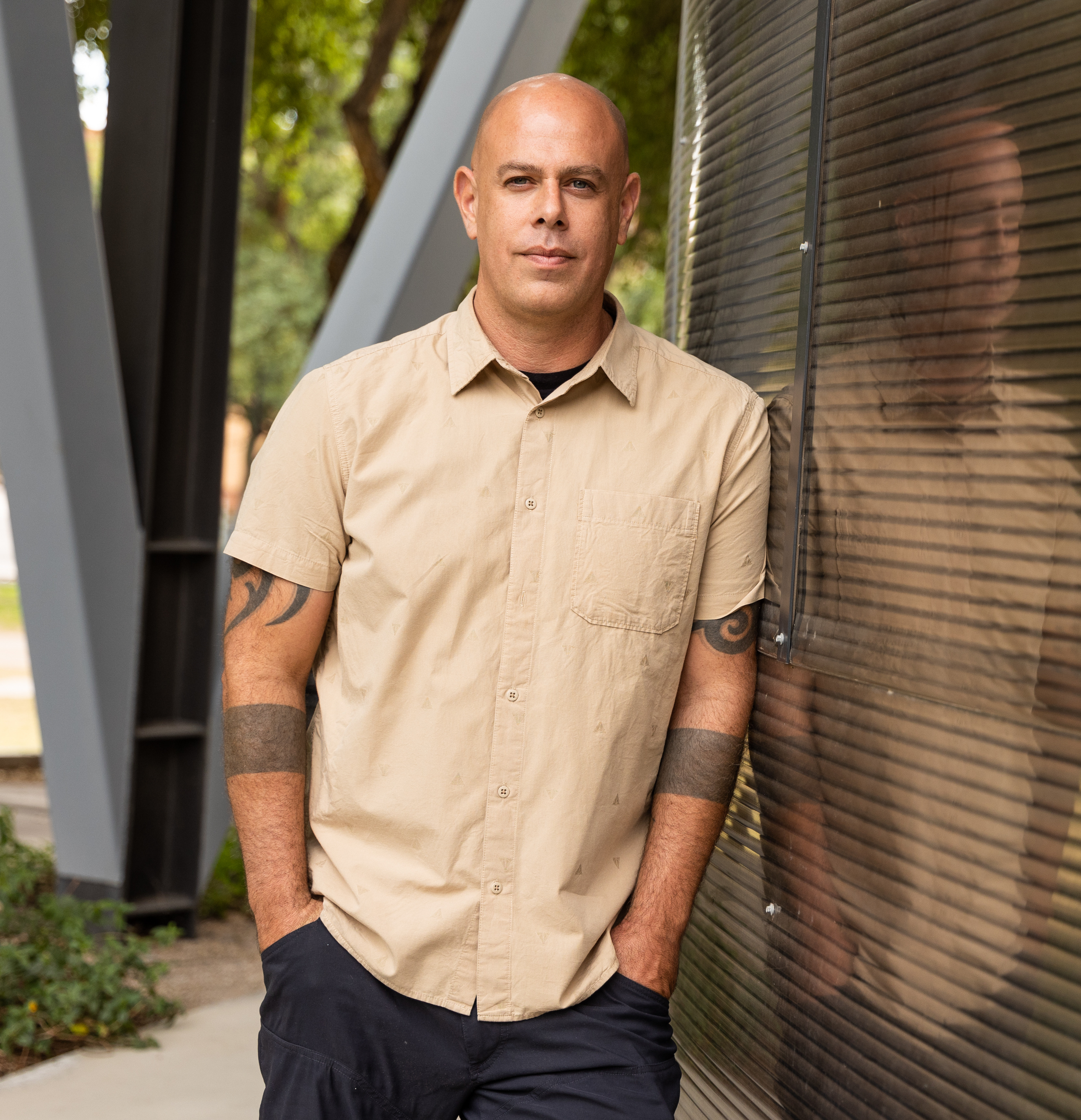
- Bloch in 2021
- Born: Los Angeles, California, U.S.
- Occupations: Author, Educator, and Tenured Professor of Geography, Latin American Studies, and Social, Cultural and Critical Theory

Academic background
- Education: University of Minnesota (Ph.D.); UCLA (M.A.); UC Santa Cruz (B.A.); Los Angeles Valley College (A.A.)
- Doctoral advisor: Edward W. Soja

Academic work
- School or tradition: Los Angeles School
- Institutions: University of Arizona; Brown University
- Main interests: Cultural geography, cultural criminology, gangs, graffiti, social theory, gentrification, autoethnography
- Notable ideas: Los Angeles graffiti styles, "Going All City," urban autoethnography

Stefano Bloch is an American author and professor of cultural geography and critical criminology at the University of Arizona who focuses on graffiti, prisons, the policing of public space, and gang activity.

Bloch is the author of Going All City: Struggle and Survival in LA's Graffiti Subculture published by University of Chicago Press, and appears in the documentaries Bomb It, Vigilante Vigilante: The Battle for Expression, and "Can't Be Stopped" as "Cisco." Times Higher Education identifies Bloch as "one of LA's most prolific (and, in some circles, legendary) graffiti writers."

Stefano Bloch is Associate Professor and Director of Graduate Studies for the University of Arizona School of Geography, Development and Environment in the College of Social and Behavioral Sciences, and faculty member in the Center for Latin American Studies and the Graduate Interdisciplinary Program in Social, Cultural, and Critical Theory.

Bloch is a graffiti historian and provides expert witness testimony on criminal cases focusing on gang activity, identity, and graffiti.

Bloch's research and commentary on urban space and protest has been quoted in Smithsonian and his research and perspectives on graffiti have been quoted in the Los Angeles Times, New York Times, Washington Post, NBC news, and in other media including Smithsonian Magazine and in interviews with NPR Morning Edition, LAist and the Los Angeles Lakers on NBA.com in which Bloch discusses graffiti in LA and the Lakers' impact on the street art scene, crediting the Lakers organization and its players with bringing some sense of unity to an otherwise racially and economically divided city.

In 2024, Bloch's commentaries on violent crime trends and "the most dangerous drug on campus" were published in the Arizona Daily Star.

The September 2024 issue of Psychology Today credits Professor Bloch's research with "shedding light on a historically maligned subculture and helps outsiders understand the deeply human motivations that compel graffiti artists, most of them young and marginalized, to pick up their paint and head out into the night."

== Education and career ==
Bloch was an Andrew W. Mellon Postdoctoral Fellow at the Brown University Cogut Center for the Humanities, and Presidential Diversity Fellow and a Senior Research Associate in the Urban Studies Program at Brown University.

Bloch worked under the socio-spatial theorist, urbanist, and co-founder of the Los Angeles School, Edward Soja. As a graduate researcher in the Department of Urban Planning within the UCLA Luskin School of Public Affairs, Bloch collaborated on Soja's My Los Angeles and Seeking Spatial Justice.

Bloch is a member of the American Association of Geographers, the American Society of Criminology, the UA Center for Latin American Studies, the Institute for LGBT Studies, and is an executive board member of the Graduate Interdisciplinary Program in Social, Cultural, and Critical Theory at the University of Arizona.

Bloch's writing on gang member identification appeared as an op-ed in The New York Times and his work on police shootings involving pet dogs co-authored with sociologist Daniel E. Martinez appeared in Slate.com.

== Scholarly writing ==
According to the editors of the Oxford Handbook of Gangs and Society, Bloch's research "infuses cultural geography with critical criminology to advocate for the inclusion of gangs and gang members in geographical theories of space and place. He contends that a deeper understanding of notions of territoriality and neighborhood would benefit geography generally and gang research specifically. [He] charts the path forward for how to make 'geography a home for gang studies.'”

Professor Bloch's research on policing, carcerality, race, and displacement has been published in academic journals including Antipode (journal) (2021) with Enrique Alan Olivares-Pelayo, Geography Compass (2021), Critical Criminology (journal) (2020), Progress in Human Geography (2020), in Urban Studies (journal) with anthropologist Susan A. Phillips, Environment and Planning, Dialogues in Urban Research, Antipode (journal), Human Geography on Edward W. Soja, and in other scholarly venues.

In a 2018 article published in the Journal of Contemporary Ethnography, Bloch coined the term "place based elicitation" to describe interviewing techniques that allow for reflexive, in-situ expression by members of criminal subcultures.

Bloch's 2024 peer-reviewed research on the use of civil law to circumvent people's constitutional protections is published in the Antipode (journal).

== Praise for Going All City ==
Linguist and activist Noam Chomsky hails Going All City as "a vivid autoethnography and a shattering account of life in the LA 'gang hoods – and the warmth and companionship that somehow survive the horrors.'" Writing:

Bloch provides a remarkable picture, presented with insight and sympathetic understanding."

Luis J. Rodriguez, former poet laureate, Chicano activist, and author of Always Running: La Vida Loca, Gang Days in L.A., writes:

Bloch knows how dangerous art can be for aerosol warriors: their imaginations arrested and expressions pathologized. He also elucidates the undeniable brilliance exploding on walls, utility poles, and underpasses.

Writing for the Los Angeles Review of Books in 2020, Ryan Gattis, author of All Involved" stated:

Stefano Bloch is the ultimate insider in an outsider subculture, a legend for his productivity and tirelessness... Few works explore L.A. with the depth that Going All City accomplishes—and, at 240 pages, so economically—while also touching on the importance of art, the difficulties of family, and the struggle to belong. . . It is a work not simply of insight and gravity, but also of unflinching wisdom regarding those deemed to be the least of society."

According to author and cultural criminologist Jeff Ferrell, writing for Times Higher Education:

Page after page of this tensely engaging memoir documents Bloch's elaborate, daily remapping of streets, blocks and neighbourhoods along shifting coordinates of physical access, subcultural status, public visibility and the daily dangers offered up by street gangs and the police."

Chaz Bojorquez, the "god father of Chicano graffiti," calls Stefano Bloch "the first true graffiti writer scholar, tagging his story and name on the walls inside your mind."

Susan A. Phillips, noted anthropologist and author of Wallbangin', Operation Flytrap, and The City Beneath states:

Going All City is an amazing read that is impossible to put down. A cutting-edge geographical exploration of under-examined Los Angeles landscapes, this poignant, insightful book is unique within graffiti scholarship and expansive in our understanding of the city. Depicting the pain of a childhood spent in poverty, the ambiguity of race, and the subjective experience of policing and gangs, this is the remarkable story of just one of thousands of young people who have found power in the clandestine practice of graffiti.

The Minneapolis Star Tribune states that "Stefano Bloch's memoir about growing up in 1990s Los Angeles, is a surprising and intimate look inside the life of a graffiti writer."

According to the Times Literary Supplement in London:

Stefano Bloch offers a riveting, eye-opening insight into the formative years of Cisco, one of the most prolific taggers in Los Angeles during the 1990s. These days Cisco is better known in the rarefied circles of academia: Cisco is Bloch himself, now a distinguished ethnographer and professor of cultural geography. As a teenager, however, he was obsessed with the phrase that lends the book its title. To go all city is to saturate visible surfaces with one's tag throughout a conurbation – a challenging but effective way of gaining the admiration of other graffiti writers (aka "bombers" or simply "writers") and even the tacit respect of hostile gangs…a valuable and enlightening means of better understanding the dynamics behind tagging.

Writing for KCET, Mike Sonksen states:

Bloch's autoethnography is not only one of the most compelling books ever written about writing graffiti, it is one of the best memoirs of someone growing up in the San Fernando Valley.

For Alex S. Vitale, author of The End of Policing:

Bloch unflinchingly peels back all the layers of artifice, hype, and sensationalism to reveal a stark portrait of struggling to survive and make meaning in a landscape of disorder and deprivation.

As written in a featured review of Going All City in the Annals of the American Association of Geographers in 2020:

It would be difficult to find an author better credentialed than Bloch to write about subverting urban geography. As a graffiti artist, he was writing in the landscape, and as chance would have it, he has become a geographer who writes on the landscape, now teaching at the University of Arizona. . . . Going All City is a refreshing piece of modern geography, and an excellent addition to the still growing conversations on spatial justice in the United States.

In Hyperallergic, critic and art historian Bridget Quinn calls Going All City "that rarest text, both a gripping memoir of life on the street, as well as an academic treatise."

== Personal life ==
As stated in his 2019 memoir, Going All City, Bloch attended North Hollywood High School as Stefano Sykes, a name given to him. Under his pseudonym, Cisco, Bloch is a member of the Los Angeles-based CBS graffiti crew and former writing partner of Mear One, and appears in the 2022 documentary Can't Be Stopped.

As Cisco, Bloch is widely credited as an innovator of 1990s-era graffiti writing styles including "topless letters" and "top-to-bottom freeway silvers," and is known as "one of LA's most prolific (and, in some circles, legendary) graffiti writers" according to Times Higher Education.

His father, Gregory Bloch, who died in 1988 from AIDS, was violinist (It's a Beautiful Day, Premiata Forneria Marconi, Saturday Night Live Band). His paternal grandfather is clarinetist Kalman Bloch. His paternal aunt is Michele Zukovsky. From his paternal grandmother, Frances Heifetz Bloch, he is related to violinist Jascha Heifetz. Through Jascha, his second-cousin once-removed, is drummer Danny Heifetz. He is also distantly related to violinist Daniel Heifetz and academic Ronald Heifetz.

Bloch lives with his family in Los Angeles, California and Tucson, Arizona.

== Works ==
- Bloch, Stefano (2019). "Going All City: Struggle and Survival in LA's Graffiti Subculture". Chicago: University of Chicago Press. ISBN 978-0226493442
