= Ghost Pitùr =

Italian artist

- Born: Brescia, Lombardy, Italy
- Occupation: Artist
- Years active: 2025-present

Ghost Pitùr is an Italian artist of unknown identity, who cleans and repaints walls vandalized by graffiti. He is active during the night in the city of Brescia, Lombardy, and has been portrayed in media as a superhero.

Ghost Pitùr hides his identity by wearing a hoodie and not showing his face in the videos he posts on his social media accounts. The only information he provided about himself is that he was born and raised in Brescia, was aged in his 30s as of 2026, and works as a professional painter, undertaking façade restoration work at night. He has stated that he does not seek fame or recognition, and that "good deeds should be done in silence, without profit and without wanting to get anything in return". Monocle has described him as an "anti-Banksy".

After repainting the walls, Ghost Pitùr leaves a note saying "Questo è un atto d’amore urbano" [This is an act of urban love].

In an interview, he has expressed that he is not against urban art in general: "When I see a well-done piece of work, with a message, a plan, a chosen color, a true artistic intention, I stop. I like it. I would never touch it".

In May 2026 it was reported that Ghost Pitùr cleaned a graffiti from a wall on Piazza Castello, in Turin.

== See also ==
- Gray Ghost (vigilante)
