= Edward Soja =

American urban planner and geographer (1940–2015)

Edward William Soja
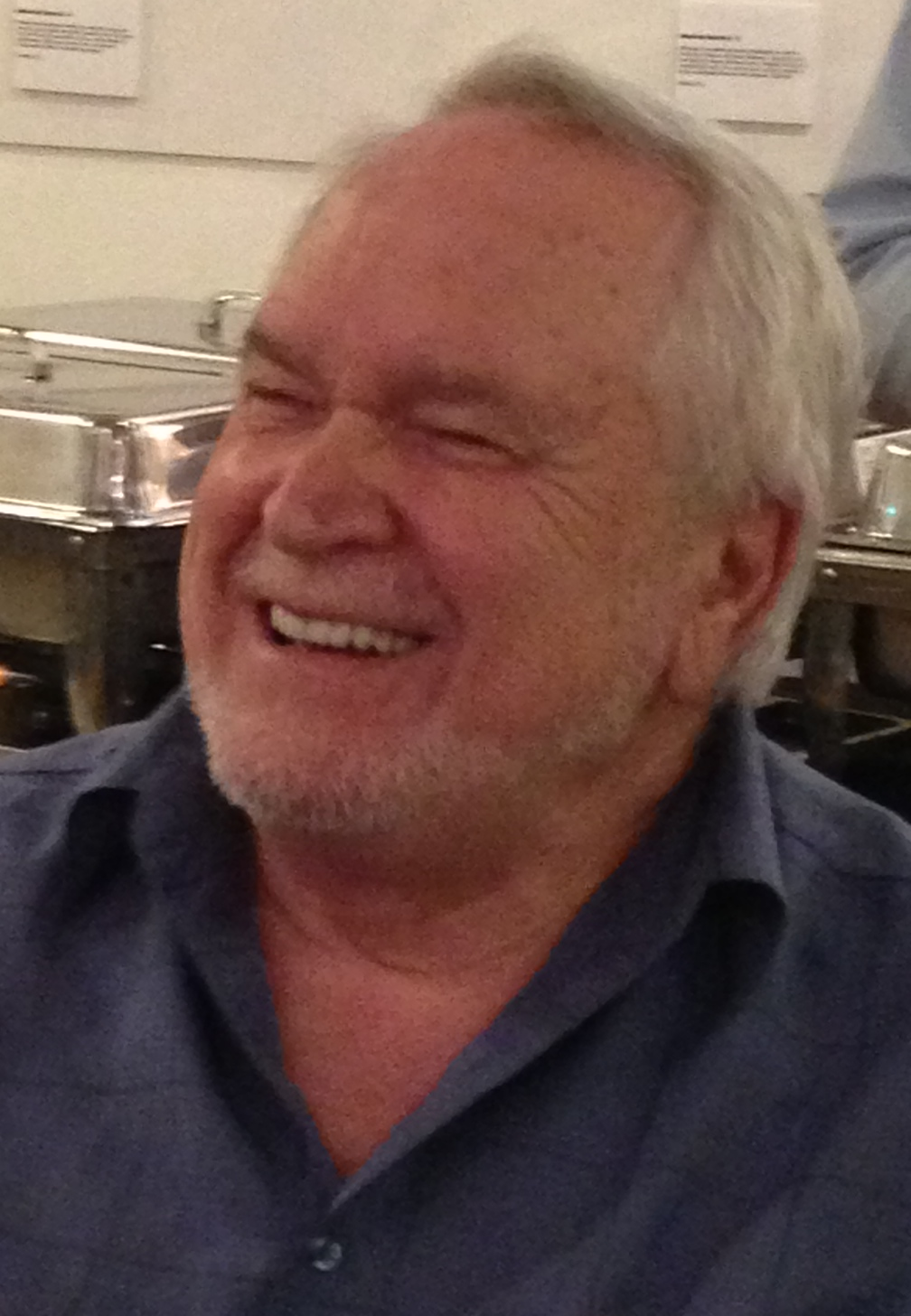
- Soja in Singapore in 2013
- Born: May 4, 1940; New York City, U.S.
- Died: November 1, 2015 (aged 75); Los Angeles, California, U.S.
- Awards: Vautrin Lud Prize

Academic work
- Discipline: Geography
- Institutions: UCLA
- Notable ideas: Thirdspace

Edward William Soja (/ˈsoʊdʒə/; May 4, 1940 – November 1, 2015) was an urbanist, a postmodern political geographer and urban theorist. He worked on socio-spatial dialectic and spatial justice.

== Biography ==
Edward Soja received his Ph.D. degree from Syracuse University. He worked for the Graduate School of Architecture and Urban Planning at UCLA since 1972, where he was a Distinguished Professor of Urban Planning. He had also been a visiting professor at the London School of Economics.

Soja's early research focused on planning in Kenya, but he came to be known as the world's leading spatial theorist with a distinguished career writing on spatial formations and social justice. In addition to his readings of American feminist cultural theorist bell hooks (1952-2021), and French intellectual Michel Foucault (1926–1984), Soja's greatest contribution to spatial theory and the field of cultural geography is his use of the work of French Marxist urban sociologist Henri Lefebvre (1901–1991), author of The Production of Space (1974). Soja updated Lefebvre's concept of the spatial triad with his own concept of spatial trialectics which includes Thirdspace, or spaces that are both real and imagined.

Soja focuses his critical postmodern analysis of space and society, or what he calls spatiality, on the people and places of Los Angeles. In 2010 the University of Minnesota Press released his work on spatial justice, which was followed in 2014 with his My Los Angeles published by the University of California Press. He also published in the critical urban theory journal City: analysis of urban trends, culture, theory, policy, action.

Soja collaborated on research and writing with, most notably, Allen J. Scott (UCLA), Michael Storper (UCLA, London School of Economics), Fredric Jameson (Duke University), David Harvey (Johns Hopkins, CUNY), Kurt Iveson (University of Sydney), and various faculty in the departments of Urban Planning, Architecture, Policy Studies, and Geography at UCLA.

Soja served as the doctoral academic advisor to many leading scholars in the field of urban theory and geography including Professor Mustafa Dikec (École d'Urbanisme de Paris), Dr. Walter J. Nicholls (University of California, Irvine), Dr. Mark Purcell (University of Washington), Dr. Diane Davis (Harvard University), Dr. Juan Miguel Kanai (University of Sheffield) and Dr. Stefano Bloch (University of Arizona).

In 2015 he was awarded the Vautrin Lud Prize, the highest honor for a geographer and often called the Nobel Prize in the field of geography.

== Thirdspace ==
Soja's theory of Thirdspace sees three urban spaces: Firstspace, Secondspace and Thirdspace. Firstspace is the physical built environment, which can be mapped, quantifiably measured and 'seen' in the real world. It is the product of planning laws, political decisions and urban change over time. Secondspace is conceptual space- how that space is conceived in the minds of the people who inhabit it. It is a product of marketing strategies, (re-)imaging and social norms that determine how people might act or behave in that space. Thirdspace is 'real and imagined' space, lived space, the way that people actually live in and experience that urban space. This is action in the real space (Firstspace) enacted through the expectations of the Secondspace.

In Thirdspace "everything comes together… subjectivity and objectivity, the abstract and the concrete, the real and the imagined, the knowable and the unimaginable, the repetitive and the differential, structure and agency, mind and body, consciousness and the unconscious, the disciplined and the transdisciplinary, everyday life and unending history." As he explains, "I define Thirdspace as an-Other way of understanding and acting to change the spatiality of human life, a distinct mode of critical spatial awareness that is appropriate to the new scope and significance being brought about in the rebalanced trialectics of spatiality–historicality–sociality." Soja constructs Thirdspace from the spatial trialectics established by Henri Lefebvre in The Production of Space and Michel Foucault's concept of heterotopia. He synthesizes these theories with the work of postcolonial thinkers from Gayatri Chakravorty Spivak to bell hooks, Edward Said to Homi Bhabha.

Sometimes called a mystical Marxist, Soja demonstrates leanings towards a monadic mysticism in his Thirdspace. He formulates Thirdspace by analogy with the Aleph, a concept of spatial infinity developed by Jorge Luis Borges. Thirdspace is a radically inclusive concept that encompasses epistemology, ontology, and historicity in continuous movement beyond dualisms and toward "an-Other": as Soja explains, "thirding produces what might best be called a cumulative trialectics that is radically open to additional otherness, to a continuing expansion of spatial knowledge." Thirdspace is a transcendent concept that is constantly expanding to include "an-Other," thus enabling the contestation and re-negotiation of boundaries and cultural identity. Soja here closely resembles Homi Bhabha's Third Space Theory, in which "all forms of culture are continually in a process of hybridity," that "displaces the histories that constitute it, and sets up new structures of authority, new political initiatives… The process of cultural hybridity gives rise to something different, something new and unrecognizable, a new area of negotiation of meaning and representation."

Soja's work on Thirdspace has inspired thinking in the field of Geography Education, specifically utilising the spaces of Firstspace, Secondspace and Thirdspace to help school aged students to learn about urban geography. This work has been extended to look at how Thirdspace might be of use as a concept to help students in urban fieldwork.

== Visions for Los Angeles ==
Soja introduced six visions for the City of Los Angeles. These are the following:

- Flexicity: Deindustrialization has been occurring alongside a potent reindustrialization process built not just on high technology.
- Cosmopolis: The primacy of globalization. Globalization of culture, labor and capital. Reworlds the city.
- Exopolis: The city that no longer conveys the traditional qualities of cityness. No cityness about Los Angeles. Growth of the outer city and city edges. More urban life.
- Metropolarities: Increasing social inequalities, widening income gaps, new kinds of social polarization and satisfaction that fit uncomfortably within traditional dualisms based on class or race, as well as conventional. New underclass debate.
- Carcereal Archipelagos: A fortified city with bulging prisons. The City of Quartz. More surveillance.
- Simcity: A place where simulations of a presumably real world increasingly capture and activate our urban imaginary and infiltrate urban life. An electronic generation of hyperreality.

== Selected publications ==
- Postmodern Geographies: The Reassertion of Space in Critical Social Theory. London: Verso Press, 1989.
- Scott, A.J and E.W. Soja, eds. The City: Los Angeles and Urban Theory at the End of the Twentieth Century. Berkeley: University of California Press. 1996.
- Thirdspace: Journeys to Los Angeles and Other Real-and-Imagined Places. Oxford: Basil Blackwell. 1996.
- Postmetropolis: Critical Studies of Cities and Regions. Oxford: Basil Blackwell, 2000.
- "Writing the city spatially", City, November 2003.
- "The city and spatial justice", Justice spatiale | Spatial Justice, n° September 1, 2009.
- Seeking Spatial Justice. Minneapolis: University of Minnesota Press. 2010.
- "Towards a regional democracy?",Métropolitiques, March 2011.
- "Spatial Justice and the Right to the City: an Interview with Edward Soja", Justice spatiale | Spatial Justice, n° March 3, 2011.
- My Los Angeles: From Urban Restructuring to Regional Urbanization. Berkeley: University of California Press. 2014.

== Interviews and Writing about Edward Soja ==
- Edward W Soja's radical spatial perspective by Stephano Bloch and Thomas Brasdefer (2023)
- Edward Soja: geographical imagination from the margin to the core by Margarida Queirós (2016)
- Watch This Space: An Interview with Edward Soja - Gareth Evans, Tara McPherson, Edward Soja (1991)
- Edward Soja interviewed by Professor Isabel Capeloa Gil. Lisbon Consortium, Summer School. (2011
- Spatial Justice and the Right to the City: an Interview with Edward SOJA by Frédéric Dufaux | Philippe Gervais-Lambony | Chloé Buire | Henri Desbois (2010)

== See also ==
- Edgelands
- Social production of space
- Synekism
- Los Angeles School
