= Katharyne Mitchell =

American geographer and social sciences academic

Katharyne Mitchell is an American geographer who is currently a Distinguished Professor of Sociology and previously the Dean of the Social Sciences at the University of California, Santa Cruz.

== Background ==
Mitchell grew up in Boston, Massachusetts and graduated from Princeton University with a B.A. in Art and Archaeology. She received her M.A. and Ph.D. in Geography from the University of California, Berkeley under the direction of Allan Pred. Mitchell was previously Professor of Geography at the University of Washington, and held the inaugural position as Simpson Professor of the Public Humanities from 2004 to 2007. She was a visiting professor at St. Catherine's College and Hertford College at the University of Oxford in 2000–2001.

== Scholarship ==
The recipient of Guggenheim Foundation and Brocher Foundation fellowships, as well as an Alexander von Humboldt Research Award and Max Planck Institute senior fellowship, Mitchell's research spans several categories including migration, citizenship, transnationalism, urban political geography, philanthropy, and education. Her current research examines the spaces of migration, faith, and sanctuary in the context of the current refugee situation in Europe.

Mitchell's 2004 book, Crossing the Neoliberal Line: Pacific Rim Migration and the Metropolis, is regarded as “an important contribution to urban and transnational studies.” Her 2008 edited volume, Practising Public Scholarship: Experiences and Possibilities Beyond the Academy, brings together work from scholars such as Terry Eagleton, Howard Zinn, Doreen Massey, and Michael Burawoy, and has been called “one of the best books on what it really means to be a public intellectual.”

== Key concepts ==
- Transnationalism – Throughout her career, Mitchell has developed a geographical understanding of transnational processes and discourses. Her early work developed a theory of transnationalism from a spatial ethnography of migration between Hong Kong and Canada and subsequent struggles over urban change in Vancouver, B.C. Called “innovative” and “empirically rich,” this ethnography demonstrated how the practices of Hong Kong Chinese transnational migrants to Pacific Rim cities like Vancouver complicate traditional assumptions of “citizenship,” “home,” and “national culture.” More recently, Mitchell's work has explored transnationalism in the context of spaces of sanctuary and church networking for migrants and refugees in Europe. She has also developed the concept of transnational topologies, according to which borders and territories are not fixed but continuously maintained, challenged, and redefined.
- Diaspora – Mitchell has critiqued the assumption that the diasporic is necessarily equated with a politically progressive agenda. She shows how, within cultural studies, diaspora has been celebrated as a subversive “third space,” along with related concepts like hybridity and liminality. However, the focus on diaspora as a linguistic and cultural disruption to hegemonic norms, Mitchell argues, neglects the ways in which diasporic and other liminal subject positions have been used strategically for purposes of capital accumulation. While maintaining the diasporic as a potential site of resistance, Mitchell cautions against the uncritical affirmation of such third spaces.
- Multiculturalism – Mitchell's critical account of multiculturalism views the latter as both a liberal concept and a potential site of political resistance. On the one hand, Mitchell has shown how concepts of multicultural citizenship and multicultural education emerged in Canada, and to a lesser extent in the US and UK, after World War II as part of a larger set of policies and discourses surrounding the liberal state. In places like Vancouver, doctrines of multiculturalism have attempted to smooth racial friction and subdue resistance to capitalist development and various forms of governance. However, particularly in her work on education, Mitchell has shown how the concepts and practices of multiculturalism have shifted in response to the spatial, digital, cultural, and economic transformations of neoliberal globalization. Given the political-economic contexts of globalization, she argues that engagements with multiculturalism today can have potentially progressive outcomes if grounded in real-world practices. Mitchell has demonstrated this in her own experimentations with strategies of multicultural education. In teaching students mapping skills, she found that they were better able to challenge forms of spatial injustice and to acknowledge different ways of being, doing, and knowing.

== Selected recent publications ==
- 2025. The Politics of Revenge: Revanchist Populism in San Francisco and the United States (co-authored with Gregory Woolston). Antipode . https://doi.org/10.1111/anti.70037
- 2024. Philanthropy, Neoliberalism, and the University (co-authored with Gregory Woolston). Human Geography. https://doi.org/10.1177/19427786241300080 .
- 2023. The Routledge International Handbook of Critical Philanthropy and Humanitarianism (co-edited with Polly Pallister-Wilkins). London: Routledge.
- 2022. Sanctuary Space, Racialized Violence, and Memories of Resistance (coauthored with Key MacFarlane). Annals of the American Association of Geographers.
- 2019. Handbook on Critical Geographies of Migration (co-edited with Reece Jones and Jennifer Fluri). London: Edward Elgar Press.
- 2018. Making Workers: Radical Geographies of Education. London: Pluto Press.
- 2016. The New Washington Consensus: Millennial Philanthropy and the Making of Global Market Subjects (coauthored with Matthew Sparke). Antipode 48(3): 724–749.
