= Intercultural theatre =

Intercultural theater, also known as cross-cultural theatre, may transcend time, while mixing and matching cultures or subcultures. Mixing and matching is the unavoidable process in the making of inner connections and the presentations of interculturalities. The majority of the works in intercultural theatre deal basically with thinking and doing around the themes, stories, pre-performative or performative concepts of Asian classical theatre or traditional performing arts forms and practices, mixing and matching the concepts or the ideas of the foreign. After the well-known success of Peter Brook's production of the Mahabharata, the trend has been evolving tremendously around the globe and many the cultural institutions of many governments have become directly interested in pushing the boundaries of intercultural senses and sensitivities by financially investing on new theatrical productions, university research, conferences and fellowships

== Three major groups ==
=== Imitational theatre ===
The intended audience is from the same culture, or a foreign audience from a different culture and the theater group, or the actors or performers, come from the same cultural background or from very diverse foreign cultural backgrounds. The production may imitate foreign styles, the production procedures may introduce new techniques, a new style of acting or a new style of presentation for a group of actors from various cultures or the same culture, the production may include foreign languages, costumes, scenic themes and other aspects. There are many examples of intercultural theatre groups, people, and institutions who are experimenting with various levels of mixing and matching of traditional or contemporary aspects of theatre training and presentations in this type of Imitational Theatre.

After the global acceptance of renowned theatre director Peter Brook, many theatre directors went after Asian traditional theatre art forms and other Asian representational systems, in order to develop and portray their own theatre presentations using, or somehow capitalizing on the actor training systems and scenic representations belonging to those particular Asian theatres, such as the Noh theatre, Kathakali, Chinese opera etcetera. While Peter Brook was successful in his approach to a universally accepted vision of theatre-making through the Asian theatre systems—beyond the parameters of imitating different theatrical topics—many other younger institutions or directorial approaches are kept within the parameters of imitations or comparisons, or only exchanges of physical exercises.

=== Adaptive theatre ===
There are two types of intercultural theatre within adapted theatre. One can consider "the norm" to represent what the audience of a certain culture expects/has typically been exposed to:

- Adapts to the norm – traditional style productions that have been consciously adapted to fit with the cultural expectations of the intended audience of another culture.
- Adapts away from the norm – the original culture dominates but it borrows foreign elements to enlarge the range of expression (e.g. TheatreWorks (Singapore) and Ong Keng Sen; International Centre for Theatre Research and Peter Brook; and The Bridge – Stage of the Arts)

=== Universal theatre ===
The aim of universal theatre is to be recognized and accepted by audience members from a wide range of cultural backgrounds (e.g. The Mahabharata, Peter Brook, Hiroshi Koike Bridge Project- The Mahabharata, Bari Hochwald The Global Theatre Project, The World Theatre Project, People's Theatre Project etc.)

== Sub-divisions ==
Globalization supported in the developments of intercultural theatre in various directions and evolutions of point of views by the theatre practitioners, scholars, funders and producers (British Council, Fulbright, Ford foundation, The Rockefeller foundation) particularly using English language as the main medium of communication for knowing, acknowledging, debating, reasoning, considering, teaching, learning, writing, speaking, adapting, translating or transforming the one culture to the other culture in large contexts and in detailed micro contexts. Primarily the discourses of intercultural theatre practice developed out of the re-source influences of western theatre arts, western theoreticians and western theatre practitioners.

=== American intercultural theatre ===
- For many theatre cultures, American intercultural theatre has given the possibilities of new exchanges, experiments, researches and pioneer introductions of model attempts in theatre making. There are many directors, teachers or theatre artists began working with the sources of American point of views in the intercultural attempts and some of them are Richard Schechner, Phillip Zarilli, Robert Wilson, Christian DuComb, Esther Kim Lee, Ellen Stewart-La MaMa, Lee Breuer-Mabou Mines, Hugh Gittens, Anne Bogart, Philip Glass etc.

== Non-Native English language speaking countries intercultural theatre ==
- English is the primary medium of communication in the intercultural theatre scene worldwide and American English or British English used as the mother source language to make all transactions related with theatre training, teaching and performing. Many non English countries have welcomed the English language as the official medium for the citizens and thus opened possibilities of any business. The culture is also part of business in the sense of in-coming and out-going, travelling or transforming stories, experiences, music, histories and philosophies. The dramatic theories and the acting coaching is mainly developed by the American or European masters of contemporary theatre. The non native English language speaking cultures supported the new experiences, exchanges, experiments to present the new shows.

=== Chinese intercultural theatre ===
- Chinese Shakespeare
- Chinese Greek Tragedy

=== Korean intercultural theatre ===
Adaptations of Shakespearian works such as 'Hamlet' with traditional Korean elements

== Criticism ==
- Intercultural theatre criticism is a new term that presents a collection of critical research engagements, openings, discourses, quotations about Intercultural theatre and its productions, projects, people and places, which illustrate critically the necessities and the reputations.

=== Directors ===
- Intercultural theatre director

Intercultural theatre director is a stage director/instructor specialized in the intercultural theatre field who oversees every creative aspects of occupation towards a theatre production (text based play, non-text based play, myths & stories, adaptation of a play or a devised piece of artistic work) through the medium of exchange or borrowing diverse elements from less known culture, practice mixing or collaborating with one or plural different well-known cultural elements or practices and vice versa to have quality and completeness in the realization. The intercultural director will lead the creative members of the team to achieve his/her artistic vision for the production and objectively collaborate with the various mixing elements of performance, classical drama, Forms of drama, Twentieth-century theatre, literature, languages, translations, music, stage craft, costume design, acting, acting techniques, props, stage combat, set design and light design for the intercultural production.

=== Scholars ===
- Intercultural theatre scholars are the experts working with intercultural theatre creations for several years of practical and theoretical experiences in productions, teachings, performing arts etc.

=== Critics ===
- Intercultural theatre critics are the experienced scholars who have many years of academic scholarships and direct relations with the each details of culture, civilization, practices. They are capable to inform, debate, talk, analyze and write about what commonly not presented or re-presented on the table.
- Patrice Pavis French-UK theatre scholar,
- Min Tian central academy of drama in Beijing, China
- Rustom Bharucha Indian theatre critic, India
- Marcus Cheng Chye Tan, Singapore theatre scholar

== Sources ==
- International Yearbook for Research in Arts Education 3/2015: The Wisdom of the Many – Key issues in Arts Education
- Intercultural Experiential Education
- Making the Most of Intercultural Education
- Performance and interculturalism now
- Section VI: Kunst und "Globalisierung" / Gabriele Pfeiffer (Wien)
- The Intercultural Performance Reader, by Patrice Pavis on Amazon.co.uk
- DRM0730 – INTERCULTURAL THEATRE
- Into the wormhole
- "The Steveston Noh Project"
