= Urban Studies Foundation =

- Abbreviation: USF
- Formation: 2008; 18 years ago
- Type: charity
- Legal status: foundation
- Purpose: urban research
- Location: Glasgow, Scotland
- Official language: English
- Affiliations: Urban Studies (journal)
- Website: urbanstudiesfoundation.org

The Urban Studies Foundation (USF) is a charity and research foundation based in Glasgow, United Kingdom. The USF provides grant funding to support academic research, education, and knowledge mobilisation in the field of urban studies. The foundation is closely-connected with its commercial subsidiary, the Urban Studies Journal.

The USF provides grant funding globally, and has supported postdoctoral scholars, institutions, and projects all around the world. Support schemes include a Seminar Series Awards grant to support scholarship focused on contemporary topics in urban research. The USF also offers grants aimed specifically at researchers from the Global South.

The USF also supports knowledge mobilisation projects, and has recently supported the production of several documentaries, such as Territory (2025).
