= Susan A. Phillips =

American anthropologist

- Born: 1969 (age 56–57)

Academic background
- Education: California State University, Dominguez Hills
- Alma mater: University of California, Los Angeles
- Thesis: The politics of Los Angeles gang graffiti (1998)

Academic work
- Discipline: Anthropology
- Institutions: Pitzer College
- Main interests: Graffiti
- Notable works: The City Beneath

Susan A. Phillips (born 1969) is an American anthropologist and criminologist who works as a professor of environmental analysis at Pitzer College. She is known for research on graffiti, and her books on gangs and graffiti.

Dr. Phillips' article on redlining and gang neighborhoods in Los Angeles with Professor Stefano Bloch was shortlisted as one of the best articles of 2022 in Urban Studies (journal).

== Education and career ==
Phillips graduated in 1990 from California State University, Dominguez Hills with a bachelor's degree in civilizations. She then went to the University of California, Los Angeles (UCLA) for graduate study in anthropology, earning a master's degree in 1994 and completing a Ph.D. in 1998.

After continuing at UCLA as a lecturer for four more years, and also working as a lecturer at the ArtCenter College of Design, she became an assistant professor at Pitzer College in 2002. In 2016, as an associate professor, she was named a Getty Scholar by the Getty Research Institute.

== Books ==
- Wallbangin': Graffiti and Gangs in L.A. (1999)
- Operation Fly Trap: L. A. Gangs, Drugs, and the Law (2012)
- The City Beneath: A Century of Los Angeles Graffiti (2019)
