= Third Space Theory =

Postcolonial sociolinguistic theory

The Third Space Theory is a sociolinguistic theory that describes a person or community's continuous process of negotiating their sense of culture and identity, as first defined by Homi K. Bhabha. A Third Space is often characterized as an undefined middle ground, where different elements of a person’s cultural and environmental realities can be cobbled together into a constantly-evolving framework for self-identification. The theory relies heavily on the principle of hybridity, and an interpretation of culture as liminal conversations between members and stakeholders.

See Edward W. Soja for a conceptualization of the term within the social sciences and from a critical urban theory perspective.

== Origins ==
Third Space theory emerges from the sociocultural tradition in psychology identified with Lev Vygotsky. Sociocultural approaches are concerned with the "... constitutive role of culture in mind, i.e., on how mind develops by incorporating the community's shared artifacts accumulated over generations". Bhabha applies socioculturalism directly to the postcolonial condition, where there are, "... unequal and uneven forces of cultural representation".

== Wider use ==
In discourse of dissent, the Third Space has come to have two interpretations:

- that space where the oppressed plot their liberation: the whispering corners of the tavern or the bazaar
- that space where oppressed and oppressor are able to come together, free (maybe only momentarily) of oppression itself, embodied in their particularity.

In educational studies, Maniotes examined literary Third Space in a classroom where students' cultural capital merged with content of the curriculum as students backed up their arguments in literature discussions. Skerrett associates it with a multiliteracies approach.

Pre-school: Third Space Theory has been applied to the prespace within which children learn to read, bringing domestic and school literacy practices into their own constructions of literacy.

Another contemporary construction of three "spaces" is that one space is the domestic sphere: the family and the home; a second space is the sphere of civic engagement including school, work and other forms of public participation; and set against these is a Third Space where individual, sometimes professional, and sometimes transgressive acts are played out: where people let their "real" selves show.

Sporting associations may be labeled as Third Space. Often bars and nightclubs are so labeled (Law 2000, 46–47). Latterly the term Third Space has been appropriated into brand marketing where domestic spaces and workforce-engagement spaces are set against recreational retail space: shopping malls as third spaces (see Third place, Postrel 2006; and see also Davis 2008). Bill Thompson (2007) offers an opposite conceptualisation of Third Space as public, civic space in the built environment under pressure from shopping malls and corporate enterprises, transforming public space into an extension of the market.

Higher education: The Third Space is used by Whitchurch to describe a subset of staff in Higher Education that work in roles which cross the boundaries of professional/administrative and academic spheres, providing expert advice relating to learning and teaching without being practitioners. These include Learning/Instructional Designers and Education Technologists, among others.

== Explanatory and predictive use ==
Third Space Theory can explain some of the complexity of poverty, social exclusion and social inclusion, and might help predict what sort of initiatives would more effectively ameliorate poverty and exclusion. Bonds of affinity (class, kin, location: e.g. neighbourhood, etc.) can function as "poverty traps". Third Space Theory suggests that every person is a hybrid of their unique set of affinities (identity factors). Conditions and locations of social and cultural exclusion have their reflection in symbolic conditions and locations of cultural exchange. It appears to be accepted in policy that neither social capital nor cultural capital, alone or together, are sufficient to overcome social exclusion. Third Space Theory suggests that policies of remediation based in models of the Other are likely to be inadequate.

== See also ==
- Third place
- Hybridity
- World-systems theory
- Post-colonial theory
- Border
