= Jen Jack Gieseking =

- Website: jgieseking.org

Jen Jack Gieseking is an environmental psychologist, author, and associate professor of geography at the University of Kentucky.

Their first monograph, A Queer New York: Geographies of Lesbians, Dykes, and Queers, 1983–2008 was published in 2020 and won the 2021 Glenda Laws Award from the American Association of Geographers.

Gieseking is managing editor of ACME: International Journal of Critical Geography and contributor to the National Park Service's LGBTQ America: A Theme Study of Lesbian, Gay, Bisexual, Transgender, and Queer History. Other publications include: People, Place and Space Reader and a chapter in Queer Presences and Absences entitled "Queering the Meaning of 'Neighborhood': Reinterpreting the Lesbian-Queer Experience of Park Slope, Brooklyn, 1983–2008".

Gieseking has a bachelor's from Mount Holyoke College (1999), a master's from Union Theological Seminary (2004), and a PhD from the CUNY Graduate Center (2013).
