= Michael Dear =

Welsh geographer

- Occupations: urban geographer; professor, College of Environmental Design of the University of California, Berkeley
- Website: michaeljdear.com

Michael James Dear is an urban geographer and educator. He has written several books, including Why Walls Won't Work: Repairing the US-Mexico Divide, which was published by Oxford University Press in 2013. He teaches City and Regional Planning at the College of Environmental Design of the University of California, Berkeley.

== Life and work ==
Dear was born in Treorchy, Wales.

In 1988, he received a Guggenheim Fellowship.

He worked at the University of Southern California in Los Angeles.

He currently teaches City and Regional Planning at the College of Environmental Design of the University of California, Berkeley, in the United States (he has been at Berkeley since 2009). He is a fellow of the Bellagio Center of the Rockefeller Foundation at Villa Serbelloni on Lake Como in Lombardy, Italy, and of the Center for Advanced Study in the Behavioral Sciences of Stanford University in Stanford, California.

He is a fellow of the Learned Society of Wales.

== Publications ==
- The Postmodern Urban Condition. Blackwell/Wiley, 2000. ISBN 978-0-631-20988-1.
- Why Walls Won't Work: Repairing the US-Mexico Divide. Oxford University Press, 2013. ISBN 978-0199897988.
  - Oxford University Press, 2015. Paperback edition, with new chapter.

== See also ==
- Los Angeles School
