= Gray Ghost (vigilante) =

American vigilante (died 2021)

Fredrick Radtke (1945 or 1946 – 24 August 2021), better known by his moniker "Gray Ghost", was an American vigilante dedicated to covering illegal graffiti. He was active in New Orleans.

== Life ==
Radtke was born in Pennsylvania but lived in New Orleans for over forty years. He played on his high school football team and was a member of the U.S. Marine Corps.

In an interview, Radtke explained that he began combating graffiti in 1986, when he painted over tags left on a wall at New Orleans’ Greenwood Cemetery. The people responsible returned and repainted, but he painted over it again, making it clear he would continue as many times as necessary.

In 1997, he founded a nonprofit organization called Operation Clean Sweep, which sought to eliminate illegal graffiti from the streets of New Orleans. Over the years, the project erased more than 10,000 graffiti tags all over the city, including many historic sites.

He began being known as the Gray Ghost for the color of paint he uses.

In 2008, graffiti artist Banksy visited New Orleans "to do battle with the Gray Ghost". On his blog he stated that Gray Ghost has done "more damage to the culture of the city than any section hurricane would hope to achieve". Banksy left several murals in the city, one of them depicting the Gray Ghost.

In October 2008, Radtke was arrested for covering a graffiti-style mural in Faubourg Marigny that had been authorized by the wall's owner.

In 2011, he was featured in the documentary Vigilante Vigilante: The Battle for Expression, which profiled several American anti-graffiti vigilantes.

Radtke died on 24 August 2021, at the age of 76.

== See also ==
- Ghost Pitùr
