= Hybridity =

Mixture, in various contexts

Hybridity, in its most basic sense, refers to mixture. The term originates from biology and was subsequently employed in linguistics and in racial theory in the nineteenth century. Its contemporary uses are scattered across numerous academic disciplines and is salient in popular culture. Hybridity is used in discourses about race, postcolonialism, identity, anti-racism and multiculturalism, and globalization, developed from its roots as a biological term.

== In biology ==
In biology, a hybrid is the offspring resulting from combining the qualities of two organisms of different varieties, species or genera through sexual reproduction. Generally, it means that each cell has genetic material from two different organisms, whereas an individual where some cells are derived from a different organism is called a chimera. Hybrids are not always intermediates between their parents (such as in blending inheritance), but can show hybrid vigor, sometimes growing larger or taller than either parent. The concept of a hybrid is interpreted differently in animal and plant breeding, where there is interest in the individual parentage. In genetics, attention is focused on the numbers of chromosomes. In taxonomy, a key question is how closely related the parent species are.

Species are reproductively isolated by strong barriers to hybridization, which include genetic and morphological differences, differing times of fertility, mating behaviors and cues, and physiological rejection of sperm cells or the developing embryo. Some act before fertilization and others after it. Similar barriers exist in plants, with differences in flowering times, pollen vectors, inhibition of pollen tube growth, somatoplastic sterility, cytoplasmic-genic male sterility and the structure of the chromosomes. A few animal species and many plant species, however, are the result of hybrid speciation, including important crop plants such as wheat, where the number of chromosomes has been doubled

== As racial mixing ==
Hybridity is a cross between two separate races, plants or cultures. A hybrid is something that is mixed, and hybridity is simply mixture. Hybridity is not a new cultural or historical phenomenon. It has been a feature of all civilizations since time immemorial from the Sumerians through the Egyptians, Greeks and Romans to the present. Both ancient and modern civilizations have, through trade and conquests, borrowed foreign ideas, philosophies, and sciences, thus producing hybrid cultures and societies. The term hybridity itself is not a modern coinage. It was common among the Greeks and Romans.

In Latin, hybrida`, or ibrida, refers to "the offspring of a tame sow and a wild boar" and, by extension, to the progeny of a Roman and a non-Roman. The word hybridity was in use in English since the early 17th century and gained popular currency in the 19th century. Charles Darwin used the term in 1837 in reference to his experiments in cross-fertilization in plants. The concept of hybridity has been fraught with negative connotations from its incipience. The Greeks and the Romans borrowed extensively from other civilizations, the Egyptians and the Persians in particular, and created ipso facto hybridized cultures but regarded unfavourably biological hybridity. Aristotle, Plato and Pericles were all opposed to racial mixing between Greeks and "barbarians" and viewed biological hybridity as a source of racial degeneration and social disorder. Similarly, within the Roman Empire, which is considered as one of the most multi-ethnic empires, cultural difference was usually integrated into the predominant culture, but biological hybridity was condemned.

The Romans’ attitudes to racial mixing hardened in the 4th century AD, when Rome embraced the Christian faith. That is manifest in the Codex Theodosianus (AD365), which prohibited marriages between Christians and non-Christians, the Jews in particular, and inflicted death penalty on those who did not obey the law.

Contempt for biological hybridity did not end with the fall of the Roman Empire but continued throughout the Middle Ages and well into modern times, reaching a peak in the 19th century with the rise of Europe into an unrivalled imperial power. Hybridity and fear of racial degeneration caused by the mixing of Europeans and non-Europeans were major concerns in 19th century colonialist discourse prompted by racist pseudo-scientific discourses found in such works as Joseph Arthur de Gobineau's Essai sur l’inégalité des races and Joseph-Ernest Renan's L’Education culturelle et morale.

As an explicative term, hybridity became a useful tool in forming a fearful discourse of racial mixing that arose toward the end of the 18th century. Pseudo-scientific models of anatomy and craniometry were used to argue that Africans, Asians, Native Americans, and Pacific Islanders were racially inferior to Europeans. The fear of miscegenation that followed responded to the concern that the offspring of racial interbreeding would result in the dilution of the European race. Hybrids were seen as an aberration, worse than the inferior races, a weak and diseased mutation.

Hybridity as a concern for racial purity responds clearly to the zeitgeist of colonialism; despite the backdrop of the humanitarian Age of Enlightenment, social hierarchy was beyond contention as was the position of Europeans at its summit. The social transformations that followed the ending of colonial mandates, rising immigration, and economic liberalization have profoundly altered the use and the understanding of the term.

== In post-colonial discourse ==
Hybrid talk, the rhetoric of hybridity, is fundamentally associated with the emergence of post-colonial discourse and its critiques of cultural imperialism. It is the second stage in the history of hybridity, characterized by literature and theory that study the effects of mixture (hybridity) upon identity and culture. The principal theorists of hybridity are Homi Bhabha, Néstor García Canclini, Stuart Hall, Gayatri Spivak, and Paul Gilroy, whose works respond to the multi-cultural awareness that emerged in the early 1990s.

In the theoretic development of hybridity, the key text is The Location of Culture (1994), by Homi Bhabha, wherein the liminality of hybridity is presented as a paradigm of colonial anxiety. The principal proposition is the hybridity of colonial identity, which, as a cultural form, made the colonial masters ambivalent, and, as such, altered the authority of power. Hybridity demonstrates how cultures come to be represented by processes of iteration and translation through which their meanings are vicariously addressed to—through—an Other. This contrasts any "essentialist claims for the inherent authenticity or purity of cultures which, when inscribed in the naturalistic sign of symbolic consciousness frequently become political arguments for the hierarchy and ascendancy of powerful cultures." This also means that the colonial subject takes place, its subaltern position inscribed in that space of iteration. The colonial subject is located in a place of hybridity, its identity formed in a space of iteration and translation by the colonizer. Bhabha emphasizes that "the discriminatory effects of the discourse of cultural colonialism, for instance, do not simply or singly refer to a 'person'... or to a discrimination between mother culture and alien culture...the reference of discrimination is always to a process of splitting as the condition of subjection: a discrimination between the mother and its bastards, the self and its doubles, where the trace of what is disavowed is not repressed but repeated as something different—a mutation." Like mimicry, hybridity is a metonymy of presence. Hybridity opens up a space, figuratively speaking, where the construction of a political object that is new, neither the colonizer nor the Other, properly defies our political expectations. However, like Bhabha's concept of mimicry, hybridity is a doubling, dissembling image of being in at least two places at once. This turn in the effect of hybridity makes the presence of colonist authority no longer immediately visible.

Bhabha includes interpretations of hybridity in postcolonial discourse. One is that he sees hybridity as a strategic reversal of the process domination through disavowal. Hybridity reevaluates the assumption of colonial identity through the repetition of discriminatory identity effects. In this way, hybridity can unsettle the narcissist demands of colonial power, but reforms its identifications in strategies of subversion that turn the gaze of the discriminated back upon the colonist. Therefore, with this interpretation, hybridity represents that ambivalent ‘turn’ of the subject into the anxiety-causing object of "paranoid classification—a disturbing questioning of the images and presences of authority". The hybrid retains the actual semblance of the authoritative symbol but reforms its presence by denying it as the signifier of disfigurement—after the intervention of difference. In turn, mimicry is the effect of hybridity. First, the metonymy of presence supports the authoritarian voyeurism, but then as discrimination turns into the assertion of the hybrid, the sign of authority becomes a mask, a mockery.

Although the original, theoretic development of hybridity addressed the narratives of cultural imperialism, Bhabha's work also comprehends the cultural politics of the condition of being "a migrant" in the contemporary metropolis. Yet hybridity no longer is solely associated with migrant populations and with border towns, it also applies contextually to the flow of cultures and their interactions.

That critique of cultural imperialist hybridity meant that the rhetoric of hybridity progressed to challenging essentialism, and is applied to sociological theories of identity, multiculturalism, and racism. Moreover, polyphony is another important element of hybridity theory, by Mikhail Bakhtin, which is applied to hybrid discourses presented in folklore and anthropology.

=== Criticism of hybridity theory ===
The development of hybridity theory as a discourse of anti-essentialism marked the height of the popularity of academic "hybridity talk". However the usage of hybridity in theory to eliminate essentialist thinking and practices (namely racism) failed as hybridity itself is prone to the same essentialist framework and thus requires definition and placement. A number of arguments have followed in which promoters and detractors argue the uses of hybridity theory. Much of this debate can be criticized as being excessively bogged down in theory and pertaining to some unhelpful quarrels on the direction hybridity should progress e.g. attached to racial theory, post-colonialism, cultural studies, or globalization. Sociologist Jan Nederveen Pieterse highlights these core arguments in a debate that promotes hybridity.

Some on the left, such as cultural theorist John Hutnyk, have criticized hybridity as politically void. Others like Aijaz Ahmad, Arif Dirlik, and Benita Parry blame Homi Bhabha for recycling obscure psychoanalytic and postmodern theories of culture and identity. Ahmad criticizes Bhabha for establishing a postcolonial theory which overlooks the material colonial context and post-independence realities of the former colonies. He writes: "Between postcoloniality as it exists in a former colony like India, and postcoloniality as the condition of discourse by such critics as Bhabha, there would appear to be a considerable gap". Dirlik follows in a similar vein, stressing the postcolonial theorists’ propensity to flatten out cultural difference under the umbrella term of hybridity: "Africa, Caribbean, South-Asian literatures come from different places and different histories, and not merely different from France, but different from each other. It is this real sort of difference that disappears in postcolonial studies". In "Signs of our Time" Benita Parry discusses The Location of Culture and criticizes the "linguistic turn" in cultural studies, more particularly, Bhabha's dependence on fuzzy psychoanalytical and linguistic explanations of cultural identities, or what she calls the "autarchy of the signifier". In Postcolonial Studies: a materialist critique, she further rails against the "linguistic turn" and recommends a materialist postcolonial critique that addresses colonialism's epistemic violence within the wider context of the economic exploitation of the colonized masses by imperial capitalism.

More recently, Amar Acheraiou in Questioning Hybridity, Postcolonialism and Globalization challenges Bhabha's theory of hybridity on theoretical as well as ideological and historical grounds. He criticizes Bhabha for examining hybridity from a narrow, "synchronic" perspective confined to the 19th century, instead of adopting a "diachronic" view which renders better this concept's historical depth. He also reproaches this theorist for stripping the notion of hybridity off its constitutive racial connotations and considers this as an essentialist gesture. According to him, by clearing this concept of its negative biological associations, Bhabha evades the discussion of the problematic issue of race and racism, which should, paradoxically, be a central concern in hybridity theory. He further argues that Bhabha overlooks the fact that there are still today several places across the world where for many biologically hybrids, hybridity or "the third space" often proves "the space of the impossible" rather than a site of cultural and racial emancipation. The new theory of hybridity that Acheraiou develops in this book departs from the strictly "cultural and spatial paradigm" of postcolonial theory, or what he calls "angelic hybridism." It is a broadly historical and multi-layered form of hybridity focused on the nebulous political, economic, and ideological power structures, emancipatory as well as oppressive, which have presided over the discourse and practice of hybridity since the dawn of civilization. He calls this alternative mode of rethinking postcoloniality "a radical ethics of hybridity," which is "global in scope and planetary in aspiration". Furthermore, he stresses that this "resistive planetary hybridity" is not "confined to the migrant, diasporic condition," and has "as many centres of consciousness as geographical points of origin".

The next phase in the use of the term has been to see hybridity as a cultural effect of globalization. For example, hybridity is presented by Kraidy as the 'cultural logic' of globalization as it "entails that traces of other cultures exist in every culture, thus offering foreign media and marketers transcultural wedges for forging affective links between their commodities and local communities." Another promoter of hybridity as globalization is Jan Nederveen Pieterse, who asserts hybridity as the rhizome of culture. He argues that globalization as hybridization opposes views which see the process as homogenizing, modernizing, and westernizing, and that it broadens the empirical history of the concept. However neither of these scholars have reinvigorated the hybridity theory debate in terms of solving its inherent problematics. The term hybridity remains contested precisely because it has resisted the appropriations of numerous discourses despite the fact that it is radically malleable. For example, young Muslims in Indonesia are followers of Islam but have "synthesized" trends from global culture in ways that respect religious tradition. These include drinking non-alcoholic beer, using Koranic apps on their iPhones, and buying halal cosmetics. In anti-Western countries, youth who try to create cultural hybridity through clothing conflict with the traditional views of modesty in their religion. Conflict occurs across generations when older adults clash with youth over youth attempts to change traditions.

== In linguistics ==
=== Colonialism ===
Languages are all hybrid, in varying degrees. For centuries people borrowed from foreign languages, creating thus hybrid linguistic idioms. They did so for commercial, aesthetic, ideological and technological reasons (to facilitate trade transactions, express philosophical or scientific ideas unavailable in their original idioms, enrich and adapt their languages to new realities, subvert a dominant colonial literary canon by deliberately introducing words from the colonized peoples' idiom). Trade and colonization have been the main vehicles of linguistic hybridization across history. Since the classical conquests, both the colonizers and colonized tapped into each other's languages. The Greeks soaked up many mathematical and astronomical concepts from the Egyptians. The Romans, too, absorbed much of Greek culture and ideas. They also drew abundantly from the "barbarians". In Taktika, Arrian (92–175 AD), a Greek historian and philosopher of the Roman period, drew attention to the Romans' indebtedness to their colonial subjects, arguing that "the Romans have many foreign (Iberian, Celtic) terms for formations, for they used Celtic cavalry". In modern times, the French and British resorted to similar linguistic appropriations throughout their conquests. The French language, for example, contains over 200 Arabic and Berber words, most of which were taken up during France's colonization of Algeria. Similarly, hundreds of Indian words entered the English idiom from the seventeenth to the nineteenth century. According to The Oxford English Dictionary, 900 English words are of Indian origin. Linguistic hybridity was manifest in these colonial contexts, but was acknowledged by neither the colonizers nor the colonized. More still, while these linguistic borrowings had, de facto, rendered colonial languages hybrid and therefore impure, the myth of linguistic purity and superiority, inherited from the ancient Greeks’ "linguistic racialism", held firmly among the European colonizers. The Greek word ‘barbarian,’ which was used to refer to non-Greek languages’ inferiority, backwardness and inarticulacy, was adopted by the French since the 16th century. It was often applied to the Basque, Breton and Occitan languages and to their speakers. Abbé Grégoire recommended wiping out these "crude idioms" and forcing French on the Basques, Bretons and Occitans to "spread enlightened ideas (...), well-being and political tranquillity". According to him, this would "banish superstition" and "simplify the mechanism of the political machine." It would, above all, "mould the citizens into a national whole" In Britain, this Aristotelian view of language was revitalized by authors like Jonathan Swift, Samuel Johnson, and Matthew Arnold, who cast respectively the Irish, Scots and Welsh as "rude" and "backward", attributing these peoples’ intellectual and economic "backwardness" to their "inferior" languages.

=== A dual dynamics ===
Linguistic and cultural hybridity is a "dual dynamics" which operates "passively" as well as "actively". Mikhail Bakhtin distinguished two types of hybridity: "organic" or "unconscious" hybridity and "intentional" hybridity. He defines organic hybridity as an "unintentional, unconscious hybridization" and regards it as "the most important mode in the historical life and evolution of all languages". "Intentional hybridization" consists of juxtaposing deliberately different idioms, discourses, and perspectives within the same semiotic space without merging them. Bakhtin states that the language of the novel is "a system of languages that mutually and ideologically interanimate each other". He adds: "the novelistic hybrid is an artistically organized system for bringing different languages in contact with one another, a system having as its goal the illumination of one language by another, the carving-out of a living image of another language". Further down, yet, he cautions against drawing clear-cut boundaries between these two forms of hybridity, arguing that the "centripetal" forces inherent in "organic hybridity" are also present in "intentional hybridity," in the same way as the "centrifugal" features of "intentional hybridity" may be at play in "organic hybridity."

=== The tree model ===
Linguistic hybridity and the case of mixed languages challenge the tree model in linguistics. For example, "Israeli" (a term for Modern Hebrew) has been argued to be a Semito-European hybrid language that "demonstrates that the reality of linguistic genesis is far more complex than a simple family tree system allows. 'Revived' languages are unlikely to have a single parent."

== In the arts ==
Presently, human beings are immersed in a hybridised environment of reality and augmented reality on a daily basis, considering the proliferation of physical and digital media (i.e. print books vs. e-books, music downloads vs. physical formats). Many people attend performances intending to place a digital recording device between them and the performers, intentionally "layering a digital reality on top of the real world." For artists working with and responding to new technologies, the hybridisation of physical and digital elements has become a reflexive reaction to this strange dichotomy. For example, in Rooms by Sara Ludy computer-generated effects process physical spaces into abstractions, making familiar environments and items such as carpets, doors and windows disorientating, set to the sound of an industrial hum. In effect, the distinction between real and virtual space in art is deconstructed. The conditions and processes known as glocalization play an important role in recent forms of hybridity in the arts, since artists commonly seek to negotiate between local and global forces. Several theoretical models have been developed to explain approaches to hybridity in the arts, a phenomenon that is especially common among artists who either identify as multicultural or see their work as situated between “East” and “West.” Such developments demonstrate ways that the arts can both forecast and respond to changing conditions in society.

== See also ==
- Third Space Theory – Postcolonial sociolinguistic theory
- Third place – Social space other than home or workplace
- Cross-cultural – Term with various meanings
- Intercultural theatre
- Migrant literature
- Post-colonial theory – Study of the cultural legacy of colonialism and imperialism
- Glocalization – Portmanteau of globalization and localism
