= Synekism =

Synekism is a concept in urban studies coined by Edward Soja. It refers to the dynamic formation of the polis state — the union of several small urban settlements under the rule of a "capital" city (or so-called city-state or urban system). Soja's definition of synekism, mentioned in Writing the city spatially, is "the stimulus of urban agglomeration."

== Social science ==
From the social sciences' view, it is also a "nucleated and hierarchically nested process of political governance, economic development, social order, and cultural identity" Soja.

In densely settled urban places, a critical mass provides potential for innovation that is not typically available in rural environments, therefore synekism can be thought of as the geographical relationships that create and give importance to cities.
