= Urban Studies (journal) =

- Discipline: Urban studies, urban planning
- Language: English
- Edited by: Yingling Fan

Publication details
- History: 1964-present
- Publisher: SAGE Publications
- Frequency: Monthly
- Impact factor: 4.663 (2020)

Standard abbreviations
- ISO 4: Urban Stud.

Indexing
- ISSN: 0042-0980 (print); 1360-063X (web)
- LCCN: 64009449
- OCLC no.: 465377165

Links
- Journal homepage; SAGE online access; Urban Studies Online website

Urban Studies is a monthly peer-reviewed academic journal covering the field of urban studies. The editor-in-chief is Yingling Fan, and its managing editors are Jon Bannister and Michele Acuto. It was established in 1964 and is published by SAGE Publications on behalf of Urban Studies Journal Ltd.

The journal is also closely connected with the Urban Studies Foundation, a charity which awards grants to researchers in the wider urban studies field.

== Abstracting and indexing ==
The journal is abstracted and indexed in Scopus and the Social Sciences Citation Index. According to the Journal Citation Reports, its two-year impact factor is 4.663, ranking it 32nd out of 125 journals in the category "Environmental Studies" and 7th out of 43 journals in the category "Urban Studies".
