= Michael Storper =

Economic and urban geographer

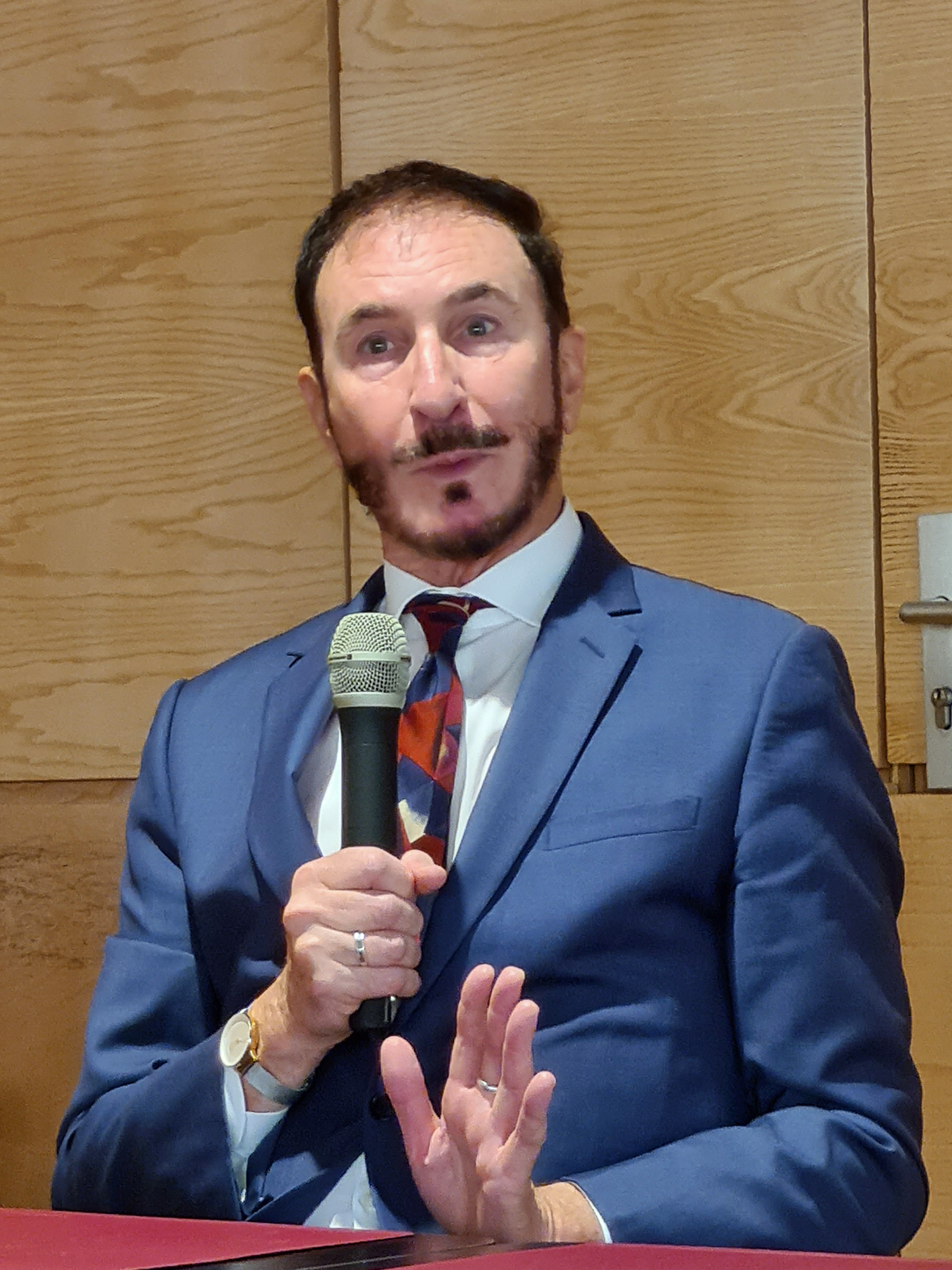

Michael Storper is an economic and urban geographer who teaches at the University of California (UCLA), Sciences Po and London School of Economics.

== Biography ==
Michael Storper completed a bachelor's degree in sociology and history in 1975, followed by a masters in 1979 and a PhD in geography in 1982 from the University of California, Berkeley.

In 2014 he was named by Thomson Reuters as one of the "World’s Most Influential Scientific Minds" of the 21st century for his writings being among the top 1% most cited in the field of social sciences. He is a fellow of the British Academy and in 2016 received the Founder's Medal from the Royal Geographical Society.

He lives between Los Angeles and Paris.

=== Views on housing ===
Storper criticized California Senate Bill 50, which would have eliminated single-family zoning statewide and replaced it with four-plex residential zoning, and enabled dense housing near public transit stations and jobs centers. Storper has argued that slight reductions in stringent zoning would mainly produce housing for wealthy people, and that it is already legal under existing zoning to build millions of units in unprofitable locations.

In a 2020 article published with Andrés Rodríguez-Pose, Storper questioned whether reducing regulatory barriers to housing construction such as restrictive zoning in prosperous urban areas would significantly affect housing supply and prices, and whether it would reduce housing costs for lower-income households in particular. Both the authors of the article and authors writing in response have characterized this position as outside the mainstream consensus of urban economics that strict zoning is the primary cause of the supply shortage and resulting high prices.

== Books ==
- 1989 (with Richard Walker) The Capitalist Imperative: Territory, Technology and Industrial Growth, Wiley-Blackwell
- 1997 The Regional World: Territorial Development in a Global Economy, The Guilford Press
- 2013 Keys to the City: How Economics, Institutions, Social Interaction, and Politics Shape Development, Princeton University Press
- 2015 The Rise and Fall of Urban Economies: Lessons from San Francisco and Los Angeles, Stanford Business Books
