= Allen J. Scott =

British professor of geography (born 1938)

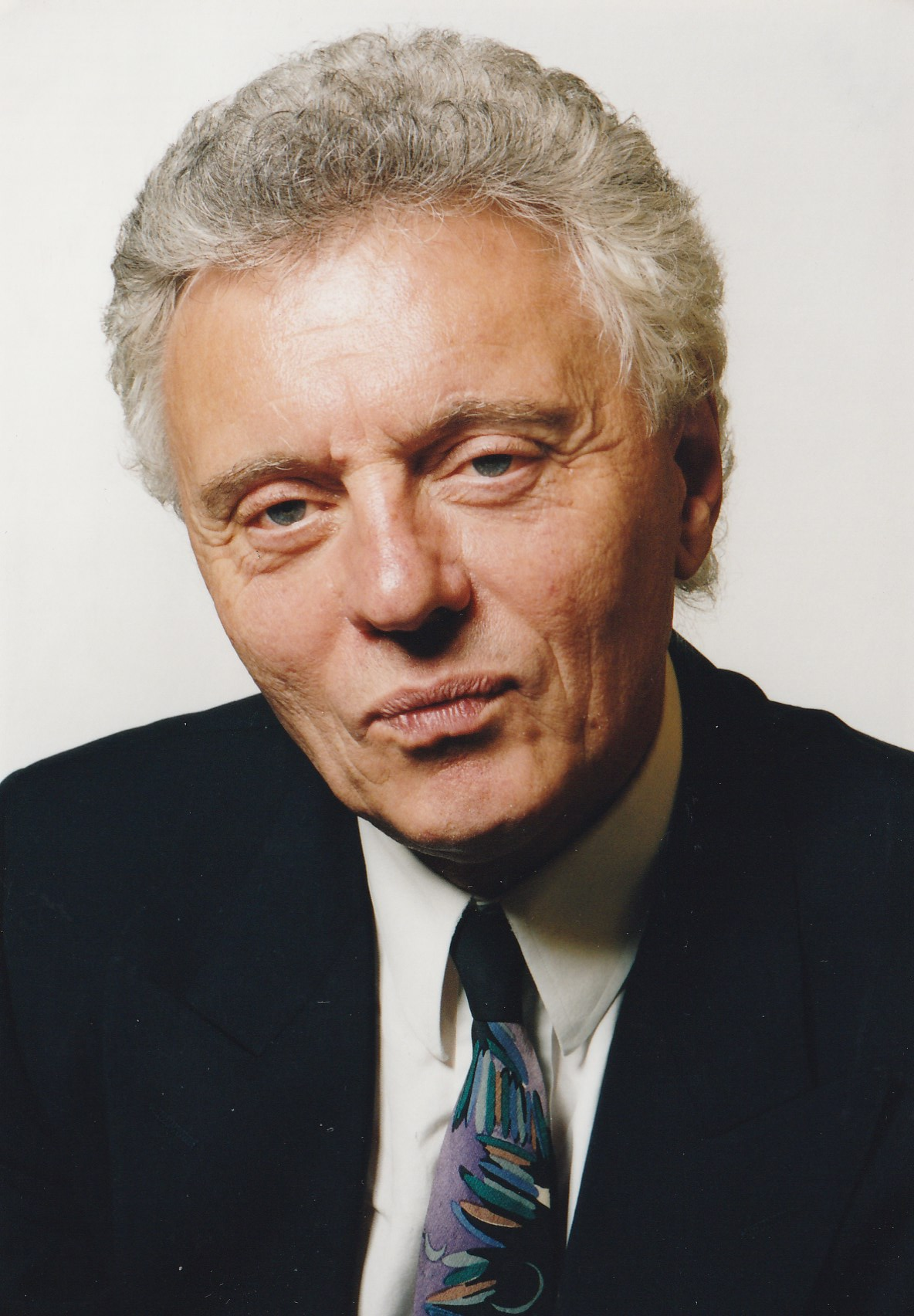
Allen John Scott

Allen John Scott (born 1938) is a professor of geography and public policy at the University of California, Los Angeles.

== Biography ==
Scott was born in Liverpool, England in 1938 and was raised in Carlisle. Scott graduated from St John's College, Oxford University, in 1961. He holds a Ph.D. degree from Northwestern University (1965). He has taught at the University of Pennsylvania, University College London, University of Toronto, University of Paris, University of Hong Kong, and from 1981 at the University of California, Los Angeles, where he was a distinguished professor with joint appointments in the Department of Public Policy and the Department of Geography. Scott became Professor Emeritus in 2013.

== Awards and honors ==
- Professeur associé, elected by the French Comité Consultatif des Universités, 1974 - 1975.
- Croucher Fellow, University of Hong Kong, 1984
- Visiting Exchange Scholar under auspices of Committee on Scholarly Communication with the People's Republic of China, National Academy of Sciences, 1986
- Guggenheim Fellowship, 1986–87
- Awarded honors by the Association of American Geographers, 1987
- Elected fellow of the British Academy, 1999
- André Siegfried Chair, Institut d'Etudes Politiques, Paris, 1999
- Vautrin Lud Prize, 2003
- First Trust Bank Chair of Innovation, Queen's University, Belfast, 2004.
- Chaire d'Excellence Pierre de Fermat, University of Toulouse-Le Mirail, 2005
- Hallsworth Visiting Professorship, School of Environment and Development, University of Manchester, 2006
- Wibaut Chair, University of Amsterdam, 2006
- "On Hollywood: the Place, the Industry" awarded Meridian Book Prize, 2006
- Carol and Bruce Mallen Lifetime Achievement Award for Published Scholarly Contributions to Motion Picture Industry Studies, 2008
- Isaac Manasseh Meyer Fellowship, National University of Singapore, 2009
- Anders Retzius Gold Medal of the Swedish Society for Anthropology and Geography, awarded by King Carl XVI Gustaf of Sweden, 2009.
- Doctor Honoris Causa, Friedrich Schiller University of Jena, 2011
- Academic Icon, University of Malaya, Kuala Lumpur, Malaysia, 2012.
- Prix de l'Association des Economistes de Langues Néolatines, 2013.
- Elected to the Academia Europaea, 2013.
- Sir Peter Hall Prize, awarded by the Regional Studies Association, 2013.
- Doctor of Laws, honoris causa, University of Toronto, 2021.
- Elected Fellow of the Academy of Social Sciences, 2022.
