= List of social science journals =

The following is a partial list of social science journals, including history and area studies. There are thousands of academic journals covering the social sciences in publication, and many more have been published at various points in the past. The list given here is far from exhaustive, and contains the most influential, currently publishing journals in each field. As a rule of thumb, each field should be represented by at most ten positions, chosen by their impact factors and other ratings. There are many important academic magazines that are not true peer-reviewed journals. They are not listed here.

For a list of periodicals in the physical, life, and applied sciences, see List of scientific journals.

== Anthropology ==
- American Anthropologist
- Chungara
- Culture, Theory and Critique
- Cultural Survival
- Current Anthropology
- Evolutionary Anthropology
- Social Evolution & History
- Structure and Dynamics: eJournal of the Anthropological and Related Sciences
- Terrain

== Archaeology ==
- African Archaeological Review
- American Antiquity
- American Journal of Archaeology
- Antiquity
- Arabian Archaeology and Epigraphy
- International Journal of South American Archaeology
- Journal of Archaeological Science
- Journal of Anthropological Archaeology
- Journal of Archaeological Method and Theory
- Latin American Antiquity

== Area studies ==
- Abbia: Cameroon Cultural Review
- American Journal of Chinese Studies
- American Quarterly
- Azure
- Central Asia Monitor
- Central Asian Review
- Central European Journal of International and Security Studies
- Debatte: Journal of Contemporary Central and Eastern Europe
- Harvard Journal of Asiatic Studies
- Forum Italicum
- Iranian Studies
- Journal of the American Research Center in Egypt
- Journal of Asian Studies
- Journal of Japanese Studies
- Journal of Latin American Studies
- Journal of Modern Greek Studies
- Journal of Near Eastern Studies
- Monumenta Nipponica
- Norte Grande Geography Journal
- Pacific Northwest Quarterly
- Palestine-Israel Journal
- Problems of Post-Communism
- Revista Universum
- Sarmatian Review
- SOAS Bulletin of Burma Research

== Business, management & organization theory ==
- Academy of Management Journal
- Academy of Management Review
- Administrative Science Quarterly
- Business and Professional Communication Quarterly
- Business Process Management Journal
- International Marketing Review
- International Small Business Journal
- Journal of Business Strategy
- Journal of Management
- Journal of Media Business Studies
- Management Science
- Measuring Business Excellence
- Organization Development Journal
- Organization Science
- Organization Studies
- Strategic Management Journal

== Communication ==
- Communication Monographs
- Communication Research
- Communication Theory
- Human Communication Research
- Journal of Communication

== Demography ==
- Canadian Studies in Population
- Demography
- International Migration Review
- Journal of Population Economics
- Population and Development Review

== Economics ==
- American Economic Journal: Macroeconomics
- American Economic Review
- Economic Journal
- Journal of Economic Literature
- Journal of Economic Perspectives
- Journal of Financial Economics
- Journal of Political Economy
- Oxford Review of Economic Policy
- Quarterly Journal of Economics

== Education and educational technology ==
- American Educational Research Journal
- American Journal of Education
- College Teaching
- Educational Administration Quarterly
- Educational Researcher
- Educational Technology & Society
- Harvard Educational Review
- Journal of Higher Education
- Research in Learning Technology
- Review of Educational Research
- Studies in Higher Education
- Teachers College Record

== Environmental social science ==
- Ecology and Society
- Environmental Research Letters
- Environmental Values
- Global Environmental Politics
- Journal of Political Ecology
- Nature and Culture
- Nature Food
- Nature Sustainability
- Organization & Environment
- Population and Environment

== Geography ==
- Antipode
- Area
- The Geographical Journal
- Journal of Biogeography
- Journal of Quaternary Science
- Polar Research
- The Professional Geographer
- Transactions of the Institute of British Geographers

== History ==
- American Historical Review
- English Historical Review
- History Compass
- History Workshop Journal
- Journal of American History
- Journal of Global History
- Journal of Modern History
- Journal of Social History
- Journal of the American Research Center in Egypt
- Past & Present
- The Historical Journal

== Interdisciplinary social science ==
- Asian Journal of Social Science
- Behavioral and Social Sciences Librarian
- Information & Media
- Methodology
- Pertanika Journal of Social Sciences & Humanities
- The Social Science Journal
- Surveillance & Society
- Social Science Research

== Law ==
- California Law Review
- Harvard Law Review
- Law & Critique
- Michigan Law Review
- Stanford Law Review
- Yale Law Journal

== Medicine ==
- Social Science & Medicine

== Planning ==
- Environment and Planning
- Journal of Planning Education and Research
- Journal of Planning History
- Journal of Planning Literature
- Planning Theory
- Urban Geography

== Political science ==
- American Journal of Political Science
- American Political Science Review
- Annual Review of Political Science
- Comparative Politics
- Journal of Conflict Resolution
- Journal of Democracy
- Journal of Politics & Society
- Political Geography

== Semiotics ==
- The American Journal of Semiotics
- Semiotica
- Sign Systems Studies

== Social policy ==
- Critical Social Policy
- Global Social Policy
- International Journal of Social Welfare
- Journal of Disability Policy Studies
- Journal of European Social Policy
- Journal of International & Comparative Social Policy
- Journal of Social Policy
- Social Choice and Welfare
- Social Policy & Society

== Social work ==
- Children & Society
- Clinical Social Work Journal
- International Social Work
- Journal of Social Work
- Qualitative Social Work
- Research on Social Work Practice
- Social Service Review
- Social Work in Public Health

== Sociology ==
- American Journal of Sociology
- American Sociological Review
- Annual Review of Sociology
- British Journal of Sociology
- Corvinus Journal of Sociology and Social Policy
- Social Forces

== Tourism ==
- International Journal of Tourism Sciences

== Women's studies ==
- Asian Women
- Gender & Society
- Journal of Women's Health
- Psychology of Women Quarterly
- Sex Roles
- Women & Health
- Women's Health Issues

== See also ==
- List of open-access journals
- List of academic databases and search engines
- Wikibook Textbook
