= Ghislain Deslandes =

French philosopher

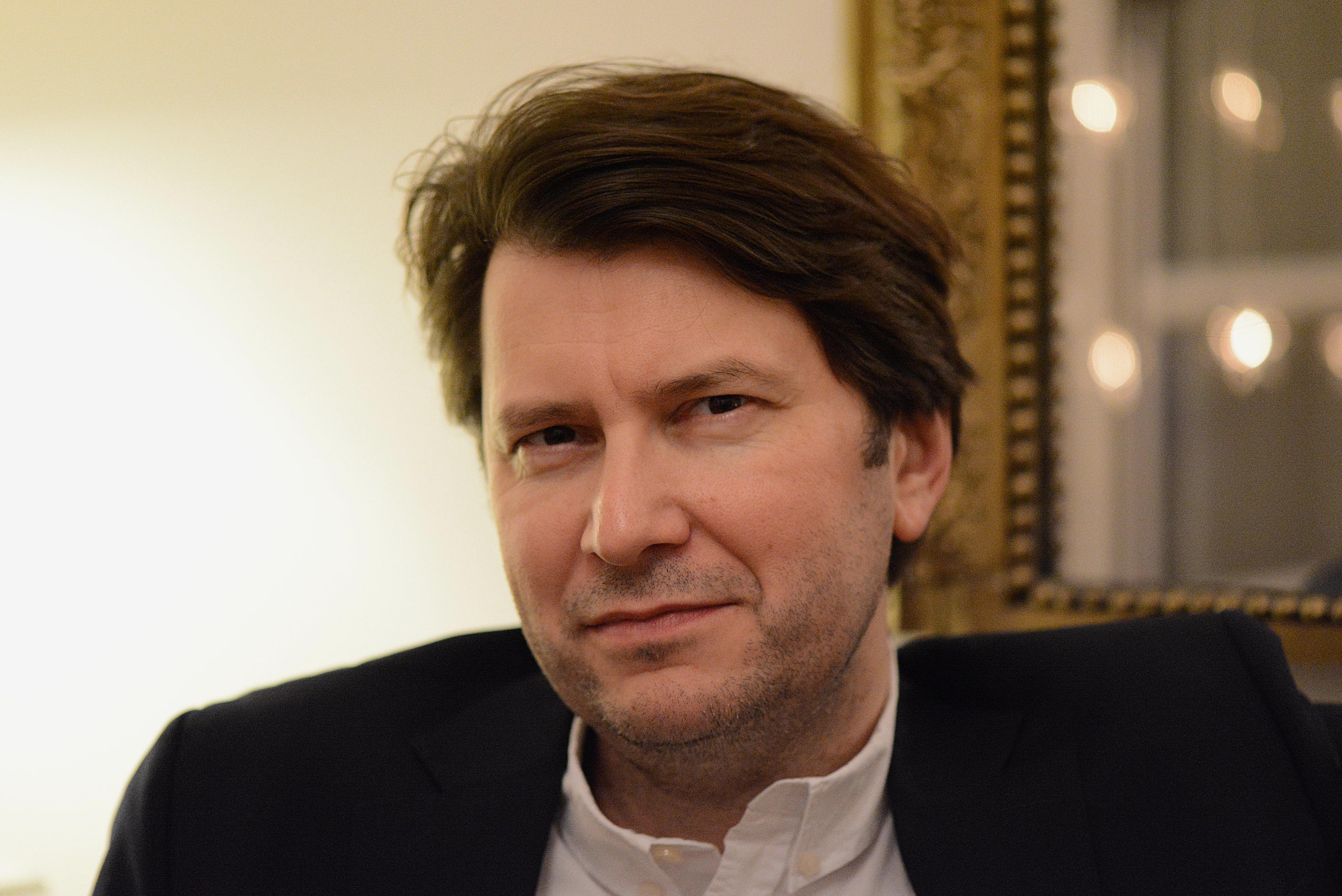

Philosophical work
- Institutions: Université Paris 1 Panthéon-Sorbonne, Université Paris-Dauphine, Northwestern University, Harvard University
- Main interests: Continental philosophy, Leadership studies, Media management, Postmodern theology
- Notable works: Antiphilosophy of Christianity, The Idea of Beginning in Jules Lequier's Philosophy
- Notable ideas: Business aesth/ethics, Beau geste, Desaffectio societatis, Informal benevolence, Organosophy, Phantom-becoming of organisations, Postcritical hermeneutics, Weak management

Ghislain Deslandes is a philosopher born in Angers (France) on the 16th of August 1970.

His interdisciplinary discourse spans such topics as management science, leadership studies and postmodern theology.

At ESCP Business School, he is full professor and a member of the Law, Economics and Humanities department and he is best known as the academic director of the Media programme since 1997, a pioneer in Europe in the fields of media economics and media management.

He received the EFMD-FNEGE Best Essay award in 2015 and the 1st ESCP Research award in 2019.

He is also a former program director at the Collège International de Philosophie (CIPh) and a full member of the Société Française de Philosophie.

== Research work ==
His inaugural research focuses on the philosophical affinities between Blaise Pascal and Søren Kierkegaard, highlighting a sense of unity presented as an Antiphilosophy of Christianity. His work also explores issues in business ethics, communication studies, gender studies or stakeholder theory by contrasting the ideas of these two authors with those of others in the Western philosophical tradition. His approach to organisational phenomena allows him to revisit the field of management science by formulating the contours of a postcritical hermeneutics that both reduces the overemphasis on the objective dimension of work and brings its affective dimension back at the center of attention.

=== Media management ===
His research has contributed to the consolidation of a European orientation, especially through his involvement in the activities of EMMA, to media organization studies. His initial work presents media management less as a new academic discipline than as a multi-paradigm field of research that challenges the universalist approaches to management science. Hence his special interest for the place of ethics, CSR and organizational identity in managing media companies and entertainment businesses.

=== Philosophy of management ===
Drawing on various sources of continental philosophy his work highlights the fact that ethics in business cannot be taught or understood as any other management "knowledge". In the Ancient Greece, the "oikonomos" was not only dedicated to take advantage of existing assets but also to master his/her self and to care for the society as a whole.

At the Collège international de philosophie, he developed a research program which aimed to extend the efforts made by researchers in order to discuss the commonly held epistemic and political aspects of modern management. The program emphasized "the crisis of the foundations faced by management science in its ethical/philosophical aims", a crisis that can be defined as desaffectio societatis, and which seems to concern managers more and more.

=== Leadership studies ===
From an interpretation of Blaise Pascal and Paul Ricoeur’s analysis of power, he suggests new concepts to discuss the question of leadership responsibility, rethinking the usual way of considering it : practical wisdom, negative humanism or "double thought". It leads him to show that power cannot be separated from a dialectic of abilities and disabilities; this approach is at the root of several contributions about the strategic "vision" and gender issues using the works of Henri Bergson and Gilles Deleuze, and about the beau geste as a critical behavior in organizations.

=== Continental philosophy of religion ===
In this field, he applies the notion of antiphilosophy as defined by Alain Badiou to a comparative philosophical analysis of Kierkegaard and Pascal. He examines the unique position occupied by these two authors in light of their idiosyncratic understanding of the relationship between faith and philosophical doubt. He also explores the connections between this position and more recent currents of thought, with particular reference to John Caputo, Gianni Vattimo and Michel Henry. This perspective is also largely discussed in his essay focusing on the idea of "beginning" in Lequier's philosophy.

== Bibliography ==
=== Books ===
- Business Aesth/ethics : Dialogical Perspectives, Springer, 2026., with Jean-Philippe Bouilloud.
- Humanities and Organizations in Dialogue : Hermeneutic Inquiries, Rowman & Littlefield, 2024.
- Postcritical Management Studies : Philosophical Investigations, Springer, 2023.
- The Idea of Beginning in Jules Lequier's Philosophy, Rowman & Littlefield, 2023.
- Antiphilosophy of Christianity, Springer, 2021.

=== Academic publications (selection) ===
- The Repainted Leader or the Ethics of Portraiture, Business Ethics Quarterly, with E. Riot, 2025.
- Corporate Mythology and the Phantom-Becoming of Organisations, European Management Journal, with T. Simon, 2025.
- Digitalisation and the Need for a "Humanistic" Turn in Media Management, Journal of Media Business Studies, with S. Gourevitch, 2024.
- Strategy and its Demons (Media review), Organization Studies (journal) 2024.
- Branching-off in the Anthropocene era, Organization Studies (journal), 2021.
- Understanding the Human in Stakeholder Theory: a Phenomenological Approach to Affect-based Theory, Management Learning, with M. Painter and M. Perezts, 2020.
- Formal and Informal Benevolence in a Profit-Oriented Context, Journal of Business Ethics, with G. Mercier, 2019.
- European Management Teaching and Research: Reflections on the Life and Work of A. Blanqui, European Management Journal, 2019.
- Escape from freedom: Revisiting Erich Fromm in the light of Contemporary Authoritarianism (book review), Organization Studies (journal), 2018.
- Talent Management: The Good, the Bad, and the Possible, European Management Review, with M. Painter-Morland, S. Kirk and C. Tansley, 2018.
- Weak Theology and Organization Studies, Organization Studies (journal), 2018.
- Authentic Leading as Relational Accountability: Facing up to the Conflicting Expectations of Media Leaders, Leadership (journal), with M. Painter-Morland, 2017.
- The Leader as Chief Truth Officer, Journal of Business Ethics, with J. P. Bouilloud and G. Mercier, 2017.
- Reconceptualizing CSR in the Media Industry as Relational Accountability, Journal of Business Ethics, with M. Painter-Morland, 2016.
- There are no Codes, Only Interpretations. Practical Wisdom and Hermeneutics in Monastic Organizations, Journal of Business Ethics, with G. Mercier, 2016.
- The dynamics of Organizational Identity from a Ricoeurian Perspective, Journal for Communication and Culture, 2015.
- The Aesthetics of Leadership: Beau Geste as Critical Behaviour, Organization Studies (journal), with J. P. Bouilloud, 2015.
- Gender and Visionary Leading: rethinking "Vision" with Bergson, Deleuze and Guattari, Organization, with M. Painter-Morland, 2014.
- Power, Profits, and Practical Wisdom: Perspectives on the Possibility of an Ethics in Institutions, Business and Professional Ethics Journal, 2012.
- The Care-of-Self Ethic with Continual Reference to Socrates: Towards Ethical Self-Management, Business Ethics: A European Review, 2012.
- Turkish auteur cinema and European identity: Economic influences on aesthetic issues, Journal of European Popular Culture, with J. Maixent, 2012.
- Corporate Culture versus Organizational Identity: Implications for Media Management, Journal of Media Business Studies, 2011.
- In Search of Individual Responsibility: The Dark Side of Organizations in the Light of Jansenist Ethics, Journal of Business Ethics, 2011.
- Indirect Communication and Business Ethics: Kierkegaardian Perspectives, Business and Professional Ethics Journal, 2011.
