= Sven Pagel =

German professor of business informatics and media management

- Born: 25 June 1973 (age 53); Bonn, Germany
- Education: University of Giessen; Heriot-Watt University; University of Montpellier
- Scientific career
- Fields: Business informatics; Media management; Media economics
- Workplaces: ZDF; Südwestrundfunk; Hochschule Düsseldorf; University of Applied Sciences, Mainz
- Doctoral advisor: Jürgen Heinrich

Sven Pagel (born 25 June 1973 in Bonn) is a German professor of business informatics and media management. His research focuses on digital moving image communication in Internet media, UX and user research, and digital transformation. Since 2013 Pagel has been teaching at the University of Applied Sciences in Mainz.

== Life ==
After graduating from the Hardtberg-Gymnasium in Bonn in 1992, Pagel began studying business administration at the Justus Liebig University Giessen, majoring in business informatics, controlling, and international companies, and graduating in 1998. In parallel, he studied business organization at Heriot-Watt University Edinburgh from 1994 to 1995 and at the University of Montpellier from 1996 to 1997. After completing his studies, Pagel was a lecturer in the IT division of the business administration department at ZDF in Mainz from 1998. After 2 years he became a freelancer for the digital services at ZDFvision and moved to Südwestrundfunk in Mainz in 2002 as a consultant for online coordination. He also worked as a freelancer in service multimedia at ARTE in Strasbourg.

From 2000 to 2003 Pagel completed his doctorate at the Institute of Journalism at the University of Dortmund under Jürgen Heinrich. In 2004, Pagel became a professor of business administration, in particular communication and multimedia, at the University of Applied Sciences Düsseldorf. Since 2013, he has been a professor of business informatics and media management at the University of Applied Sciences Mainz.

== Awards ==
- 2000: Karl-Holzamer scholarship of the ZDF, Mainz
- 2000: Doctoral scholarship of the Foundation of the German Economy, Berlin
- 1998: University Promotion Prize of the University of Giessen
- 1995: Scholarship of the Friedrich Naumann Foundation, Potsdam

== Bibliography ==
- Pagel, Sven; Gerhards, Claudia (2009). Internetfernsehen von TV-Sendern & User Generated Content [Internet television from TV stations & user generated content] (PDF) (in German). Berlin: Friedrich-Ebert-Stiftung. ISBN 978-3-86872-033-4.
- Pagel, Sven (2003). Integriertes Content-Management in Fernsehunternehmen [Integrated content management in television companies] (in German). Wiesbaden: [Springer Fachmedien. ISBN 978-3-8244-0682-1.
