= Urban social geography =

Urban social geography is a sub-field within human geography, looking at the factors within an urban environment that affect human relationships on social, economic and political levels. Those human relationships then feed back into the factors which then shape dynamics of the actual city itself. With numerous inputs and outputs, this study is a constantly evolving field.

Cities are more than just a dot on the map or a set of buildings. Alcaeus, a Greek poet, wrote about cities "not the house finely roofed or the stones of walls well builded, nay, nor canals, and dockyards make the city, but men able to use their opportunity". Cities have also been described as prisms in which one can see the social, economic, and geographical characteristics from which they evolved. Urban centers not only have a disproportionate percentage of the population, but also have a large amount of fixed assets, capital, labor resources, and productive capacity.

== Areas ==
Social dynamics
The confines of a city often force various social and ethnic groups to live within close proximity of one another. Societies are defined as a collective sense of individuals and the relationships they form. Within societies, individuals help to distinguish from one another based on social identities. Often, these social identity differences can result in conflict or in a group attempting to separate from the rest of society. London is one of the most diverse cities in the world, where a single street can have restaurants from more than 30 countries, from a vast range of cultures. In such a dense distribution, conflict may arise. Another prime example of this is Kurdistan. Though the Kurds do not officially have a country of their own, they govern themselves and see themselves as very different from the Turks and Iraqis that surround them.
Economics
In the age of the Industrial Revolution, many populations shifted from rural, agrarian based into the urban areas. Later in the twentieth century, as manufacturing started to leave urban areas, such as happened in Detroit, this acted as a force of change within urban households. Prior to, a single paycheck could often support a household. After manufacturing shifts, a household often had to shift to a dual-income where both parents have to work to support the family. As an example of the effect this creates, there is then a greater demand for child care in that urban area. While some families will stick in the area and change their lifestyles to acclimate, some will choose to leave for greener pastures. As families start to leave urban areas, neighborhoods will either become abandoned or to slowly wither in terms of economic status. This changing of the economy often results in a rise in crime and in deterioration of the physical neighborhoods. As those property values decline, eventually this leads to gentrification where individuals from outside the urban area will move in and fix up the neighborhood. This process will then force property values up and possibly force longstanding residents to move on.
Conflict
In the relative close confines of a city, differences resulting from political, social, and economic differences can result in conflict amongst competing groups. Conflicts in urban areas are intensified because they are often such an extreme intersection of conflicting ideologies. With the close confines of urban areas, conflicts here often result in the greatest number of fatalities and amounts of property destruction, population displacement, and as a result stress on emergency infrastructure. Prime examples of these conflicts have been seen recently in South Africa, Liberia, Sudan and Burundi.
Social media
In the advent of the social media age, there has been a tremendous effect on the way which people interact with one another and the choices they make in their daily lives. Traditions depend on culture, however very often individuals will enter into relationships with those who may be within their neighborhood or those whom cross their paths during their daily routine. The advent of social media has changed that dynamic. No longer are individuals limited to relationships with those in their immediate surroundings. Very often, now, individuals are meeting across long distances via social media. When a relationship progresses, these individuals can choose to live with one another. Thus a person from a different culture, and how has different experiences is injected into a new urban environment. Thus feeding into the changing dynamics of the area. Social media is also used as a means to study the activity patterns of urban dwellers. The immense amount of geo-location available, from social media applications, has opened up a whole new method of study. People's geolocation data is helping to feed the study of the activity choices, and to offer insight into how groups of certain types choose particular neighborhoods that fit their interests. Behavioral analysis has opened up ways to hook into lifestyle patterns and their interconnections within transportation science, travel patterns, workplace location choice, restaurant choice, retail establishment type, vehicle ownership, and income levels.

== Key individuals ==
Significant figures in the study of urban social geography include Manuel Castells, David Harvey, Doreen Massey and Nigel Thrift.
