= Mike Crang =

Michael A. Crang is the Head of Department in the Department of Geography at Durham University. He is a Professor in cultural geography, with his main research areas relating to the relationship between social memory and identity, theories on space and human perception of space as well as critical theories.

He graduated from the University of Cambridge in 1991 with a first-class degree in the Geographical Tripos and gained a PhD from the University of Bristol. He began working at the University of Durham as a Lecturer in 1994, becoming a Professor in 2011.

Crang is the co-editor of two academic journals: Tourist Studies and Time & Society. He has also published several books on the topics of cultural geography, most notably Thinking Space, which he co-wrote with Nigel Thrift (2000) and Cultural Geography (1998). Crang is also the current chair of the Royal Geographical Society's social and cultural research group. He was a senior editor of the International Encyclopedia of Human Geography and co-editor of the Sage Encyclopaedia of Urban Studies.

As of October 2020, he has 81 publications. Among his most cited include Picturing practices: research through the tourist gaze in Progress in Human Geography (1997).
