= Reinhard Bachmann =

German born social scientist

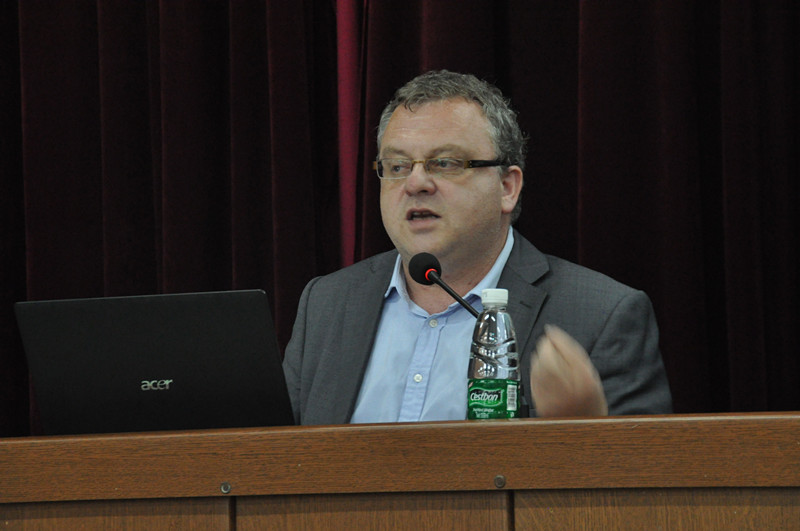
- Born: February 15, 1961 (age 65)

Academic work
- Institutions: SOAS, University of London; University of Surrey; Birkbeck, University of London; University of Groningen; University of Cambridge

Reinhard Bachmann (born, 15 February 1961) is a German-born social scientist who teaches and researches at SOAS, University of London. He is Professor of International Management; and the Founder and Director of the Centre for Trust Research at SOAS. He has served as Head of the School of Finance and Management and is a member of the Senate of SOAS. His work focuses on Strategic Management and Organizational Analysis; it includes major contributions to the field of trust research.

== Career ==
Before moving into his current position at SOAS, Reinhard Bachmann was engaged in research and taught at the University of Cambridge (Research Fellow), University of Groningen (Assistant Professor), University of London, Birkbeck College (as Associate Professor/Reader) and University of Surrey (Professor).

In 2006, he accepted guest professorships to New York University and to the Institute for Advanced Studies in Vienna; and in 2012, he taught as a guest professor at the University of Wuhan. In 2019, he received an invitation from the Free University of Amsterdam; and in 2024 he visited the Muroran Institute of Technology in Japan.

Apart from his academic career, he is frequently giving interviews to specialised practitioners magazines and the general press (e.g., Psychology Today, Die Welt Online, China Daily etc.).

Bachmann also offers consultancy services to public agencies and private businesses. In particular, he is an experienced expert in the field of higher education quality assurance and has worked with various university accreditation agencies.

== Research ==
Bachmann is one of the pioneers of trust research in the field of management theory. Since the 1990s, he has contributed significantly to the development and design of trust research and is one of the most-cited trust scholar in Europe.

He is a member of the editorial boards of the Journal of Inter-organizational Relationships, Organization Studies, Sustainability and the review board of the Journal of Trust Research.

== Selected works ==
Bachmann's works appear in numerous international journals (these include, Organization Studies, Cambridge Journal of Economics, British Journal of Sociology, Journal of Managerial Psychology, European Societies). He has also edited publications, which include the 'Handbook of Trust Research' (Edward Elgar, 2006, with Akbar Zaheer), Landmark Papers on Trust (Edward Elgar, 2008, with Akbar Zaheer), and a collective volume on 'Trust Within and Between Organizations' (Oxford University Press, 2000, with Christel Lane).

Selected articles include:

- The Social Constitution of Trust: Supplier Relations in Britain and Germany. In: Organization Studies 17 (1996), 3. pp. 365–395 (with Christel Lane). – [reprinted in: Masaaki Kotabe and Michael Mol (eds.), Global Supply Chain Management. Volume 2. Cheltenham: Edward Elgar 2006. pp. 161–191, and in: Reinhard Bachmann and Akbar Zaheer (eds.), Landmark Papers on Trust. Volume 1. Cheltenham: Edward Elgar 2008. pp. 331–361].
- Contract Law, Social Norms and Inter-firm Cooperation. In: Cambridge Journal of Economics 21 (1997), 2. pp. 171–195 (with Alessandro Arrighetti and Simon Deakin). - [reprinted in: Reinhard Bachmann and Akbar Zaheer (eds.), Landmark Papers on Trust. Volume 1. Cheltenham: Edward Elgar 2008. pp. 416–440].
- Co-operation in Inter-firm Relations in Britain and Germany: the Role of Social Institutions. In: British Journal of Sociology 48 (1997), 2. pp. 226–254 (with Christel Lane).
- Vertrauen und Macht in zwischenbetrieblichen Kooperationen – zur Rolle von Wirtschaftsrecht und Wirtschaftsverbänden in Deutschland und Großbritannien. In: Managementforschung 7 (edited by Georg Schreyögg/Jörg Sydow) (1997), pp. 79–110 (with Christel Lane). - [reprinted in: Jörg Sydow (ed.), Management von Netzwerkorganisationen. Beiträge aus der 'Managementforschung' (1st-5th editions). Wiesbaden: Gabler 2010. pp. 75–106].
- Co-operation at Work: a Process-Oriented Perspective on Joint Activity in Inter-Organizational Relations. In: Ergonomics 43 (2000), 7. pp. 983–997 (with Theo Wehner and Christoph Clases).
- Trust, Power and Control in Trans-Organizational Relations. In: Organization Studies 22 (2001), 2. pp. 341–369. - [reprinted in: Roderick Kramer (ed.), Organizational Trust. A Reader. Oxford: Oxford University Press 2006. pp. 134–162, and in: Reinhard Bachmann and Akbar Zaheer (eds.), Landmark Papers on Trust. Volume 1. Cheltenham: Edward Elgar 2008. pp. 528–556, and in: Stewart Clegg and Mark Haugaard (eds.), Power and Organizations. London: Sage 2012].
- Studying Trust in Virtual Organizations. In: International Studies of Management and Organization 33 (2003), 3. pp. 7–27 (with Christoph Clases and Theo Wehner).
- Understanding Organizational Trust – Foundations, Constellations, and Issues of Operationalisation. In: Journal of Managerial Psychology 19 (2004), 6. pp. 556–570 (with Guido Möllering and Soo Hee Lee).
- Transition Economies and Trust Building. A Network Perspective on the Enlargement of the E.U. In: Cambridge Journal of Economics 30 (2006), 6. pp. 923–939 (with Hans van Ees).
- Analyzing Inter-organizational Relationships in the Context of their National Business Systems. A Conceptual Framework for Comparative Research. In: European Societies 11 (2009), 1. pp. 49–76 (with Arjen van Witteloostuijn).
- Understanding Institutional-based Trust Building Processes in Inter-organizational Relationships. In: Organization Studies 32 (2011), 2. pp. 281–301 (with Andrew Inkpen). -- [reprinted in: Ana Costa and Neil Anderson (ed.), Trust and Social Capital in Organizations. 4 Vols. London: Sage 2013].
- At the Crossroads: Future Directions in Trust Research. In: Journal of Trust Research 1 (2011), 2. pp. 203–213.
- Why the Epistemologies of Trust Researchers Matter. In: Journal of Trust Research 5 (2015), 2. pp. 153–169 (with Neve Isaeva, Alexandra Bristow and Mark Saunders).
- Repairing Trust in Organizations and Institutions. Toward a Conceptual Framework. In: Organization Studies 36 (2015), 9. pp. 1123–1142 (with Nicole Gillespie and Richard Priem).
- Trust, Power or Money: What Governs Business Relationships? in: International Sociology 32 (2017), 1. pp. 3–20 (with Frens Kroeger).
- Neither Acquiescence nor Defiance: Tuscan Wineries' 'Flexible Reactivity' to the Italian Government's Quality Regulation System. In: British Journal of Sociology 72 (2021), 5. pp. 1430–1447 (with Taeyoung Yoo and Oliver Schilke).
- Responsible Autonomy: The Interplay of Autonomy, Control and Trust for Knowledge Professionals Working Remotely During COVID-19. In: Economic and Industrial Democracy 45 (2024), 1. pp. 57–82 (with Neve Abgeller, Tony Dobbins and Deidre Anderson).
- Identifying Trust Exchange Dynamics and Constituents of Employee Trust within Management Consulting. In: Work, Employment and Society (online first June 2024) (with Neve Abgeller, Mark Saunders and Mishra Aneil).
- Patterns of Trust in Financial Services: Critical Factors and Gender Differences. In: Journal of Financial Services Marketing 30 (2025), 2(with Maryam Sholevar).
- Unpacking the Paradoxes of Trust in Uncertain Times. In: Organization Studies 47 (2026), 3. pp. 359–392 (with Oliver Schilke, Kirsimarja Blomqvist, Rekha Krishnan and Joerg Sydow).
- The Antecedents, Consequences and Repair Mechanisms of Public Trust: A Systematic Literature Review. In: International Journal of Management Reviews 28 (2026), 4. pp. 1-17 (with Agni Shanti Mayangsari, Badri Munir Sukoco and Elisabeth Supriharyanti).
