= List of tourism journals =

This is a list of tourism journals: peer-reviewed academic journals covering the study of all aspects of tourism.

- International Journal of Tourism Sciences
- Journal of Hospitality & Tourism Research
- Journal of Interpretation Research
- Journal of Sustainable Tourism
- Journal of Travel Research
- Journal of Vacation Marketing
- Tourism and Hospitality Research
- Tourist Studies
