= Tourism geography =

Study of travel and tourism

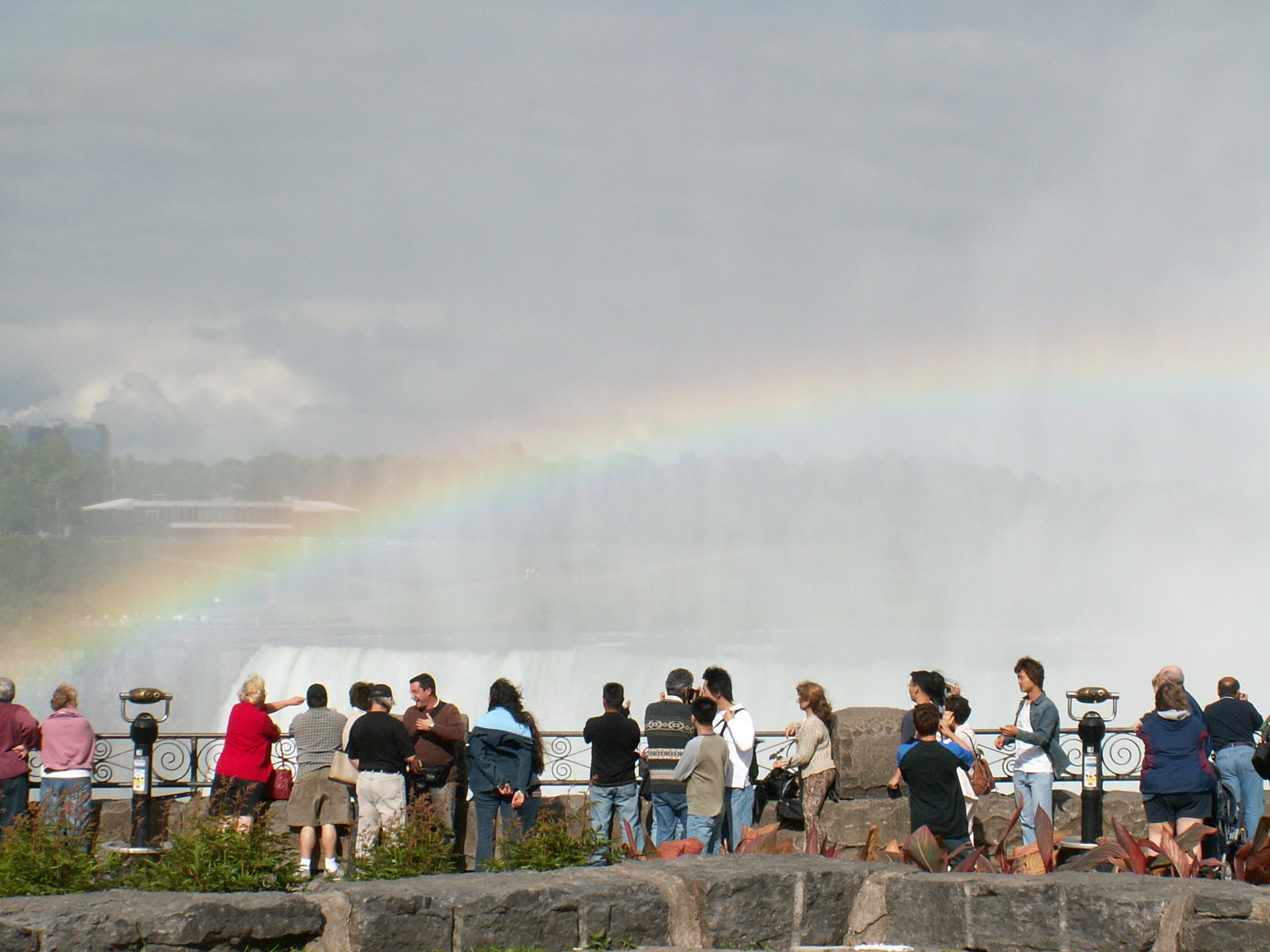
Tourists at Niagara Falls.

Tourism geography is the study of travel and tourism, as an industry and as a social and cultural activity. Tourism geography covers a wide range of interests including the environmental impact of tourism, the geographies of tourism and leisure economies, answering tourism industry and management concerns and the sociology of tourism and locations of tourism.

Tourism geography is that branch of human geography that deals with the study of travel and its impact on places.

Geography is fundamental to the study of tourism, because tourism is geographical in nature. Tourism occurs in places, it involves movement and activities between places and it is an activity in which both place characteristics and personal self-identities are formed, through the relationships that are created among places, landscapes and people. Physical geography provides the essential background, against which tourism places are created and environmental impacts and concerns are major issues, that must be considered in managing the development of tourism places.

The approaches to study will differ according to the varying concerns. Much tourism management literature remains quantitative in methodology and considers tourism as consisting of the places of tourist origin (or tourist generating areas), tourist destinations (or places of tourism supply) and the relationship (connections) between origin and destination places, which includes transportation routes, business relationships and traveler motivations. Recent developments in human geography have resulted in approaches such as those from cultural geography, which take more theoretically diverse approaches to tourism, including a sociology of tourism, which extends beyond tourism as an isolated, exceptional activity and considering how travel fits into the everyday lives and how tourism is not only a consumptive of places, but also produces the sense of place at a destination. The Tourist by Dean MacCannell and The Tourist Gaze by John Urry are classics in this field.

== See also ==
- Tourist motivation
- Cultural tourism
- Ecotourism
- Geotourism
- Heritage tourism
- Hospitality management studies
- Leisure studies
- List of tourism journals
- Sociology of leisure
- Tourism region
