= The Social Science Journal =

- Discipline: Social science
- Language: English
- Edited by: Stephanie Witt

Publication details
- Former name: The Rocky Mountain Social Science Journal
- History: 1963-present
- Publisher: Taylor & Francis on behalf of the Western Social Science Association
- Frequency: Quarterly
- Impact factor: 2.1 (2024)

Standard abbreviations
- ISO 4: Soc. Sci. J.

Indexing
- ISSN: 0362-3319 (print); 1873-5355 (web)
- OCLC no.: 703920163

Links
- Journal homepage; Online access

The Social Science Journal is a quarterly peer-reviewed academic journal covering social science. It was established in 1963 as The Rocky Mountain Social Science Journal, obtaining its current name in 1976. The journal is published by Taylor & Francis on behalf of the Western Social Science Association, of which it is the official journal. The editor-in-chief are Mandi Bates Bailey, Gladys Mitchell-Walthour, and Anne Price.

== Abstracting and indexing ==
According to the Journal Citation Reports, the journal has a 2024 impact factor of 2.1.

== See also ==
- List of social science journals
