= World Media Economics and Management Conference =

The World Media Economics and Management Conference (World Media Economics Conference until 2006) is the biennial meeting of the global community of media business scholars. The academic conference brings scholars worldwide together to reflect on contemporary issues in the economics and management of media industries and firms and is sponsored by The Journal of Media Economics to help improve knowledge and scholarship. The conference was established in 1994 by Robert G. Picard who acted as conference chair until 2018.

The conference moves to a different location every two years. Previous meetings have been held in New York (United States), Rio de Janeiro (Brazil), Thessaloniki (Greece), Bogota (Colombia), Lisbon (Portugal), Beijing (China), Montréal (Canada), London (UK), Turku (Finland), Pamplona (Spain), Zurich (Switzerland), and Stockholm (Sweden).

The 2018 conference was held in Cape Town, South Africa organized by Rhodes University. The next conference 2020 will be held in Rome, Italy by Luiss Business School.

Since 2018 the chair is Gregory F. Lowe (Northwestern University in Qatar) and vice chair is Sylvia Chan-Olmstedt (University of Florida).
