= Abbia =

Abbia may refer to:

- Abbia: Cameroon Cultural Review, a journal
- Abbia (game), an African game of chance
- Old German name for Abja (now part of Abja-Paluoja, Estonia)
