= Rob Kitchin =

British geographer and academic

Robert Michael Kitchin MRIA is an Irish and British geographer and academic. In 2005 he was appointed professor of human geography at Maynooth University (formerly the National University of Ireland Maynooth.

== Education ==
In 1995 was awarded a PhD by the University of Wales, Swansea. His thesis was on Issues of validity and integrity in cognitive mapping research: investigating configurational knowledge.

== Career ==
From 1995 to 1996, Kitchin was a lecturer at Swansea, and was then a lecturer at Queen's University Belfast (1996 to 1998). In 1998, he was appointed to the National University of Ireland, Maynooth. He became Professor of Human Geography in 2005.

Between 2002 and 2013, he was also director of NUI Maynooth's National Institute of Regional and Spatial Analysis. He was Co-Editor-in-Chief of the International Encyclopedia of Human Geography.

== Contributions ==
Kitchin is known for his expertise in the fields of digital technologies, smart cities, data management and governance, geographical aspects of disability, urban and social geography.

== Honours ==
In 2013, Kitchin received the Royal Irish Academy's Gold Medal. In 2015, he was elected a Member of the Royal Irish Academy.

== Publications ==
- Kitchin, R. (1998). Cyberspace: The World in the Wires. Wiley.
- Kitchin, R. & Tate N. (1999).Conducting Research in Human Geography: Theory, Methodology and Practice. Prentice Hall.
- Kitchin, R. (2000.). Disability, Space and Society. Changing Geography Series. Geographical Association.
- (Co-authored with Martin Dodge) Mapping Cyberspace (Routledge, 2000).
- (Co-authored with Mark Blades) The Cognition of Geographic Space (I.B. Tauris, 2001).
- (Co-authored with Martin Dodge) Atlas of Cyberspace. (Addison-Wesley, 2001).
- (Co-authored with Phil Hubbard, Brendan Bartley and Duncan Fuller) Thinking Geographically: Space, Theory and Contemporary Human Geography (Continuum, 2002).
- (Co-authored with Duncan Fuller) The Academic’s Guide to Publishing (Sage, 2005).
- Kitchin, R. & Thrift, N. (Co)Editor-in-Chief) 2005-, International Encyclopaedia of Human Geography Elsevier, 12 volumes
- (Co-authored with Justin Gleeson, Brendan Bartley, John Driscoll, Ronan Foley, Stewart Fotheringham and Chris Lloyd) The Atlas of the Island of Ireland (AIRO/ICLRD, 2008).
- Dodge, M., Kitchin, R. & Perkins, C. (Eds) (2009) Rethinking Maps: New Frontiers in Cartographic Theory. Routledge.
- Kitchin, R. & Dodge, M. (2011). Code/Space: Software and Everyday Life. MIT Press.
- Dodge, M., Kitchin, R. & Perkins, C. (Eds) (2011). The Map Reader: Theories of Mapping Practice and Cartographic Representation. Wiley-Blackwell.
- Lee, R., Castree, N., Kitchin, R., Lawson, V., Paasi, A., Philo, C., Radcliffe, S., Roberts, S. and Withers, C. (Eds) (2014). SAGE Handbook of Human Geography. Sage. 2 volumes
- Castree, N., Kitchin, R. & Rogers, A. (2013). Oxford Dictionary of Human Geography. Oxford University Press.
- Kitchin, R. & Perng, S-Y. (2016) Code and the City. Routledge.
- Kitchin, R., Lauriault, T.P. & Wilson, M. (Eds). (2017). Understanding Spatial Media. Sage.
- Kitchin, R., Lauriault, T.P. & McArdle, G. (Eds) (2017) Data and the City. Routledge.
- Ash, J., Kitchin, R. and Leszczynski, A. (Eds) (2018) Digital Geographies. Sage.
- Coletta, C., Evans, L., Heaphy, L. & Kitchin, R. (eds) (2018) Creating Smart Cities. Routledge.
- Cardullo, P., di Feliciantonio, C. & Kitchin, R. (eds) (2019) The Right to the Smart City. Emerald.
- Graham, M., Kitchin, R., Mattern, S. & Shaw, J. (eds) (2019). How to Run a City Like Amazon, and Other Fables. Meatspace Press, Oxford. OA
- Kitchin, R. & Fraser, A. (2020) Slow Computing: How To Create More Balanced Digital Lives. Bristol University Press.
- Kitchin, R. (2021). Data Lives: How Data Are Made and Shape Our World. Bristol University Press.
- Kitchin, R. (2024/2014).The Data Revolution: Big Data, Open Data, Data Infrastructures and Their Consequences. Sage.
- "Digital Timescapes: Technology, Temporality and Society" (Polity Press, 2023).
- Gilmartin, M., Hubbard, P., Kitchin, R. & Roberts, S. (eds) (2024/2010/2004) Key Thinkers on Space and Place. 3rd edition. Sage.
- Ash, J., Kitchin, R. & Leszczynski, A. (2024). Researching Digital Life: Orientations, Methods and Practice. Sage.
