= Steven S. Wildman =

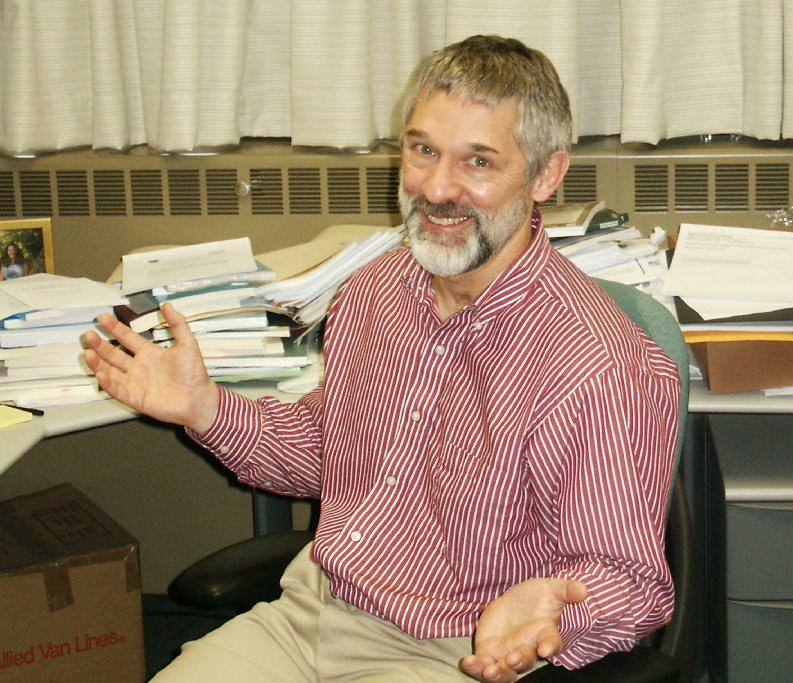
Steven S. Wildman

Steven S. Wildman is an American scholar, academic and researcher who teaches and researches at the Department of Telecommunication, Information Studies and Media at Michigan State University in East Lansing, Michigan. Wildman is also co-director of the university's Quello Center for Telecommunication Management and Law.

== Education ==
Wildman holds a B.A. in economics from Wabash College, as well as a MA and PhD in the same field from Stanford University. He joined Michigan State University in 1999. He is a graduate from Warsaw Community High School in Warsaw, Indiana.

== Current position ==
In August 1999, Wildman became the Quello Center's first director, holding the endowed James H. Quello Chair for Telecommunication Studies, joined by Barbara A. Cherry as associate director and associate professor in the Department of Telecommunication. In 2001, Johannes M. Bauer joined the center and is now its co-director. Before coming to MSU and the Quello Center, Professor Wildman was associate professor of communication studies and Director of the Program in Telecommunications Science, Management and Policy, Northwestern University, assistant professor of economics at UCLA and senior economist, at Economists Incorporated. His research fields include media economics and policy (which also covers the internet and other new media), institutional underpinnings of law and regulation for communication industries, and universal service policy and formal models of communication processes. He is co-editor of The Journal of Media Economics. Wildman is the co-author or co-editor of five books, including Video Economics and Making Universal Service Policy, and numerous articles on economics and policy for communication industries. He is Chief Economist at the Federal Communications Commission, a position he has held since December 2012. He holds this position while on leave from his position at Michigan State University.

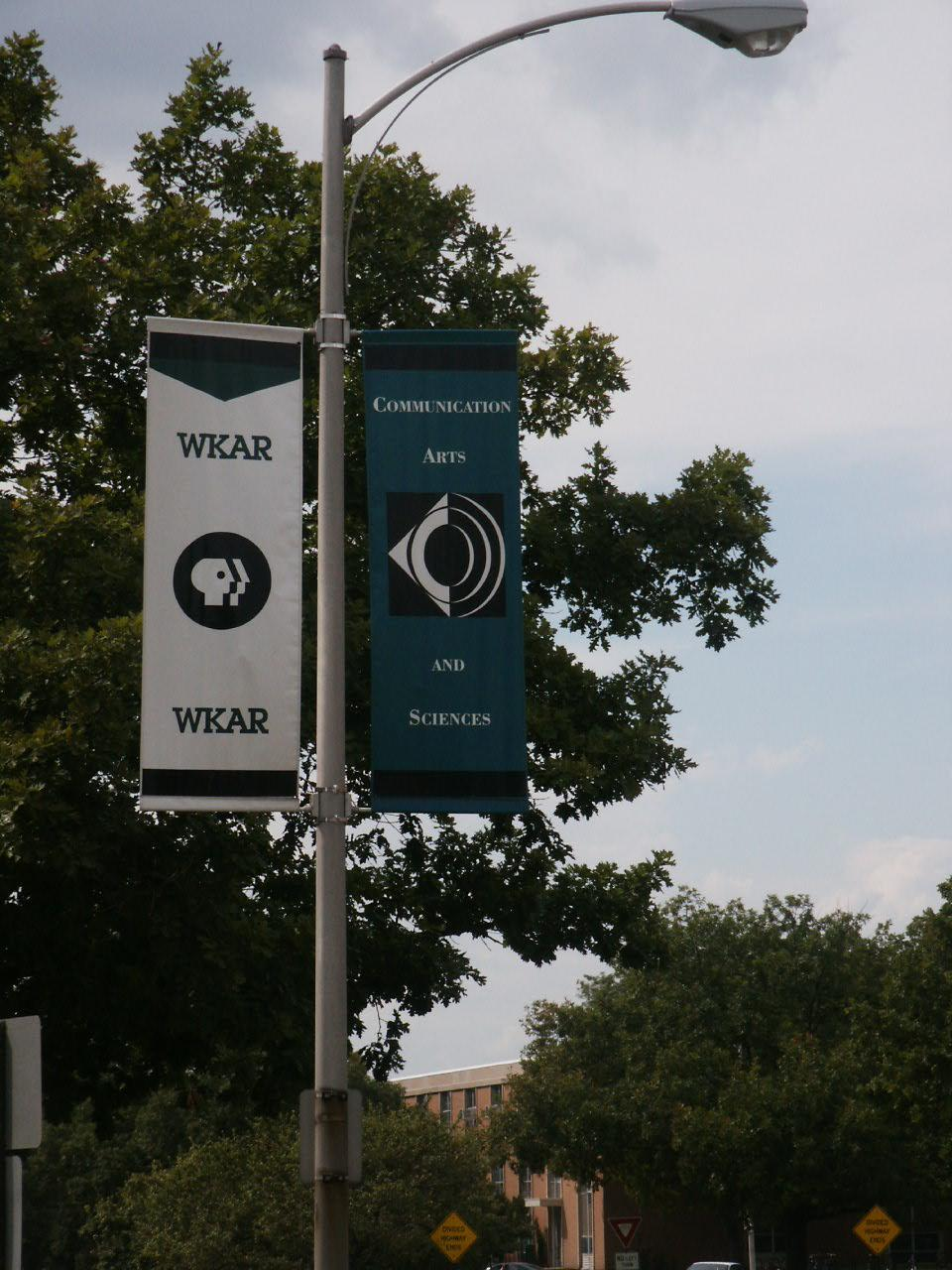
Michigan State University
