= European Media Management Association =

The European Media Management Association (EMMA) is an international not-for-profit organisation for professionals and academics in media management.

EMMA was founded in 2003 as the European Media Management Education Association, but was renamed European Media Management Association in 2014. It has some 150 members for 20 European universities. The main activity of EMMA is the annual conference.

A biannual doctoral summer school is organised. The EMMA is associated with a peer-reviewed academic journal, Journal of Media Business Studies, which covers business aspects of media enterprises, including media economics, strategic management, marketing, entrepreneurship, and finance. The journal was established in 2004 by founding editor-in-chief Robert G. Picard, and is published by Taylor & Francis. The editor-in-chief is Leona Achtenhagen Jönköping University. The journal is abstracted and indexed in EBSCO Business Source Complete, CIOS, and Communications Abstracts.

== Executive board ==
- President: Ulrike Rohn from Tallinn University / (Baltic Film and Media School)
- Deputy President: Päivi Maijanen from LUT University
- Secretary: Sari Virta from Metropolia University
- Treasurer: Ramona Dremljuga from Tallinn University / (Baltic Film and Media School)
- Special Projects / Special Interest Groups: Sabine Baumann from Jade University of Applied Sciences
- Communication Portfolio: Bianca Harms from NHL Stenden University and University of Groningen
- Summer School: Miguel Crespo from ISCTE- University Institute of Lisbon
- Conference: Joaquin Cestino from Jönköping University

== EMMA presidents ==
- 2003-2005: Alfonso Sanchez-Tabernero from Universidad de Navarra
- 2006-2008: Heinz-Werner Niestedt from Johannes Gutenberg University Mainz (JGU)
- 2008-2010: Lucy Küng from University of Oxford
- 2010-2012: Charles Brown from Westminster University
- 2012-2016: Gregory Ferrell Lowe University of Tampere

== Previous conferences ==
- 2019 Limassol
- 2018 Warsaw
- 2017 Ghent
- 2016 Portugal
- 2015 Hamburg
- 2014 Tallinn
- 2013 Bournemouth
- 2012 Budapest
- 2011 Moscow
- 2010 London
- 2009 Paris
- 2008 Barcelona
- 2007 Zurich
