= Structure and Dynamics: eJournal of the Anthropological and Related Sciences =

Structure and Dynamics: eJournal of Anthropological and Related Sciences (ISSN 1554-3374) is an open access, free, peer-reviewed journal edited by Douglas R. White at the Institute for Mathematical Behavioral Sciences at the University of California, Irvine. The journal is part of the University of California eScholarship collection.

Structure and dynamics is the name of a subfield in the social sciences, used particularly in social anthropology and sociology, which connotes that while structure is an important concept in social theory, contemporary social theory has long since moved beyond structural functionalism, which was identified with Radcliffe-Brown and Talcott Parsons. It is also an important subfield in the complexity sciences.

== See also ==
- List of social science journals § Anthropology
