= Measuring Business Excellence =

- Discipline: Performance management and measurement
- Language: English
- Edited by: Jos van Iwaarden, Giovanni Schiuma

Publication details
- History: 1997-present
- Publisher: Emerald Group Publishing
- Frequency: Quarterly

Standard abbreviations
- ISO 4: Meas. Bus. Excell.

Indexing
- ISSN: 1368-3047
- LCCN: 2006233165
- OCLC no.: 475935133

Links
- Journal homepage; Online access

Measuring Business Excellence is a quarterly peer-reviewed academic journal covering Performance management and measurement. The editors-in-chief are Jos van Iwaarden (RSM Erasmus University) and Giovanni Schiuma (Università degli Studi della Basilicata). The journal was established in 1997 and is published by Emerald Group Publishing in association with the Performance Management Association. The journal is abstracted and indexed in ABI/Inform, DIALOG, Inspec, ProQuest databases, and Scopus.
