= Tourist motivation =

Psychological forces that lead people to travel for leisure

Tourist motivation refers to the psychological forces that lead people to travel for leisure and that shape their choice of destination, activity and travel companion. It has been one of the central topics of tourism research since the 1970s, on the argument that motivation precedes and helps explain destination choice, satisfaction and subsequent behaviour.

== Push and pull factors ==
The distinction between push and pull factors is the most widely used framework in the field. Push factors are internal forces that dispose a person to travel at all, while pull factors are attributes of a destination that attract a traveller once the decision to travel has been made. Dann proposed two push factors in particular: anomie, the wish to escape a normless or isolating everyday environment, and ego-enhancement, the wish for recognition and status that travel can confer.

Crompton extended the account by identifying nine motives from in-depth interviews. Seven were socio-psychological and largely independent of the destination itself: escape from a perceived mundane environment, exploration and evaluation of self, relaxation, prestige, regression, enhancement of kinship relationships, and facilitation of social interaction. Two further motives, novelty and education, were tied to the attributes of the destination.

== Escaping and seeking ==
Iso-Ahola argued that tourist motivation can be reduced to two simultaneous forces: escaping routine personal and interpersonal environments, and seeking psychological rewards that are personal, such as competence and learning, or interpersonal, such as contact with others. On this account the same trip serves both functions at once, and the balance between them varies between travellers and over time.

== Travel career ladder and travel career pattern ==
Pearce proposed the travel career ladder, which arranges tourist motives in five levels loosely analogous to Maslow's hierarchy of needs: relaxation, stimulation, relationship, self-esteem and development, and fulfilment. The model's distinctive claim is developmental: as people accumulate travel experience, the motives that dominate their choices change, so that motivation is a function of a travel "career" rather than a fixed trait.

The ladder was later revised by Pearce and Lee into the travel career pattern, which drops the strict hierarchy in favour of layers of motives. A core of novelty, escape and relaxation, and relationship motives was reported across all levels of travel experience, while surrounding layers of motives differed systematically between more and less experienced travellers, with experienced travellers placing greater weight on host-site involvement and self-development.

== Psychographic typology ==
A separate tradition classifies travellers by personality rather than by motive. Plog placed travellers on a continuum from psychocentric, preferring familiar and well-developed destinations, to allocentric, preferring novel and less developed ones, and used the distribution of these types to explain why destinations rise and then decline in popularity as their visitor mix changes.

== Evolutionary approach ==
A more recent line of work applies evolutionary psychology to tourist behaviour, arguing that travel decisions which appear to be products of modern life are shaped by psychological mechanisms that evolved because they helped ancestral humans survive and reproduce, and that such ultimate explanations sit alongside rather than replace the proximate motives studied in the established models.

== Criticism ==
Reviews of the field have noted recurring difficulties. Motives are usually measured by self-report, so respondents may not be able or willing to state why they travelled, and socially approved reasons tend to be over-reported. The concepts of motive, need and value have often been used interchangeably, and the push–pull distinction, while useful as a description, does not by itself specify how internal and destination factors combine.

== See also ==
- Tourism
- Tourism geography
- Motivation
