= Information & Media =

Scholarly journal published in Lithuania

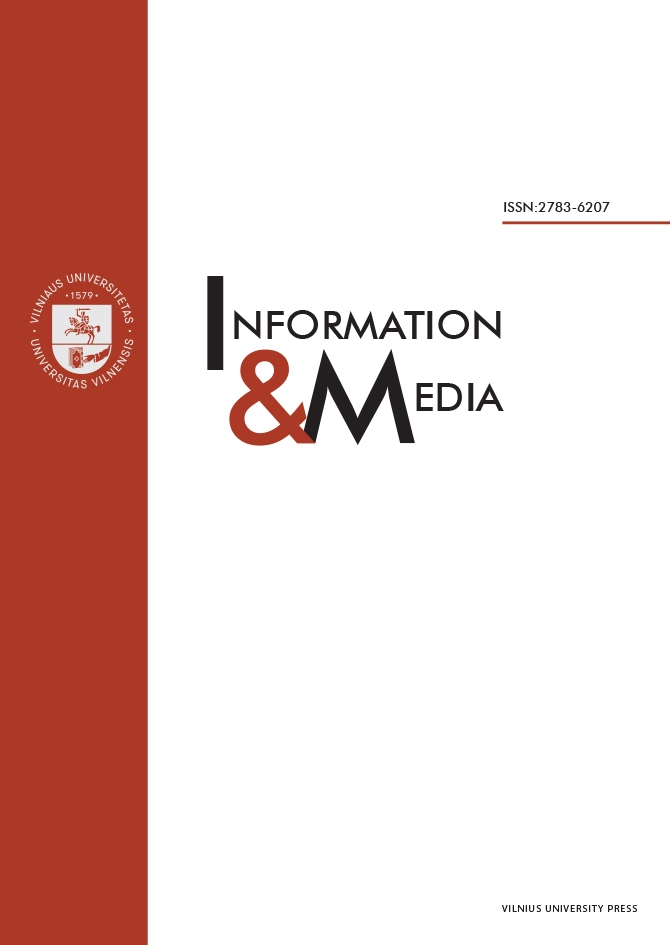
- IM
- Former editors: Vladislav V. Fomin, Elena Macevičiūtė, Zenona Atkočiūnienė, Renaldas Gudauskas
- Categories: Science, culture, communication, information, media
- Frequency: Two volumes per year (continuous publication).
- Publisher: Vilnius University Press.
- Founder: Vilnius University Faculty of Communication
- Founded: 1994
- Country: Lithuania
- Language: English and Lithuanian
- Website: www.journals.vu.lt/IM
- ISSN: 2783-6207

Information & Media, formerly known as Informacijos mokslai. is an academic journal that publishes peer-reviewed scholarly papers in the wide field of information and communication sciences. It is published by Vilnius University. Editor-in-Chief Saulius Keturakis. Previous Editors-in-Chief were Vladislav V. Fomin, Elena Macevičiūtė, Zenona Atkočiūnienė, and Renaldas Gudauskas.

== History ==
Information & Media (since 2021) was established on March 4, 1992 (certificate of establishment No. 389) as Informacijos mokslai, when the system of scholarly journal publications one of the most important in Lithuania – Vilnius University – was updated. The initiative group for establishing Informacijos mokslai consisted of Vilnius University scholars Arūnas Augustinaitis, Romualdas Broniukaitis, Renaldas Gudauskas, Julija Čepytė, Vilija Gudonienė, Ala Miežinienė, and Marija Prokopčik.

On October 27, 1994, the Senate of Vilnius University approved the first editorial board of Informacijos mokslai, which consisted of six members: Arūnas Augustinaitis, Renaldas Gudauskas (executive editor), Vilija Gudonienė, Ala Miežinienė, Marija Prokopčik (executive secretary), and Pranas Zvinys.

On November 9, 1994, Informacijos mokslai was registered in the international register of serial publications in Lithuania. The ISSN register standard number provided is 1392–0561. Soon the first 1994 issue was released, which was published at the beginning of 1995. It was a small-format, 6.44 author sheet publication, with a circulation of 150 copies. The publication begins with an extensive foreword by the Editor-in-Chief in Lithuanian and English, which describes the aims and scope of the journal and the expected issues. Eight scientific and two informative articles were published in the first issue, five of them by foreign authors. Since 2007, Informacijos mokslai has been available online – starting with the volume 40. In 2021, the journal was renamed to Information & Media. A new ISSN number was provided – 2783–6207. Information & Media continues the publication of Informacijos mokslai (1392–0561, 1392–1487)

== Thematics ==
Journal publishes papers on the following topics: media technology; media management; information systems and management; management of technology and innovation; information and knowledge management; information and knowledge society, its legislative, technological, cultural and economic aspects; organisational communication; gender communication; international and intercultural communication; media culture.

Information & Media will consider submissions of different types: a) peer-reviewed: research article, practitioner's views; b) reviewed by the editorial board: comment, world reports and news.

Information & Media also publishes editorials written in-house by the journal's editorial team and signed by the journal. Editorials are reviewed by the editorial board.

== Publishing ==
Two volumes are published per year (continuous publication). The journal publishes articles in Lithuanian and English. Registered in the Scopus database since 2018. The CiteScore in 2021 was 0.3, 26th percentile (0.0 in 2018, 0.1 in 2019, 0.2 in 2020). Information & Media is a diamond open access scholarly journal. All its contents are available free of charge, the right is granted to read, save, copy, distribute, print; no permission of the publisher or author is required. There are no article publication fees. Access to articles published in the journal is provided under the Creative Commons Attribution 4.0 License, CC BY 4.0. The journal is awarded the DOAJ Seal, which means that the journal meets the highest open access criteria. Included in the whitelist database Cabells.

Articles are published in PDF and HTML formats. In 2021, a total of 74,980 full-text downloads were recorded.
