= International Encyclopedia of Human Geography =

2009 reference work by Nigel Thrift

The International Encyclopedia of Human Geography
- Author: Rob Kitchin; Nigel Thrift
- Language: English
- Subject: Geography
- Genre: Encyclopedia
- Publisher: Elsevier
- Publication date: August 2009
- Media type: Print (hardback) and online
- Pages: 8,250 pp.
- ISBN: 978-0-08-044911-1 (print) ISBN 978-0-08-044910-4 (online)
- OCLC: 297799521

The International Encyclopedia of Human Geography is a 2009 academic reference work covering human geography. The editors-in-chief are Rob Kitchin and Nigel Thrift and it contains a foreword by Mary Robinson.

== Controversy ==
The development of the encyclopedia has been subject to episodic controversy resulting from the involvement of a subsidiary of Elsevier's parent company Reed Elsevier – called Spearhead Exhibitions – in the defence exhibition industry. Following a high-profile campaign coordinated on the crit-geog-forum mailing list and focused specifically on a perceived conflict of interest between the arms trade and academic publishing, on June 1, 2007 Reed Elsevier announced that it would be exiting the business during the second half of that year.
