= Social Work in Public Health =

- Discipline: Public health, social work
- Language: English
- Edited by: Marvin Feit, Stanley Battle

Publication details
- Former name(s): Journal of Health & Social Policy
- History: 1989-present
- Publisher: Routledge
- Frequency: Bimonthly
- Impact factor: 0.604 (2016)

Standard abbreviations
- ISO 4: Soc. Work Public Health

Indexing
- ISSN: 1937-1918 (print); 1937-190X (web)
- LCCN: 2007214998
- OCLC no.: 613468186

Links
- Journal homepage; Online access; Online archive

Social Work in Public Health is a bimonthly peer-reviewed scientific journal covering social work as it relates to public health. It was established in 1989 as the Journal of Health & Social Policy, obtaining its current name in 2007. It is published by Routledge and the editors-in-chief are Marvin Feit (Norfolk State University) and Stanley Battle (University of St. Joseph). According to the Journal Citation Reports, the journal has a 2016 impact factor of 0.604, ranking it 32nd out of 40 journals in the category "Social Work" and 141st out of 145 in the category "Public, Environmental, & Occupational Health".
