= Robert G. Picard =

American writer and scholar (born 1951)

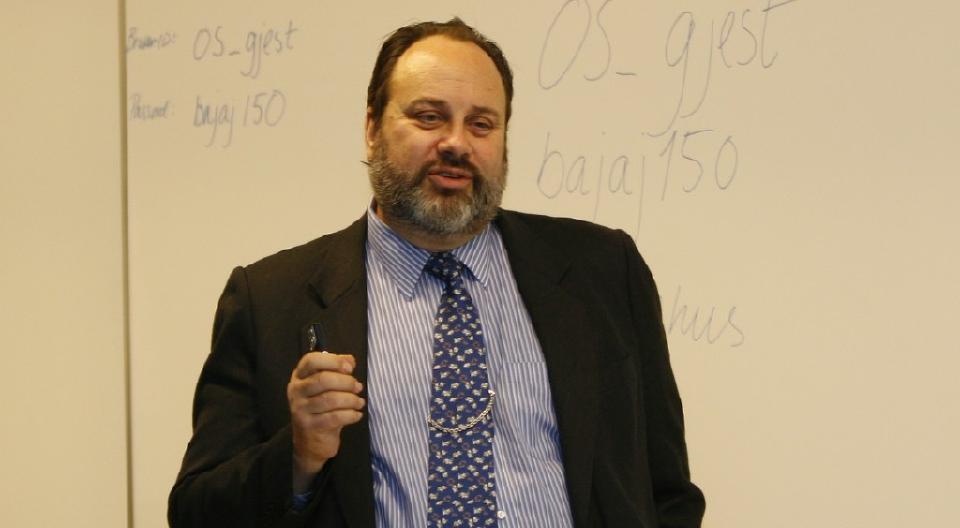
Robert G. Picard

Robert Georges Picard (born 1951) is an American writer and scholar in the field of media businesses and media policy economics. He heavily influenced media economics studies.

Picard taught at Harvard University and University of Oxford. He is the author and editor of more than 32 books including Media and Communications Policy Making: Processes, Dynamics and International Variations, Handbook of the Economics of the Media, The Economics and Financing of Media Companies, Media Product Portfolios, Media Economics: Concepts and Issues, and Joint Operating Agreements: The Newspaper Preservation Act and Its Application.

Now a professor emeritus, he remains a senior research fellow at the Reuters Institute for the Study of Journalism at University of Oxford, a fellow of the Royal Society of Arts, a fellow at the Information Society Project of Yale University Law School, author of the blog The Media Business, and was previously editor of The Journal of Media Economics and Journal of Media Business Studies. He was formerly Director of Research at the Reuters Institute for the Study of Journalism and a research fellow at Green Templeton College, Oxford.

Among his most important contributions have been the co-development of a method for assessing the economic contributions of copyright to national economies that is used by the World Intellectual Property Organization, analyses of the effects of media subsidies and other public support on companies and markets, studies exploring the economic influences on media behavior, and analysis of economic issues in media and communications policy.

Picard received a Ph.D. from the University of Missouri, an M.A. from Oxford University, an M.A. from California State University, Fullerton, and a B.A. from Loma Linda University. He has been a fellow at the Joan Shorenstein Center on the Press, Politics and Public Policy at the John F. Kennedy School of Government at Harvard University and the Reuters Institute for the Study of Journalism, Department of Politics and International Relations, University of Oxford. He received Doctorate Honoris Causa degrees from University of Navarra, Spain, Aristotle University, Greece, and Université de Neuchâtel, Switzerland.

He has previously been on the faculties of Louisiana State University, California State University, Fullerton, Turku School of Economics (Finland), and Jönköping International Business School (Sweden). He has been a visiting professor at the University of Paris, Shanghai University, the University of Amsterdam, Catholic University in Lisbon, Portugal, and Universidad Rey Juan Carlos in Madrid, Spain.

He founded and was chair of the World Media Economics and Management Conference, a biennial global gathering of scholars and practitioners, for a quarter of a century.

He has consulted for media firms on four continents and provided testimony and consulting in court cases, congressional and parliamentary hearings, and administrative hearings in North America and Europe. He regularly works with media associations worldwide and is widely quoted in both the trade publications and the general press.

An annual award for the best published work was named after him by the Media Management and Economics Division of the Association for Education in Journalism and Mass Communication in 2000 and the European Media Management Education Association presented him it 2010 award for lifetime contributions to the field.

== Selected bibliography ==
- Robert G. Picard, “Limits of the First Amendment and Antitrust Law in Platform Governance and Media Reform,” First Amendment Law Review, 18(2):94-122 (2020).
- Robert G. Picard, “The Sisyphean Pursuit of Media Pluralism: European Efforts to Establish Policy and Measurable Evidence”, Communication Law and Policy, 22(3):255–273 (2017).
- Robert G. Picard. The Economics and Financing of Media Companies, 2nd edition. New York: Fordham University Press, 2011.
- Robert G. Picard. “A Note on Economic Losses Due to Theft, Infringement, and Piracy of Protected Works,” Journal of Media Economics, 17(3):207-217 (2004).
- Robert G. Picard. “Twilight or New Dawn of Journalism? Evidence from the Changing News Ecosystem,” Journalism Studies, 15(4): 1-11 (2014).
- Robert G. Picard. “Isolated and particularised: The state of contemporary media and communications policy research,” Javnost/The Public, 23(2):135-152 (2016).
- Robert G. Picard. “Money, Media, and the Public Interest,” pp. 337-350 in Geneva Overholser and Kathleen Hall Jamieson, eds. The Institutions of Democracy: The Press. Oxford University Press, 2005.
- Robert G. Picard. “The Challenges of Public Functions and Commercialized Media,” pp. 211-229 in Doris Graber, Denis McQuail, and Pippa Norris, eds. The Politics of News: The News of Politics. 2nd edition. Washington, DC: Congressional Quarterly Press, 2007.
- Robert G. Picard. “Funding Digital Journalism: The Challenges of Consumers and the Economic Value of News,” in Bob Franklin and Scott A. Eldridge II, eds. Routledge Companion to Digital Journalism Studies. London: Routledge, 2016.
- Robert G. Picard. “Financial Challenges of 24-Hour News Channels,” in Richard Sambrook and Stephen Cushion eds., The Future of 24-hour News: New Directions, New Challenges. London: Peter Lang, 2016.
- Robert G. Picard and John Busterna. Joint Operating Agreements: The Newspaper Preservation Act and Its Application. Norwood, N.J.: Ablex Publishing, 1993.
- Robert G. Picard and Charlie Karlsson, eds. Media Clusters: Spatial Agglomeration and Content Capabilities. Cheltenham: Edward Elgar Publishing, 2011.
- Robert G. Picard and Steven S. Wildman, eds. Handbook of the Economics of the Media. Cheltenham: Edward Elgar Publishing, 2015.
- Richard van der Wurff, Piet Bakker and Robert G. Picard. “Economic Growth and Advertising Expenditures in Different Media in Different Countries”, Journal of Media Economics, 21(1):28-52 (2008).
