= Stuart Croft (political scientist) =

British political scientist

Stuart Croft FRSA

Vice Chancellor of the University of Warwick
- Incumbent
- Assumed office February 2016
- Preceded by: Nigel Thrift

Personal details
- Born: 7 March 1963 (age 63)
- Education: University of Southampton (BSc, MSc, PhD)

Academic work
- Discipline: Political science
- Sub-discipline: International security Counterterrorism
- Institutions: University of Warwick; University of Birmingham

Stuart John Croft (born 7 March 1963) is a British political scientist and the Vice-Chancellor of Warwick University, a position he has held since 2016. He received a Ph.D. from Southampton University and worked at Birmingham University before joining Warwick in 2007 as Professor of International Security. Croft has published widely in the field of international security and counter-terrorism and is a member of the Academy of Social Sciences and a fellow of the Royal Society of Arts.

== Group chat incident ==
On 1 February 2019, Croft published an open letter on the Warwick University website in response to an incident on campus via a group messenger application that resulted in the temporary suspension of 11 individuals. The letter, which does not mention the victims, was criticised in a response on The Boar – a student-run news website that first publicised the incident. Croft later published a follow-up indicating that two of the men whose ban was lifted would not return.

== Selected publications ==
- Culture, Crisis and America's War on Terror, Cambridge University Press, Cambridge, 2006.
- Securitizing Islam, Cambridge University Press, Cambridge, 2012.

Academic offices
Preceded by Nigel Thrift	Vice-Chancellor of the University of Warwick; 2016–	Succeeded by Incumbent
