= Journal of Media Economics =

- Discipline: Media economics
- Language: English
- Edited by: Michel Clement, Jan U. Becker

Publication details
- History: 1988-present
- Publisher: Routledge
- Frequency: Quarterly
- Impact factor: 0.417 (2018)

Standard abbreviations
- ISO 4: J. Media Econ.

Indexing
- ISSN: 0899-7764 (print); 1532-7736 (web)
- LCCN: sf96090646
- OCLC no.: 18128413

Links
- Journal homepage; Online access; Online archive

The Journal of Media Economics is a peer-reviewed academic journal covering all aspects of media economics published by Routledge.

The current editors-in-chief are Michel Clement (Marketing & Media, Hamburg Business School, University of Hamburg) and Jan. U. Becker (Kühne Logistics University, Hamburg).

The Journal of Media Economics has appointed a number of Area Editors (AEs) that are outstanding experts in their field. Specifically, the AEs represent the research fields: Media Economics, Econometrics, Analytics, Media Management, Entertainment Science, Media Strategy, Innovation Management & Digital Media, and Technology Management.

The journal was established in 1988 with Robert G. Picard as founding editor.

== Aims & Scope ==
The Journal of Media Economics publishes original research on the economics and policy of mediated communication, focusing on firms, markets, and institutions. Reflecting the increasing diversity of analytical approaches employed in economics and recognizing that policies promoting social and political objectives may have significant economic impacts on media, the journal encourages submissions reflecting the insights of diverse disciplinary perspectives and research methodologies, both empirical and theoretical.

Key topics discussed in the journal are media economics, media strategy, media policy, media management, econometrics, entertainment marketing, innovation management & digital media, and technology management.

== Idea Forum ==
Given the dynamic context of media, papers in the Idea Forum address novel and emerging topics or methods in the field of media economics – theoretically or empirically. Very new topics (e.g., the impact of COVID-19) that emerge with rather limited data available, but that are considered as important, novel, and worth to be discussed are of interest for this forum.

== Awards ==
The biannual Journal of Media Economics Award of Honor recognizes scholars whose work has played important roles in developing the field of media economics studies and its literature. Recipients of the award include:

Alan Albarran - USA

Benjamin M. Compaine - USA

Gillian Doyle - UK

Karl Erik Gustafsson - Sweden

Jaemin Jung - Korea

Barry Litman - USA

Stuart M. McFadyen – Canada

Alfonso Nieto - Spain

Sylvia Chan-Olmsted - USA

Bruce M. Owen - USA

Robert G. Picard – USA

Alfonso Sánchez-Tabernero – Spain

Nadine Toussaint-Desmoulins - France

Joel Waldfogel – USA

David Waterman – USA

Steven S. Wildman (Michigan State University)

The Journal of Media Economics Best Paper Award is given to papers published in the preceding calendar year to promote outstanding manuscripts. The awards will be presented biannually at the World Media Economics Conference.

== Past Editors ==
Nodir Adilov - (Purdue University Fort Wayne)

Alan Albarran - University of North Texas

Benjamin M. Compaine - (Northeastern University)

Brendan M. Cunningham - (U.S. Naval Academy)

Stephen Lacy - Michigan State University

Hugh Martin – (Ohio University)

Robert G. Picard - University of Oxford

Adam Rennhoff – Middle Tennessee State University

Steven S. Wildman (Michigan State University)
