= Nigel Thrift =

British human geographer and social scientist

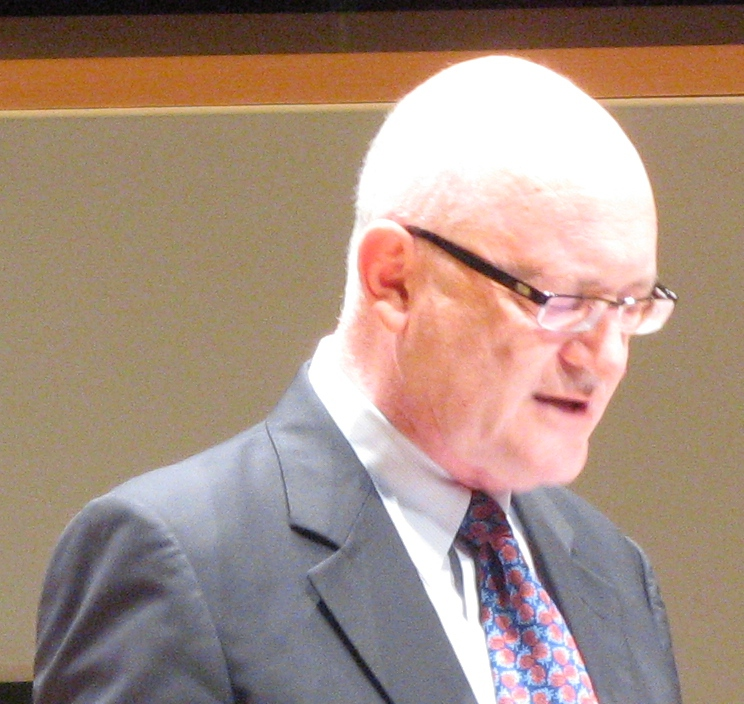
Nigel Thrift in 2011

Sir Nigel John Thrift DL FBA FAcSS FRSGS (born 12 October 1949) is a British academic and geographer. In 2018 he was appointed as Chair of the Committee on Radioactive Waste Management, a committee that gives independent scientific and technical advice on radioactive waste to the UK government and the devolved administrations. He is a visiting professor at the University of Oxford and Tsinghua University and an emeritus professor at the University of Bristol. In 2016 and 2017 he was the executive director of the Schwarzman Scholars, an international leadership program at Tsinghua University in Beijing. He was the Vice-Chancellor of the University of Warwick from 2006 to 2016. He is a leading academic in the fields of human geography and the social sciences.

== Early life and career ==
Thrift was born in 1949 in Bath, Somerset, brought up in Portishead and Clevedon, and educated at Nailsea School south west of Bristol. After a period working in a phosphorus factory, Thrift studied geography at the University of Wales, Aberystwyth and did his PhD at the University of Bristol. Thrift has held posts at a number of universities, including the University of Cambridge, the University of Leeds, the Australian National University, the University of Wales, Lampeter, the University of Bristol, and the University of Oxford.

In 2005 he was appointed vice-chancellor of the University of Warwick, taking up the position in July 2006 and leaving it in 2016 after the university's 50th anniversary year in 2015. Subsequently, Thrift served as Executive Director of Schwarzman Scholars until 2017, and was appointed as Chair of the UK Government's Committee on Radioactive Waste Management in 2018.

Thrift was knighted in the 2015 New Year Honours for services to higher education.

== Contribution to geography ==
Thrift has been described as one of the world's leading human geographers and social scientists. He was the third most highly cited human geographer between 1996 and 2017. In 1982 he co-founded the journal Environment and Planning D: Society and Space whilst serving as managing editor, from 1979 to 2012, of Environment and Planning A.

Thrift′s earlier work was most readily associated with the study of time, especially time-geography and the history of timekeeping. Another strand of work was associated with the study of economic geography, especially international finance, regional development, as well as research on financial exclusion, a field which he pioneered with Andrew Leyshon. His later work has paid attention to a variety of topics especially various aspects of cities (often with Ash Amin) including the impacts of warfare, cities as spaces of flows, and most recently their function as purveyors of animal death. Other topics have included consumption, affect in all of its forms, information technology, repair and maintenance (which again he pioneered, this time with Stephen Graham), higher education, and especially non-representational theory, a body of work that stresses the performative aspects of practice in Western societies. His work on time, language, power, representations, and the body has been particularly influential, and it has been suggested that Thrift's career reflects and in some cases spurred substantial intellectual changes in human geography in the 1980s,1990s and 2000s.

Non-representational theory is concerned with performative and embodied knowledges and is a radical attempt to wrench the social sciences and humanities out of an over-emphasis on representation and interpretation by moving away from contemplative models of human thought and action to those based on practice. Thrift has claimed that non-representational theory addresses the "unprocessual" nature of much of social and cultural theory. Major themes within non-representational theory include subjectification, space as a verb, technologies of being, embodiment, performance, and play and excess. Non-representational theory has provoked substantial debate within the field of human geography around the limits of the mediation of our world through language and how we might see, sense, and communicate beyond it.

Thrift has also edited and authored a number of books, encyclopaedias, and primers in human geography.

== University leadership ==
At Bristol, Thrift was Chair of the Research Assessment Panel and then the Research Committee.

At Oxford, Thrift served as head of the Life and Environmental Sciences Division before becoming Pro-Vice-Chancellor for Research.

Thrift's role as Vice Chancellor at Warwick saw him launch several new initiatives aimed at steadily increasing the university's research and teaching excellence, such as boosting the University's presence in London (an expansion of the Business School in The Shard building) and overseas (through a strong partnership with Monash University, and plans to develop a campus in Sacramento, California).

As a result of these initiatives and many others Warwick is now ranked firmly in the world's top 100 universities, and in the top 10 in the UK.

Thrift was a chair of a section of the British Research Assessment Exercise (Main Panel H, 2005–07 and member, 2001 Panel for Geography), chaired the Industry Commission on Higher Education (2012-) and the IPPR Commission on the Future of Higher Education.

== Controversies ==
In the financial year 2011–12, Thrift's salary rose by £50,000. Some students claimed that the pay raise was unjustified. In 2013 when a pay rise of £42,000 was announced, a small number of students again protested.

On 3 December 2014 police used CS spray to tackle protests at the University of Warwick, after a security guard was assaulted (two protestors, including a student were later prosecuted).

== Recognition and awards ==
- Knighted, for services to higher education (2015)
- Deputy Lieutenant for the West Midlands (2014)
- Honorary LLD, Monash University (2013)
- Honorary LLD, University of Bristol (2010)
- Scottish Geographical Society Gold Medal, Royal Scottish Geographical Society (2008)
- Distinguished Scholarship Honors, Association of American Geographers (2007)
- Victoria Medal of the Royal Geographical Society. (2003)
- Fellow of the British Academy (2003)(2003)
- Fellow, Academy of Learned Societies for the Social Sciences FAcSS (2000)
- Fellow, Swedish Collegium for Advanced Study (1999)
- University of Helsinki Medal (1999)
- Newbigin Prize, Royal Scottish Geographical Society (1998)
- Fellow, Netherlands Institute of Advanced Study (1993)
- Royal Geographical Society Heath Award (1988)

== Selected bibliography ==
=== Selected books ===
Thrift has written several monographs and co-authored books.

- Parkes D & Thrift N (1980) Times, Spaces and Places. A Chronogeographic Perspective, Chichester: John Wiley.
- Thrift N & Forbes, D (1986) The Price of War. Urbanisation in Vietnam, 1954-1985, Oxford: Blackwell.
- Peet R & Thrift N (Eds.) (1989) New Models in Geography: The Political-Economy Perspective, Boston: Unwin-Hyman.
- Pile S & Thrift N (Eds.) (1995) Mapping the Subject: Geographies of Cultural Transformation, New York, NY: Routledge.
- Thrift N (1996) Spatial Formations, Thousand Oaks, CA: Sage.
- Corbridge S, Martin R & Thrift N(Eds.) (1997) Money, Power and Space, Oxford: Blackwell.
- Leyshon A & Thrift N (Eds.) (1997) Money/Space: Geographies of Monetary Transformation, London: Routledge.
- Miller D, Jackson P, Holbrook B, Thrift N and Rowlands, M (1998) Shopping, Place and Identity, London: Routledge.
- Pile S and Thrift N (Eds.) (2000) City A-Z: Urban Fragments. London: Routledge.
- Crang M and Thrift N (eds.) (2000) Thinking Space (Critical Geographies) London: Routledge.
- Amin A, Massey D and Thrift N (2000) Cities for All the People Not the Few. Bristol: Policy Press.
- Thrift N and May J (eds.) (2001) Timespace: Geographies of Temporality. London: Routledge.
- Amin A and Thrift N (2002) Cities: Reimagining the Urban. Cambridge: Polity Press.
- Amin A Massey D and Thrift N (2003) Decentring the Nation. A Radical Approach to the Regions. London: Catalyst.
- Harrison S Pile S and Thrift N (eds.) (2004) Patterned Ground: Entanglements of Nature and Culture. London: Reaktion.
- Thrift N (2005) Knowing Capitalism (Theory, Culture and Society). London: Sage.
- Thrift N (2007) Non-Representational Theory. London: Routledge.
- Glennie P & Thrift N (2009) Shaping The Day: A History of Timekeeping in England and Wales 1300 – 1800. Oxford: Oxford University Press.
- Kitchin R. & Thrift N. (2009). The International Encyclopedia of Human Geography, Oxford and Boston: Elsevier Publishing.
- Amin A. and N. Thrift. (2013) Arts of the Political: New Openings For the Left. Durham, NC: Duke University Press.
- Thrift N, A. Tickell, S. Woolgar, and W.H. Rupp (eds.). 2014. Globalisation in Practice. Oxford University Press.
- Thrift N, A. Amin (2016) Seeing Like a City. Cambridge: Polity Press
- Thrift, N. (2021) Killer Cities. London: Sage
- Thrift, N. (2022) The Pursuit of Possibility. Redesigning Research Universities. Bristol: Bristol University Press.

=== Journal articles ===
- Thrift N (1981) "Owners time and own time: The making of capitalist time consciousness, 1300–1880" in Pred A (Ed.) Space and Time in Geography: Essays dedicated to Torston Hagerstrand, Lund: Lund Studies in Geography Series B, No. 48
- Thrift N (1983) "On the determination of social action in space and time", Environment and Planning D: Society and Space 1: pp. 23–57
- Thrift N (1997) "The Rise of Soft Capitalism" in Cultural Values, Volume 1, Number 1, 1997, pp. 29–57
- Thrift N (1999) "Steps to an Ecology of Place" in Massey D, Allen J & Sarre P (Eds.) Human Geography Today, Cambridge: Polity Press: pp. 295–323
- Thrift N (2000a) "Performing cultures in the new economy", Annals of the Association of American Geographers 4: pp. 674–692
- Thrift N (2000b) "Afterwords", Environment and Planning D: Society and Space 18 (3): pp. 213–255
- Thrift N & Olds K (1996) "Refiguring the economic in economic geography", Progress in Human Geography 20: pp. 311–337
- Thrift N (2004) "Intensities of Feeling: Towards a Spatial Politics of Affect" in Geografiska Annaler: Series B, Human Geography, Volume 86, Number 1, pp. 57–78
- Thrift N (2005) "But malice aforethought: cities and the natural history of hatred" in Transactions of the Institute of British Geographers, Volume 30, Number 2, pp. 133–150

Academic offices
Preceded by David VandeLinde	Vice-Chancellor of the University of Warwick; 2006–2016	Succeeded by Stuart Croft
