= Culture, Theory and Critique =

- Discipline: Social Theory, Cultural Studies, Anthropology, Philosophy
- Language: English
- Edited by: Greg Hainge

Publication details
- Former names: Renaissance and Modern Studies (1957-2001)
- History: 2002-present
- Publisher: Routledge
- Frequency: Quarterly

Standard abbreviations
- ISO 4: Cult. Theory Crit.

Indexing
- ISSN: 1473-5784 (print); 1473-5776 (web)

Links
- Journal homepage; Online access; Online archive

Culture, Theory and Critique is a quarterly peer-reviewed academic journal primarily in the fields of Social Theory and Cultural Studies.

== Abstracting and indexing ==
Culture, Theory and Critique is abstracted and indexed in:

- Scopus
- ABC-Clio
- America History & Life
- Historical Abstracts
- Humanities International Index
- International Bibliography of the Social Sciences
- MLA International Bibliography
- OCLC
