= Universum (journal) =

- Discipline: Social science, humanities
- Language: Spanish
- Edited by: Francisco Javier Pinedo

Publication details
- History: 1986-present
- Publisher: Instituto de Estudios Humanísticos Abate Juan Ignacio Molina University of Talca (Chile)
- Frequency: Biannual

Standard abbreviations
- ISO 4: Universum

Indexing
- ISSN: 0716-498X (print); 0718-2376 (web)
- LCCN: sf94090108
- OCLC no.: 30658971

Links
- Journal homepage

Universum is a peer-reviewed academic journal specialising in social sciences and humanities of Latin America. It is published by the Instituto de Estudios Humanísticos Abate Juan Ignacio Molina (University of Talca) and is also financed by the university with the sponsorship of local companies. The editor-in-chief is Francisco Javier Pinedo (University of Talca).
