= International Journal of Tourism Sciences =

- Discipline: Tourism
- Language: English
- Edited by: Joseph T. O'Leary, SooCheong (Shawn) Jang

Publication details
- History: 2001–present
- Publisher: Tourism Sciences Society of Korea (South Korea)
- Frequency: Triannually
- Open access: Yes

Standard abbreviations
- ISO 4: Int. J. Tour. Sci.

Indexing
- ISSN: 1598-0634

Links
- Journal homepage

The International Journal of Tourism Sciences is a peer-reviewed academic journal of tourism published triannually by the Tourism Sciences Society of Korea. The journal was established in 2001 and is listed in the Korea Citation Index. The current co-editors-in-chief is Timothy Lee, University of the Sunshine Coast, Queensland, Australia. The International Journal of Tourism Sciences is included in Charles Goeldner's Select List of Tourism Journals. and among the List of Scientific Journals in the Encyclopedia of Worldwide Tourism Research.
