= Asian Journal of Social Science =

Academic journal

- Discipline: Asian Studies
- Language: English
- Edited by: Joonmo Son; Eric C. Thompson

Publication details
- Former names: Southeast Asian Journal of Social Science (1973–2000); Southeast Asian Journal of Sociology (1968–1971)
- History: 1968–present
- Publisher: Elsevier- since 2021, before Brill
- Frequency: Quarterly
- Open access: Hybrid
- Impact factor: 1.2 (2024)

Standard abbreviations
- ISO 4: Asian J. Soc. Sci.

Indexing
- ISSN: 1568-4849 (print); 2212-3857 (web)

Links
- Journal homepage

Asian Journal of Social Science (AJSS) is a hybrid open access academic journal published by Elsevier Science on behalf of the Department of Sociology and Anthropology, National University of Singapore, covering Asian studies, ranging from sociology, anthropology, cultural studies, economics, geography, history, political science, and psychology. In addition to research papers, it also publishes book reviews, research notes, and short essays. AJSS was published by BRILL Publishers before 2021. The editors-in-chief of this journal are Joonmo Son and Eric C. Thompson.

This journal was established in 1968 and is abstracted and indexed by Social Sciences Citation Index and Scopus. According to the Journal Citation Reports, the journal has a 2024 impact factor of 1.2.
