= Behavioral and Social Sciences Librarian =

- Publisher: Routledge
- Country: United States
- Language: English

Behavioral and Social Sciences Librarian was a peer-reviewed journal published by Routledge, which is part of the Taylor & Francis Group. It was published quarterly with 4 issues per year, both in print (ISSN 0163-9269) and online (ISSN 1544-4546). It ceased publication in 2017.

Behavioral and Social Sciences Librarian first began publication in 1979 with four issues per volume. Then, from 1990 to 2006, the journal began releasing two issues per volume but resumed releasing four issues per volume in 2007. The journal focused "on the production, collection, organization, dissemination, retrieval, and use of information in the social and behavioral sciences. This peer-reviewed journal published articles on all aspects of behavioral and social sciences information, with emphasis on librarians, libraries, and the users of social science information in libraries and information centers."

At first, the journal mainly included articles and book or journal reviews. However, more recently, it included an editorial section and two other sections titled, "Electronic Roundup" and "Internet Connection" in addition to the main articles.
