= Norte Grande Geography Journal =

- Discipline: Geography
- Language: Spanish, English
- Edited by: Rodrigo Hidalgo Dattwyler

Publication details
- History: 1974–present
- Publisher: Pontifical Catholic University of Chile (Chile)
- Frequency: Triannually
- Open access: Yes

Standard abbreviations
- ISO 4: Norte Gd. Geogr. J.

Indexing
- ISSN: 0379-8682 (print); 0718-3402 (web)

Links
- Journal homepage; Online archive

Norte Grande Geography Journal or Revista de geografía Norte Grande is an academic journal published by the Pontifical Catholic University of Chile. Its scope was initially confined to geography related topics of northern Chile. In 1980 it changed its name from Norte Grande to Revista de geografía Norte Grande reflecting a broadened scope to encompass all of Chile extending to Latin American topics.

== Sources ==
- Revista de geografía Norte Grande Retrieved 10 September 2012.
- Revista de geografía Norte Grande: About the journal. Retrieved 10 September 2012.
