= Methodology (journal) =

- Discipline: Methodology
- Language: English
- Edited by: Tamás Rudas, Pablo Nájera

Publication details
- History: 2005–present
- Publisher: PsychOpen GOLD
- Frequency: Quarterly
- Open access: Yes
- License: CC-BY-4.0
- Impact factor: 1.4 (2024)

Standard abbreviations
- ISO 4: Methodology

Indexing
- ISSN: 1614-1881 (print); 1614-2241 (web)
- OCLC no.: 648990830

Links
- Journal homepage; Online access; Online archive

Methodology: European Journal of Research Methods for the Behavioral and Social Sciences is a biannual peer-reviewed academic journal covering social and behavioral science research methodology. It was established in 2005 by the merger of two other journals: Metodologia de las Ciencias del Comportamiento and Methods of Psychological Research-Online.

It was published from 2005-2019 by Hogrefe Publishing and since 2020 by PsychOpen GOLD (Leibniz Institute for Psychology) as an open-access journal. Methodology is the official journal of the European Association of Methodology. The editors-in-chief are Tamás Rudas (Eötvös Loránd University) and Pablo Nájera (Comillas Pontifical University).

According to the Journal Citation Reports, the journal has a 2024 impact factor of 1.7.

== Editors-in-chief ==
The following persons are or have been editor-in-chief:

- 2005–2008 Michael Eid (University of Murcia)
- 2005–2009 Manuel Ato (Free University of Berlin)
- 2009–2013 Joop Hox (Universiteit Utrecht)
- 2010–2011 Julio Sánchez-Meca (University of Murcia)
- 2012–2015 Nekane Balluerka (University of the Basque Country)
- 2014–2018 Peter Lugtig (Utrecht University)
- 2016–2021 Jose-Luis Padilla (University of Granada)
- 2018–2021 Jost Reinecke (Bielefeld University)
- 2021–2023 Marcelino Cuesta (University of Oviedo)
- 2021–2024 Katrijn van Deun (Tilburg University)
- 2023–2025 Isabel Benítez (University of Granada)
- 2024–present Tamás Rudas (Eötvös Loránd University)
- 2026-present Pablo Nájera (Comillas Pontifical University)
