= Tourist Studies =

- Discipline: Tourism
- Language: English
- Edited by: Gordon Waitt, Caroline Scarles

Publication details
- History: 2001-present
- Publisher: SAGE Publications
- Frequency: Triannually
- Impact factor: 1.147 (2016)

Standard abbreviations
- ISO 4: Tour. Stud.

Indexing
- ISSN: 1468-7976 (print); 1741-3206 (web)
- LCCN: 2002201839
- OCLC no.: 440824455

Links
- Journal homepage; Online access; Online archive

Tourist Studies is a triannual peer-reviewed academic journal that covers studies on tourism. Its editors-in-chief are Gordon Waitt (University of Wollongong) and Caroline Scarles (University of Surrey). Tim Edensor is an Editor Emeritus. The journal was established in 2001 and is published by SAGE Publications.

== Abstracting and indexing ==
The journal is abstracted and indexed in:

- Academic Premier
- Scopus
