= Abbia (journal) =

Cameroon academic journal

- Discipline: Area studies
- Language: English, French

Publication details
- History: 1962–1982
- Publisher: Ministry of Information (Cameroon)
- Frequency: Quarterly

Standard abbreviations
- ISO 4: Abbia

Indexing
- ISSN: 0001-3102
- LCCN: sn86013488
- OCLC no.: 241303153

Abbia: Cameroon Cultural Review (fr: Abbia: Revue Culturelle Camerounaise) was an academic journal covering the culture of Cameroon. It was established by Bernard Fonlon and Marcien Towa in 1962 and ran until 1982. Its influence was discussed by Milton Krieger in 1996 and 2014 as well as the contributors to Fonlon's Festschrift 1989. The journal exemplified Fonlon's beliefs about the importance of French-English bilingualism (see his article in Abbia V 4 1963 'A case for early bilingualism').

When the full text was made available in 2019 as part of the journal 'Vestiges- Traces of Record', Loreto Todd provided an introduction. This stressed the importance of Fonlon's contribution throughout Abbia's history and identified as particularly noteworthy his recognition of Cameroonian Pidgin as a significant language in its own right and the way that the political tide was turning in Cameroon as the country changed from Federation to united Republic. In 2024 these changes still have huge significance.
