= Journal of Social Work =

- Discipline: Social work
- Language: English
- Edited by: Steven M. Shardlow

Publication details
- History: 1997–present
- Publisher: SAGE Publishing
- Frequency: Quarterly
- Impact factor: 1.5 (2023)

Standard abbreviations
- ISO 4: J. Soc. Work

Indexing
- ISSN: 1468-0173 (print); 1741-296X (web)
- LCCN: 2002200175
- OCLC no.: 48009105

Links
- Journal homepage; Online access; Online archive

The Journal of Social Work is a peer-reviewed academic journal that covers research in the field of social work. The editor-in-chief is Steven M. Shardlow (Keele University). It was established in 2001 and is published by SAGE Publishing.

== Abstracting and indexing ==
The journal is abstracted and indexed in Scopus and the Social Sciences Citation Index. According to the Journal Citation Reports, the journal has a 2023 impact factor of 1.5.
