= Doreen Massey (geographer) =

British social scientist and geographer (b.1944)

Doreen Massey FRSA FBA FAcSS
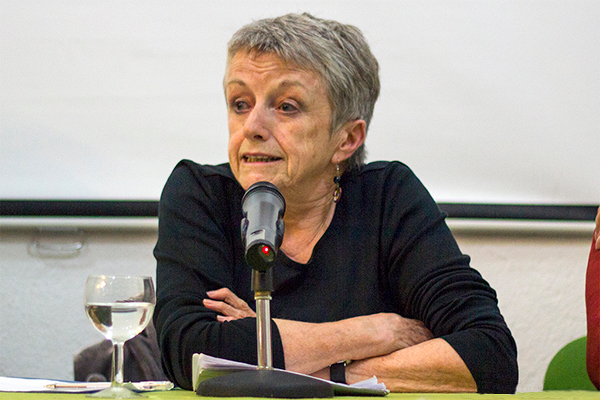
- Born: Doreen Barbara Massey; 3 January 1944; Manchester, England
- Died: 11 March 2016 (aged 72); Kilburn, London, England
- Citizenship: British
- Education: University of Oxford; University of Pennsylvania
- Awards: Victoria Medal (1994); Prix Vautrin Lud (1998)
- Scientific career
- Fields: Economic and social geography

Doreen Barbara Massey FRSA FBA FAcSS (3 January 1944 – 11 March 2016) was a British social scientist and geographer. She specialized in Marxist geography, feminist geography, and cultural geography, as well as other topics. She was Professor of Geography at the Open University.

== Career ==
Massey was born in Manchester, England, and spent most of her childhood in Wythenshawe, living on a council estate. She studied at Oxford University and later at the University of Pennsylvania, receiving a master's degree in Regional Science.

She then began her career at a thinktank: the Centre for Environmental Studies (CES) in London. CES contained several key analysts of the contemporary British economy. There, Massey established a working partnership with Richard Meegan, among others. When CES closed down, Massey then became professor of geography at the Open University.

Massey retired in 2009 but remained a frequent media commentator, particularly on industry and regional trends. As Professor Emerita at the Open University, she continued her speaking engagements and involvement in educational TV programmes and books.

Massey's main fields of study were globalisation, regional uneven development, cities, and the reconceptualisation of place. Although associated with an analysis of contemporary western capitalist society, she also worked in Nicaragua, South Africa and Venezuela.

Her work on space, place and power has been highly influential within a range of related disciplines and research fields.

== Theories ==
=== Economic geography ===
Massey's early work at CES established the basis for her spatial divisions of labour theory (Power Geometry), that social inequalities were generated by the unevenness of the capitalist economy, creating stark divisions between rich and poor regions and between social classes. "Space matters" for poverty, welfare and wealth.

Over the years, this theory has been refined and extended, with space and spatial relationships remaining central to her account of contemporary society.

=== Geography of gender ===
As a geographer, Massey (1994, 1999) brought the impact of space and place on gendered experiences into the theoretical context of describing spatial "values" in contemporary society, thus giving an added dimension, that of social grouping, of when justice is fair as well as equally accessed in space and place. She developed the concepts aired earlier by Bowlby et al on gender-shaped geography. On the editorial board of SEEDS, Massey furthered the understanding of economic geography and related impacts on women's lives as a constant theme throughout the practice-based regional reports, in a series edited by Robin Murray at S.E.E.D.S.

== Sense of place ==
While Massey has argued for the importance of place, her position accords with those arguing against essentialised or static notions, where:

- places do not have single identities but multiple ones.
- places are not frozen in time, they are processes.
- places are not enclosures with a clear inside and outside.

Massey used the example of Kilburn High Road in north-west London to exemplify what she termed a "progressive" or "global" sense of place, in the essay "A Global Sense of Place". In a podcast interview with Social Science Space, Massey talks about the idea of physical space being alive: "A lot of what I've been trying to do over the all too many years when I've been writing about space is to bring space alive, to dynamize it and to make it relevant, to emphasize how important space is in the lives in which we live. Most obviously I would say that space is not a flat surface across which we walk; Raymond Williams talked about this: you're taking a train across the landscape – you're not traveling across a dead flat surface that is space: you're cutting across myriad stories going on. So instead of space being this flat surface it's like a pincushion of a million stories: if you stop at any point in that walk there will be a house with a story. Raymond Williams spoke about looking out of a train window and there was this woman clearing the grate, and he speeds on and forever in his mind she's stuck in that moment. But actually, of course, that woman is in the middle of doing something, it's a story. Maybe she's going away tomorrow to see her sister, but really before she goes she really must clean that grate out because she's been meaning to do it for ages. So I want to see space as a cut through the myriad stories in which we are all living at any one moment. Space and time become intimately connected."

== Awards and honours ==
- 2014 - Presidential Achievement Award of the Association of American Geographers
- 2013 - Honorary Doctorate, Faculty of Mathematics and Natural Sciences, University of Zurich
- 2012 - Honorary Doctorate, Harokopio University, Athens
- 2010 - Hon DSc (Econ), Queen Mary University of London
- 2009 - Honorary Doctorate of Letters, University of Glasgow
- 2006 - Honorary DLitt, National University of Ireland
- 2006 - Honorary Doctorate of Science awarded by the University of Edinburgh
- 2003 - Centenary Medal of Royal Scottish Geographical Society
- 2003 - Anders Retzius Medal in Gold, awarded by the Swedish Society of Anthropologists and Geographers
- 2002 - Fellow, British Academy
- 2001 - Honorary Fellow, St. Hugh's College, University of Oxford
- 2000 - Fellow, Royal Society of Arts
- 1999 - Fellow, Academy of Social Sciences
- 1998 - Prix Vautrin Lud ("Nobel de Géographie")
- 1994 - Victoria Medal of the Royal Geographical Society

♯ Doreen Massey declined the award of an Order of the British Empire (OBE)

== Books ==
- Cordey-Hayes, M., & D. B. Massey (1970), An operational urban development model of Cheshire. London: Centre for Environmental Studies.
- Massey, D. B. (1971), The basic: service categorisation in planning London: Centre for Environmental Studies.
- Massey, D. B. (1974), Towards a critique of industrial location theory London: Centre for Environmental Studies.
- Massey, D. B., & P. W. J. Batey (eds)(1977), "Alternative Frameworks for analysis", London: Pion (ISBN 085086061X).
- Massey, D. B., & A. Catalano (1978), Capital and land: Landownership by capital in Great Britain. London: Edward Arnold (ISBN 0713161086 and 0713161094 pbk).
- Massey, D. B., & R. A. Meegan (1979), The geography of industrial reorganisation: The spatial effects of the restructuring of the electrical engineering sector under the industrial reorganisation corporation. Oxford and New York: Pergamon Press.
- Massey, D. B., & R. A. Meegan (1982), The anatomy of job loss: The how, why, and where of employment decline. London and New York: Methuen.
- Massey, D. B. (1984), Spatial divisions of labour: Social structures and the geography of production. New York: Methuen.
- Massey, D. B. (1987), Nicaragua. Milton Keynes, England and Philadelphia: Open University Press.
- Massey, D. B. (1988), Global restructuring, local responses. Atwood lecture. Worcester, Mass.: Graduate School of Geography, Clark University.
- Ginwala, F., M. Mackintosh & D. B. Massey (1991), Gender and economic policy in a democratic South Africa. Milton Keynes, UK: Development Policy and Practice, Technology Faculty, Open University.
- Massey, D. B. (1994), Space, place, and gender. Minneapolis: University of Minnesota Press.
- Massey, D. B. (1995), Spatial divisions of labor: Social structures and the geography of production, 2nd edition. New York: Routledge.
- Hall, S., Massey, D. B., & M. Rustin (1997), The next ten years. London: Soundings.
- Allen, J., D. B. Massey, A. Cochrane (1998), Rethinking the region. New York: Routledge.
- Massey, D. B (2005), For Space, London: Sage (ISBN 1412903610 & ISBN 1412903629).
- Massey, D. B. (2007), World City, Cambridge: Polity Press.
- Massey, D. B. (2010), World City, with new Preface: "After the Crash", July 2010. Cambridge: Polity Press.
