= Media economics =

Application of economic questions to media

Media economics embodies economic theoretical and practical economic questions specific to media of all types. Of particular concern to media economics are the economic policies and practices of media companies and disciplines including journalism and the news industry, film production, entertainment programs, print, broadcast, mobile communications, Internet, advertising and public relations. Deregulation of media, media ownership and concentration, market share, intellectual property rights, competitive economic strategies, company economics, "media tax" and other issues are considered parts of the field. Media economics has social, cultural, and economic implications. Regular study of media economic issues began in the 1970s but flourished in the 1980s with the addition of classes on the subject at U.S. and European universities. The Journal of Media Economics began publishing in 1988, edited by Robert G. Picard, one of the founding fathers of the discipline. Since that time the field of inquiry has flourished and there are now hundreds of universities offering courses and programs in media economics. Other significant figures in the field have included Steven S. Wildman, Alan Albarran, Bruce M. Owen, Ben Compaine, Ghislain Deslandes, Stuart McFadyen, Gillian Doyle, Karl Erik Gustafsson, Lucy Küng, Gregory Ferrell Lowe, Nadine Toussaint Desmoulins, Achour Fenni, Amanda D. Lotz, and Stephen Lacy.

Within academia, the location of media economics research varies depending upon the tradition and history of the institution. In some universities it is located in schools of business or economics, whereas in others it is located in communication, media or journalism schools (or departments).

The term "cultural economics" is sometimes used as a synonym for media economics but they are not substitutable. Cultural economics includes a wide variety of activities that do not necessarily involve mediated dissemination such as museums, symphonies, operas, and festivals. At times these may cross over into media economic issues, such as when audio or video recordings are made of performances or museum holdings are put on CDs.

== Worldwide media ==
There is no definitive list of every radio and television station in the world. The National Association of Broadcasters cites the estimate from the U.S. C.I.A. World Fact Book, which reports that "as of January 2000, there are over 21,500 television stations and over 44,000 radio stations." (CIA World Fact Book references – Radio, TV)

In the United States the FCC provides a list of "Licensed Broadcast Station Totals (Index) 1990 to Present," which may be found here. According to the FCC report –

- The commission has announced the following totals for broadcast stations licensed as of March 31, 2004

| TYPE | NUMBER |
|---|---|
| AM RADIO | 4781 |
| FM RADIO | 6224 |
| FM EDUCATIONAL | 2471 |
| TOTAL | 13476 |

| TYPE | NUMBER |
| UHF COMMERCIAL TV | 773 |
| VHF COMMERCIAL TV | 589 |
|---|---|
| UHF EDUCATIONAL TV | 255 |
| VHF EDUCATIONAL TV | 127 |
| TOTAL | 1744 |

| TYPE | NUMBER |
|---|---|
| CLASS A UHF STATIONS | 498 |
| CLASS A VHF STATIONS | 112 |
| TOTAL | 610 |

| TYPE | NUMBER |
|---|---|
| FM TRANSLATORS & BOOSTERS | 3842 |
| UHF TRANSLATORS | 2658 |
| VHF TRANSLATORS | 2079 |
| TOTAL | 8579 |

| TYPE | NUMBER |
| UHF LOW POWER TV | 1605 |
| VHF LOW POWER TV | 523 |
| TOTAL | 2128 |

== Advertising revenues ==
In the United States, a report from the Radio Advertising Bureau (RAB) states that in 2002, radio's revenue reached $19.4 billion, an increase of 5.7% from the $17.7 billion earned in 2001. For additional details see RAB's Radio Fact Book. Total broadcast revenues for 2001 were $54.4 billion, as reported by The Television Advertising Bureau (TVB).

=== Advertiser spending ===
Quote – "Annually advertisers spend approximately $150 billion to sponsor TV and radio programs, in the hopes of making two-to-three times as much in return from media consumers who buy their products and services (Fox, 2002). From the 1970s to the 1990s, the daily number of ads targeted at the average American jumped from 560 to 3,000 (Fox, 2002). In that same time frame, the number of ads to which children were exposed increased from 20,000 per year (Adler et al., 1977) to more than 40,000 per year (Kunkel & Gantz, 1992; also see Strasburger, 2001).

== See also ==
- Broadcast syndication
- Mediatization (media), for the social and political consequences of media competition
