= Organization Studies (journal) =

- Discipline: Management, organization studies
- Language: English
- Edited by: Daniel Hjorth, Renate Meyer

Publication details
- History: 1980–present
- Publisher: SAGE Publications
- Frequency: Monthly
- Impact factor: 4.9 (2023)

Standard abbreviations
- ISO 4: Organ. Stud.

Indexing
- ISSN: 0170-8406 (print); 1741-3044 (web)
- LCCN: 82020032
- OCLC no.: 643034352

Links
- Journal homepage; Online access; Online archive

Organization Studies is a monthly peer-reviewed academic journal that covers the field of organization studies. The journal's editors-in-chief are Renate Meyer and Paolo Quattrone. It was established in 1980 and is published by SAGE Publications on behalf of European Group for Organizational Studies (EGOS).

Organization Studies accepts both empirical and conceptual articles. In 2019, EGOS announced the creation of a new open access journal dedicated to review and conceptual articles, called Organization Theory, and edited by Joep Cornelissen.

The journal played a prominent role in advancing New institutionalism.

== Abstracting and indexing ==
The journal is abstracted and indexed in Scopus and the Social Sciences Citation Index. According to the Journal Citation Reports, its 2023 impact factor is 4.9, ranking it 85 out of 401 journals in the category "Management". The journal is on the Financial Times top 50 list, along with only eight other generalist management journals.
