= Periodical literature =

Regularly scheduled published work

The cover of an issue of the open-access journal PLOS Biology, published monthly by the Public Library of Science

Periodical literature (singularly called a periodical publication or simply a periodical) consists of published works that appear in new releases on a regular schedule (issues or numbers, often numerically divided into annual volumes). The most familiar example of periodical literature is the newspaper, but the magazine and the journal are also periodicals. Some modern websites, e-journals, and other electronic-only publications produced recurrently on a schedule are also considered periodicals. Periodical publications cover a wide variety of topics, from academic, technical, and trade, to general-interest subjects such as leisure and entertainment.

Articles within a periodical are usually organized around a single main subject or theme and include a title, date of publication, author(s), and brief summary of the article. A periodical typically contains an editorial section that comments on subjects of interest to its readers. Other common features are reviews of recently published books and films, columns that express the authors' opinions about various topics, and advertisements.

A periodical is a serial publication. A book series is also a serial publication, but is not typically called a periodical. An encyclopedia or dictionary is also a book, and might be called a serial publication if it is published in many different editions over time. A periodical series, such as a journal series, is a sequence of journals having certain characteristics in common that are formally identified together as a group.

== Volumes and issues ==
Periodicals are typically published and referenced by volume and issue (also known as issue number or number). Volume typically refers to the number of years the publication has been circulated, and issue refers to how many times that periodical has been published during that year. For example, the April 2011 publication of a monthly magazine first published in 2002 would be listed as, "volume 10, issue 4". Roman numerals are sometimes used in reference to the volume number.

When citing a work in a periodical, there are standardized formats such as The Chicago Manual of Style. In the latest edition of this style, a work with volume number 17 and issue number 3 may be written as follows:

- James M. Heilman, and Andrew G. West. "Wikipedia and Medicine: Quantifying Readership, Editors, and the Significance of Natural Language." Journal of Medical Internet Research 17, no. 3 (2015). doi:10.2196/jmir.4069.

Sometimes, periodicals are numbered in absolute numbers instead of volume-relative numbers, typically since the start of the publication. In rare cases, periodicals even provide both: a relative issue number and an absolute number. There is no universal standard for indicating absolute numbers, but often a '#' is used.

The first issue of a periodical is sometimes also called a premiere issue or charter issue. The first issue may be preceded by dummy or zero issues. A last issue is sometimes called the final issue.

=== Frequency ===
Periodicals are often characterized by their period (or frequency) of publication. This information often helps librarians make decisions about whether or not to include certain periodicals in their collection. It also helps scholars decide which journal to submit their paper to.

Period	Meaning	Frequency
Quinquennially	Once per 5 years	1/5 per year
Quadriennially	Once per 4 years	1/4 per year
Triennially	Once per 3 years	1/3 per year
Biennially	Once per 2 years	1/2 per year
Annually	Once per year	1 per year
Semiannually, Biannually	Twice per year	2 per year
Triannually	Thrice per year	3 per year
Quarterly	Every quarter	4 per year
Bimonthly	Every 2 months	6 per year
Semi-quarterly	Twice per quarter	8 per year
Monthly	Every month	12 per year
Semi-monthly	Twice per month	24 per year
Biweekly, Fortnightly	Every two weeks	26 per year
Weekly	Every week	52 per year
Semi-weekly	Twice per week	104 per year
Daily	Once per business day	Varies

== Popular and scholarly ==
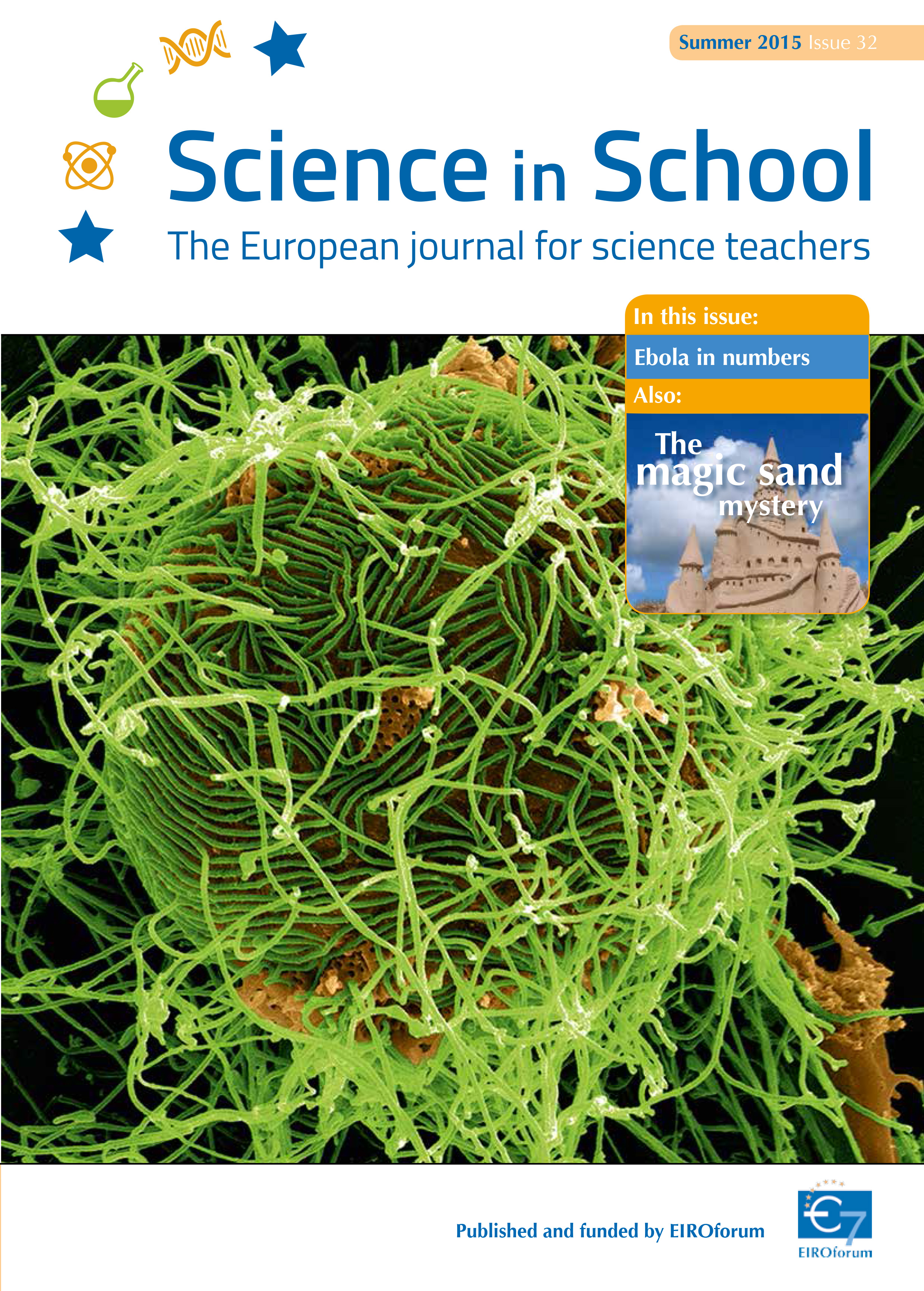
Cover of Science in School magazine

Periodicals are often classified as either popular or scholarly. Popular periodicals are usually magazines (e.g., Ebony and Esquire). Scholarly journals are most commonly found in libraries and databases. Examples are The Journal of Psychology and the Journal of Social Work.

Trade magazines are also examples of periodicals. They are written for an audience of professionals in particular fields. As of the early 1990s, there were over 6,000 academic, business, scientific, technical, and trade publications in the United States alone.

== Indefinite vs. part-publication ==
These examples are related to the idea of an indefinitely continuing cycle of production and publication: magazines plan to continue publishing, not to stop after a predetermined number of editions. By contrast, a novel might be published in monthly parts, a method revived after the success of The Pickwick Papers by Charles Dickens. This approach is called part-publication, particularly when each part is from a whole work, or a serial, for example in comic books. It flourished during the nineteenth century, for example with Abraham John Valpy's Delphin Classics, and was not restricted to fiction. A practical differentiation between a serially published book and a book series is that the first involves pieces of a book being released over time (e.g., chapters, sections) whereas the latter involves complete books being released one after another. The distinction is a little blurrier in the case of a multivolume reference book released via part-publication, where each volume is from one viewpoint a "whole book" but from another viewpoint not a whole work. The Encyclopædia Metropolitana and the London Encyclopædia were instances of the latter type.

== Standard numbers ==
The International Standard Serial Number (ISSN) is to serial publications (and by extension, periodicals) essentially what the International Standard Book Number (ISBN) is to books: a standardized reference number. However, the ISSN only identifies the overall serial, not any specific volume or issue, so is of much less utility in finding and accessing particular content.

== Distribution ==
Postal services often carry periodicals at a preferential rate; for example, Second Class Mail in the United States only applies to publications issued at least quarterly.

== See also ==
- Partwork
- Part
