= Media management =

Business administration discipline

Media management is a business administration discipline that identifies and describes strategic and operational phenomena and problems in the leadership of media enterprises. Media management contains the functions strategic management, procurement management, production management, organizational management and marketing of media enterprises.

A uniform definition of the term media management does not yet exist, and "the field of media management in its present form is neither clearly defined nor cohesive." Notwithstanding this fact, among existing definitions there is a shared base concerning the business administrative character of media management and the functional understanding of management. In the following a number of definitions are provided.

"Media Management consists of (1) the ability to supervise and motivate employees and (2) the ability to operate facilities and resources in a cost-effective (profitable) manner."

"The core task of media management is to build a bridge between the general theoretical disciplines of management and the specifities of the media industry."

"Media and internet management covers all the goal-oriented activities of planning, organization and control within the framework of the creation and distribution processes for information or entertainment content in media enterprises."

== Media enterprises and media markets ==
Media enterprises are strategically organized economic entities whose central work is generating and marketing of media. The generation of media is the bundling of internally and externally generated content and its transformation into a medium. The marketing is the direct or indirect distribution of media. The term media in this connection is restricted to one-to-many-communication with one sender and a large number of consumers. More precisely, the focus is on newspapers, magazines, books, music, television, films, internet and games. More details can be drawn from the graphic illustrating the definition of media enterprises.

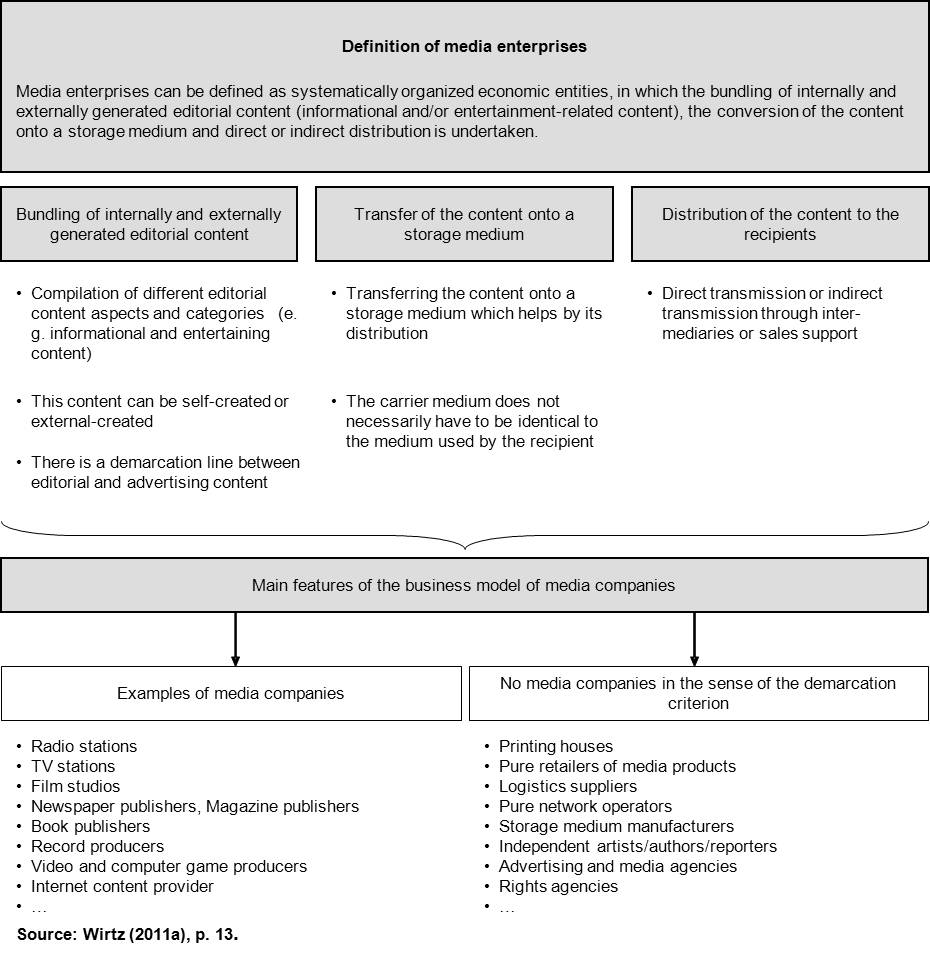
Image shows the definition of media companies.

In order to understand management in media enterprises it is crucial to build a larger picture of the media marketplace. The characteristics of media markets differ from markets of other economic sectors in several ways.

One characteristic of media markets is the multidimensional competition. Media enterprises operate in three different markets. They sell their services in form of content like information and entertainment, as well as in form of advertising space. These services are offered for different business markets. The content is offered to the consumer markets which differ depending on the type of media and the way it is used by consumers. The advertising spaces are traded on advertisement markets.

The third markets are procurement markets. They are needed as media enterprises generally do not produce all their offered content themselves but buy service packages of both, information and entertainment, from procurement markets. For example, authors and artists contracts or license and copyright deals can be acquired. But procurement markets can turn to business markets if, for example, complete rights to an event are purchased and then resold by a media enterprise in the form of secondary utilization rights. The described market structure is shown in the second image.

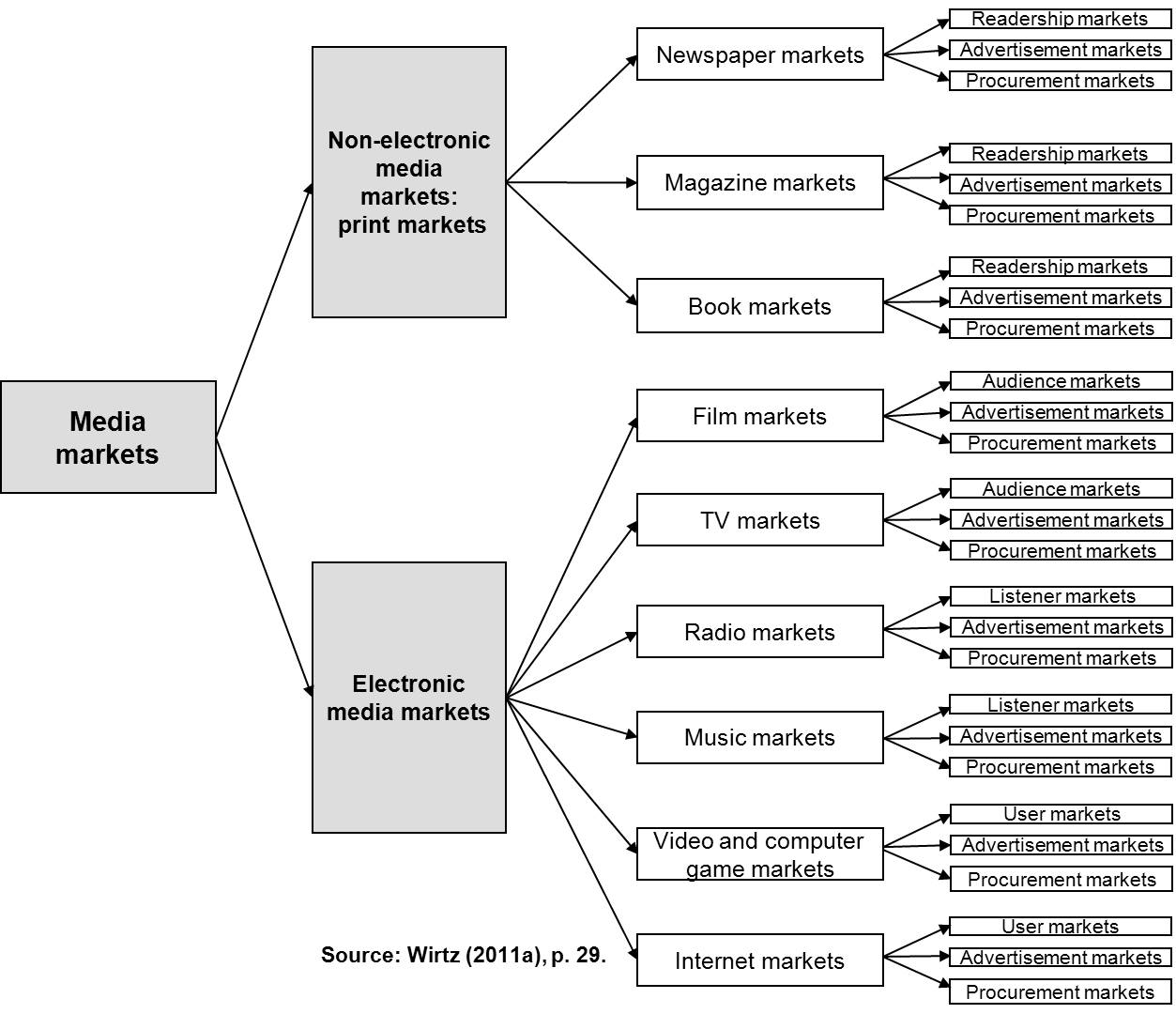
Image gives an overview of different media markets.

In fact, the three described media markets each media enterprise can be active in are strongly interdependent. But the intensity of their relationships differs. For example, there is a strong relationship between advertisement and consumer markets as the success among consumers drives advertising revenues. All possible inter-dependencies are pictured in the third graphic.

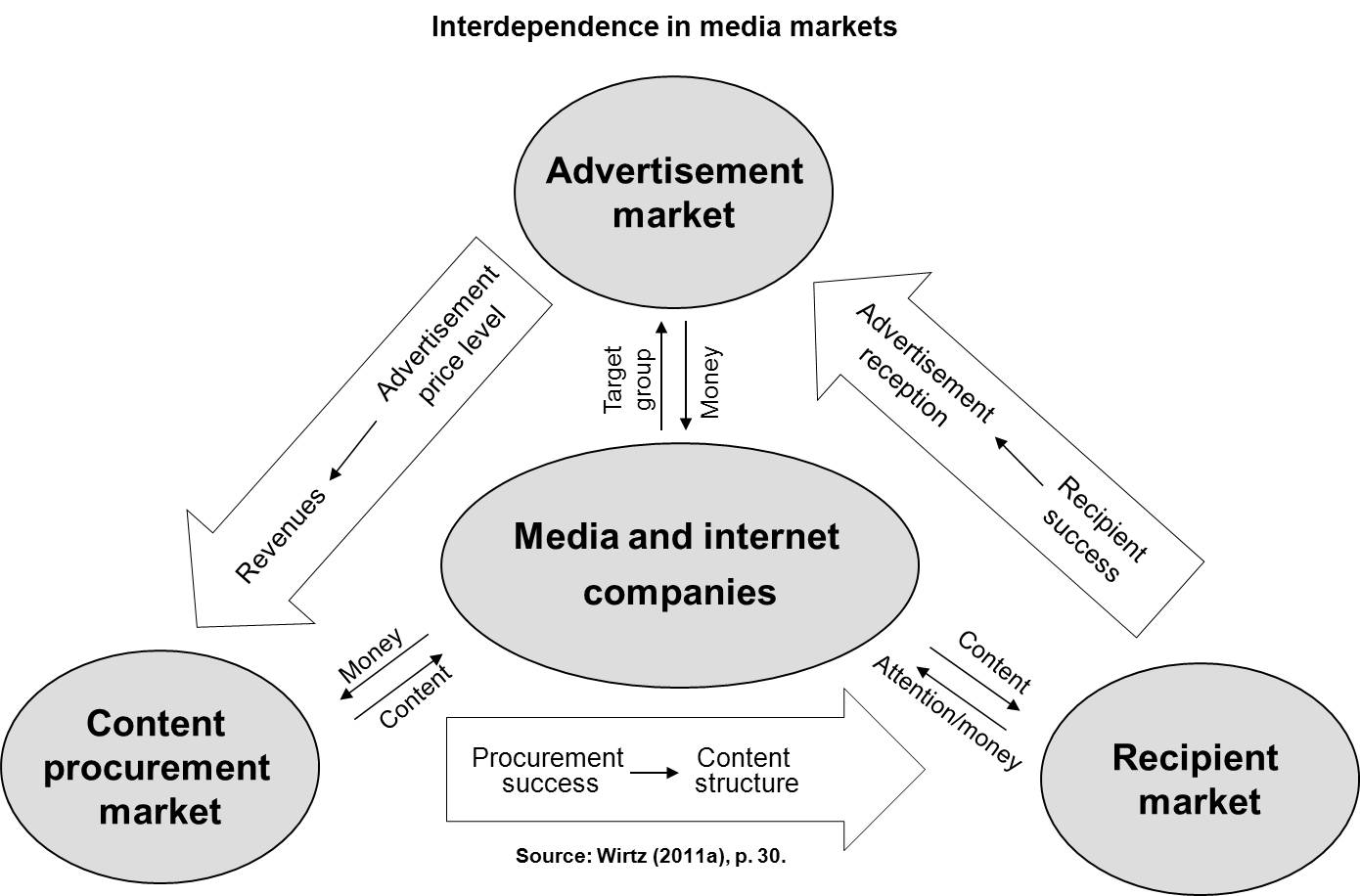
Image describes the inter-dependencies in media markets

Furthermore, there are geographic media markets. Media enterprises operate in specific geographic markets. Some firms operate in a national market while other companies, for example, local radio stations operate in a regional area. So the marketplace of a media enterprise consists of the product media markets (consumer market, advertisement market and procurement market) and the geographic media market.

== Value chain and core competencies ==
The value chain analysis by Michael Porter can be adapted for the analysis of value creation in media enterprises. Although the media sector is very heterogeneous and has different branch-specific features, the presented value chain of the media industry form the basic principles.

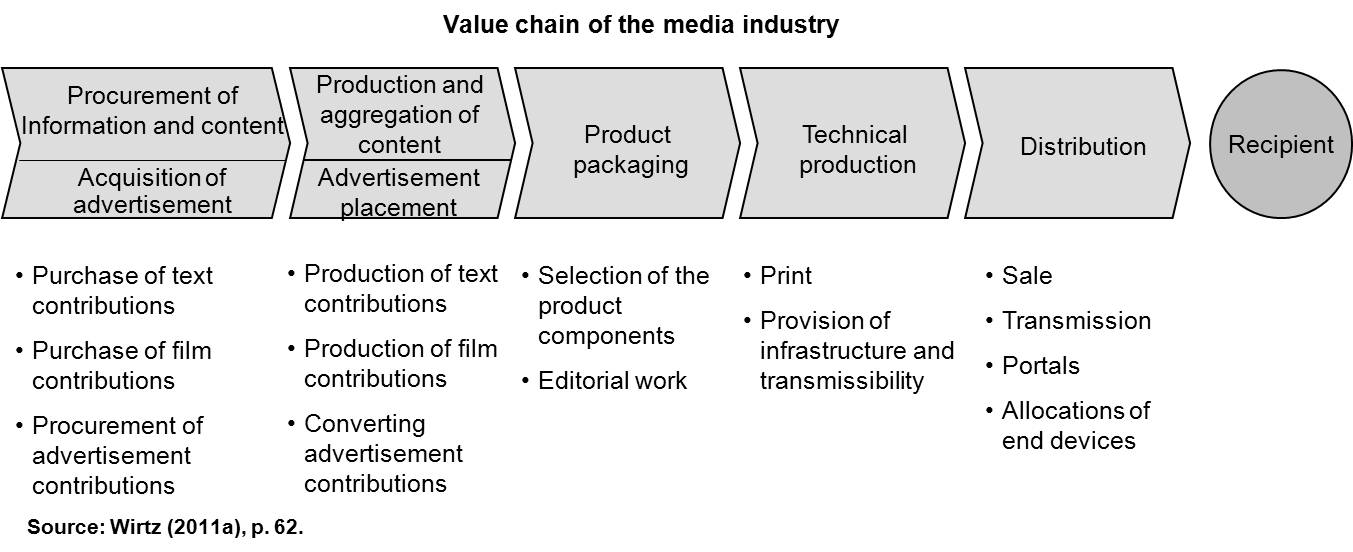
Image describing the value chain of the media industry.

As for business companies in general, for media enterprises their core assets and core competencies are decisive for the long-term success. Core competencies considerably contribute to the perceived customer benefit of a product and ensure the competitive advantage of an enterprise. Competencies which are crucial to successful media management can be classified as technical skills, human skills, conceptual skills, financial skills and marketing skills. Core competencies of media enterprises are, for example, an exceptional editorial ability or cross-media marketing competence. There are six subgroups of core competencies of media enterprises: content-sourcing competence, content-creation competence, product development competence, promotion competence, cross-media utilization competence and technology competence.

The content-sourcing competence means acquisition of high-quality information and/or entertainment content for content production. Especially the production of exclusive content leads to unique competitive advantage. Content-creation competence is one of the most important core competences in most media enterprises. Media enterprises with content-creation competences are, for example, especially good at realizing social trends and implementing them into their media products, making them highly attractive for the customers. The product development competence is the qualification for a product portfolio with a steady flow of revenues. In order to achieve this, media enterprises have to be able to develop promising media products and to assess their marketability. The promotion competence is specifically relevant for media products belonging to the film, book or music categories as these are individual products. Here a different promotion strategy than promotion of brand identity is needed. Achieving public attention and thus a better market position for media products constitutes the promotion competence. Media enterprises with cross-media utilization competences can provide content to the recipients in a timely manner, in the desired amount and via the right channel. Finally the technology competence refers to the employment of modern information and communication technology for the creation and marketing of content. Core competences form the foundation for the strategy formation process in media enterprises. For their future success, the media enterprises have to analyze the current competence basis and compare them with the required, strategically important, core competences derived from an external market analysis. There is a range of different influences on the media management decisions and actions that have to be included in the external market analysis. The influences are "the licensee, competing media, the government, the labor force, the labor unions, the public, and advertisers, economic activity, the industry, social factor and technology." In case some strategically important core competencies are not yet acquired by the media enterprise, they have to be developed.

== Business models ==
The concept of the business model is not used uniformly in the literature. Compared to the concept of the value chain, it is not limited to a physical production process. It also includes service processes. According to Timmers, "a business model is defined as the organization (or architecture) of product, service and information flows, and the sources of revenues and benefits for suppliers and customers." According to Wirtz, "a business model is a simplified and aggregated representation of the relevant activities of a company. It describes how marketable information, products and/or services are generated by means of a company's value-added component. In addition to the architecture of value creation, strategic as well as customer and market components are considered in order to realize the overriding objective of generating and preserving a competitive advantage." The business model as an integrated management tool consists of further partial models: the revenue model, the consumer model, the procurement model, the production of goods and services model, the service offer model and the distribution model. Because a business model can strongly vary depending on the type of business, it can best be described using a sample. In the following the business model of a book publishing house is presented. Book publishers are companies that have two components to consider: profit-orientation and a cultural dimension. They usually publish titles which are produced by external authors. The sales of books in the receiver markets are the main part of the revenue model of a book publisher. Other revenues can be generated in the rights and licensing markets. Further sources for revenues are utilization rights generating revenue outside of the printing sector. For example, successful manuscripts are used for film, television, magazines and merchandising.

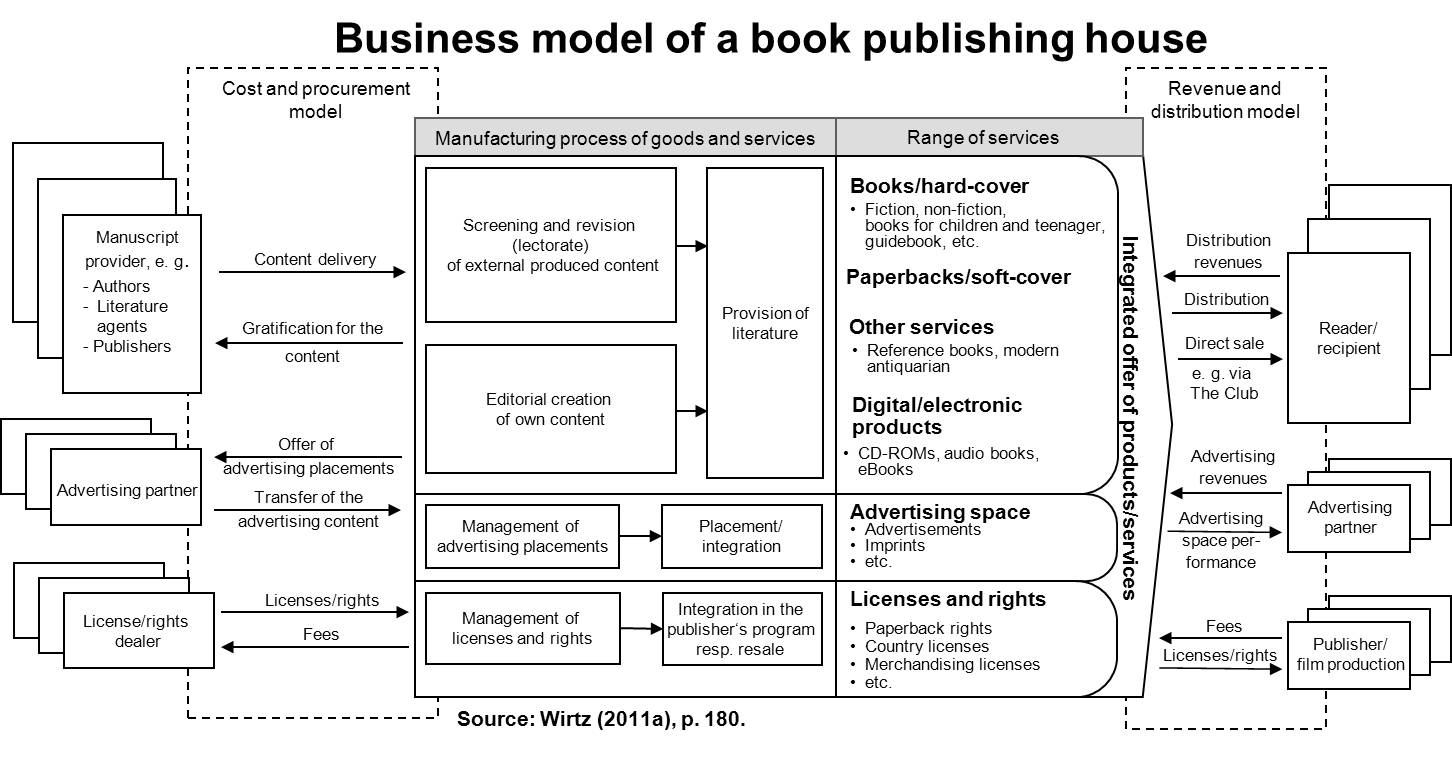
Image describing an example business model of a book publishing house.

For book publishers, production and distribution are the main focuses of the economic activity. Here the cost structure of manufacturing is of high importance. The amount of first copy costs in relation to total revenue is around 41%. Marketing costs are about 12% and administrative costs average 14%, with a profit margin of approximately 5%. The final product is delivered through existing distribution channels. With the rise of the internet, new distribution channels with direct delivery to book consumers have been developed. The business model of a book publishing house is shown in the graphic.
