= USS Scorpion (SSN-589) =

Skipjack-class nuclear-powered submarine

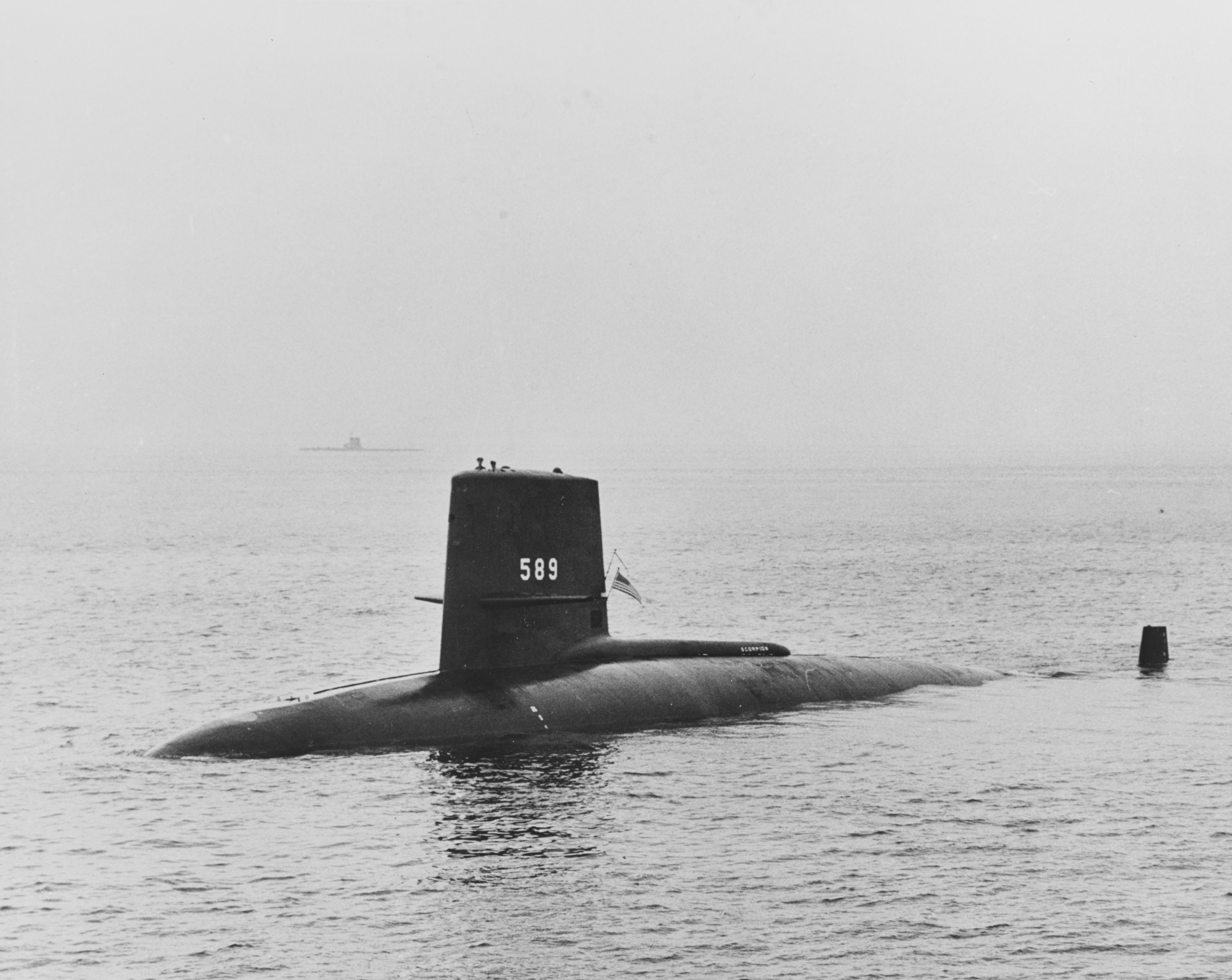
- USS Scorpion, 22 August 1960, off New London, Connecticut

History

United States
- Name: Scorpion
- Ordered: 31 January 1957
- Builder: General Dynamics Electric Boat
- Laid down: 20 August 1958
- Launched: 29 December 1959
- Commissioned: 29 July 1960
- Stricken: 30 June 1968
- Nickname(s): USS Scrapiron
- Fate: Lost with all 99 crew on 22 May 1968; cause of sinking unknown
- Status: Located on the seabed of the Atlantic Ocean, 32°55′N 33°09′W, in 3,000 m (9,800 ft) of water, 740 km (400 nmi) southwest of the Azores
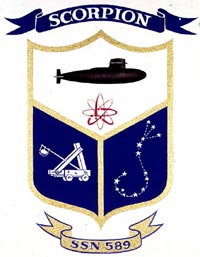
- Badge

General characteristics
- Class & type: Skipjack-class submarine
- Displacement: 2,880 long tons (2,930 t) light; 3,075 long tons (3,124 t) full; 195 long tons (198 t) deadweight
- Length: 251 ft 8 in (76.71 m)
- Beam: 31 ft 7.75 in (9.6457 m)
- Draft: 9.1 m (29 ft 10 in)
- Propulsion: S5W reactor
- Complement: 8 officers, 75 enlisted
- Armament: 6 × 21 in (533 mm) torpedo tubes; 2 × Mark 45 torpedoes

USS Scorpion (SSN-589) was a Skipjack-class nuclear-powered submarine that served in the United States Navy, the sixth vessel and second submarine to carry that name.

Scorpion imploded and sank on 22 May 1968. She is one of two nuclear submarines that the U.S. Navy has lost, the other being USS Thresher. She was one of the four submarine disappearances in 1968, the others being the Israeli submarine INS Dakar, the French submarine Minerve, and the Soviet submarine K-129.

The wreckage of Scorpion remains in the North Atlantic Ocean with all of her armaments and her nuclear reactor.

== Service ==
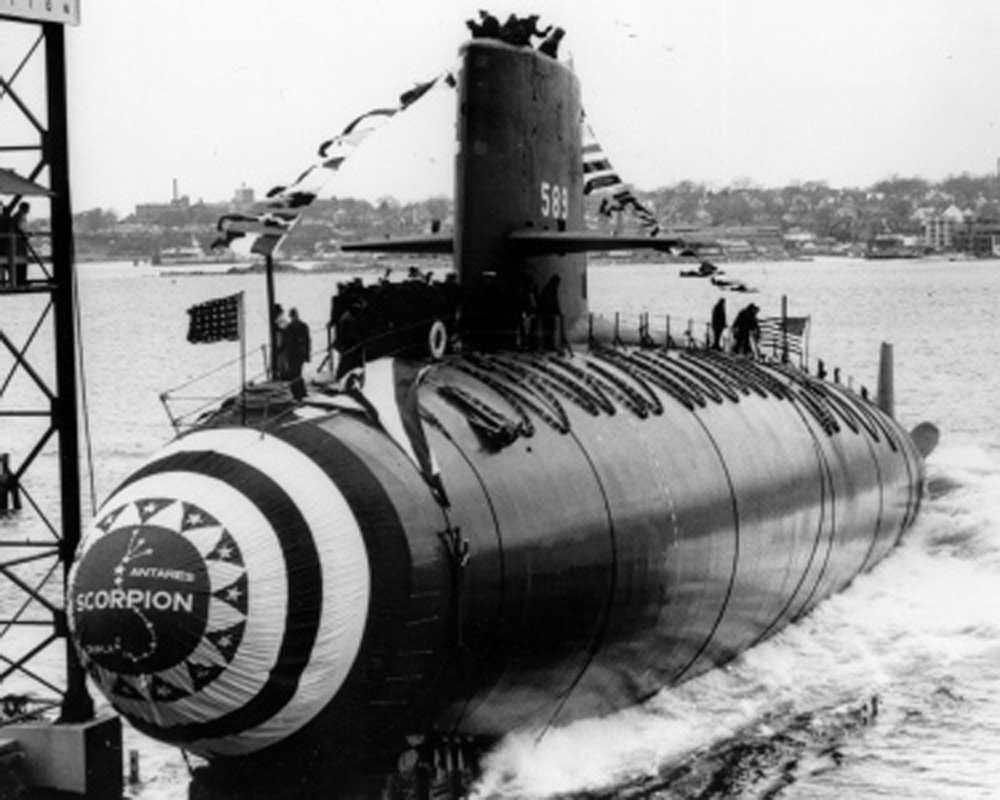
USS Scorpion slides down the ways at the launch in Groton, Connecticut, on 19 December 1959

Scorpion's keel was laid down 20 August 1958 by General Dynamics Electric Boat in Groton, Connecticut. She was launched 19 December 1959, sponsored by Elizabeth S. Morrison, the daughter of Lieutenant Commander Maximilian Gmelich Schmidt, the final commander of the similarly-named World War II-era USS Scorpion (SS-278) which had been lost with all hands in 1944. The newer Scorpion was commissioned 29 July 1960, with Commander Norman B. Bessac in command. (Note: See USS George Washington for information on how that submarine had originally been laid down with the name and hull number, USS Scorpion SSN-589, intended to be an attack submarine.)

=== Service: 1960–1967 ===
Assigned to Submarine Squadron 6, Division 62, Scorpion departed New London, Connecticut, on 24 August for a two-month European deployment. During that time, she participated in exercises with 6th Fleet units and NATO-member navies. After returning to New England in late October, she trained along the Eastern Seaboard until May 1961. On 9 August 1961, she returned to New London, moving to Norfolk, Virginia, a month later. In 1962, she earned a Navy Unit Commendation.

Norfolk was Scorpion's homeport for the remainder of her career, and she specialized in developing nuclear submarine warfare tactics. Varying roles from hunter to hunted, she participated in exercises along the Atlantic Coast, and in Bermuda and Puerto Rico operating areas. From June 1963 to May 1964, she underwent an overhaul at Charleston. She resumed duty in late spring, but regular duties were again interrupted from 4 August to 8 October for a transatlantic patrol. In the spring of 1965, she conducted a similar patrol in European waters.

In 1966, she deployed for special operations. After completing those assignments, her commanding officer received a Navy Commendation Medal for outstanding leadership, foresight, and professional skill. Other Scorpion officers and crewmen were also cited for meritorious achievement. Scorpion is reputed to have entered an inland Russian sea during a "Northern Run" in 1966, where the crew filmed a Soviet missile launch through her periscope before fleeing from Soviet Navy ships.

=== Overhaul: 1967 ===
On 1 February 1967, Scorpion entered Norfolk Naval Shipyard for a refueling overhaul. Instead of a much-needed complete overhaul, though, she received only emergency repairs to get quickly back on duty. The preferred SUBSAFE program required increased submarine overhaul times, from 9 to 36 months. SUBSAFE required intensive vetting of submarine component quality, coupled with various improvements and intensified structural inspections – particularly of hull welding, using ultrasonic testing.

Cold War pressures had prompted U.S. Submarine Force Atlantic (SUBLANT) officers to cut corners. The last overhaul of the Scorpion cost one-seventh of those performed on other nuclear submarines at the same time. This was the result of concerns about the "high percentage of time offline" for nuclear attack submarines, estimated at 40% of total available duty time.

Scorpion's original "full overhaul" was reduced in scope. Long-overdue SUBSAFE work, such as a new central valve control system, was not performed. Crucially, her emergency system was not corrected for the same problems that destroyed Thresher. While Charleston Naval Shipyard claimed the emergency main ballast tank blow (EMBT) system worked as-is, SUBLANT claimed it did not, and their EMBT was "tagged out" (listed as unusable). Perceived problems with overhaul duration led to a delay on all SUBSAFE work in 1967.

Chief of Naval Operations Admiral David Lamar McDonald approved Scorpion's reduced overhaul on 17 June 1966. On 20 July, McDonald deferred SUBSAFE extensions, otherwise deemed essential since 1963.

=== Service: 1967–1968 ===
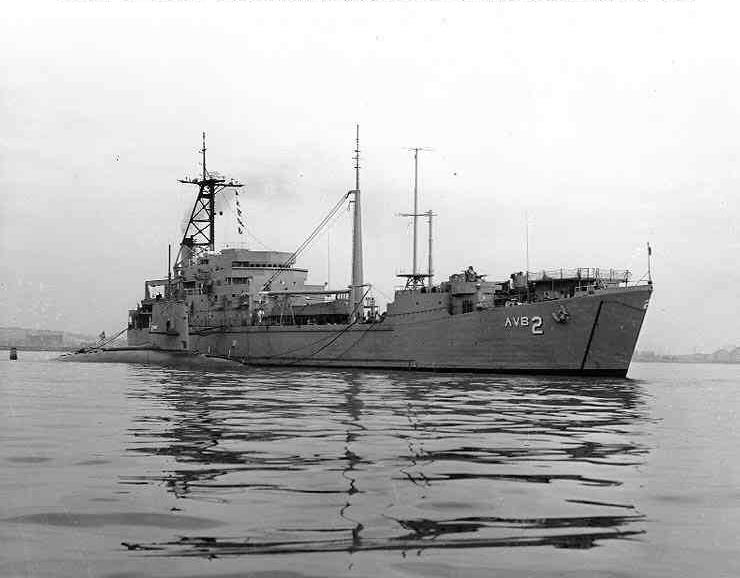
Tallahatchie County with Scorpion alongside, outside Claywall Harbor, Naples, Italy, in April 1968 (shortly before Scorpion departed on her last voyage). This is one of the last photographs taken of Scorpion before her loss.

In late October 1967, Scorpion started refresher training and weapons-system acceptance tests, and was given a new commanding officer, Francis Slattery. Following type training out of Norfolk, Virginia, she got underway on 15 February 1968 for a Mediterranean Sea deployment. She operated with the 6th Fleet into May and then headed west for home.

Scorpion suffered several mechanical malfunctions, including a chronic problem with freon leakage from refrigeration systems. An electrical fire occurred in an escape trunk when a water leak shorted out a shore power connection. No evidence was found that Scorpion's speed was restricted in May 1968, although it was conservatively observing a depth limitation of 500 feet (150 m), due to the incomplete implementation of planned post-Thresher safety checks and modifications.

After departing the Mediterranean on 16 May, Scorpion dropped two men at Naval Station Rota in Spain, one for a family emergency and one for health reasons. Some U.S. ballistic missile submarines (SSBNs) operated from the U.S. naval base Rota; USS Scorpion is thought to have provided noise cover for USS John C. Calhoun when they both departed to the Atlantic. Along with Soviet intelligence trawlers, Soviet fast nuclear attack submarines were attempting to detect and follow the U.S. submarines leaving Rota; in this case, two fast 32-knot November-class hunter-killer subs.

Scorpion was then detailed to observe Soviet naval activities in the Atlantic in the vicinity of the Azores. An Echo II-class submarine was operating with this Soviet task force, as well as a Russian guided-missile destroyer. Having observed and listened to the Soviet units, Scorpion prepared to head back to Naval Station Norfolk.

== Disappearance: May 1968 ==
Scorpion attempted to send radio traffic to Naval Station Rota for an unusually long period beginning shortly before midnight on 20 May and ending after midnight on 21 May, but was only able to reach a Navy communications station in Nea Makri, Greece, which forwarded the messages to COMSUBLANT. Lt. John Roberts was handed Commander Slattery's last message that he was closing on the Soviet submarine K-135 and research group, running at a steady 15 kn (28 km/h) at a depth of 350 ft (110 m) "to begin surveillance of the Soviets." Scorpion was expected to arrive at her homeport of Norfolk, Virginia, on 27 May at 1300 local time. After she was overdue for several hours, the Atlantic fleet launched a sea and air search during the peak search period from 28 to 30 May involving as many as 55 ships and 35 search aircraft. A brief radio message including Scorpion's codename Brandywine was received by several search parties on the evening of 29 May. The source could not be identified in the search area derived from the bearings of the radio message.

=== Search: 1968 ===
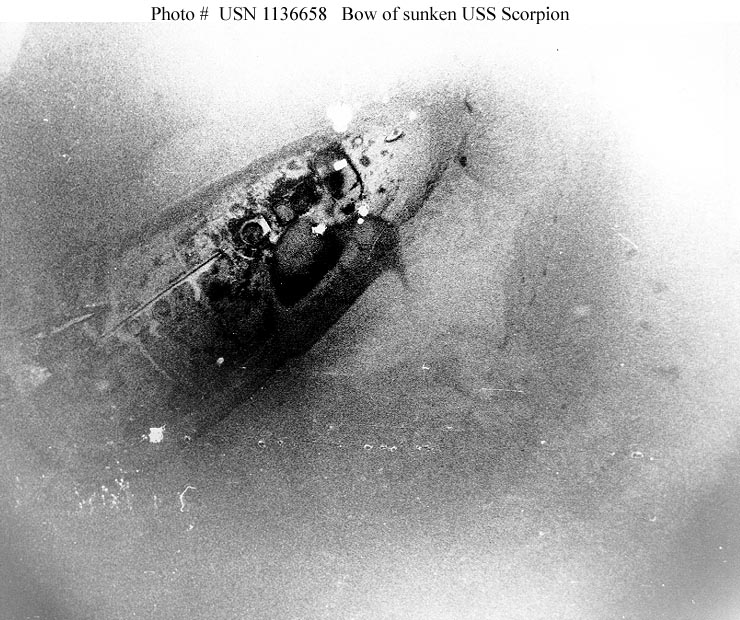
1968 U.S. Navy photo of the bow section of Scorpion, by the crew of bathyscaphe Trieste II

The Navy suspected possible failure and launched a search. Scorpion and her crew were declared "presumed lost" on 5 June. Her name was struck from the Naval Vessel Register on 30 June. The search continued with a team of mathematical consultants led by John Piña Craven, the chief scientist of the Navy's Special Projects Division. They employed the methods of Bayesian search theory, initially developed during the search for a hydrogen bomb lost off the coast of Palomares, Spain, in January 1966 in the Palomares B-52 crash.

Some reports indicate that a large and secret search was launched three days before Scorpion was expected back from patrol. This and other declassified information led to speculation that the Navy knew of Scorpion's destruction before the public search was launched.

At the end of October 1968, the Navy's oceanographic research ship Mizar located sections of the hull of Scorpion on the seabed, about 400 nmi (740 km) southwest of the Azores under more than 9,800 ft (3,000 m) of water. This was after the Navy had released sound tapes from its underwater SOSUS listening system, which contained the sounds of the destruction of Scorpion. The court of inquiry was subsequently reconvened, and other vessels, including the bathyscaphe Trieste II, were dispatched to the scene to collect pictures and other data.

Craven received much credit for locating the wreckage of Scorpion, although Gordon Hamilton was instrumental in defining a compact "search box" wherein the wreck was ultimately found. He was an acoustics expert who pioneered the use of hydroacoustics to pinpoint Polaris missile splashdown locations, and he had established a listening station in the Canary Islands, which obtained a clear signal of the vessel's pressure hull imploding as it passed crush depth. Naval Research Laboratory scientist Chester Buchanan used a towed camera sled of his own design aboard Mizar and finally located Scorpion.

=== Observed damage ===
Skipjack-class submarine drawing: 1. Sonar arrays; 2. Torpedo room; 3. Operations compartment; 4. Reactor compartment; 5. Auxiliary machinery space; 6. Engine room

The bow of Scorpion appears to have skidded upon impact with the globigerina ooze on the sea floor, digging a sizable trench. The sail had been dislodged, as the hull of the operations compartment upon which it perched disintegrated, and was lying on its port side. One of Scorpion's running lights was in the open position, as if it had been on the surface at the time of the mishap, although it may have been left in the open position during the vessel's recent nighttime stop at Rota. One Trieste II pilot who dived on Scorpion said that the shock of the implosion might have knocked the light into the open position.

The secondary Navy investigation – using extensive photographic, video, and eyewitness inspections of the wreckage in 1969 – suggested that Scorpion's hull imploded as it sank below crush depth. The Structural Analysis Group, which included Naval Ship Systems Command's Submarine Structures director Peter Palermo, plainly saw that the torpedo room was intact, though pinched by excessive sea pressure. The operations compartment collapsed at frame 33, this being the king frame of the hull, reaching its structural limit first. The conical/cylindrical transition piece at frame 67 followed instantly. The boat was broken in two by massive hydrostatic pressure at an estimated depth of 1,530 ft (470 m). The operations compartment was largely obliterated by sea pressure, and the engine room had telescoped 50 ft (15 m) forward into the hull due to collapse pressure, when the cone-to-cylinder transition junction failed between the auxiliary machine space and the engine room.

The only damage to the torpedo room compartment was the missing hatch of the forward escape trunk. Palermo pointed out that this would have occurred when water pressure entered the torpedo room at the moment of implosion.

The sail was ripped off, as the hull beneath it folded inward. The propulsion shaft came out of the boat; the engineering section had collapsed inward in a telescoping fashion. The broken boat fell another 9,000 ft (2,700 m) to the ocean floor.

Photos taken in 1986 by Alvin, released by the Navy in 2012, show the broken inboard end of the propulsion shaft.

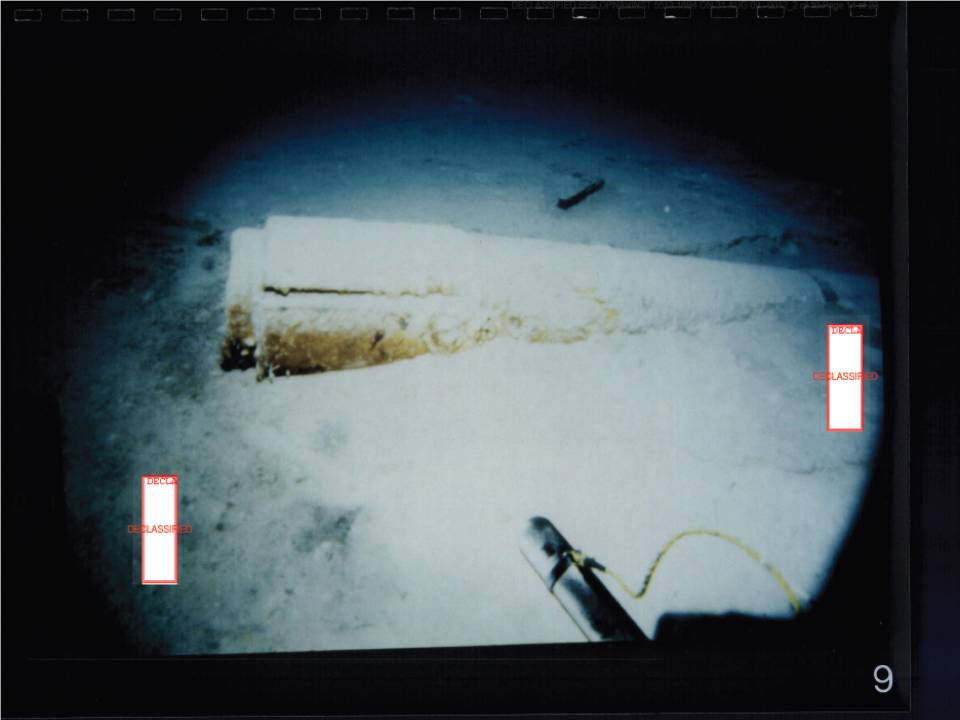
Broken inboard end of Scorpion shaft lying on ocean bottom

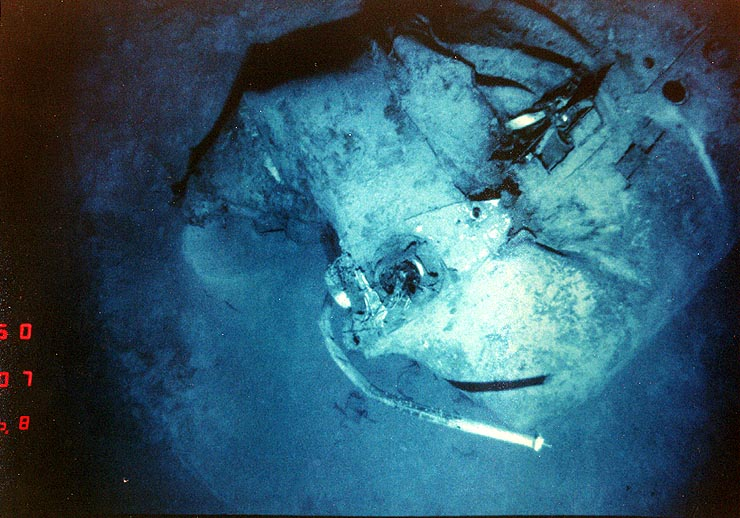
Bow section of the Scorpion

== Navy investigations ==
=== Court of inquiry report: 1968 ===
Shortly after her sinking, the Navy assembled a court of inquiry to investigate the incident and to publish a report regarding the likely causes. The court was presided over by Vice Admiral Bernard L. Austin, who had presided over the inquiry into the loss of Thresher. The report's findings were first made public on 31 January 1969. While ruling out sabotage, the report said: "The certain cause of the loss of the Scorpion cannot be ascertained from evidence now available."

In 1984, the Norfolk Virginian-Pilot and The Ledger-Star obtained documents related to the inquiry, and reported the disaster was likely caused by a torpedo that exploded when the crew tried to disarm it. The U.S. Navy declassified many of the inquiry's documents in 1993.

=== Naval Ordnance Laboratory report: 1970 ===
An extensive, year-long analysis of Gordon Hamilton's hydroacoustic signals of the submarine's demise was conducted by Robert Price, Ermine Christian, and Peter Sherman of the Naval Ordnance Laboratory (NOL). All three physicists were experts on undersea explosions, their sound signatures, and their destructive effects. Price was also an open critic of Craven. Their opinion, presented to the Navy as part of the phase II investigation, was that the death noises likely occurred at 2,000 ft (610 m) when the hull failed. Fragments then continued in a free fall for another 9,000 ft (2,700 m). This appears to differ from conclusions drawn by Craven and Hamilton, who pursued an independent set of experiments as part of the same phase II probe, demonstrating that alternate interpretations of the hydroacoustic signals were possibly based on the submarine's depth at the time it was stricken and other operational conditions.

The Structural Analysis Group (SAG) concluded that an explosive event was unlikely and was highly dismissive of Craven and Hamilton's tests. The SAG physicists argued that the absence of a bubble pulse, which invariably occurs in an underwater explosion, is absolute evidence that no torpedo explosion occurred outside or inside the hull. Craven had attempted to prove that Scorpion's hull could "swallow" the bubble pulse of a torpedo detonation by having Gordon Hamilton detonate small charges next to air-filled steel containers.

The 1970 Naval Ordnance Laboratory "Letter", the acoustics study of Scorpion destruction sounds by Price and Christian, was a supporting study within the SAG report. In its conclusions and recommendations section, the NOL acoustic study states: "The first SCORPION acoustic event was not caused by a large explosion, either internal or external to the hull. The probable depth of occurrence ... and the spectral characteristics of the signal support this. In fact, it is very unlikely that any of the Scorpion acoustic events were caused by explosions."

The NOL based many of its findings on an extensive acoustic analysis of the torpedoing and sinking of the decommissioned submarine Sterlet in the Pacific in early 1969, seeking to compare its acoustic signals to those generated by Scorpion. Price found the Navy's scheduled sinking of Sterlet fortunate. Nonetheless, Sterlet was a small World War II-era diesel-electric submarine of a vastly different design and construction from Scorpion with regard to its pressure hull and other characteristics. Its sinking resulted in three identifiable acoustic signals, as compared to Scorpion's 15.

The NOL acoustics study provided a highly debated explanation as to how Scorpion may have reached its crush depth by anecdotally referring to the near-loss incident of the diesel submarine Chopper in January 1969, when a power problem caused her to sink almost to crush depth, before surfacing.

In the same May 2003 N77 letter excerpted above (see 1. with regard to the Navy's view of a forward explosion), however, the following statement appears to dismiss the NOL theory, and again unequivocally point the finger toward an explosion forward:

The Navy has extensively investigated the loss of Scorpion through the initial court of inquiry and the 1970 and 1987 reviews by the Structural Analysis Group. Nothing in those investigations caused the Navy to change its conclusion that an unexplained catastrophic event occurred.

=== Wreck site ===
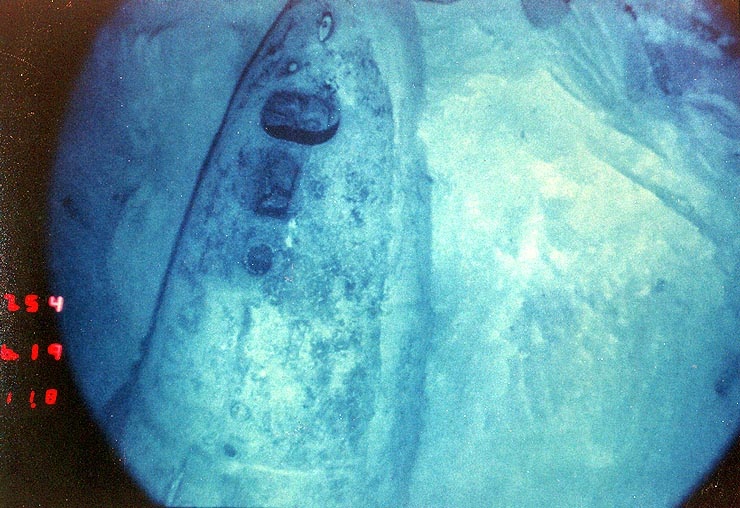
The bow section of the Scorpion contains two nuclear Mark 45 antisubmarine torpedoes

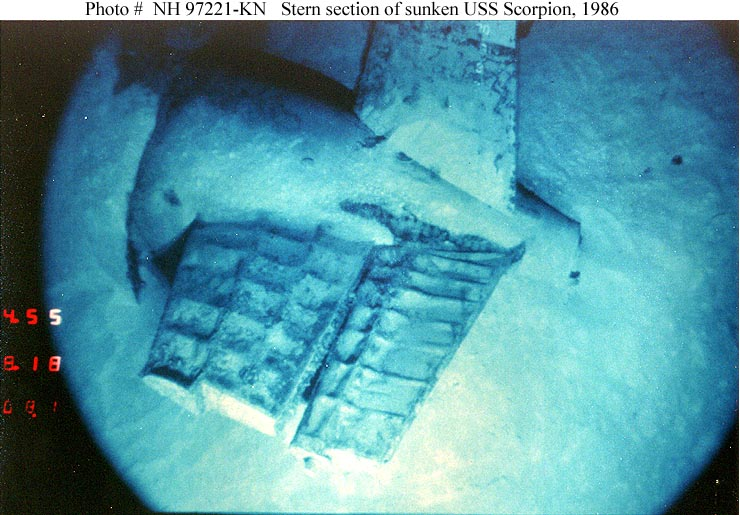
A 1985 image of the submarine's fractured stern section

The remains of Scorpion rest on a sandy seabed at 32°54.9′N 33°08.89′W in the north Atlantic Ocean. The wreck lies at a depth of 9,800 ft (3,000 m) about 400 nmi (740 km) southwest of the Azores on the eastern edge of the Sargasso Sea.

The U.S. Navy periodically revisits the site to determine whether wreckage has been disturbed and to test for the release of any fissile materials from the submarine's nuclear reactor or two nuclear weapons. Except for a few photographs taken by deep-water submersibles in 1968 and 1985, the U.S. Navy has never made public any physical surveys it has conducted on the wreck. The last photos were taken by Robert Ballard and a team of oceanographers from Woods Hole using the submersible Alvin in 1985. The U.S. Navy secretly lent Ballard the submersible to visit the wreck sites of Thresher and Scorpion. In exchange for his work, the U.S. Navy then allowed Ballard, a USNR officer, to use the same submersible to search for RMS Titanic, with the search for the latter being the cover story to avoid alerting the Russians to the effort to find the missing submarines.

=== Call for inquiry: 2012 ===
In November 2012, the U.S. Submarine Veterans, an organization with over 13,800 members, asked the U.S. Navy to reopen the investigation on the sinking of USS Scorpion. The Navy rejected the request. A private group including family members of the lost submariners stated they would investigate the wreckage on their own, since it was located in international waters.

== Theories about the loss ==
=== Hydrogen explosion during battery charge ===
Retired acoustics expert Bruce Rule, a long-time analyst for the Integrated Undersea Surveillance System (IUSS), wrote that a hydrogen explosion sank Scorpion.

Dave Oliver, a retired rear admiral who served in both diesel boats and nuclear submarines, wrote in his book Against the Tide that Scorpion was lost as a result of hydrogen build-up due to changes in the ventilation lineup while proceeding to periscope depth. After analysis of the ship's battery cells, this is the leading theory for the loss of Scorpion. This is consistent with two small explosions aboard the submarine, a half-second apart, that were picked up by hydrophones.

=== Accidental activation of torpedo ===
The classified version of the U.S. Navy's court of inquiry's report, released in 1993, listed accidents involving the Mark 37 torpedo as three of the most probable causes for the loss of submarine, including a hot-running torpedo, an accidentally or deliberately launched weapon, or the inadvertent activation of a torpedo by stray voltage. The acoustic homing torpedo, in a fully ready condition and lacking a propeller guard, is theorized by some to have started running within the tube. Released from the tube, the torpedo then somehow became fully armed and engaged its nearest target: Scorpion herself.

=== Explosion of torpedo inside sub ===
A later theory was that a fire in the torpedo room had caused a torpedo to explode in the tube. The book Blind Man's Bluff documents findings and investigation by John Craven, who was the chief scientist of the Navy's Special Projects Office, which had management responsibility for the design, development, construction, operational test and evaluation, and maintenance of the UGM-27 Polaris fleet missile system. Craven surmised that a faulty torpedo battery had overheated. The Mark 46 silver–zinc battery used in the Mark 37 torpedo had a tendency to overheat, and in extreme cases could cause a fire sufficient to cause a low-order detonation of the warhead. If such a detonation had occurred, it may have opened the boat's large torpedo-loading hatch and caused Scorpion to flood and sink. However, while Mark 46 batteries have been known to generate so much heat that the torpedo casings blistered, none are known to have damaged a boat or caused an explosion.

Craven mentions that he did not work on the Mark 37 torpedo's propulsion system and became aware of the possibility of a battery explosion only 20 years after the loss of Scorpion. In his book The Silent War, he recounts a simulation run by former Scorpion executive officer Lieutenant Commander Robert Fountain Jr. Fountain was told he was headed home at 18 knots (33 km/h) at a depth of his choice, then there was an alarm of "hot-running torpedo". Fountain responded with "right full rudder", a quick turn that would activate a safety device and keep the torpedo from arming. Then, an explosion in the torpedo room occurred. Fountain ordered emergency procedures to surface the boat, Craven wrote, "but instead, she continued to plummet, reaching collapse depth and imploding in 90 seconds – one second shy of the acoustic record of the actual event."

Craven had long believed Scorpion was struck by her own torpedo, but revised his views during the mid-1990s, when he learned that engineers testing Mark 46 batteries at Keyport, Washington, just before the disaster, said the batteries leaked electrolyte and sometimes burned while outside their casings during lifetime shock, heat, and cold testing. Although the manufacturer was accused of building bad batteries, it later proved its batteries were no more prone to failure than those made by other manufacturers.

=== Intentional firing of defective torpedo ===
Twenty years later, Craven learned that the boat could have been destroyed by a "hot-running torpedo." Other subs in the fleet had replaced their defective torpedo batteries, but the Navy wanted Scorpion to complete its mission first. If Scorpion had fired a defective torpedo, it could have sought out a target and turned back to strike the sub that launched it.

=== Structural damage ===
Photographs of the wreck show the submarine's detached shaft and propeller, which is missing a rotor blade. Some experienced U.S. submariners attribute the loss to flooding caused by the detached shaft. Given that antisubmarine torpedoes were designed to seek the sound of the cavitation of the target's propeller, this could be damage caused by such a weapon.

=== Malfunction of trash disposal unit ===
During the 1968 inquiry, Vice Admiral Arnold F. Shade testified that he believed that a malfunction of the trash disposal unit (TDU) caused the disaster. Shade theorized that the boat was flooded when the TDU was operated at periscope depth and that other subsequent failures of material or personnel while dealing with the TDU-induced flooding led to the submarine's demise.

=== Soviet attack ===
The book All Hands Down by Kenneth Sewell and Jerome Preisler (Simon and Schuster, 2008) concludes that Scorpion was destroyed while en route to gather intelligence on a Soviet naval group conducting operations in the Atlantic.

Ed Offley's book Scorpion Down argues Scorpion was sunk by a Soviet submarine during a standoff that started days before 22 May. Offley also cites that it occurred roughly at the time of the submarine's intelligence-gathering mission, for which she was redirected from her original heading for home. According to Offley, the Soviet flotilla had just been harassed by USS Haddo.

Both All Hands Down and Scorpion Down point toward involvement by the KGB spy ring led by John Anthony Walker in the heart of the U.S. Navy's communications, stating that it could have known that Scorpion was coming to investigate the Soviet flotilla. According to this theory, both navies agreed to hide the truth about both the USS Scorpion and K-129 incidents. Several USN and RN submarines collided with Soviet Echo-class subs in Russian and British waters in this period, showing greatly enhanced aggression in Soviet Navy sub operations in 1968. The navy Minister in the British Labour government noted 11 such deliberate collisions. Commander Roger Lane Nott, Royal Navy commander of HMS Splendid during the 1982 Falklands War, stated that a Soviet submarine entered the Firth of Clyde channel in Scotland in 1972, and Conqueror was ordered to "chase it out". The Soviets realized that they were being followed, and "a very aggressive Soviet captain turned his submarine and drove her straight at HMS Conqueror. It had been an extremely close call."

According to a translated article from Pravda, Moscow never issued a "fire" command during the Cold War. This is disputed by Royal Navy officers: "there had been other occasions when harassed Russians had fired torpedoes to scare off trails".

=== U.S. Navy conclusions ===
The U.S. Navy's various investigations into the loss of Scorpion are inconclusive. While the court of inquiry never endorsed Craven's torpedo theory, its "findings of facts" released in 1993 carried it at the head of a list of possible explanations.

The first cataclysmic event was of such magnitude that the only possible conclusion is that a cataclysmic event (explosion) occurred resulting in uncontrolled flooding (most likely the forward compartments).

== Books ==
=== Blind Man's Bluff ===
In 1998, two New York Times reporters published Blind Man's Bluff: The Untold Story of American Submarine Espionage discussing espionage during the Cold War. One lengthy chapter deals extensively with Scorpion and her loss. The authors report that concerns were raised in 1967 and 1968 about the Mk 37 torpedo carried aboard Scorpion—before Scorpion left Norfolk for her final mission. The concerns focused on the battery powering the torpedoes. The battery had a thin metal-foil barrier separating two types of volatile chemicals. The chemicals generated heat and electricity when mixed slowly and in controlled conditions, powering the torpedo's motor, but vibrations normally experienced on a nuclear submarine were found to break down the foil barrier over time, allowing the chemicals to interact violently. The heat generated could have caused the torpedo to explode. The authors highlight information discovered during the investigation which contradicts the investigation's findings. They cite a hot-running torpedo incident on the USS Sargo (SSN-583) prior to the loss of Scorpion, although Sargo was moored at the time and not lost.

=== Red Star Rogue ===
In 2005, the book Red Star Rogue: The Untold Story of a Soviet Submarine's Nuclear Strike Attempt on the U.S., by former American submariner Kenneth Sewell in collaboration with journalist Clint Richmond, claimed that Soviet submarine K-129 was sunk 300 nmi (560 km) northwest of Oahu on 7 March 1968 while attempting to launch her three ballistic missiles, in a rogue attempt to destroy Pearl Harbor.

Sewell claims that the sinking of Scorpion was caused by a retaliatory strike for the sinking of K-129, which the Soviets had attributed to a collision with USS Swordfish.

In 1995, when Peter Huchthausen began work on a book about the Soviet underwater fleet, he interviewed former Soviet Admiral Victor Dygalo, who stated that the true history of K-129 has not been revealed because of the informal agreement between the two countries' senior naval commands. The purpose of that secrecy, he alleged, is to stop any further research into the losses of either Scorpion or K-129. Huchthausen states that Dygalo told him to "forget about ever resolving these sad issues for the surviving families."

=== All Hands Down ===
All Hands Down was written by Kenneth R. Sewell, a nuclear engineer and a U.S. Navy veteran who spent five years aboard Parche, a fast attack submarine. It attempts to link the sinking of Scorpion with the Pueblo incident, the John Anthony Walker spy ring, and Cold War Soviet aggression. The thesis of this book is that action off the Canary Islands was the direct cause of the sinking. The author purports that this is supported by motives in the Soviet Navy following the sinking of K-129, which caused the Russian Navy to trap a U.S. submarine. The bait for this trap would be strange military operations and furtive naval manoeuvres in the Atlantic, accompanied by countermeasures that would seemingly be defeated only by the deployment of a nuclear submarine. With information from spying by Walker, the position and arrival time of Scorpion was known by the Russians, and its sinking followed the springing of the trap. The book claims Scorpion was sunk by a Ka-25 helicopter equipped with antisubmarine torpedoes, which took off from one ship and landed on a different one. This was so that no one, other than the aircrew of the helicopter, would notice one torpedo missing.

The book then purports a cover-up by American and Soviet officials, to avoid public outrage and an increase in Cold War tension.

=== Scorpion Down ===
Ed Offley, a reporter on military affairs, has closely followed developments in information concerning the sinking of the Scorpion. His most recent article on the subject is "Buried at Sea" published in the Winter 2008 issue of the Quarterly Journal of Military History. This article summarizes the facts in the case as presented in his 2007 book Scorpion Down: Sunk by the Soviets, Buried by the Pentagon: The Untold Story of the USS Scorpion. In the book, Offley, gathering decades of his own research, hypothesizes that Scorpion was sunk by the Soviets, possibly in retaliation for the loss of K-129 earlier that year. The book paints a picture of increasing Soviet anger at U.S. Navy provocations — specifically, close-in monitoring of Soviet naval operations by almost every U.S. nuclear submarine. Around the same time, the Soviet intelligence community scored a huge boon in receiving the mechanical cryptologic devices (TSAC/KW- 7) from Pueblo. These machines, combined with daily crypto keys from the Walker spy ring, likely allowed the Soviets to monitor U.S. Navy ship dispositions and communications.

Offley contends that the Scorpion was tracked by several Soviet Navy assets from the Mediterranean to its final operational area south of the Azores, where it was then sunk by a Soviet torpedo. He claims the U.S. Navy was aware of the loss of the Scorpion on 21 May 1968, and by the night of 22 May 68, deep concern had arisen over the Scorpion after not receiving the required 24-hr, four-word communication check required on operational duty, in the SUBCOMLANT communication center at Norfolk on the evidence of two 2nd-class radiomen on the deck that night, among junior USN officers, and the unit supervisor, Warrant Officer J. Walker, confirmed to interested staff that no check transmission from Scorpion was received that night, and by the morning of 23 May 1968, the SUBCOMLANT center was full of admirals and a Marine general, and no doubt interested about the loss of Scorpion, and the US government and Navy were engaged in a massive cover-up, within days destroying much of the sound and communication data at SOSUS ground stations in the U.S. and Europe, and delaying any public indication of the loss until the ship's scheduled arrival at Norfolk, Virginia, five days later, partly to disguise the fact that U.S. nuclear subs were in constant or frequent communication with U.S. naval communication bases and that the subsequent search for the Scorpion was a five-month-long deception to pretend they had no idea of the hull's location.

The oral testimony Offley relied upon are recollections of surviving SOSUS recordings documenting torpedo sounds, evasion sounds, an explosion, and eventually the sounds of implosions as Scorpion plunged past crush depth.

=== Against the Tide: Rickover's Leadership Principles and the Rise of the Nuclear Navy ===
In a section from this 2014 book titled "The Danger of Culture", retired U.S. Navy Rear Admiral Dave Oliver offers the theory based on his own experiences that a hydrogen explosion, either during or immediately following a battery charge, possibly destroyed USS Scorpion and killed her crew. The proximate cause in that scenario would have been the procedural carryover from diesel-boat days wherein the boat was effectively rigged for collision—with subsequent changes in ventilation flow and watertight condition—before proceeding to periscope depth by way of setting "Condition Baker". Oliver had personally witnessed dangerously high hydrogen level spikes under such conditions aboard a nuclear submarine, specifically while going to periscope depth and setting Condition Baker during a battery charge. Diesel boats, in contrast, were not capable of doing a battery charge while deeply submerged, but were instead dealing with the risk of collision while on antisurface-ship operations when proceeding to periscope depth while in or near shipping lanes. In regard to NAVSEA responsibility, he further states: "I always felt that the investigators closed their eyes to the most likely cause because they did not want to acknowledge their own involvement in this tragedy. I had forwarded my letter about Condition Baker via some of the same people responsible for the Scorpion investigation."

== In popular culture ==
Before its destruction, USS Scorpion was featured in the 1957 apocalyptic novel On the Beach as one of the last surviving US Navy submarines after a global thermonuclear war.

Phil Ochs released a song on his album Rehearsals for Retirement (1969) titled "The Scorpion Departs but Never Returns".

== See also ==
- List of lost United States submarines
- List of sunken nuclear submarines

== Sources ==
- Offley, Ed (2007). Scorpion Down: Sunk by the Soviets, Buried by the Pentagon: The Untold Story of the USS Scorpion. New York: Perseus Books Group. ISBN 978-0-465-00884-1.
- Sewell, Kenneth; Preisler, Jerome (2008). All Hands Down: The True Story of the Soviet Attack on the USS Scorpion. New York: Simon & Schuster. ISBN 978-1-4391-0454-5.
- Sontag, Sherry; Drew, Christopher (2000). Blind Man's Bluff: The Untold Story of American Submarine Espionage. New York: Harper Paperbacks. ISBN 978-0-06-097771-9.
- White, Rowland (2006). Vulcan 607. London: Bantam Press. ISBN 978-0-593-05391-1.
