= National Underwater Reconnaissance Office =

Multi-agency U.S. government entity directing undersea espionage

The National Underwater Reconnaissance Office (NURO) is the "hidden younger brother" of the National Reconnaissance Office (NRO). NRO was initiated in 1960 and developed as a common office for United States Air Force and the Central Intelligence Agency (CIA) to manage satellite reconnaissance. The first revelation about NRO came in 1973, but its very existence was not declassified until 1992. According to Jeffrey T. Richelson, "[m]ost often the Under Secretary of the Air Force served as a Director of the NRO". NURO was initiated in 1969 and developed as a common office or liaison office for the United States Navy and the CIA to manage underwater reconnaissance. NURO used "special project submarines" like USS Seawolf (SSN-575), USS Halibut (SSN-587), and USS Parche (SSN-683) deep inside the waters of the Soviet Union to put out listening devices, tap communication cables, monitor Soviet Navy bases and record sound signatures of Soviet submarines. NURO is a little-known agency; even its name has been secret and its very existence was first revealed in 1998. The United States Secretary of the Navy has served as its director.

== History ==
In Blind Man's Bluff: The Untold Story of American Submarine Espionage, Sherry Sontag and Christopher Drew argue that the origin of NURO was the sinking of Soviet submarine K-129 outside Hawaii in March 1968. When the USS Halibut returned half a year later with 22,000 photos of the Soviet submarine, the CIA realized the significance of underwater reconnaissance. NURO was initially formed by CIA Director Richard Helms and dominated by the CIA: "from the day NURO was formed, the CIA [with its Deputy Director for Science and Technology Carl Duckett] took charge. [Captain James] Bradley [from U.S. Naval Intelligence] could spare only a few people for the new office. His entire staff in the undersea part of Office of Naval Intelligence numbered only about a few dozen. The CIA, however, had no such constraints. It moved in with eight permanent staffers and more consultants loyal to the agency". The Navy prepared to use a midget submarine to investigate K-129 underwater, but the CIA wanted the whole submarine. They built the ship Glomar Explorer (now GSF Explorer) to raise K-129, which became very expensive (up to 500 million dollars). From the mid-1970s, the CIA lost its day-to-day control of NURO. Captain James Bradley was able to conduct his own special project operations. Through Bradley it was a direct link to General Alexander Haig and Henry Kissinger. From 1972 to 1974, the Secretary of Navy John Warner was the director of NURO.

The Chief Scientist of the U.S. Navy, John Piña Craven, argues that Bradley was a Defense Intelligence Agency (DIA) officer at the Office of Naval Intelligence. Craven was a close colleague of Bradley, and Craven seems to indicate that NURO actually was a liaison office not just between the CIA and the Navy but also between the CIA and the DIA using officers from Naval Intelligence. Also others indicate that NURO might have been a CIA-DIA liaison office.

NURO operations were conducted primarily in Soviet home waters using specially equipped nuclear-powered attack submarines or "special project submarines", but this intelligence gathering was, according to Ola Tunander, just a part of NURO's activity. He refers to a high-ranking CIA officer saying that NURO in the 1980s also ran operations in the waters of friendly countries, such as those of Scandinavia, penetrating into the archipelagos and naval bases of Sweden. United States Secretary of Defense Caspar Weinberger stated in 2000 that NURO's submarine operations into Swedish waters in the 1980s were run as a "routine, regular series of defense testing" after US-Swedish Navy-to-Navy consultations. However, these operations may also have had another purpose. ABC-TV said in 1984 of the U.S. submarine intelligence gathering:

"Most of the top-secret missions are into the waters of the Soviet Union, but according to both active duty and retired military sources, some missions have been run into the territorial waters of those nations considered friendly to the U.S. Even friendly countries, sources say, sometimes do things they don't want the U.S. to know about, things that could inadvertently threaten U.S. security. The missions are conducted by specially equipped nuclear-powered attack submarines and in some cases by a nuclear-powered mini-sub called NR-1."

Tunander also says that during this period (1981–87), the Secretary of Navy John Lehman was the Director of NURO.
