= Rudolf Kjellén =

Swedish political scientist (1864–1922)

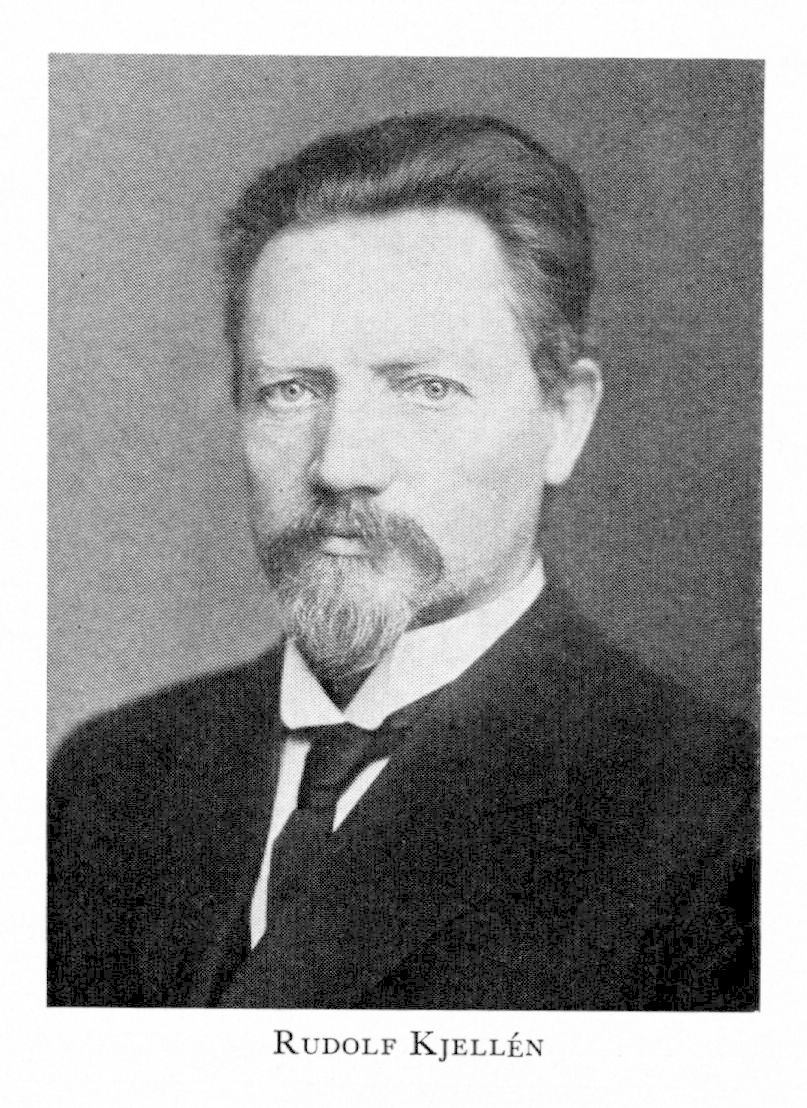
- Born: 13 June 1864; Torsö, Sweden
- Died: 14 November 1922 (aged 58); Uppsala, Sweden
- Resting place: Uppsala Old Cemetery
- Known for: Coining the term geopolitics. The theory that states are organic, living systems.
- Scientific career
- Fields: Political science Geography; Political philosophy
- Workplaces: University of Gothenburg; University of Uppsala

Johan Rudolf Kjellén (Swedish: [ˈrʉːdɔlf ɕɛˈleːn]; 13 June 1864 – 14 November 1922) was a Swedish political scientist, geographer and politician who coined the term geopolitics. His work was influenced by Friedrich Ratzel. Along with Alexander von Humboldt, Carl Ritter, and Ratzel, Kjellén would lay the foundations for the German Geopolitik that would later be espoused prominently by General Karl Haushofer.

Kjellén completed gymnasium in Skara in 1880 and matriculated at Uppsala University the same year. He completed his PhD in Uppsala in 1891 and was a docent there from 1890 to 1893. He also taught at University of Gothenburg from 1891 and was professor of political sciences and statistics there from 1901 until he received the prestigious Skyttean professorship of Eloquence and Government in Uppsala in 1916.

A conservative politician, he was a member of the Second Chamber of the Parliament of Sweden from 1905 to 1908 and of its First Chamber from 1911 to 1917.

== Biography ==
Rudolf Kjellén was born in 1864 in Torsö in what is now Mariestad Municipality. He was the son of the parish priest Anders Kjellén. Rudolf completed his studentexamen at the Cathedral School in Skara, and enrolled at Uppsala University in 1880. In 1890, he completed a thesis in political science and in 1891 was promoted to Doctor of Philosophy. That same year, he became a teacher of political science and, in 1893, also of geography at University of Gothenburg; in 1901, he was appointed professor of political science and statistics there. His earliest scholarly writings concerned the constitutional history of Sweden: Om Eriksgatan (1889), Studies on Ministerial Responsibility (1890), The Riksrätt Institute’s Training in Swedish History (1895). In addition to these major works, he published smaller studies on the 1809 constitutional framework: The National Character in the 1809 Constitution (1893), Who Enacted Sweden’s 1809 Instrument of Government? (1896), The Spirit of the Swedish Constitution (1897), and Dead Letters in Sweden’s Current Instrument of Government (1902).

These early works clearly show the strong influence of his mentor Oscar Alin, who also influenced Kjellén politically. Inspired by Alin, Kjellén published, among other works, The Union as it was Created and as it has Become (1893–94), as a contribution to the union question. Kjellén was also active in the Fosterländska förbundet as a recurring speaker at their public meetings.

Additionally, Kjellén lectured frequently at worker institutes in southwestern Sweden and regularly appeared from 1895 in the conservative press with both opinion pieces and popular-science works. He was a particularly frequent contributor to Göteborgs Aftonblad but also published in Nya Dagligt Allehanda and journals such as Statsvetenskaplig tidskrift and Det nya Sverige. A large number of newspaper articles, journal essays, and other minor studies are collected in Nationell samling. Politiska och etiska fragment (1906), Ett program. Nationella samlingslinjer (1908), Politiska essayer (I–III, 1914–15), and Världspolitiken 1911–1919 (1920).

Kjellén was elected in a by-election in June 1905 as a member of the Second Chamber for the city of Gothenburg and re-elected in September of the same year; he attended the parliaments of 1906–1908. As a parliamentarian, Kjellén emerged in writing and speeches as the leading spokesman for a reformist right-wing party ("Young Right") and as an enthusiastic defender of Sweden's rights in the union disputes with Norway (he opposed the dissolution of the union in 1905).

As a member of the First Chamber from 1911 to 1917 for southern Kalmar County, Kjellén took an active part in the fight for strengthening the military, often emphasizing his conviction about the imminent danger of a great power war; regarding issues of voting duties and the legal status of officials, he prepared extensive motions, and on his proposal, the interpellation system was organized in the First Chamber. From 1912 to 1916 he was a member of the Constitutional Committee and 1916–1917 of the Secret Committee.

In February 1916, Kjellén was appointed to the Skyttean Professorship of Eloquence and Political Science at Uppsala University. From this position, he increasingly concentrated on the branch of political science that he named geopolitics. In this way, Kjellén broke with the liberal and legalistic conception of the state and law, which he did not believe corresponded with empirical reality. His main geopolitical work is considered to be The Great Powers, a work celebrated for its originality and richness of ideas, first published in 1905 and in a second, completely revised and greatly expanded edition, published in four parts from 1911 to 1913. It was also published in a shortened handbook edition titled Contemporary Great Powers (1914), later translated into German (12th edition 1916) and Russian. In The State as a Living Organism (1916) and Outline of a System of Politics (1920), Kjellén presented his new political theory. In the handbooks Sweden (1917) and The Great Powers and the World Crisis (1920), his new system is illustrated practically.

Kjellén became a member of the Gothenburg Society of Sciences and Letters in 1899 and in 1912 of The American Academy of Political and Social Science, and he was awarded an honorary doctorate by University of Rostock in 1918. Through the reorientation Kjellén carried out within political science and thus in the practical sphere of political studies, he elevated the study of political science in Sweden to a higher and broader level.

He died of heart disease in 1922 and is buried in Gamla kyrkogården in Uppsala.

== Political Science ==
When Rudolf Kjellén began his academic career, it was the legal and historical studies that shaped political science, and this was also true of Kjellén's own early studies under Professor Oscar Alin. Over time, however, Kjellén began to lose faith in the value of this type of study.

Rudolf Kjellén believed that political science in his time was in an academic crisis because the field could no longer explain the fundamental question of what the state is. The 19th-century idea that the state was a contract, a legal person whose task was to maintain the rule of law, Kjellén noted, was incompatible with what the state actually did. The modern state also dealt with welfare issues, colonialism, economic activity, cultural policy, and so on. Kjellén thought that political science had focused too much on trying to explain the state rationally and abstractly, and too little on empirically describing what the state actually does. To resolve this situation, Kjellén undertook to try to build a new system for political science studies.

Kjellén's attempt to explain the modern state, and thereby resolve the crisis in political science, is presented in Staten som livsform (1916;The State as a Life-form). He achieves his goal by describing the modern state using a metaphor in which he compares the state to an organism (a living form). According to Kjellén, the state should be understood as a distinct entity driven forward by inherent, or logically necessary, forces of its existence. These forces, he argued, could be studied scientifically, and thus one could explain how states arise, develop, and die. In this way, political science regains its academic purpose in the modern era. Kjellén does not claim that the state is an organism, only that it is the best metaphor to understand the state.

== Political Philosophy ==
Kjellén was active as a political commentator throughout the later part of his life. Not least, he was given space by editor Oscar Norén in the right-wing newspaper Göteborgs Aftonblad. During the many decades that Kjellén was active as a political commentator, his political views also developed and changed.

=== Liberalism and Conservatism ===
Kjellén viewed politics as a dialectic pull between progression (liberalism) and concentration (conservatism). According to Kjellén, both of these forces were equally necessary, and therefore one could not say that the left party was good and the right party bad; they fulfilled different needs. During periods of progression, breakthroughs, expansion, and necessary purges occur. During periods of concentration, instead, there is gathering, joint effort, and a return to order that consolidates what was gained during progression.

Kjellén believed that the liberal wave that since 1789 had dismantled the ancien régime had been a welcome progression, but that by the turn of the century, this wave had gone so far that a period of concentration was now necessary. It was this necessary concentration that Kjellén wished to become a voice for, through the launching of the program that would be carried by the movement called unghögern.

In the essays Den konservativa åskådningen i svensk politik, Reaktion and Höger och vänster (The Conservative View in Swedish Politics, Reaction, and Right and Left), Kjellén describes what practical implications he believes the long period of progression should have for political conservatism at the turn of the century. Conservatism must appear in parliament as a reform party that works for the necessary concentration. According to Kjellén, this concentration should be based on the society's historically grown foundations and not on abstract theories. Inspired by the historical school, Kjellén argued that historically organically developed institutions must be the starting point for the right's reform program. This insight led him to declare that conservatism manifests as "nationalism," because it wants each people to "be blessed in its own way" and rejects the idea of copying the constitutions or social systems of other countries.

=== Nationalism ===
According to Georg Andrén and Ola Tunander, Kjellén's thinking was shaped by a nationalism grounded in the historical school, meaning the view that nations emerged slowly through historical processes rather than being founded on ethnicity or racial biology criteria. As Birger Hagård noted, this meant that Kjellén's nationalism was not chauvinistic. On the contrary, Kjellén believed that the historically organic processes that created nations "should also unite nation-states into higher unions," and that this should be welcomed, as "it is the only organic path to the universal state at the completion of times, on which we all hope." According to Hagård, Kjellén therefore supported the idea of a Europas Förenta Stater (United States of Europe).

Tunander described Kjellén’s ideas about transnational cooperation as practically identical to what later became NATO.

According to Tunander, Kjellén's nationalism was socially conscious and aimed to find a middle path between right and left. He feared the divisive tendencies of class socialism and therefore wanted to see a national socialism to overcome this obstacle. Kjellén used terms such as national unity, national socialism, national democracy, and unghöger (Young right) as synonyms to describe his political idea of a socially reformist program built on Sweden's historical institutions.

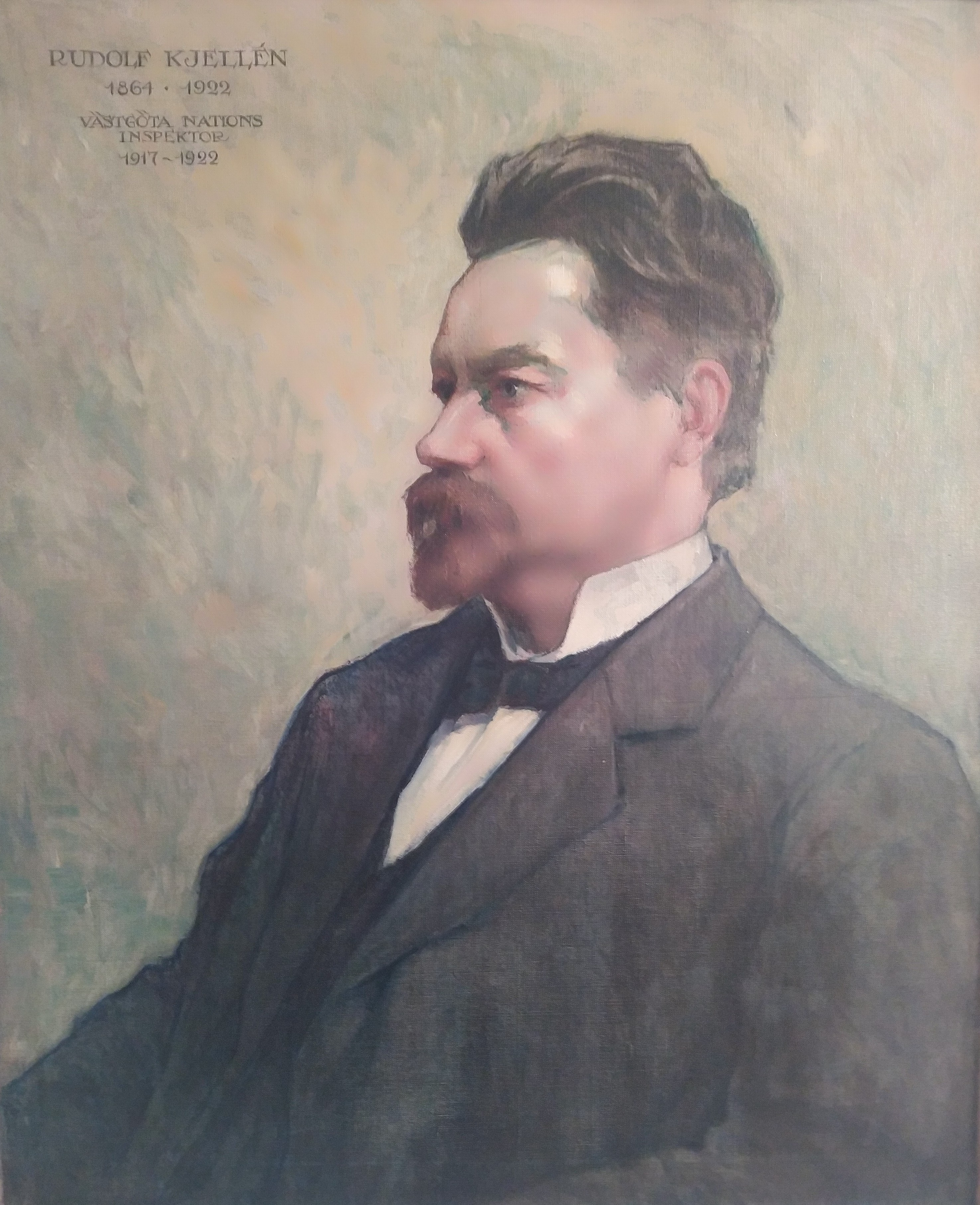
Rudolf Kjellén's inspector portrait at Västgöta nation in Uppsala.

=== Democracy ===
According to Hagård, Kjellén wanted to combine contemporary demands for universal suffrage with the demands to be represented by an association. He therefore proposed an elected Second Chamber and that the First Chamber should be reorganized based on corporatism principles. According to Tunander, Kjellén hoped that universal suffrage would function as a tool against political extremism. Kjellén was also a strong supporter of the 1809 constitutional monarchy with its separation-of-powers functions, and was therefore opposed to so-called lower-house parliamentarism.

=== Folkhemmet ===
Kjellén is considered, both in writing and in public political speeches, to have been the first to coin the concept "folkhemmet" and to have influenced Prime Minister Per Albin Hansson and Minister Ernst Wigforss in their thinking about Kjellén's new concept folkhemmet. P.A. Hansson, however, emphasized that the Social Democratic folkhemmet – unlike Kjellén’s – should be built on the firm foundation of Swedish "democracy" (speech 1921).

=== Women's suffrage ===
Kjellén was one of the most persistent opponents of women's political suffrage and eligibility. This inspired Gothenburg's FKPR to send the following telegram to Kjellén during a tea gathering at Frigga Carlberg’s:

When we soon sit in the Riksdag

You will have to stand outside and watch
For old men may not be there

They only hinder all development.

— Christina Florin (2006)

=== World War I ===
Kjellén saw the outbreak of the First World War as a conflict between what he called ideas of 1789 and the ideas of 1914. He viewed the war as a struggle between progression and concentration and believed that the time had come for concentration. Consequently, Kjellén also advocated for Sweden aligning with Germany in the war, including as one of the authors of the controversial Aktivistboken (Sweden's foreign policy in the light of the World War). He believed that such alignment served Swedish state interests and remained unsentimental regarding German interests. If German state interests conflicted with Swedish interests, Swedish interests would always take precedence.

After the war and the fall of the German Empire, according to some,, Kjellén's warnings about the upcoming anti-democratic risks and his thoughts on an ambivalent future came into full bloom. In a lecture series under the heading "Statsformernas system" in Uppsala in the autumn of 1921, he predicted the imminent collapse of democracy – instead, the so-called popular leader would emerge from the broad ranks of the people:

...when the old kings are overthrown and dead, there is no return to the old monarchy. The man who shall crush the parties and at the same time fulfill the people's need for a leader so that they serve willingly must be of a different kind. /.../ What the misuse of freedom and equality requires is the popular leader, who guarantees order and justice. His emergence shall be guided by an unconscious popular will, even if the conscious governs. But his rule, if it is to be anything other than a momentary trend, a dictatorship, must be built directly on the people. The people want a leader, but they want to retain the illusion of themselves as the principal. On this contradiction rests the new form of state.

However, Kjellén predicting the imminent collapse of democracy and the establishment of a popular dictatorship does not necessarily mean that this was what he himself desired. According to Kjellén, the aforementioned lecture series was part of his political science studies and not opinion sessions. His warning was not in vain, as his prognosis a few years after his death in 1922 could be seen to have been correct.

== Ideas ==
Kjellén was Ratzel's student and would further elaborate on organic state theory, coining the term "geopolitics" in the process. Geopolitics for Kjellén was theory and war its "experimental field." He was also influenced by John Robert Seeley and Heinrich von Treitschke, who were advocates of imperialism.

The basics of his ideas were presented in 1900 in the book Introduction to Sweden's Geography (based on lectures at University of Gothenburg). Kjellén's Staten som lifsform (1916) is often regarded as his most significant work. According to the political scientist Peter Davidsen, Kjellén theorized that states consist of five elements that should be studied by five political-scientific disciplines: geopolitics, demopolitics, eco-politics, sociopolitics and cratopolitics.

Kjellén disputed the solely legalistic characterization of states and asserted that state and society are not opposites but a synthesis of the two elements. The state has a responsibility for law and order but also for social welfare/progress, and economic welfare/progress. Besides legalistic, states have organic characterization. State territories are linked together in "organic connection as bodies with hearts and lungs and less noble parts." As any living form, states must expand or die. This is due not to pure pull for conquest but to natural necessary growth for the sake of self-preservation.

Echoing Ratzel's law of expanding spaces, Kjellén states that large states expand at the expense of the small. This law has many aberrations but these aberrations only mean that it takes more time for great spaces to become organized. It is therefore merely a question of time before the great realms will have grown into their space, and in the long range the indicated tendency is valid without reservation. Nevertheless, Kjellén leaves a chance for Sweden. He stresses a factor which later would be termed as imperial overstretch. The unconstrained, endless "stretching of the borders" increases friction and external vulnerability. Cohesion is hard even in the age of communication. Hence the future is not so dark for the smaller states.

Autarky for Kjellén was a solution to a political problem, not an economic policy in itself. Dependence on imports meant that a country was not economically self-sufficient.

== Influence ==
General Karl Haushofer, who would adopt many of Kjellén's ideas, was not interested in economic policy but would advocate autarky as well; a nation constantly in struggle would demand self-sufficiency.

Kjellén also (but after Maurice Barrès and numerous "national socialist" parties such as the Czech National Social Party) was an early user of the term "national socialism" in 1910. His terminology took form in the Swedish postwar welfare state, Folkhemmet, a term that he coined, which was largely inspired by the social reform-minded conservatism of Otto von Bismarck's Germany.

Geopolitics was revived in the United States by Zbigniew Brzezinski, Henry Kissinger, and Robert Kaplan.

== See also ==
- Biopolitics

== Sources ==
- Dorpalen, Andreas. The World of General Haushofer. Farrar & Rinehart, Inc., New York: 1984.
- Kjellén, Rudolf, Die Grossmaechte der Gegenwart. Leipzig, Berlin, 1914.
- Kjellén, Rudolf, Die politische Probleme des Weltkrieges. Leipzig, 1916.
- Kjellén, Rudolf, Staten som lifsform. Stockholm, 1916.
- Kjellén, Rudolf, Der Staat als Lebensform. Leipzig, 1917.
- Kjellén, Rudolf, Die Grossmaechte vor und nach dem Weltkriege. Leipzig, Berlin, 1930.
- Mattern, Johannes. Geopolitik: Doctrine of National Self-Sufficiency and Empire. The Johns Hopkins Press, Baltimore: 1942.
- Tunander, Ola. 'Swedish-German Geopolitics for a New Century – Rudolf Kjellén's ‘The State as a Living Organism’, Review of International Studies, vol. 27, no. 3, 2001.
