= Torso (disambiguation) =

The torso is the central part of the body. As such, torso is also used to refer to works of art depicting that body part, for example Belvedere Torso.

Torso may also refer to:

- Torsö, an island in Sweden
- Torsö (crater), a crater on the planet Mars
- Torso (Image Comics), a graphic novel by Brian Michael Bendis
- Torso (1973 film), an Italian thriller by Sergio Martino
- Torso (1983 film), a Swedish ballet documentary choreographed by Jiří Kylián
