= Dirk Pohlmann =

German journalist

Dirk Pohlmann (born August 11, 1959) is a German journalist, author, screenwriter, director and producer of around 20 historical documentaries for German public media Arte, ARD and ZDF.

He held positions of leadership in CargoLifter World and ArtemiFlow. From 2019 to 2025, Dirk Pohlmann served as the editor-in-chief of Free21, an alternative German political blog and print journal. He also makes contributions to the American News Programme TNT Radio.

After 2004, Pohlmann's main focus has been on intelligence operations during the Cold War and after. Since 2016, he has published only in alternative media.

== Life ==
After his Abitur, Pohlmann studied journalism, philosophy as well as public law at Johannes Gutenberg University in Mainz. He served in the German Bundeswehr. He mentions about his studies, that he was especially impressed by the Jesuit Helmut Erlinghagen who was a personal witness of the effects of the atomic bombings of Hiroshima and Nagasaki.

In 1986 Pohlmann started with the production of mainly historical and political documentaries. After his film on CargoLifter, and after starting to work as a freelance in-house documentarian, he became a manager of CargoLifter World. It went into insolvency with its parent company Cargolifter AG in 2002. Pohlmann attributed the difficult situation of Cargolifter mainly to the German public media, and to the unpreparedness of politicians in Germany, which in the end led to leaving their business to US companies. After the "initial hype" about CargoLifter, the media in Germany had "howled in chorus like a pack of wolves" and had produced only variations of one false claim:

"CargoLifter must fail, because airships are a harebrained idea." Loss of reality and absence of diversity are a basic problem of today's German media. They align their assessments with the reporting of leading media, i.e. among themselves, instead of reality.

According to Pohlmann’s published author biography, in his time with CargoLifter, Pohlman received training as a project manager.

After 2012, he was managing director of chemist Peter Seeberger's pharmaceutical company ArtemiFlow which specialised in the production of the antimalarial drug Artemisin. Before, in 2008, he had produced a documentary on it, called The Sugar Code. He ended his contract as CEO in 2017 when Peter Seeberger himself took over. In his time with ArtemiFlow, Pohlmann gained insight into the business practices of pharmaceutical companies and the influence of the Gates Foundation on vaccination and antimalarial drugs.

In 2015 he terminated his work as a contractor for public-service media. According to his own account, he could no longer work for ZDF or ARD because his most recent documentaries, especially Deception – Reagan's Method (2014) had been censored, edited, and distorted without his consent in order to align them with more politically correct or less sensitive viewpoints.

== Documentaries ==
Pohlmann has produced around 20 documentaries for German public media Arte, ARD and ZDF. These include, among others, (titles translated into English) The Secret Air War of the Superpowers (Arte, 2004), UFOs, Lies and the Cold War (Arte, 2005), Mengele's Heirs' (arte, 2010), Israel and the Bomb (Arte/ZDF, 2012) and Deception – Reagan's Method (2014). This last documentary won an award at the St. Petersburg Film Festival.

== Cooperation with alternative media ==
Pohlmann frequently contributes to German alternative media. He was a guest in programmes of RT Deutsch and Sputnik News. He regularly published his own contributions at KenFM. Since March 2018, Pohlmann has hosted a critique of Wikipedia with former biology teacher Markus Fiedler in Fiedler's series Geschichten aus Wikihausen (Stories from Wikihausen), which appear on their eponymous YouTube channel. With Robert Fleischer and Mathias Bröckers he hosts the video channel Das Dritte Jahrtausend (The 3rd Millennium) on ExoMagazinTV.

In 2018, Pohlmann published a text in the German Political Blog NachDenkSeiten in which he, according to the Amadeu Antonio Foundation, insinuates that Wikipedia is controlled by the Israeli foreign intelligence service Mossad, which would "flood the Internet with pro-Israeli content" and ensure that activities of "anti-Israeli activists come to a standstill". Wikipedia, he said, exercises absolute domination and has "established a monopoly of power that is incompatible with democracy." The intelligence services of the so-called "US empire" which are equated with the "deep state" are alleged to determine the "synchronized reporting of the media" in Germany as well for the interests of capital against the living realities of the populations in Europe.

Pohlmann participates in the Youtube format Nato Investigation Committee, which was started shortly before the Russian invasion of Ukraine.

On Australian TNT he hosts the Dirk Pohlmann Show. He has invited and interviewed, among other guests, Ola Tunander, Alfred De Zayas, Roberto Pinotti, Patrick Baab, Sucharit Bhakdi Jens Berger, Ola Frithiofson, Hans Gaiswinkler, and Jacques Baud.

== Criticism of Wikipedia, since 2018 ==
In 2018 he gained public attention in Germany with his criticism of political networking within Wikipedia. A preliminary injunction against a group of Wikipedia critics concerning him, among others, because they had disclosed the identity of a Wikipedia author, was lifted in early 2019. In doing so, the court had followed the view that the "applicant was editing Wikipedia articles in an opinionated manner" and thus the user's disclosure had been in the public interest. In January 2021, the Süddeutsche Zeitung reported that Fiedler and Pohlmann had named another volunteer Wikipedia author and local politician in a video because of a correction in a Wikipedia article with real name, photo, phone number and email address and called to "tell him what you think of his activities". Subsequently, threats were made against the author.

== Briefing the UN Security Council, 2023 ==
Russia invited Pohlmann to speak at a meeting of the United Nations Security Council on September 26 2023 which had been requested by Russia to gain support for a UN investigation. He spoke alongside Jimmy Dore about the Gas pipe explosions in the Nord Stream pipelines. Pohlmann said that after a year still "astonishing little" was known about the Nord Stream explosions. He rejected the "Western-sponsored conspiracy theory" that identifies the Russian Federation as the culprit. In his opinion, the authorities conducting ongoing investigations, Germany, Denmark and Sweden "know enough". He added the truth "would open a Pandora's box for the North Atlantic Treaty Organization (NATO)". Pohlmann presented evidence from Ola Tunander of the Peace Research Institute Oslo: The depth of the explosives of 75 to 80 meters requires the use of a decompression chamber and indicates the participation of professional or military divers. Pohlmann referred to the routes of the Poseidon aircraft mentioned in Seymour Hersh's report, to official assessments of the explosive charge equivalent to a few hundred kilograms of conventional explosives as presented by Hans Benjamin Braun. He put forward his understanding that there was geophysical evidence for the use of an explosive charge at least 1,000 times of what has been reported previously, a charge not possible for conventional explosives. In his view, the location of the explosives was designed to generate a shock wave directed at Kaliningrad. Pohlmann mentioned the large number of hydrophones which had enabled Western countries since the late 1970s to identify every vessel on and below the surface. He added an example for his point of US involvement that Soviet pipelines had already been a target of Western intelligence in the past. In addition, Former German Chancellor, Helmut Schmidt, he stated, had fallen out of grace with President Ronald Reagan when he insisted on a deal to secure "cheap Soviet gas" for Europe.

== Reception ==
In Rudolf Peter's ZDFinfo report Russia Germans – Tradition, Freedom, Frustration from 2019, an excerpt from a lecture given by Pohlmann at the peace demonstration in Dresden was broadcast. Pohlmann expressed that "the military option is the mindset of Americans, that is, from the American point of view, war is a very profitable business." In this context, Pohlmann is described as an "activist[s] who thinks the U.S. is a warmonger and likes to give interviews for RT ...." Pohlmann believes the Western media are not neutral but propaganda tools of NATO. He and Sergei Filbert, a YouTuber, who is supposed to be extremely influential in Russia, were fighting for the same cause, "creating good vibes (German: Stimmung machen) for Russia's view of the world."

Oliver Reinhard described Pohlmann in the Sächsische Zeitung 2021 as "especially adept at self-promotion as a universal expert of almost Goethean character". Pohlmann contributes in "alternative" media "actually to everything some 'expert knowledge'": "Nawalny, Middle East conflict, Greens, Olof Palm murder, whales, ravens ..."

The Journalist Sebastian Leber referred to Pohlmann in the Tagesspiegel in April 2022 as a "conspiracy ideologue" who had conspired jointly in the secret action "Leberschaden" (liver damage) with the "who's who of the German swashbuckler scene (German: Schwurblerszene)," especially blogger Robert Cibis. They had planned a concerted smear campaign to "drag down" the Tagesspiegel and "catch the sniper." In July 2022, on the occasion of the Pax Terra Musica festival, Leber referred to Pohlmann, along with Robert Fleischer and Mathias Bröckers, as one of three "scene-known conspiracy ideologue(s)" who had attracted attention in the past for spreading crude conspiracy theories.

== Filmography ==
=== Main films ===
- 1996: Kurklinik Rosenau
- 2000: Heimatfront (series of three parts)
- 2000: Soldaten hinter Stacheldraht (part of Heimatfront)
- 2003: Abschuss über der Sowjetunion – Der geheime Luftkrieg der Supermächte
- 2004: Zeitreisen – Geschichte entdecken (series of three parts)
- 2004: Der geheime Luftkrieg der Supermächte
- 2005: Ufos, Lügen und der Kalte Krieg
- 2005: In feindlichen Tiefen – Der geheime U-Boot-Krieg der Supermächte (also known as Der geheime U-Boot-Krieg der Supermächte – Deutschland)
- 2006: ZDF Expeditionen – Magische Welten (TV series, Shangri-La – Spurensuche in Tibet)
- 2006: Hinter den feindlichen Linien – Geheimoperationen im Kalten Krieg
- 2007: Kriegsbeute Mensch – Wie Regierungen ihre Soldaten verraten
- 2007: Ich wollte nicht mehr aufstehen – Neue Forschung gegen Depressionen
- 2008: Der Zuckercode – Geheimwaffe gegen Krebs und Malaria?
- 2009: Geheimnis Area 51 – MiGs im Sperrgebiet
- 2010: Mengeles Erben – Menschenexperimente im kalten Krieg
  - 2010 English version: Doctors of Death.
- 2011: Tod in der Tiefe – Schlagabtausch der Supermächte
- 2012: Israel und die Bombe – Ein radioaktives Tabu
- 2013: Dienstbereit – Nazis und Faschisten im Dienste der CIA (with Florian Hartung)
- 2014: Täuschung – Die Methode Reagan
- 2016: Transportgiganten – Das Comeback der Luftschiffe (with Cornelia Borrmann and Felix Krüger, in Ozon Unterwegs, rbb, 25. April 2016)
- 2016: Europas größte Marsmission (with Cornelia Borrmann)
- 2017: Dickopfs Doppelspiel

=== Mengeles Erben ("Mengele's Heirs"), ===
"Mengele's Heirs", in the English version with the title "Doctors of Death, is a documentary by Dirk Pohlmann that explores the gruesome history of experiments conducted on human subjects in the name of military and medical research. The film delves into the horrors inflicted on people who were deliberately subjected to poisons, deadly bacteria, viruses, psychotropic drugs, and even nuclear radiation. Pohlmann's thesis is that Josef Mengele, the infamous doctor from Auschwitz, was not the only one to use prisoners for lethal experiments, and the Nazi state was not the sole perpetrator of such criminal medicine. The documentary suggests that doctors and biochemists continued these practices in various countries, including Japan, North Korea, the United States, and Eastern Bloc nations, well after World War II. The film raises questions about the ethics and recklessness of these experiments, particularly during the Cold War era. The documentary relies on interviews, archive excerpts, and defector accounts, shedding light on a disturbing chapter of history, writes Hendrik Feindt from the Tagesspiegel in his review.

=== Täuschung – Die Methode Reagan ("Deception - Reagan's method") ===
In accordance with the program information about the film given by ARD, Ronald Reagan considered the secret warfare of the United States during the Cold War to be of paramount importance in 1981. The "Committee for Deceptive Operations" was one of the crucial instruments employed in the battle against the Soviet Union, alongside the arms race.

Gas pipelines were sabotaged using implanted computer chips and trojans, and aerial and naval maneuvers were executed in front of the Soviet Union's primary base in Murmansk. The overarching objective of these actions was to create uncertainty and humiliation, all while demonstrating strength and technological superiority.

The film also addresses the sabotage of the diplomatic efforts made by Olof Palme, Willy Brandt, and Egon Bahr. It analyzes covert operations aimed at reinforcing the public perception of an allegedly aggressive Soviet Union, undermining the peace initiatives of Swedish Prime Minister Olof Palme, and binding neutral Sweden as an "aircraft carrier" to NATO.

Author Wolfgang Bittner characterizes the film as "highly informative and horrifying," noting its coverage of various other covert operations conducted by the United States. Bittner also mentions the employment of "hybrid warfare" to weaken Soviet industry. In mid-1982, this strategy resulted in the explosion of the Jamal Pipeline in Siberia, one of the largest non-nuclear explosions in the world. The assassination of Olof Palme is also linked to this USA strategy, as well as efforts to discredit Gorbachev.

== Bibliography ==
- Wernicke, Jens; Pohlmann, Dirk; Chomsky, Noam; Mausfeld, Rainer; Hedges, Chris; Eisenstein, Charles; Ruppert, Franz; Mies, Ullrich; Ahmed, Nafeez; Leukefeld, Karin; Kirner, Florian; Böttcher, Sven; Pichler, Steffen; Cook, Jonathan; Bonath, Susan; Pomrehn, Wolfgang; Bartunek, Stephan; Rottenfußer, Roland; Grassmann, Peter H.; Hussain, Murtaza; Moegling, Klaus; Johnstone, Caitlin; Benjamín, Medea; Lenz, Anselm; Feistel, Felix; Riedl, Nicolas; Bernert, Jens; Ploppa, Hermann; Buchgut (2019). Die Öko-Katastrophe den Planeten zu retten, heißt die herrschenden Eliten zu stürzen (in German). Mainz. ISBN 978-3-96789-000-6. OCLC 1126576235.
- Im Auftrag der Eliten (in German). Frankfurt am Main. 2021. ISBN 978-3-86489-272-1. OCLC 1242423302.
