= Ola Tunander =

Scandinavian researcher

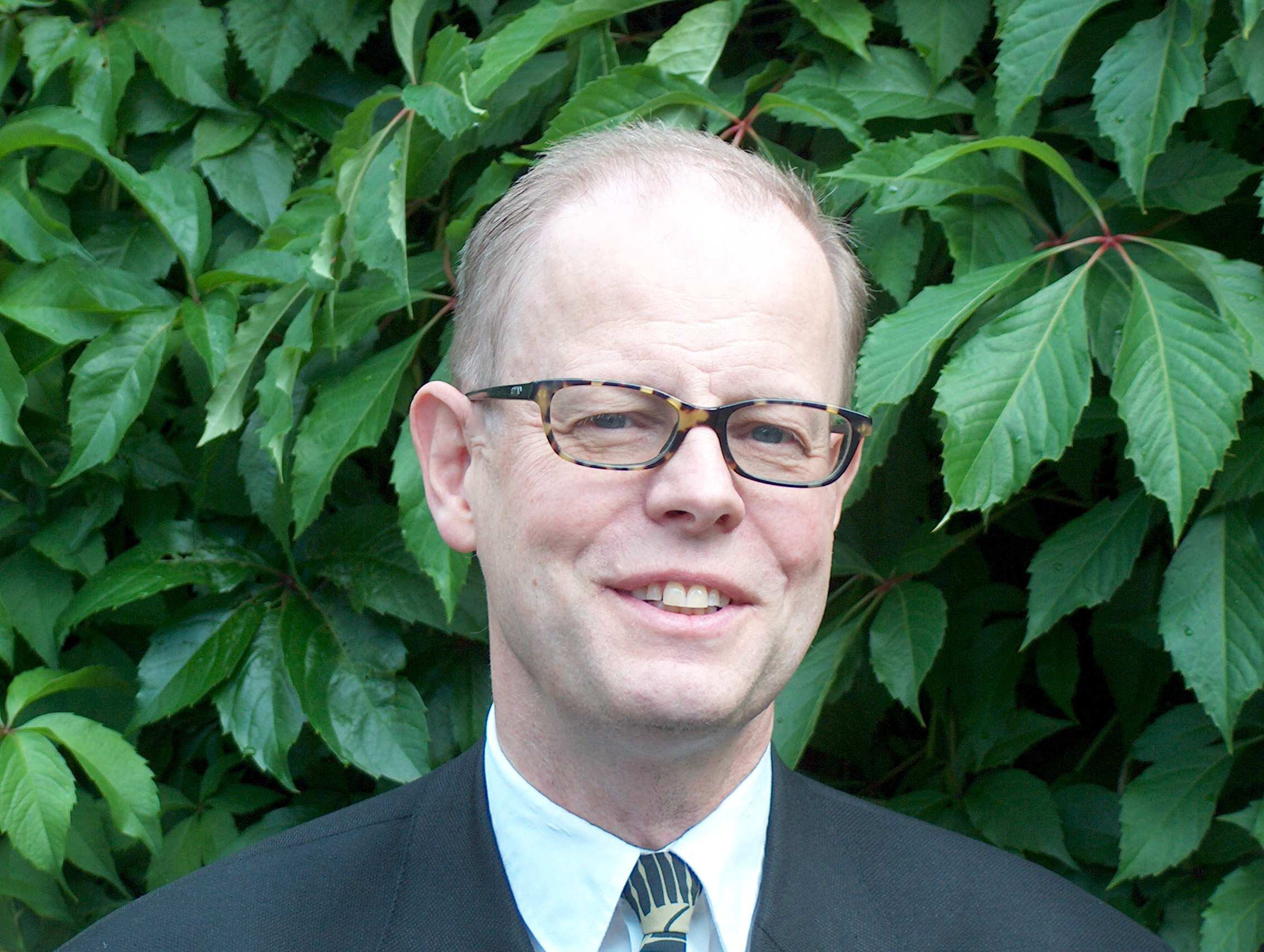
- Born: November 19, 1948 (age 77); Stockholm, Sweden
- Education: Linköping University
- Scientific career
- Fields: International relations, peace and conflict studies

Göran Ola Tunander (born 1948) is a research professor emeritus at the Peace Research Institute Oslo (PRIO, Norway). He worked as a researcher at PRIO in the period 1987-2016. He is the son of Museum Director Ingemar Tunander and his first wife Gunvor (born Lilja). Tunander is married to the Chinese scholar Yao Xiaoling. He has written and edited 12 books and a number of articles on security politics, naval strategy, submarine operations, geopolitics, dual state, psychological operations (PSYOP) and Cold War history.

== Education and early career ==
After obtaining a Masters in economic history at the University of Gothenburg (Sweden) in 1981, Tunander wrote for philosophical magazines and in 1985 he published two books in Swedish. In 1987, he wrote a volume on United States Maritime Strategy for the Swedish Defence Research Agency. In 1989, he defended his doctoral dissertation at the Department for Technology and Social Change, Linköping University. While finalizing his doctoral thesis Cold Water Politics (1989) on US Maritime Strategy, technology, and the geopolitics of the North, he received a research position at PRIO in Oslo. In 1989, he was appointed Senior Research Fellow and was given tenure. He lectured at the U.S. Center for Naval Analyses and Naval Postgraduate School. In 1995, he became the head of PRIO's Foreign and Security Policy Program. In 2000, he was appointed research professor.

== Career ==
From the early 1990s, Tunander wrote on military strategy, confidence-building measures, region-building and US remaking of world order. He headed a Nordic study group, "A new Europe", from mid-1980s with Ole Wæver, Iver B. Neumann, Sverre Jervell, and Espen Barth Eide. Robert Bathurst and Tunander initiated Norwegian-Russian dialogue seminars in the early 1990s. In 1994, he co-edited a volume on the post-Cold War regional cooperation in Arctic Europe, The Barents Region with contributions by Norwegian and Russian foreign ministers. Tunander wrote contributions about Northern Europe, Nordic Cooperation, and Scandinavism published by the Norwegian Ministry of Foreign Affairs and the Swedish Olof Palme International Center. He contributed to the Russian journal International Affairs. Tunander wrote and edited two Swedish books on power, identity, and territory and co-edited Geopolitics in Post-Wall Europe (1997). After 2000, he organized Nordic-Chinese dialogue conferences with the China Institute of International Studies and the Nordic peace research and international affairs institutes. He also participated in a Washington dialogue.

Tunander wrote articles on geopolitics, "amputation of territories", and the geopolitical scholar Rudolf Kjellén for Security Dialogue, Review of International Studies, Cooperation and Conflict, and Geopolitics, as well as for the Italian journal Limes. He argued in articles and in a book, Government of the Shadows (2009), that U.S. hegemonic power divided the single Western state into a "dual state": a regular democratic hierarchy versus a security hierarchy linked to the U.S. He developed the concept of "dual state" as composed by a regular democratic state or "public state" that acts according to the rule of law, and by a covert "deep state" or "security state" able to veto the decisions of the former (Morgenthau) and to "securitize" regular politics by making certain activities an issue of life and death. His concept of the "deep state" was in 2007 brought to the US by Peter Dale Scott. Tunander quotes his conversation with James Schlesinger, who spoke about a Swedish "dual state": the neutral "Political Sweden" versus the "Military Sweden" that, according to Schlesinger, was "planning to get the USA involved as soon as possible".

In 2008, Tunander was the subject of some controversy in Norway after publicly questioning the U.S. government inquiry on the 9/11 attacks, suggesting that al-Qaeda may not have been ultimately responsible and citing claims that the World Trade Center had been brought down by explosions. He later claimed that Anders Behring Breivik was possibly an Israeli agent.

=== The submarine debate ===
In the 1980s, a series of suspected foreign incursions in Swedish territorial waters triggered repeated military submarine hunts off Sweden's coast. The submarine hunts, as well as the spectacular stranding of Soviet submarine S-363 outside Sweden's main naval base in 1981, drew considerable attention and became fodder for domestic political controversy. Following a government investigation in 1983, the Swedish government sent a diplomatic protest note to the Soviet Union, accusing it of responsibility for repeated violations of Sweden's territorial integrity. Moscow denied having committed any intentional incursions while dismissing the S-363 incident as an accidental error of navigation.

As time passed, some of the Swedish military's observations were contradicted by new evidence, undermining some of the arguments against the Soviet Union. There followed a debate about the extent of Soviet involvement, and new investigations were launched. Tunander now emerged as a particularly prominent proponent of the idea that many or all of the incursions had in fact been staged by NATO under CIA oversight and with the complicity of Swedish government officials, to be falsely blamed on the Soviet Union.

In 2001, Tunander was enlisted as a civilian expert to contribute to a new government inquiry led by Rolf Ekéus. In the investigation's official report, Ekéus concluded that foreign submarines had in fact violated Swedish waters in the 1980s, up until approximately 1992. In contrast with the 1983 investigation that had blamed the Soviet Union, however, he stated that there existed "no solid evidence that allows any conclusions to be made about the nationality of the violating submarines." Even so, Ekéus noted that he "does not support the theories proposed by Tunander."

Tunander has remained involved with the submarine debate. He wrote a Swedish book Hårsfjärden (2001), articles for the Swedish Journal of War Sciences, the Zürich-based Parallel History Project.

In these works, Tunander suggested that Soviet submarines might very well have entered Swedish waters, but the more visible operations were most likely PSYOPs decided by a U.S. "deception operation committee" chaired by CIA Director William Casey, and some of them were run by a CIA-Navy liaison office, National Underwater Reconnaissance Office, headed by Secretary of Navy John Lehman.

A Danish Government Inquiry on the Cold War (2005) and the Finnish Cold War History (2006) used Tunander's works, which provoked a debate. The author of the Danish inquiry and the authors of the Finnish and Norwegian Cold War histories wrote forewords to Tunander's volume Spelet under ytan (The Game beneath the Surface) for a Swedish Cold War history project (2007).

Dirk Pohlmann's French-German TV-documentary (by Arte and ZDF, 2005) was largely based on Tunander's work. In 2007-2008, Swedish TV aired documentaries based on Tunander's work and The Sunday Times in Britain presented his work.

Tunander's arguments have drawn strong pushback from many of the government and military officials involved with the submarine hunts, but also gained some support.

Sweden's former chief of defense and former chief of staff wrote articles rejecting Tunander's claims. Former Chief of Defence General Bengt Gustafsson published a book in 2010, which criticised Tunander's views as conspiracy theory.

Tunander was, however, supported by Mattias Mossberg, a former ambassador who had served as secretary to the Ekéus investigation. Tunander also received support from former Finnish President Mauno Koivisto, who called the operations "provocations" and recalled Soviet leader Yuri Andropov telling him that the Swedes should sink every intruding submarine, so they could see themselves what turned up.

== Books in English ==
- Cold Water Politics: The Maritime Strategy and Geopolitics of the Northern Front (London: Sage, 1989). ISBN 0-8039-8219-4; ISBN 978-0-8039-8219-2.
- The Barents Region: Regional Cooperation in Arctic Europe, with Olav Schram Stokke eds. (London: SAGE, 1994). ISBN 0-8039-7897-9; ISBN 978-0-8039-7897-3.
- Geopolitics in Post-Wall Europe: Security, Territory and Identity, with Pavel Baev and Victoria Einagel eds. (London: Sage, 1997). ISBN 0-7619-5549-6; ISBN 978-0-7619-5549-8.
- European Security Identities: Contested understandings of EU and NATO, with Peter Burgess, eds. (Oslo: PRIO, 2000). ISBN 82-7288-210-8.
- The Secret War against Sweden: US and British Submarine Deception in the 1980s (London & New York: Frank Cass & Routledge, 2004). ISBN 0-7146-5322-5; ISBN 978-0-7146-5322-8.

== Books in Swedish and Norwegian ==
- Den Svarta Duvan – Essäer om makt, teknik och historia [The Black Dove – Essays on Power, Technology and History] (Lund: Symposion, 1985). ISBN 91-85040-01-0.
- På Autobahn mot sekelskiftet [On Autobahn towards the Turn of the Century] (Lund: Symposion, 1985). ISBN 91-7868-016-6.
- Norden och USAs maritima strategi – En studie av Nordens förändrade strategiska läge [The Nordic Countries and the US Maritime Strategy – A Study of the Changed Strategic Position of the Nordic Area]. 'Försvarets forskningsanstalt [Swedish National Defence Research Institute], Stockholm: FOA Rapport C 10295-1.4, 1987. ISSN 0281-0247.
- Murar – Essäer om makt, identitet och territorialitet [Walls – Essays on Power, Identity and Territoriality] (Ålborg: Nordic Summer University, 1995). ISBN 87-87564-72-6; ISBN 82-7198-025-4; ISBN 91-88484-10-6; ISBN 9979-837-10-1.
- Europa och Muren – Om ‘den andre', gränslandet och historiens återkomst i 90-talets Europa [Europe and the Wall – On ‘the Other', the Borderland and the Return of History in Europe of the 1990s], ed. (Ålborg: Nordic Summer University, 1995). ISBN 87-87564-69-6; ISBN 9979 -837-07-1; ISBN 82-7198-023-8; ISBN 91-88484-08-4.
- Hårsfjärden – Det hemliga ubåtskriget mot Sverige [Hårsfjärden – The Secret Submarine War against Sweden] (Stockholm: Norstedts Förlag, 2001). ISBN 91-1-301038-7.
- Spelet under ytan – Teknisk bevisning i nationalitesfrågan för ubåtsoperationen mot Sverige 1982, published by the Swedish research program: 'Sverige under kalla kriget' [Sweden during the Cold War], no. 16 (Gothenburg Univ. & Stockholm Univ., 2007). ISSN 1402-5507 (A revised edition was published on the PRIO website in 2009). http://file.prio.no/files/projects/Spelet%20under%20ytan/Spelet-under-ytan.pdf.
- Libyenkrigets geopolitik - Humanitär intervention eller kolonialkrig? [The geopolitics of the Libyan war - Humanitarian intervention or colonial warfare?] (Lund: Celanders Förlag, 2012). ISBN 978-91-87393-00-6.
- Libyakrigen - Bruken av retorikk og bedrag for å ødelegge en stat [The Libya War - The Use of Rhetoric and Deception to Destroy a State] (Oslo Sirkel Forlag, 2018). ISBN 978-82-93534-14-3.
