= Ronald Pelton =

US intelligence analyst convicted of espionage (1941–2022)

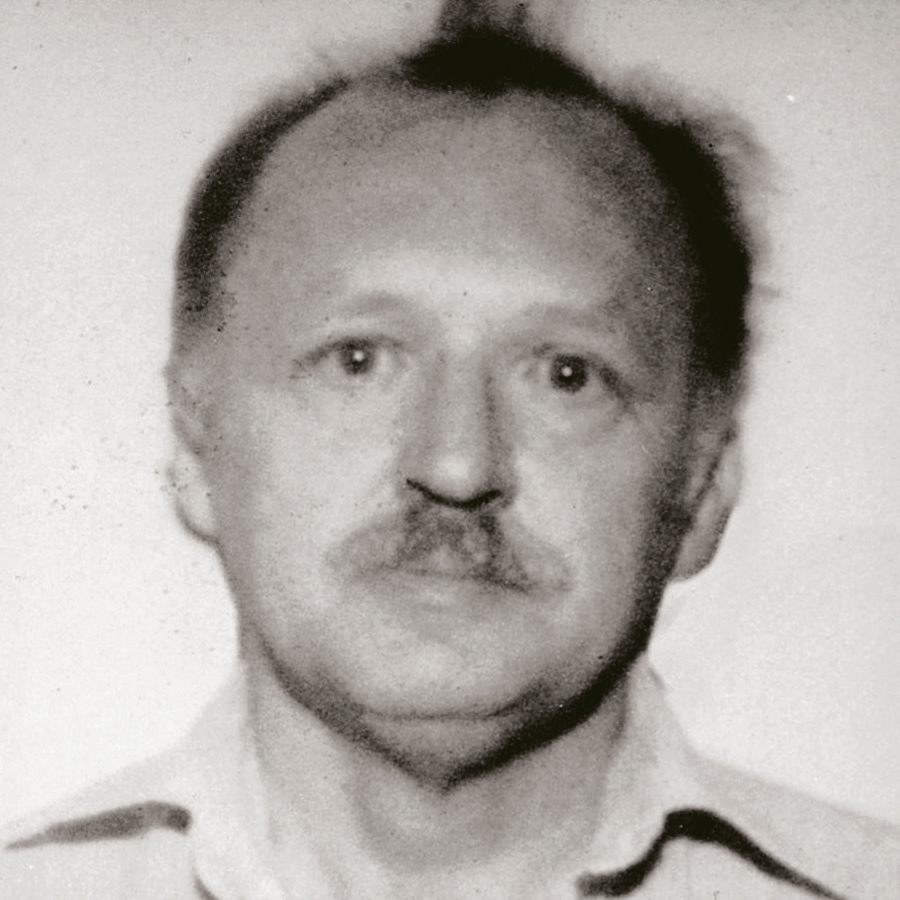
- Born: November 18, 1941; Benton Harbor, Michigan, U.S.
- Died: September 6, 2022 (aged 80); Frederick, Maryland, U.S.
- Occupation: National Security Agency officer
- Children: 4
- Status: Deceased
- Convictions: Espionage (18 U.S.C. § 794); Attempted espionage (18 U.S.C. § 794); Conspiracy to commit espionage (18 U.S.C. § 794); Unauthorized disclosure of classified information concerning communications intelligence (18 U.S.C. § 798)
- Penalty: 3 life sentences plus 10 years

Ronald William Pelton (November 18, 1941 – September 6, 2022) was a National Security Agency (NSA) intelligence analyst who was convicted in 1986 of spying for and selling secrets to the Soviet Union. One such top secret operation he compromised was Operation Ivy Bells.

== Early life ==
Pelton was born in Benton Harbor, Michigan, and graduated in 1960 in the upper 25 percent of his high school class.

== Career ==
Prior to his employment by the NSA, Pelton served in the United States Air Force. He was taught Russian by the Air Force and served for a time in the early 1960s in Peshawar, Pakistan, as a voice intercept processing specialist. After that 15-month tour, he was transferred to the National Security Agency, where he continued as a civilian employee upon discharge.

Pelton filed for personal bankruptcy in 1979 and resigned from his $24,500-a-year job ($108,700 today) with the NSA A Group. From 1980 to 1984 he held several jobs, none within the intelligence community. In 1984, Pelton faced financial difficulties due to increasing homeowners' taxes and a mounting series of necessary repairs on his private residence.

=== Defection to the Soviet Union ===
Pelton contacted the Soviet Embassy in Washington, D.C., on January 14, 1980, and arranged for a meeting at the embassy. The FBI had surveillance on the embassy and had tapped the phone. Therefore, it anticipated the arrival of the caller but was unable to observe him in time to determine his identity. He was debriefed by KGB officer Vitaly Yurchenko and disclosed Operation Ivy Bells, an NSA and United States Navy program to surreptitiously wiretap undersea communication cables to monitor Soviet military communications and track Soviet submarines.

On trips to Vienna in 1980 and 1983, Pelton stayed at the residence of the Soviet Ambassador to Austria and underwent debriefing sessions that sometimes lasted eight hours a day with KGB officer Anatoly Slavnov. Even though Pelton had left the NSA, he may have continued to be valuable to the Soviets as an intelligence consultant, helping them interpret data obtained from other sources. Pelton had no classified documents to offer but relied on his excellent memory and encyclopaedic knowledge to provide information. He was paid about $37,000 (equivalent to $144,600 in 2025) by the Soviets.

=== Capture and incarceration ===
In 1985, KGB officer Vitaly Yurchenko defected to the United States and, among other things, recalled that he had met with a former NSA analyst in 1980 and described him as red-haired. The FBI scoured NSA personnel files until it had a pool of red-haired male analysts. They were thus able to identify Pelton's voice and began surveillance on him in October 1985. Despite bugging his car and his home, they were unable to find any incriminating evidence.

Therefore, the FBI decided to confront Pelton directly, playing him the tape of his conversation with the Soviet embassy. Eventually Pelton revealed that he had provided answers to questions from the Soviets in return for $35,000. Pelton was tried and convicted of espionage in 1986 and sentenced to three concurrent life sentences plus ten years. He was also fined $100.

Pelton was federal inmate number 22914-037, incarcerated at the Federal Correctional Institution, Allenwood, a medium-security facility in Pennsylvania. Because the federal government still had parole at the time, he had the opportunity for release. Pelton was released from prison on November 24, 2015.

== Death ==
Pelton died in Frederick, Maryland, on September 6, 2022, at the age of 80.
