= ArtemiFlow =

German biotechnology company

- Industry: Biotechnology
- Founded: 2012
- Founder: Peter Seeberger
- Headquarters: Potsdam
- Key people: Adam Maust (CEO)
- Website: www.artemiflow.com

ArtemiFlow is a biotechnology company, founded in 2012 by Peter Seeberger. The company produces and sells pharmaceutical drugs containing the active ingredient artemisinin and its derivatives to fight malaria, cancer and other diseases. The company is headquartered in Potsdam, Germany. As of 2025, Adam Maust is the CEO of ArtemiFlow.

== Science and development ==
Seeberger developed a process to produce artemisinin in large quantities in a cost-effective and environmentally friendly way, especially to meet the needs of developing countries. This was an alternative to Sanofi's genetic engineering process.

Initial difficulties were the large-scale implementation of the manufacturing process, the cultivation of annual mugwort in Vietnam and the financing of the start-up. According to the first CEO Dirk Pohlmann, the company was hoping for support from the Bill and Melinda Gates Foundation. The latter supported competing products from the Sanofi company made from genetically modified yeast. According to Pohlmann's account, the foundation's monopoly position in funding the international fight against malaria made it difficult for ArtemiFlow to gain a foothold. In addition, simply announcing synthetic production dropped prices for producers, so less artemisinin was expected to be produced.

ArtemiFlow partnered with the University of Kentucky in 2018. Researchers at the university grew Artemisia annua, which fights malaria, as part of the partnership. Artemiflow developed a reactor for novel artemisinin production and developed higher-yielding plants in Kentucky in collaboration with the university.

The new chemical production process is the first example of how not only the starting materials for making a drug or natural product are derived from plants. The catalyst, the tool that drives the reaction, also comes directly from plants.

In 2020, the university and Artemiflow partnered on a clinical study to test the plant and its anti-cancer effects.

For developing the new process, Seeberger, Kerry Gilmore, and Andreas Seidel-Morgenstern were awarded the 2021 Science Prize for "Affordable Green Chemistry" by the American Chemical Society.

== COVID-19 ==
Production on the potential use of artemisin against COVID-19 was controversial, in part because of possible conflicts of interest owing to Seeberger's leadership of ArtemiLife. The critical article in the SZ was answered by an article in the German magazine Focus.
