= Puget Sound Navy Museum =

Naval museum in Bremerton, Washington

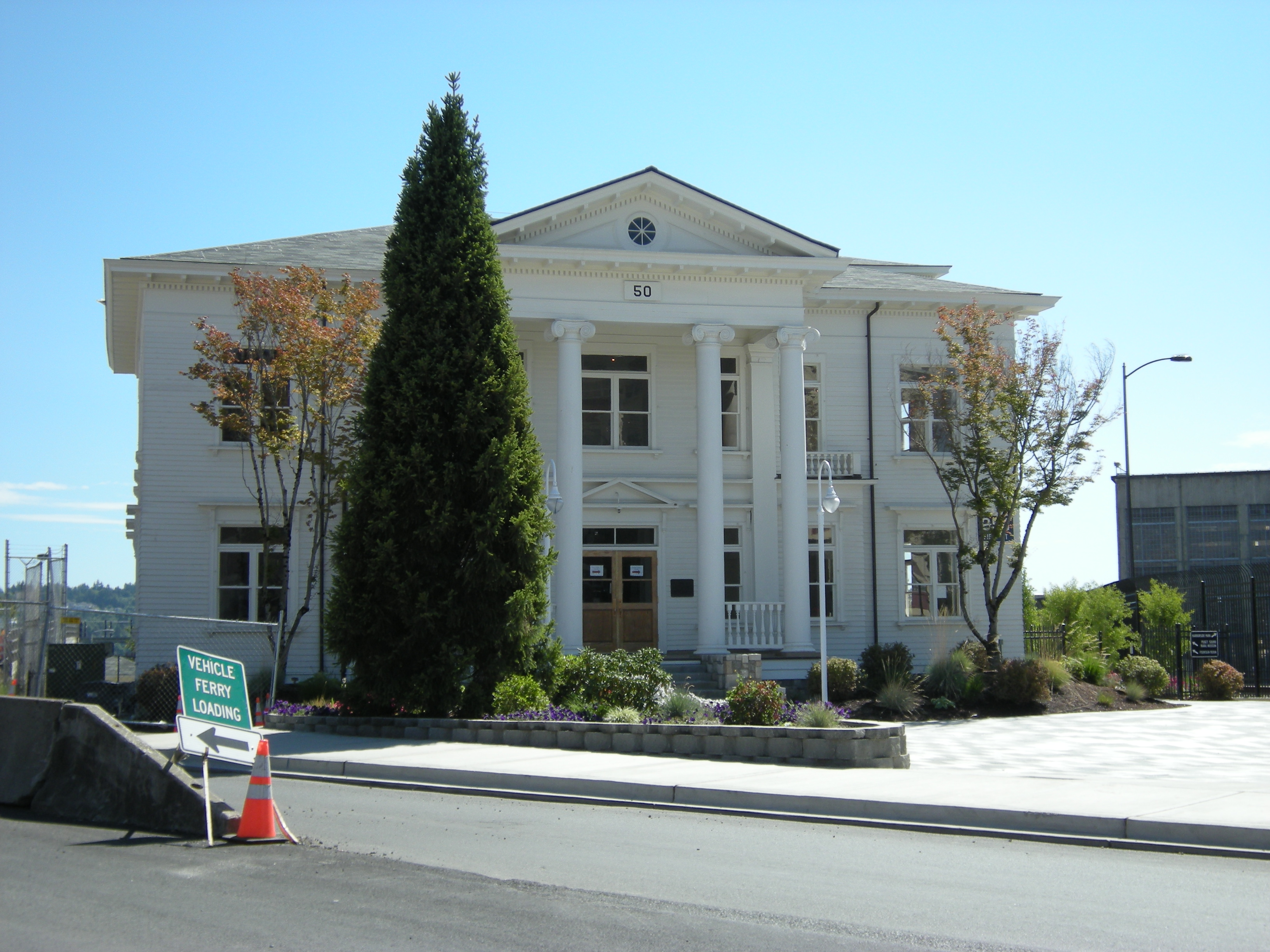
- Established: 2007
- Location: Bremerton, Washington
- Type: U.S. Navy
- Website: Puget Sound Navy Museum

The Puget Sound Navy Museum is an official naval museum located in Bremerton, Washington, United States. The museum is one of the 10 Navy museums that are operated by the Naval History & Heritage Command. It is located near the Washington State Ferries terminal, the Puget Sound Naval Shipyard, and the Bremerton Annex of Naval Base Kitsap. According to the museum website, its mission is "collecting, preserving, and interpreting the naval heritage of the Pacific Northwest for the benefit of the U.S. Navy and general public."

== Collections ==
The naval history of the region is explored through a series of exhibits about the Puget Sound Naval Shipyard. There's a section devoted towards the aircraft carrier USS John C. Stennis. Outside the museum, the sail of the Sturgeon-class USS Parche is on display. The museum offers a gift shop, research library, and children's area.

== History ==
The Puget Sound Navy Museum held a ribbon-cutting ceremony to officially open the doors of the museum after being moved to its new location on the Bremerton waterfront. On August 24, 2007, the 111-year-old, historic Building 50 from the Puget Sound Naval Shipyard (PSNS) was moved and refurbished to house the museums’ exhibits. This was the museum's fifth move in 52 years of operation.
