= Christopher Drew (journalist) =

American journalist

- Born: New Orleans, Louisiana
- Education: Tulane University
- Occupations: Investigative journalist Book author University professor
- Employer(s): The New York Times; Louisiana State University
- Spouse: Annette Lawrence Drew
- Awards: George Polk Award; White House Correspondents Award

Christopher Drew is an American investigative reporter who worked for The New York Times for 22 years, serving as assistant editor for the newspaper's investigative unit. Drew has also served on the faculties at university schools of journalism, teaching investigative journalism. He has written on topics such as U.S. Navy SEALs, submarine espionage, and presidential campaigning, among others, and has received multiple awards for his reporting. Drew's book "Blind Man's Bluff: The Untold Story of American Submarine Espionage" about Cold War submarine warfare, published in 1998, was a best selling non-fiction book for approximately a year.

== Early life and education ==
Drew was born in New Orleans, Louisiana, to which he later returned to report on the Hurricane Katrina aftermath. He graduated from Jesuit High School in 1974. In college, Drew majored in English, graduating from Tulane University.

== Career ==
Early in his career, Drew worked as an investigative reporter for the New Orleans States-Item and then later for the New Orleans Times-Picayune, after the merger of the two newspapers. He then served as investigative journalist for the Chicago Tribune. In 1995, he moved to The New York Times, where he worked for 22 years. For various projects, Drew worked closely with journalist Dean Baquet who was also from New Orleans.

In 2016, Drew was a recipient of a George Polk Award for reporting on the activities of SEAL Team 6 as they relate to the killing of an Afghan citizen in 2012. He shared the award with journalists Nicholas Kulish, Mark Mazzetti, Matthew Rosenberg, Serge F. Kovaleski, Sean D. Naylor, and John Ismay. In this investigation, Drew spent two years in Afghanistan with two co-authors investigating the role of the U.S. Navy SEALs.

Drew reported from Washington D.C. for ten years, twice winning White House Correspondents' Association awards for national reportage. He covered presidential candidate Barack Obama in 2008.

His book Blind Man's Bluff: The Untold Story of American Submarine Espionage, published by PublicAffairs, and co-authored with Sherry Sontag and Annette Lawrence Drew, won an Investigative Reporters and Editors (IRE) certificate award in 1998. The Chicago Tribune team used Freedom of Information Act requests and examined formerly secret and dangerous submarine military actions. The book also won the Theodore and Franklin D. Roosevelt Prize in Naval History prize for the best book on American naval history published in 1998.

In 1996, he covered the Odwalla E. coli outbreak, finding that the Odwalla firm had relaxed its quality standards for incoming fruit and curbed the authority of its own safety program

For the Chicago Tribune, he wrote a series of articles in 1988 on the topic of "Cutting Corners in the Slaughterhouse".

=== Academia ===
While working as an investigative reporter in New York, Drew also served as an adjunct professor at the Columbia University Graduate School of Journalism, a position he held for ten years. In 2017, Drew left The New York Times to become a professor at the Manship School of Mass Communication at Louisiana State University (LSU).

At LSU, Drew is a professional-in-residence and holds the Fred Jones Greer Jr. Endowed Chair professorship in the School of Journalism. In that role, Drew continues his work in investigative journalism by leading the school's efforts on reporting on the activities of the Louisiana state legislature and also working on cold cases related to unsolved Civil Rights-era crimes.

== Personal life ==
External media
- Media links about Christopher Drew

Images
- Photograph of Drew, from Louisiana State University

Audio
- Interview with Drew about the Hurricane Katrina aftermath, on NPR's Fresh Air.

Video
- Drew in the History Channel documentary based on the book "Blind Man's Bluff"

Drew is married to political scientist Annette Lawrence Drew who served as a researcher for the book "Blind Man's Bluff".

== Books ==
- Sontag, Sherry; Drew, Christopher; Drew, Annette Lawrence. Blind Man's Bluff: The Untold Story of American Submarine Espionage. Harper Collins Publishers, 1998, ISBN 1891620088.
- Ballard, Robert D.; Drew, Christopher. Into the Deep: A Memoir from the Man Who Found Titanic. National Geographic, 2021, ISBN 1426220995.
