= USS Parche (SSN-683) =

Submarine of the United States

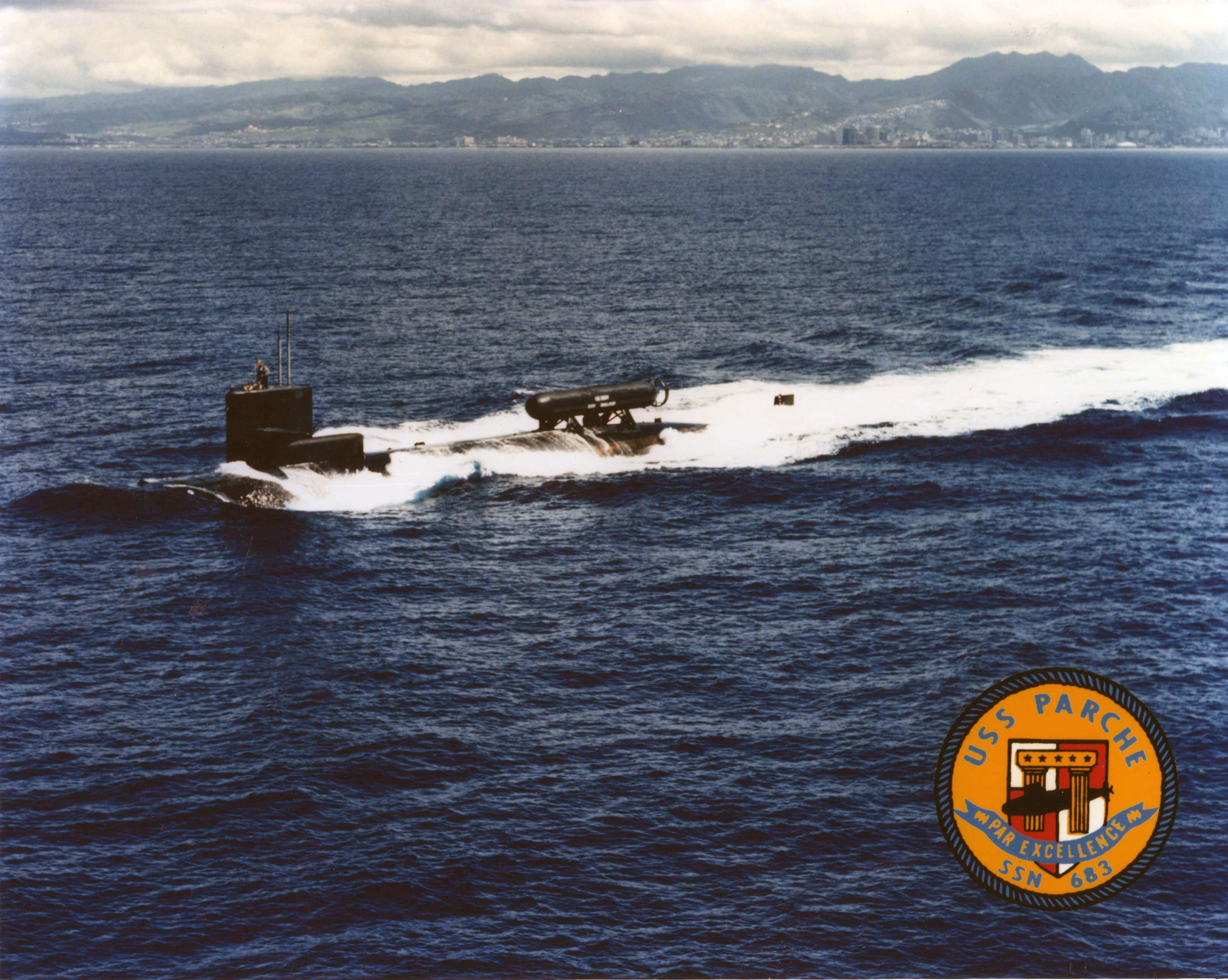
- USS Parche (SSN-683) off Pearl Harbor, Hawaii, sometime prior to October 1985. The structure on the after part of her casing is a permanently attached swimmer lock-out chamber, although described under its naval cover as Deep Submergence Rescue Vehicle. Her ship's insignia is at lower right.

History

United States
- Name: Parche
- Namesake: The parche, a type of butterfly fish
- Ordered: 25 June 1968
- Builder: Ingalls Shipbuilding, Pascagoula, Mississippi
- Laid down: 10 December 1970
- Launched: 13 January 1973
- Sponsored by: Natalie Beshany
- Commissioned: 17 August 1974
- Decommissioned: 19 October 2004
- Stricken: 18 July 2005
- Motto: Par Excellence (Preeminent)
- Honors and awards: 9 Presidential Unit Citations; 10 Navy Unit Commendations; 13 Navy Expeditionary Medals
- Fate: Scrapping via Ship and Submarine Recycling Program completed 30 November 2006
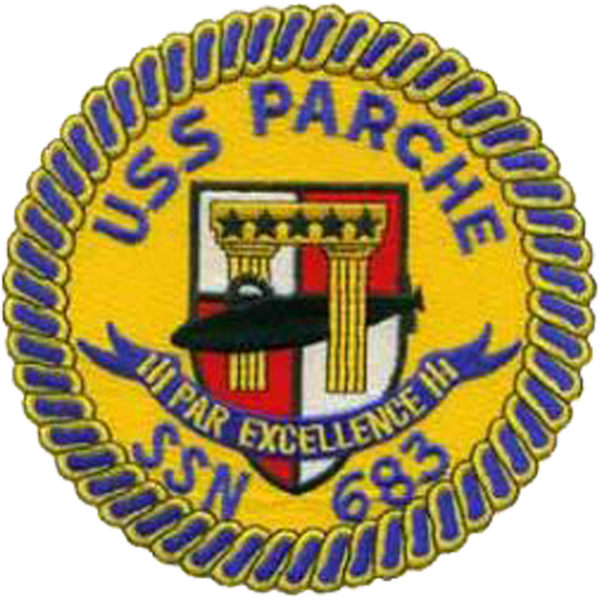
- Badge

General characteristics
- Class & type: Sturgeon-class attack submarine
- Displacement: As built: 3,978 long tons (4,042 t) light; 4,270 long tons (4,339 t) full; 292 long tons (297 t) dead
- Length: As built: 302 ft 3 in (92.13 m); After 1987–1991 lengthening: 401 ft (122 m)
- Beam: 31 ft 8 in (9.65 m)
- Draft: 28 ft 8 in (8.74 m)
- Installed power: 15,000 shaft horsepower (11.2 megawatts)
- Propulsion: One S5W nuclear reactor, two steam turbines, one screw
- Speed: 15 knots (28 km/h; 17 mph) surfaced; 25 knots (46 km/h; 29 mph) submerged
- Test depth: 1,300 feet (396 meters)
- Complement: As built: 112 (14 officers, 98 enlisted men); After 1987–1991 modifications: 179 (22 officers, 157 enlisted men)
- Armament: 4 × 21-inch (533 mm) torpedo tubes

USS Parche (SSN-683), a Sturgeon-class submarine, was the second ship of the United States Navy to be named for the parche /ˌpɑːrˈtʃeɪ/, a small, coral reef butterfly fish. Parche was launched on 13 January 1973, sponsored by Natalie Beshany, the wife of Vice Admiral Philip A. Beshany, and commissioned on 17 August 1974.

Attributed as being a key resource of the National Underwater Reconnaissance Office, Parche is said to be "the most highly decorated vessel in U.S. history."

== Operational history ==
=== 1974–1979 ===
Parche served as a unit of the United States Atlantic Fleet Submarine Force from 1974 until 1976, before transferring to the United States Pacific Fleet in October 1976. Once arriving at her new home port at Mare Island Naval Shipyard in Vallejo, California, Parche received ocean engineering modifications. Parche deployed on a shakedown training cruise in August and September 1978.

=== Operation Ivy Bells, 1979 ===
In the book Blind Man's Bluff, it is claimed that Parche successfully tapped into Soviet underwater military communication cables in the Sea of Okhotsk as part of Operation Ivy Bells.

=== 1979–2004 ===
During her career, Parche was ostensibly involved in recovering Soviet missile fragments from the seabed following test launches. While missile fragments were indeed collected in large numbers, Parche's primary missions typically revolved around the setting and retrieving of wire taps placed on Soviet underwater communication cables. Much of her operational history was spent undertaking clandestine missions, and as of late 2009, a vast majority of the missions undertaken remain classified.

From 1987 to 1991, Parche underwent an extended refueling overhaul at Mare Island Naval Shipyard during which she was modified for research and development work. An extension measuring 100 feet (30 m) was added to her hull just forward of her sail. The added section was flat-topped (looking somewhat like the missile deck of a ballistic missile submarine) and provided the space required to support a larger crew and additional equipment. These additions included an extensive array of signals-intelligence-collecting antennas, electronic gear, and other navigational and ocean engineering equipment. The overhaul also added many auxiliary navigational and maneuvering features, including both upward and forward-facing short-range sonars, and a suite of armored spotlights and closed-circuit television cameras for under-ice operations.

Upon completion of her modifications in 1991, Parche began a new mission as part of Submarine Development Squadron 5. She resumed operations in the Pacific Fleet in 1992.

Parche was transferred to a new home port, Naval Base Kitsap at Bangor, Washington, in November 1994.

Parche may have recovered Chinese missile fragments. During the Third Taiwan Strait Crisis in 1995 and 1996, the People's Republic of China launched DF-21 and DF-15 ballistic missiles into the sea surrounding Taiwan to deter Taiwan from moving toward independence; Robert Karniol writes: "I suspect that "the Parche might have gone after these Chinese missile fragments", and "I suspect that Beijing gave away some useful missile secrets."

== Decommissioning and disposal ==
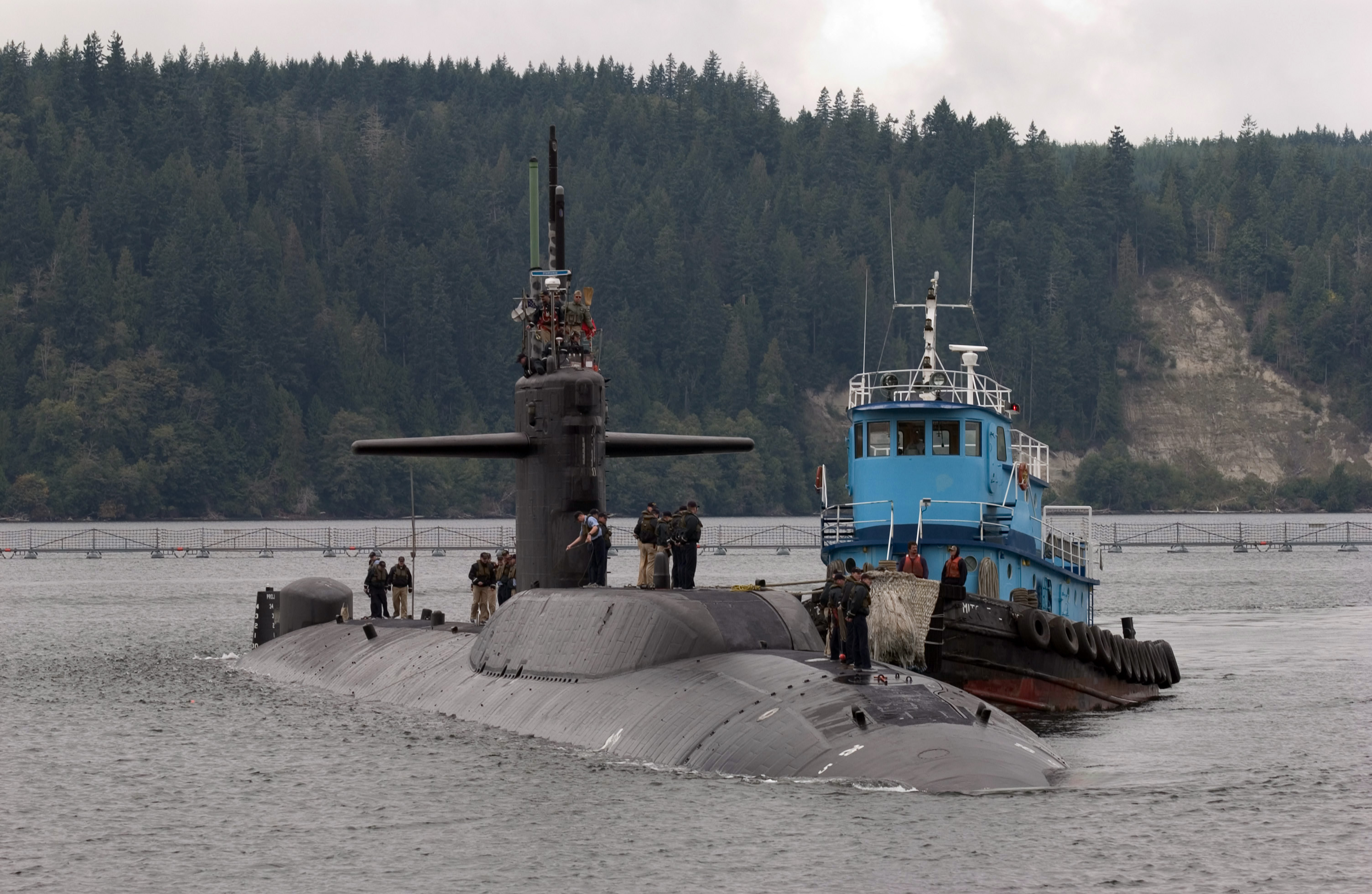
Parche returns to port for the last time, displaying an upside down broom indicating a “clean sweep” or a successful mission at Naval Base Kitsap at Bangor, Washington, on 20 September 2004.

On 19 October 2004, a decommissioning ceremony took place at Puget Sound Naval Shipyard at Bremerton, Washington; she was officially decommissioned on 18 July 2005 and stricken from the Naval Vessel Register the same day. The wardroom of the oldest submarine in the fleet carries Richard O'Kane's personal cribbage board, and upon Parche's decommissioning the board was transferred to the next oldest boat: USS Los Angeles (SSN-688). Her scrapping at Puget Sound Naval Shipyard via the Ship and Submarine Recycling Program was completed on 30 November 2006. Much of her operational history was spent undertaking clandestine missions, and as of late 2009, a vast majority of the missions undertaken remain classified.

Parche's research and development duties were assumed by Jimmy Carter, a Seawolf-class submarine whose construction period was extended to include modifications that will allow her to carry out the same types of research and development. According to Robert Karniol, Jimmy Carter in succeeding Parche, has become "Washington's premier spy submarine."

== Military awards ==
As of 2007, Parche was said to be "the most highly decorated vessel in U.S. history", receiving a total of nine Presidential Unit Citations and ten Navy Unit Commendations. The submarine also received thirteen Navy Expeditionary Medals and thirteen awards of the Battle Efficiency Award during her thirty years of service.

== Commemoration ==
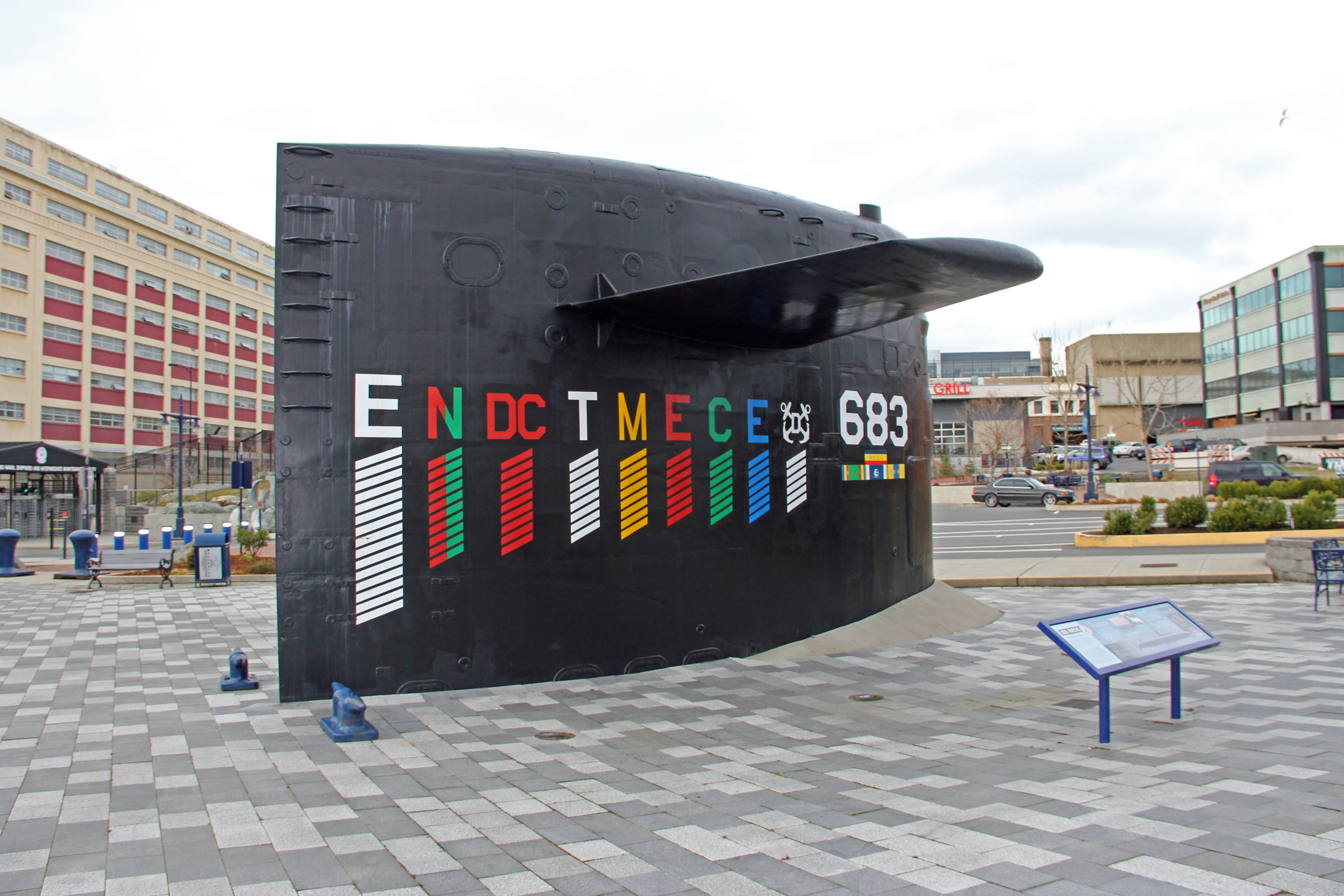
Parche's sail in the downtown waterfront park at Bremerton, Washington.^{(discuss)}

Parche's sail was preserved. It was moved from Puget Sound Naval Shipyard to the maritime park near Puget Sound Navy Museum in downtown Bremerton. The sail is decorated with stripes for the unit awards and ribbons:

E	N	DC	T	M	E	C	E	[Crossed Anchors]	683		
Battle Efficiency (14)	Navigation Excellence (10)	Damage Control Excellence (9)	Tactical Proficiency Excellence, submarines (8)	Medical Department (8)	Engineering and Damage Control Excellence (7)	Communications Excellence (7)	Supply Excellence (7)	Deck Seamanship Excellence (6)	Presidential Unit Citation (9)		
Battle Efficiency (14)	Navigation Excellence (10)	Damage Control Excellence (9)	Tactical Proficiency Excellence, submarines (8)	Medical Department (8)	Engineering and Damage Control Excellence (7)	Communications Excellence (7)	Supply Excellence (7)	Deck Seamanship Excellence (6)	Navy Unit Commendation (10)	Navy Battle "E" (15)	Navy Expeditionary Medal (13)
