= Operation Ivy Bells =

Covert mission

Coordinates: 57.6°N 155.7°E

Location of the Ivy Bells cable tap, off the Kamchatka Peninsula

Operation Ivy Bells was a 1971 joint United States Navy, Central Intelligence Agency (CIA), and National Security Agency (NSA) mission whose objective was to place wire taps on Soviet underwater communication lines during the Cold War.

The operation was discovered by the Soviet Union in 1980, when NSA analyst Ronald Pelton defected and revealed the existence of the program.

== Background ==
During the Cold War, the United States wanted to learn more about Soviet submarine and missile technology, specifically ICBM test and nuclear first strike capability.

In the early 1970s the U.S. government learned of the existence of an undersea communications cable in the Sea of Okhotsk, which connected the major Soviet Pacific Fleet naval base at Petropavlovsk on the Kamchatka Peninsula to the Soviet Pacific Fleet's mainland headquarters at Vladivostok. At the time, the Sea of Okhotsk was claimed by the Soviet Union as territorial waters, and was strictly off limits to foreign vessels, and the Soviet Navy had installed a network of sound detection devices along the seabed to detect intruders. The area also saw numerous surface and subsurface naval exercises.

== Installation ==
Despite these obstacles, the potential for an intelligence coup was considered too great to ignore, and in October 1971, the United States sent the purpose-modified submarine USS Halibut deep into the Sea of Okhotsk. Funds for the project were diverted secretly from the deep-submergence rescue vehicle (DSRV) program, and the modified submarines were shown with fake DSRV simulators attached to them. These were early diver lockouts. US Navy Divers working from Halibut found the cable in 400 feet (120 m) of water and installed a 20-foot (6.1 m) long device, which wrapped around the cable without piercing its casing and recorded all communications made over it. The large recording device was designed to detach if the cable was raised for repair.

The tapping of the Soviet naval cable was so secret that most sailors involved did not have the security clearance needed to know about it. A cover story was thus created to disguise the actual mission: it was claimed that the spy submarines were sent to the Soviet naval range in the Sea of Okhotsk to recover the Soviet SS-N-12 Sandbox supersonic anti-ship missile (AShM) debris so that countermeasures could be developed.

Although created as a cover story, this mission was actually carried out with great success: U.S. Navy divers recovered all of the SS-N-12 debris, with the largest debris no larger than six inches (150 mm), and a total of more than two million pieces. The debris was taken to the U.S. and reconstructed at the U.S. Naval Research Laboratory. Based on these pieces, at least one sample was reverse engineered. It was discovered that the SS-N-12 AShM was guided by radar only, and the infrared guidance previously suspected did not exist.

== Use ==
Each month, divers retrieved the recordings and installed a new set of tapes. The recordings were then delivered to the NSA for processing and dissemination to other U.S. intelligence agencies. The first tapes recorded revealed that the Soviets were so sure of the cable's security that the majority of the conversations made over it were unencrypted. The eavesdropping on the traffic between senior Soviet officers provided invaluable information on naval operations at Petropavlovsk, the Pacific Fleet's primary nuclear submarine base, home to Yankee and Delta class nuclear-powered ballistic missile submarines.

Eventually, more taps were installed on Soviet lines in other parts of the world, with more advanced instruments built by AT&T's Bell Laboratories that were radioisotope thermoelectric generator-powered and could store a year's worth of data. Other submarines were used for this role, including USS Parche (SSN-683), USS Richard B. Russell (SSN-687), and USS Seawolf (SSN-575). Seawolf was almost lost during one of these missions—she was stranded on the bottom after a storm and almost had to use her self-destruct charges to scuttle the ship with her crew.

== Compromise ==
This operation was compromised by Ronald Pelton, a 44-year-old veteran of the NSA, who was fluent in Russian. At the time, Pelton was $65,000 ($254,000 today) in debt, and had filed for personal bankruptcy just three months before he resigned. With only a few hundred dollars in the bank, Pelton walked into the Soviet embassy in Washington, D.C. in January 1980, and offered to sell what he knew to the KGB for money.

No documents were passed from Pelton to the Soviets, as he had an extremely good memory: he reportedly received $35,000 from the KGB for the intelligence he provided from 1980 to 1983, and for the intelligence on the Operation Ivy Bells, the KGB gave him $5,000. The Soviets did not immediately take any action on this information; however, in 1981, surveillance satellites showed Soviet warships, including a salvage vessel, anchored over the site of the tap in the Sea of Okhotsk. USS Parche (SSN-683) was dispatched to recover the device, but the American divers were unable to find it and it was concluded that the Soviets had taken it. In July 1985, Vitaly Yurchenko, a KGB colonel who was Pelton's initial contact in Washington, D.C., defected to the United States and provided the information that eventually led to Pelton's arrest.

As of 1999, the recording device captured by the Soviets was on public display at the Great Patriotic War museum in Moscow.

== See also ==
- Espionage Act of 1917 - The law under which Pelton was prosecuted.
- NSA fiber-optic tapping
