= Blind Man's Bluff: The Untold Story of American Submarine Espionage =

Book about American submarine operations in the Cold War

- Author: Sherry Sontag; Christopher Drew; Annette Lawrence Drew
- Subject: Cold War submarine history
- Publisher: PublicAffairs
- Publication date: November 1998
- Publication place: United States
- Media type: Print (hardback · paperback)
- Pages: 352
- ISBN: 978-0-06-103004-8
- OCLC: 39498566

Blind Man's Bluff: The Untold Story of American Submarine Espionage (ISBN 0-06-103004-X) by Sherry Sontag, Christopher Drew, and Annette Lawrence Drew, published in 1998 by PublicAffairs, is a non-fiction book about U.S. Navy submarine operations during the Cold War. Several operations are described in the book, such as the use of USS Parche to tap Soviet undersea communications cables and USS Halibut to do the same in Operation Ivy Bells.

The book also contains an extensive list of collisions between Western and Soviet submarines and U.S. submarine awards.
