= Israel and the Bomb =

- Country of origin: Germany
- Original language: German

Production
- Producer: Florian Hartung und Dirk Pohlmann
- Running time: 54 minutes

Original release
- Network: Arte
- Release: 7 July 2012

Israel and the Bomb is a documentary film about nuclear weapons of Israel and policy of "nuclear ambiguity", produced and directed by Florian Hartung and Dirk Pohlmann, It was broadcast by ARTE on November 7, 2012.

== Interviews ==
Interviews include Avner Cohen (author of the book "Israel and the Bomb", 1999), Gideon Remez, Isabella Ginor (author of the book "Foxbats over Dimona"), journalist Peter Hounam, Martin van Creveld, Avi Primor.

The interviews were recorded from September 11 to November 5, 2011, in USA, Israel, Germany, Britain and France.

== Contents ==
By way of introduction, the film presents Avner Cohen's thesis of an Israeli "policy of opacity" ("עֲמִימוּת" amimut "ambiguity") on the basis of the case of Mordechai Vanunu. Vanunu violated Israel's taboo against talking about the country's nuclear weapons by disclosing material about Israel's secret nuclear weapons program to the Sunday Times, and was sentenced to 18 years in prison for espionage and treason. Officially, Israel denies to this day that it possesses nuclear weapons and, on this basis, does not consider itself obligated to join the Nuclear Non-Proliferation Treaty.

The film reconstructs the genesis of Israel's nuclear weapons program from the experience of the Jews in World War II. The Holocaust and the passive attitude of the Allies, who did not want to wage a war to save European Jews from the Holocaust, had led to the conclusion that in case of emergency only Jews would stand up for the security of the Jewish people. Accordingly, deterrence by means of its own nuclear weapons had become the goal of Israel's policy for security reasons. This goal was pursued with all necessary means, fair and foul.

According to military historian Martin van Creveld, until the Kennedy administration the United States had deliberately ignored the nuclear program and assumed that Israel would keep its nuclear program secret. Kennedy, however, was no longer willing to tolerate an Israeli nuclear weapons program and the accompanying danger that other states might obtain the necessary know-how to build nuclear weapons. Thus, he said, U.S. policy had changed dramatically.

Before the first Israeli nuclear bomb was ready in 1967, on the eve of the Six-Day War, the Soviet Union, which was primarily concerned with preventing an Israeli bomb, and the Arab states had allied themselves. However, no one had expected the success of the Israeli preemptive attack on the Arab air force, so that the Soviet Union ultimately remained passive in the war. Then, in 1969, a secret agreement had been reached between Golda Meir and Richard Nixon in which the United States allowed Israel to be a nuclear power.

When Saddam Hussein bombed Israel with Scud missiles in 1991 in revenge for the attacks on Iraq, Israeli politicians used this as an opportunity to put Germany under moral pressure. The success of the strategy had been the delivery of three German submarines to Israel, of which only half a submarine had to be paid for. The submarines were immediately armed with nuclear cruise missiles. Avi Primor describes that despite all knowledge about Israeli nuclear bombs, the respective German governments always pretended that they did not exist.

The film claims that the Israeli nuclear weapons were also tabooed in Germany. The politician Karsten Voigt, who was foreign policy spokesman for the SPD at the time, states that the worst thing would have been to ask Israel and get an honest answer there - which is why the questions were not asked. Nevertheless, it was clear to every politician involved in the matter that the German delivery would immediately be used by Israel for nuclear armament purposes, yet this was a point that no one wanted to think about in more detail.

The film ends with the thesis of the filmmakers that Israel is one of the largest nuclear powers, that it can attack targets worldwide, that it has obliged its citizens to remain silent, and that it thus withdraws its nuclear armament program from democratic control.
