= Torsö =

Island in Sweden

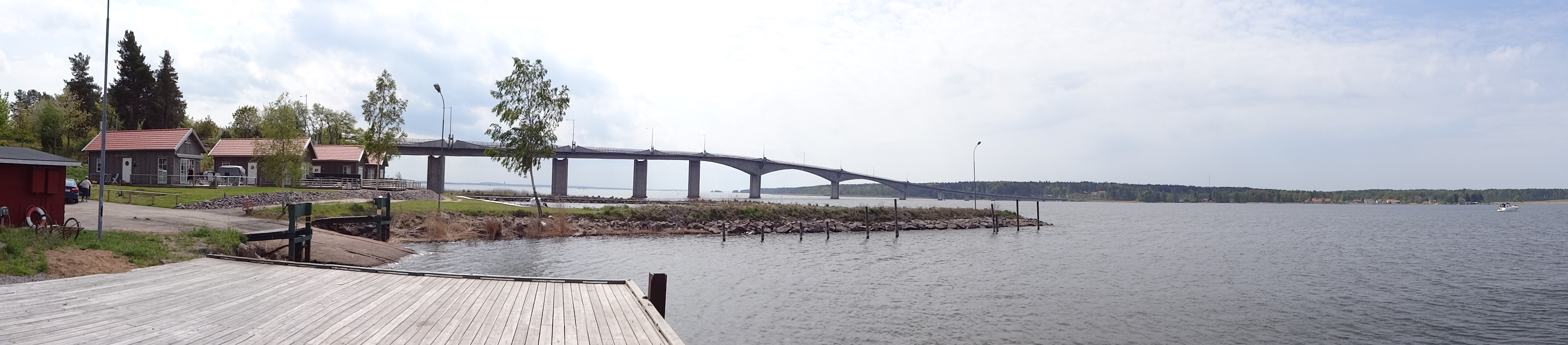
- The bridge from the east side of Lake Vänern to Torsö
- Interactive map of Torsö

Geography
- Location: Vänern
- Coordinates: 58°48′06″N 13°49′34″E
- Area: 62.03 km^{2} (23.95 sq mi)

Administration
- Sweden
- County: Västra Götaland
- Municipality: Mariestad

Torsö (Thor's Island) is the biggest island of Sweden's lake Vänern, area 62.03 km^{2}. Torsö is located in Mariestad Municipality. Torsö formerly consisted of two islands (Torsö and Fågelö), but around 1930 the water in between was pumped out, and the former lakebed is now used for growing crops.

Torsö has around 550 families living year round, and around thrice that number during summers. In 1994 a bridge, "Torsöbron", was opened between the mainland and the island. It is around 900 m long.

Due to the size of lake Vänern, the island has a more maritime climate (with milder winters) and more sun hours compared to the mainland.
