= Yves Lacoste =

French geographer and geopolitician (1929–2026)

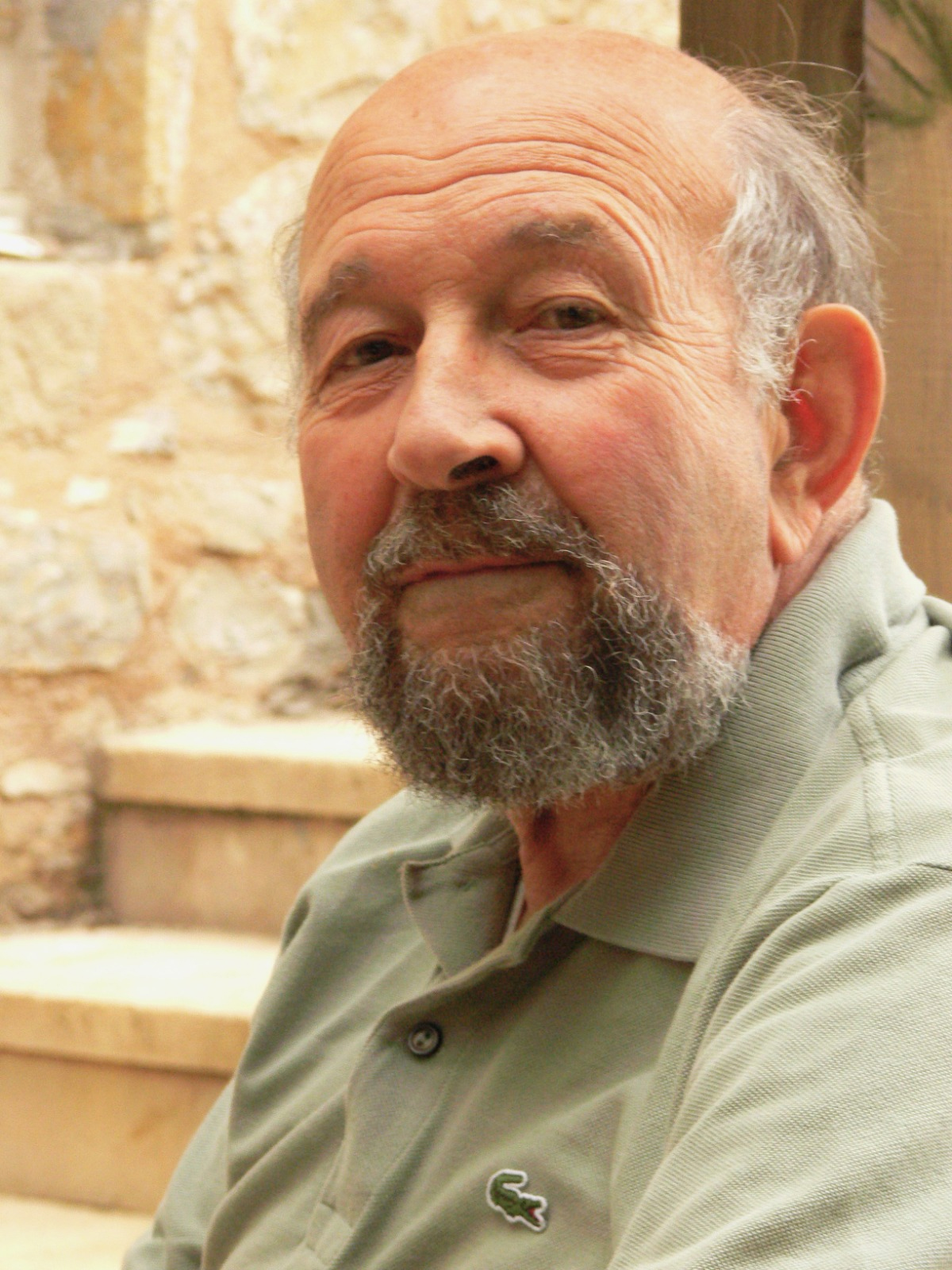
- Lacoste in 2007
- Born: 7 September 1929; Fez, French protectorate in Morocco
- Died: 20 June 2026 (aged 96); Bourg-la-Reine, Hauts-de Seine, France
- Known for: Forensic analysis of the US bombing campaign of the Red River Delta
- Scientific career
- Workplaces: University of Paris 8
- Thesis: Transformational Analysis (1955)

Yves Lacoste (7 September 1929 – 20 June 2026) was a French geographer known for his political commitment and contributions to geopolitics. Born in Fez, Morocco, the son of a geologist, Jean Lacoste, and a librarian, he spent his childhood in the city of Rabat before continuing his secondary education at the Lycée Lakanal in Sceaux (Seine) and his higher education at the Sorbonne.

After obtaining his post-graduate diploma on the geomorphology of the Rharb plain in Morocco, Lacoste passed the agrégation in geography in 1952. He began his teaching career at the Lycée Bugeaud in Algiers. A member of the French Communist Party and the Algerian Communist Party, he became actively involved in anti-colonial struggles.

In 1955, forced to return to France by the principal of Lycée Bugeaud, Lacoste left the PCF in disagreement with its policy in Algeria. He became a member of the executive board of the Committee for the Independence of Europe. Parallel to his political activities, he continued his research in geography, notably on underdevelopment and the history of the Maghreb. As an assistant at the Institut de Géographie de Paris, Lacoste published several authoritative textbooks.

In 1979, he obtained his doctorate with the thesis Unity and Diversity of the Third World.

In 1989, he founded the Centre de recherches et d'analyses de géopolitiques, now the Institut français de géopolitique. Lacoste was notable for his innovative approaches to geography, integrating natural and political constraints into his analyses. He also published the journal Hérodote.

Internationally recognized, he was awarded the Vautrin Lud Prize in 2000 for his contribution to geography. Throughout his career, Lacoste continued to teach and appear in the media on geopolitical issues.

Close to socialism, he expressed critical views on the Islamist movement and defended secularism.

== Life and career ==
In 1976 he established the French geopolitical journal Hérodote and published a work that shook the French academy, La Géographie ça sert d'abord à faire la guerre. Its central thesis was that "geography was a form of strategic and political knowledge, central to the military strategy and the exercise of political power". Lacoste had earlier earned international renown in 1972 during the Vietnam War by publishing a spatial forensics analysis of the US bombing campaign of the Red River Delta. He agreed with claims from the North Vietnamese government that the US was deliberately targeting the hydrological infrastructure of the river in an attempt to trigger flooding and cause mass civilian casualties, which it called a war crime.

He was co-editor of Hérodote with Beatrice Giblin and the head of the French Institute of Geopolitics (Institut Français de Géopolitique) at the University of Paris VIII.

Lacoste died at his home in Bourg-la-Reine, Hauts-de-Seine, on 20 June 2026, at the age of 96.

== Understanding of geopolitics ==
Lacoste played a key role in reviving the word geopolitics in the French and English languages. The word had been tarnished by its association with the Nazi régime because of German geopolitician Karl Haushofer. Focussing on spatial dimensions of political affairs Lacoste defines geopolitics as the study of power rivalries over territory carried out on different levels of analysis: global, continental, national, regional or even local.

In an earlier work, La Géographie du sous-développement, Lacoste had suggested a spatial explanation of underdevelopment.

== Writings ==
- Les Pays sous-développés (1959)
- Géographie du sous-développement (1965)
- Ibn Khaldoun - Naissance de l'histoire du Tiers-Monde (1965)
- La Géographie ça sert d'abord à faire la guerre (1976) ISBN 2-7071-0815-4
- Contre les anti-tiersmondistes et contre certains tiersmondistes (1985)
- Géopolitique des régions françaises (1986)
  - vol 1: La France septentrionale
  - vol 2: La Façade atlantique
  - vol 3: La France du sud-est
- Dictionnaire de Géopolitique (1993) ISBN 2-08-035101-X
- Dictionnaire géopolitique des États (1994) ISBN 2-08-035104-4
- La Légende de la terre (1996) ISBN 2-08-035446-9
- Vive la Nation - Destin d'une idée géopolitique (1998) ISBN 2-213-59613-1
- L'Eau des hommes (2002) ISBN 2-7022-0628-X
- De la Géopolitique aux Paysages. Dictionnaire de la Géographie (2003) ISBN 2-200-26538-7
- Maghreb, peuple et civilisation (2004) ISBN 2-7071-4432-0
- Géopolitique. La longue histoire d'aujourd'hui (2006) ISBN 2-03-505421-4
- L'Eau dans le monde : les batailles pour la vie (2006) ISBN 2-03-582578-4
- Géopolitique de la Méditerranée (2006) ISBN 2-200-26840-8
