= Homer Lea =

American author (1876–1912)

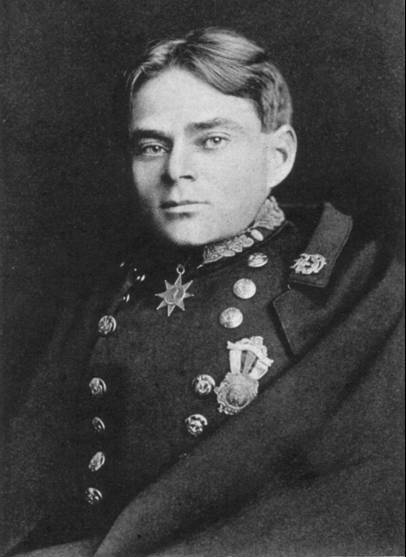
- Lea in 1909
- Born: November 17, 1876; Denver, Colorado, U.S.
- Died: November 1, 1912 (aged 35); Santa Monica, California, U.S.
- Resting place: Beitou District, Taipei, Taiwan
- Education: Stanford University
- Spouse: Ethel Lynn Bryant Lea (1875–1934)

Homer Lea (November 17, 1876 – November 1, 1912) was an American author of works on geopolitics who became a military advisor and general in the army of Sun Yat-sen.

== Early life ==
Born in Denver, Colorado, to Alfred E. (b.1845) and Hersa A. (1846–1879; née Coberly) Lea, his father served with the 3rd Colorado Cavalry during the Civil War. His mother died before his third birthday on May 13, 1879. Alfred is listed in the Jackson County, Missouri 1850 census, Washington Township, with the entire family being born in Tennessee. His mother was the widow of Silas Soule, who was a Captain in the Union army that refused to participate in the Sand Creek Massacre.

Homer was born healthy, but after suffering a drop to a hearthstone as a baby, he became a hunchback, standing only 4 ft 11 in (1.50 m) with a weight under 100 lb (45 kg). He attended East High School (Denver) and Los Angeles High School and accompanied friends on camping trips in the San Bernardino Mountains, in spite of his physical hindrances. Lea aspired to be a great soldier and somehow managed to get an appointment to West Point, though he was soon dismissed for health reasons. He was later admitted to Stanford University, where in addition to military history and politics, he became enamored with China and Chinese culture.

== China ==
At 23, with the Boxer Rebellion underway in China, Lea travelled to the Far East and offered his services to Kang Youwei, a former prime minister of China who was attempting to restore power to the confined Guangxu Emperor. Lea convinced Kang to make him a lieutenant general and give him command of a small volunteer force. Lea's first command was not very successful as Kang's power and support was rapidly destroyed, but he did make it to Beijing in time to ride through the city with the international force that liberated it from the Boxers. Lea offered pursuit of the retreating Imperial Army, but his rag-tag soldiers were no match for the Imperial forces and he was repulsed. Without any support after Kang's fall, Lea fled to Hong Kong and then Japan, where he met Sun Yat-sen.

Sun was intrigued by the diminutive foreigner and saw his natural flair and western background could be useful in building support for the republican movement. He therefore dispatched Lea along with Prince Ch'i-ch'ao to the United States to raise funds. Lea returned to China in 1904 at the head of the Second Army Division, but this military campaign was unsuccessful and he was forced to return to the United States for health reasons.

== Works ==
Once in the U.S., Homer Lea was instrumental in training Qing's New Army, using American soldiers as instructors. Lea was also an author of two works on geopolitics: The Valor of Ignorance predicted the rise of Japanese militarist aggression and a Japanese colonial empire in the Pacific, while The Day of the Saxon, commissioned by British Field Marshal Lord Frederick Roberts, predicted the rise of a greater German Reich based on national supremacy and ethnic purity. Neither of these books sold particularly well in America, but The Valor of Ignorance sold 84,000 copies in Japan and impressed both General Adna Chaffee and General Douglas MacArthur, who tried unsuccessfully to make it compulsory reading at West Point. Japanese officers studied The Valor of Ignorance avidly and put its deadly lessons into practice in 1941. The Day of the Saxon sold only 7,000 copies; but one was acquired by German general Karl Haushofer. The books both made accurate predictions about future events, but entrenched isolationists in America were not threatened by an obscure military theorist who didn't have much influence. His books remain little known today, though they were cult classics in the first half of the twentieth century. Some say his theories were not particularly revolutionary; other geopoliticians could also see the same forces converging, but the public did not want to hear about it and U.S. Military officers had actively derided it. Lea also planned to write a third book called The Swarming of the Slav predicting a Russian move to dominate Europe, but he died before he could complete it.

== Late life and death ==
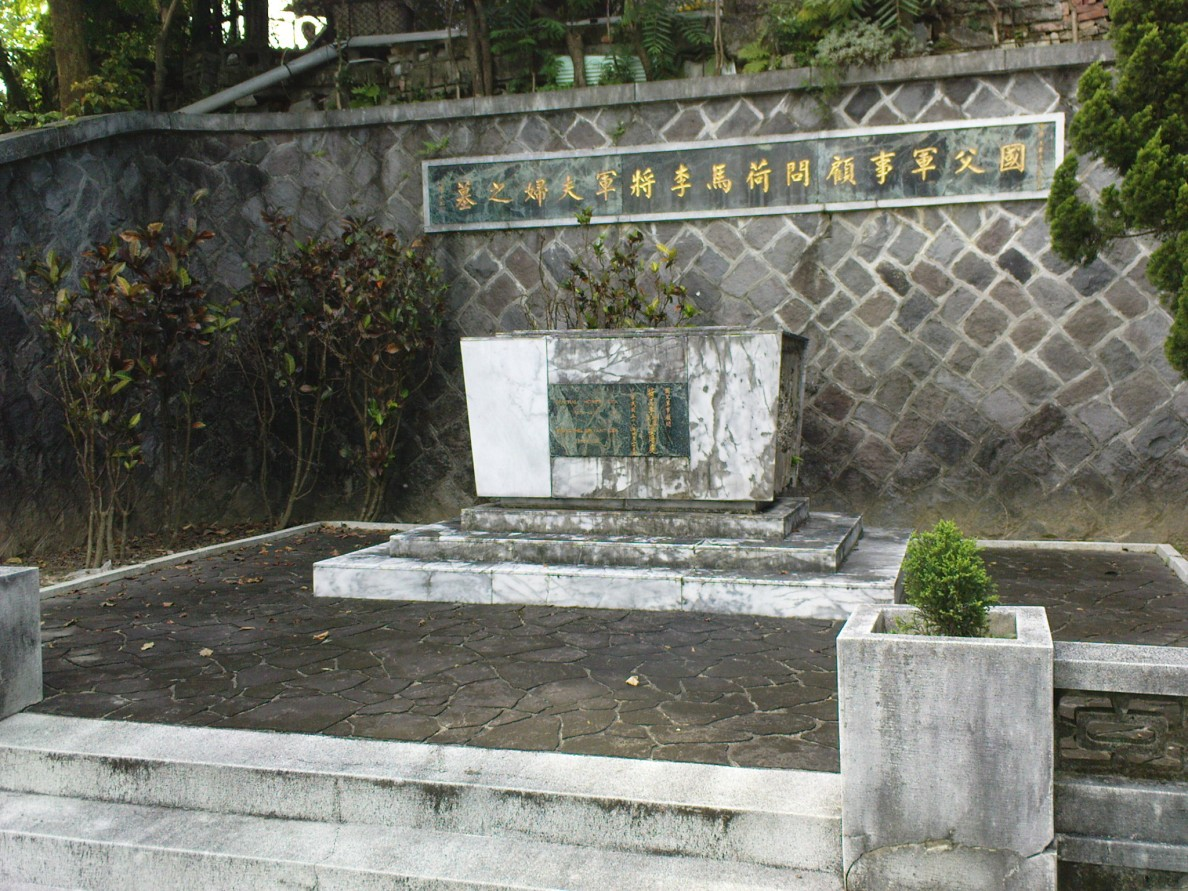
Homer Lea's grave

When Sun Yat-sen made China a republic in 1911–1912 he made Lea a full general and his chief of staff. A stroke several months later forced Lea to give up his new positions — his already-frail health had been further tried by several bouts of illness — and retire to the United States, where he died at age 35 in Ocean Park, California.

In April 1969, his ashes and those of his wife Ethel (née Bryant) were re-interred at Yangmingshan No.1 Public Cemetery, in the Beitou District of Taipei, Taiwan.

== See also ==
- Cordwainer Smith

== Bibliography ==
=== Works by ===
- 1908: The Vermilion Pencil: A Romance of China. - New York: McClure. - 30756368

Reprinted 2003. - Stirling: Read Around Asia. - ISBN 9780954545000

- 1909: The Valour of Ignorance. - London, New York: Harper and Brothers. - 1178360

Reprinted 1942. - ISBN 1931541663

- 1912: The Day of the Saxon. - Harper and Brothers. - 250316

Reprinted 1942. ISBN 1932512020

=== Works about ===
- Anschel, Eugene, (1984). - Homer Lea, Sun Yat-Sen, and the Chinese Revolution. - Praeger Pubs. ISBN 0030000637
- Alexander, Tom, (July, 1993). - "The Amazing Prophecies of 'General' Homer Lea". - Smithsonian. - p. 102.
- Kaplan, Lawrence (Sept. 15, 2010). - "Homer Lea: American Soldier of Fortune (American Warriors Series)". - The University Press of Kentucky. - ISBN 0813126169
