= Otto Maull =

Otto Maull (8 May 1887 – 16 December 1957) was a German geographer and geopolitician. He taught human geography at University of Graz, in Austria, and was the author of several books, including ("Political geography" 1925, "Introduction in to geopolitics", 1928, etc.). He spent time in Latin America, about which he wrote extensively in a series of papers. He was a co-founder and co-editor of Zeitschrift, and subscribed to the theory of the organic state as a collection of spatial cells (regions, cities etc.), each with a life of its own. Maull was at one time part of a team led by former military commander and political geographer Karl Haushofer. Haushofer was a close associate of Rudolf Hess and called for Nazi Germany, the Soviet Union and Japan to form a Eurasian panregion.
