= Albrecht Haushofer =

German geographer and diplomat

Albrecht Haushofer

Albrecht Georg Haushofer (7 January 1903 – 23 April 1945) was a German geographer, diplomat, author and member of the German Resistance to Nazism.

== Life ==
Haushofer was born in Munich, the son of the retired World War I general and geographer Karl Haushofer (1869–1946) and his wife Martha, née Mayer-Doss (1877–1946). Albrecht had one brother, Heinz. He studied geography and history at the Ludwig-Maximilians-Universität München. In 1924, he graduated with his thesis Paß-Staaten in den Alpen, Erich von Drygalski (1865–1949) was his supervisor. Haushofer then worked as an assistant for Albrecht Penck.

A fellow student in geopolitics was Rudolf Hess, a very early follower of Adolf Hitler and close friend of Haushofer's father, Karl. Karl Haushofer was a frequent visitor to Landsberg Prison, where Hitler and Hess were jailed after the failed 1923 Beer Hall Putsch and Mein Kampf was written. Later, under the Nuremberg Laws of 1935 (effective from 1936), Albrecht Haushofer was categorized as a Mischling. However, Hess, Deputy Führer since 1933, succeeded in having Haushofer issued a German Blood Certificate.

Albrecht Haushofer was made secretary general of the Gesellschaft für Erdkunde geographical society in Berlin and the editor of its periodical. He held this position from 1928 to 1938. Haushofer traveled the world in his official capacity, lecturing and gaining a wide experience of international affairs.

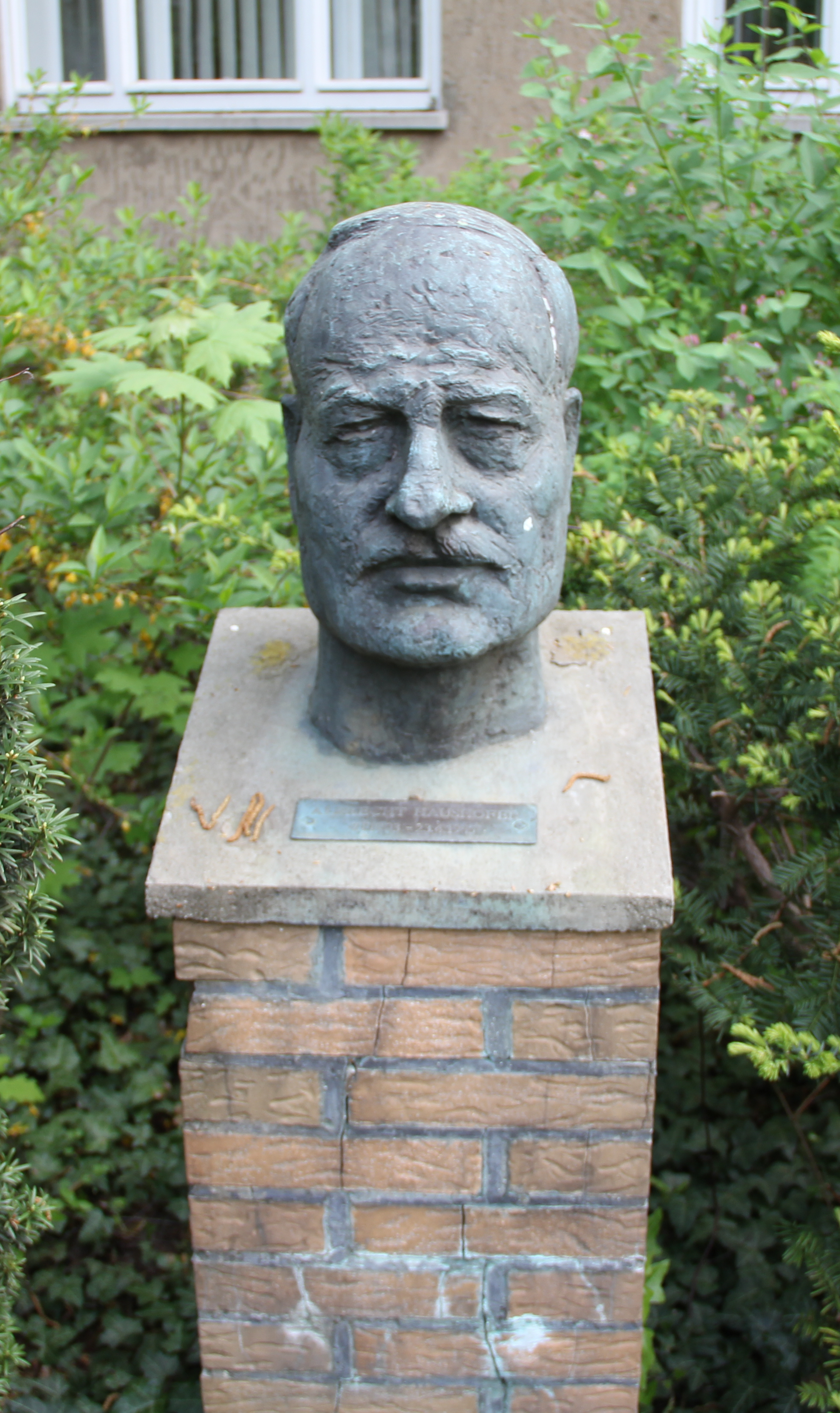
Memorial to Haushofer at Kurzebracker Weg 40, Berlin-Heiligensee.

He started teaching geopolitics at the Deutsche Hochschule für Politik (German Academy for Politics) in 1933, which had lost many of its teachers with the Nazi ascent to power. When the Academy was incorporated into the University of Berlin in 1940, he was made a professor at the Faculty for Foreign Studies (Auslandswissenschaftliche Fakultät). He also served as an advisor at the Dienststelle Ribbentrop of the Nazi Party from 1934 until 1938, when the bureau was disbanded upon the appointment of Joachim von Ribbentrop as Foreign Minister. Haushofer then until 1941 sometimes worked at the propaganda department of the German Foreign Office (Informationsabteilung des Auswärtigen Amtes).

Obtaining an insight in Nazi politics, Haushofer from the mid 1930s onwards approached two German resistance circles. Following the outbreak of World War II, Haushofer joined the conservative opponents around the Prussian finance minister Johannes Popitz; he also met with Peter Yorck von Wartenburg and Helmuth James Graf von Moltke from the Kreisau Circle opposition as well as people from the Red Orchestra group, whose Berlin leaders Arvid Harnack and Harro Schulze-Boysen had also taught at the Hochschule für Politik.

Haushofer was involved in Hess' attempts to negotiate peace with the French and British, acting as an intermediary. It has been speculated that he may have encouraged Hess's 1941 flight to Scotland, but if so, it was a dangerous move: Hess's departure from Germany and subsequent arrest by the British meant that Haushofer's chief protector was no longer available. Under suspicion to have helped Hess, Haushofer was put in prison for two months and then kept under Gestapo surveillance. High-ranking members of the Nazi Party looked disapprovingly upon his half-Jewish mother.

He came to agree that the only way to prevent complete military and political disaster was to remove Hitler. After the failed 1944 bomb plot Haushofer went into hiding, but was arrested at a farm in Bavaria on 7 December 1944.

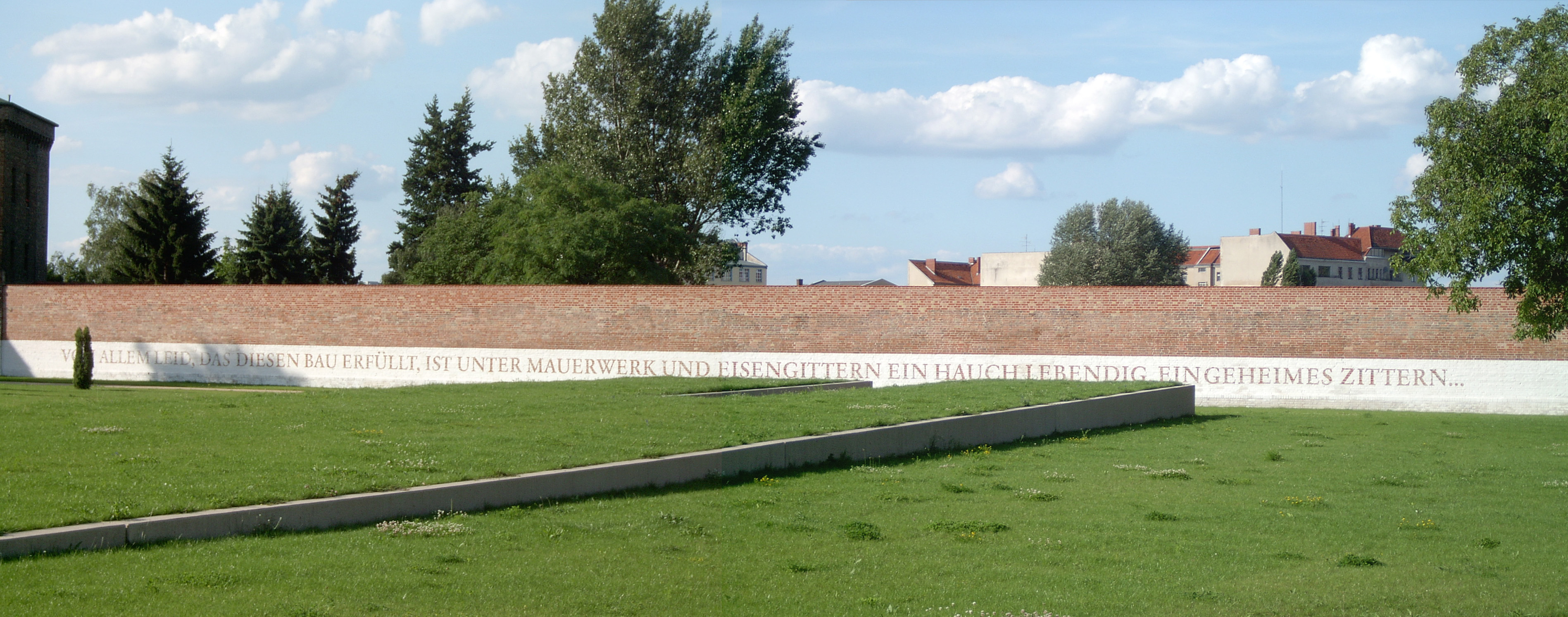
A line of the Sonnets written on the preserved walls of Moabit prison

Incarcerated in Berlin Moabit Prison, he wrote his Moabit Sonnets, posthumously published in 1946. In the night of 22/23 April 1945, as Red Army troops already entered Berlin, Albrecht Haushofer and other inmates like Klaus Bonhoeffer and Rüdiger Schleicher were shot in the neck by SS troopers on nearby Invalidenstraße. His body was discovered by his brother Heinz on 12 May 1945.

== Moabit Sonnets ==
One of the sonnets, titled Schuld or "Guilt", was on his person at the time of his execution. It reads as follows:

Schuld	Guilt
...schuldig bin ich	I am guilty,
Anders als Ihr denkt.	But not in the way you think.
Ich musste früher meine Pflicht erkennen;	I should have earlier recognized my duty;
Ich musste schärfer Unheil Unheil nennen;	I should have more sharply called evil evil;
Mein Urteil habe ich zu lang gelenkt...	I reined in my judgment too long.
Ich habe gewarnt,	I did warn,
Aber nicht genug, und klar;	But not enough, and not clearly enough;
Und heute weiß ich, was ich schuldig war.	And today I know what I was guilty of.

== Works ==
- Pass-Staaten in den Alpen. Vowinckel, Berlin-Grunewald 1928
- Englands Einbruch in China. Junker u. Dünnhaupt, Berlin 1940
- Allgemeine politische Geographie und Geopolitik. Band 1, Vowinckel, Heidelberg
- Scipio. Ein Schauspiel in 5 Akten, Drama, Propyläen-Verlag, Berlin 1934
- Sulla. Ein Schauspiel in 5 Akten, Drama, Propyläen-Verlag, Berlin 1938
- Augustus. Ein Schauspiel in 5 Akten, Drama, Propyläen-Verlag, Berlin 1939
- Chinesische Legende. Eine dramatische Dichtung, Blanvalet, Berlin 1949
- Thomas Morus. Unvollendetes tragisches Schauspiel, Hubertus Schulte Herbrüggen (ed.), Paderborn u. a., Schöningh, 1985.
- Moabiter Sonette. Amelie von Graevenitz (ed.), C. H. Beck, München 2012, ISBN 978-3-406-64166-4
- Hans-Edwin Friedrich, Wilhelm Haefs, ed. (2014), Albrecht Haushofer. Gesammelte Werke. Teil I: Dramen I [Scipio, Sulla, Augustus], Beiträge zur Literatur und Literaturwissenschaft des 20. und 21. Jahrhunderts, 24, Frankfurt am Main u. a.: Peter Lang, ISBN 978-3-631-64478-2
- Traumgesicht: 50 zeitlose Gedichte. Martin Werhand Verlag, Melsbach 2016, ISBN 978-3-943910-75-9

== See also ==
- Duke of Hamilton and the Hess affair
