= Pan-region =

Sphere of influence of a region

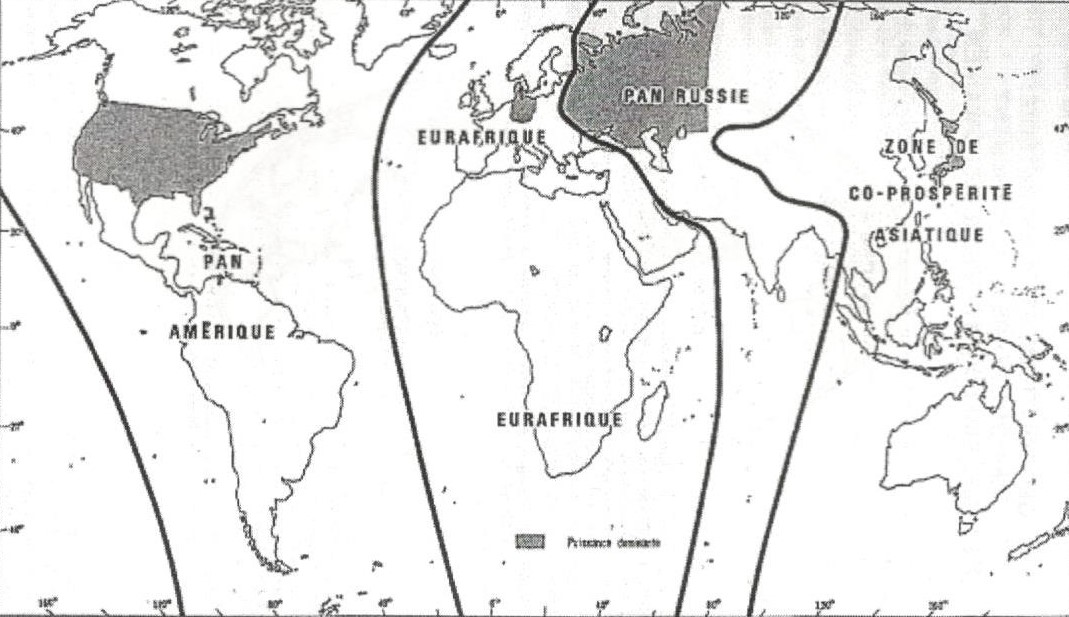
Pan region map

A pan-region is a geographic region or state's sphere of economic, political and cultural influence extending beyond that state's borders. For example, the pan-region of the United States of America (US) regions both bordering the US and its close neighbours including, Canada, Mexico, and many other South America states.

== Origin of term ==
The idea of pan-regions or spheres of economic and cultural influence was first developed by Karl Ernst Haushofer (August 27, 1869 – March 10, 1946), a German general, geographer and geo-politician. Pan-regions contributed to Geopolitic or the German theories of foreign policy during the interwar period (1918–1939) or the time from the end of World War I and the beginning of World War II. Haushofer's pan-regions divided the world under three supreme leading states in economy, politics and culture. Those three states included the USA who controlled North America and much of South America, Germany who controlled Europe, much of Africa and western Asia and Japan who controlled central, eastern, and the islands of southern Asia. These leading states could expect their regions to develop economic and political alliance with their leading state as well as yield to sanctions and major cultural designations.

== Historical examples ==
Historically, the world was divided into three spheres of control; however, after the end of World War II, Germany and Japan's control over their various regions have diminished with the success of other nations. For example, German control over Europe has suffered with the development of the European Union and emergence of other foreign powers. Japan also is beginning to lose economic dominance over its pan-region with the emergence of a thriving Chinese economy.
