= Hérodote =

French academic journal covering geography and geopolitics

- Discipline: Geography
- Language: English
- Edited by: Béatrice Giblin, Yves Lacoste

Publication details
- History: 1976-present
- Publisher: La Découverte
- Frequency: Quarterly

Standard abbreviations
- ISO 4: Hérodote

Indexing
- ISSN: 0338-487X (print); 1776-2987 (web)
- LCCN: 82642448
- OCLC no.: 470212254

Links
- Journal homepage; Online access

Hérodote is a French language peer-reviewed academic journal covering geography and geopolitics. It was established in 1976 by Yves Lacoste. "Hérodote" is the French version of the name of the ancient Greek historian, Herodotus.
