= Vermilion Pencil =

The Vermilion Pencil (朱筆 or 硃筆) was the official register of imperial decrees in Imperial China. Like other oriental monarchies, official sanction of all public acts were conveyed by the impression of a seal. Any remark or directive of the emperor of China was written in red, commonly styled "the vermilion pencil."

== See also ==
- Hanlin Academy
- Qing dynasty
