= Foreign relations of Nazi Germany =

The foreign relations of Nazi Germany were characterized by the territorial expansionist ambitions of Germany's dictator Adolf Hitler and the promotion of the ideologies of anti-communism and antisemitism within Germany and its conquered territories. The Nazi regime oversaw Germany's rise as a militarist world power from the state of humiliation and disempowerment it had experienced following its defeat the Central Powers (German Empire, Austria-Hungary, and Ottoman Empire) in World War I. From the late 1930s to its defeat in 1945, Germany was the most formidable of the Axis powers - a military alliance between Nazi Germany, Fascist Italy, Imperial Japan, and their allies, collaborationists and puppet states.

== 1933–1939 ==
Following the Treaty of Versailles in 1919, Germany succumbed to a considerably weakened position in pan-European politics, losing all its colonial possessions, Alsace-Lorraine, Poland and part of Ukraine, and all its military and naval assets. It was committed to heavy reparations to the Allied Powers, especially Belgium and France. These concessions to the Allied Powers led to a great feeling of disillusionment within the newly established Weimar Republic which paved the way for the Nazi party, under the leadership of Adolf Hitler to seize power. Upon Hitler's taking power in January 1933, Germany began a program of industrialization and rearmament. It re-occupied the Rhineland and sought to dominate neighboring countries with significant German populations.

In 1933–1935 Hitler focused his attention on domestic policies and the control of the Nazi movement. Foreign policy was handled by the same men as in Weimar--the old landed elite. They shared the general German belief in being badly mistreated in the 1920s. Germany stopped all reparations payments in 1933, quit the League of Nations, and stepped up the secret rearmament program. It dealt cautiously with France and Poland.

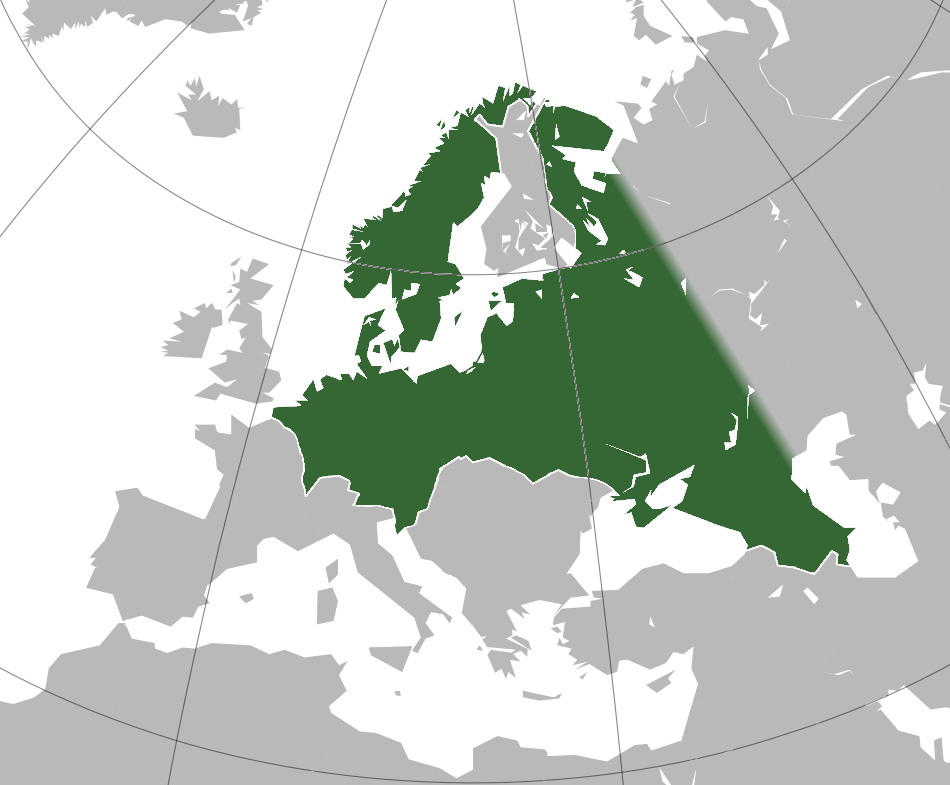
The Greater Germanic Reich, to be realised with the policies of Lebensraum, had boundaries derived from the plans of the Generalplan Ost, the state administration, and the Schutzstaffel (SS).

The decisive change to an aggressive policy came in 1936, with the reoccupation of the Rhineland in explicit violation of the Versailles Treaty. Britain and France decided not to respond with force and Hitler immediately expanded his plans, turning to "lebensraum" -- or an expansion to the east. Hitler's new diplomatic strategy was to make seemingly reasonable demands, threatening war if they were not met. When opponents tried to appease him, he accepted the gains that were offered, then went to the next target. Germany remilitarized the Rhineland, formed an alliance with Mussolini's Italy, sent massive military aid to Franco in the Spanish Civil War, annexed Austria, took over Czechoslovakia after the British and French appeasement of the Munich Agreement, formed a peace pact with Joseph Stalin's Soviet Union, and finally invaded Poland. Britain and France declared war on Germany and World War II in Europe began.

Having established a "Rome-Berlin axis" with Benito Mussolini, and signing the Anti-Comintern Pact with Japan – which was joined by Italy a year later in 1937 – Hitler felt able to take the offensive in foreign policy. On 12 March 1938, German troops marched into Austria, where an attempted Nazi coup had been unsuccessful in 1934. When Austrian-born Hitler entered Vienna, he was greeted by loud cheers and Austrians voted in favour of the annexation of their country. After Austria, Hitler turned to Czechoslovakia, where the Sudeten German minority was demanding equal rights and self-government. At the Munich Conference of September 1938, Hitler, Mussolini, British Prime Minister Neville Chamberlain and French Prime Minister Édouard Daladier agreed upon the cession of Sudeten territory to the German Reich by Czechoslovakia. Hitler thereupon declared that all of German Reich's territorial claims had been fulfilled. However, hardly six months after the Munich Agreement Hitler used the smoldering quarrel between Slovaks and Czechs as a pretext for taking over the rest of Czechoslovakia. He then secured the return of Memel from Lithuania to Germany. Chamberlain was forced to acknowledge that his policy of appeasement towards Hitler had failed. In August 1939 Hitler and Stalin stunned the world with a friendly agreement between two bitter foes. They secretly agreed to split control of Eastern Europe. Germany invaded Poland on September 1, 1939. Britain and France declared war, but neither was prepared to invade Germany or give any help to Poland. The government of Poland collapsed (it did not go into exile), and the Soviets invaded eastern Poland. The war with Poland was over in a matter of days, and the war in the west went into the "phoney war" stage of very little fighting or movement on the ground. (There was action at sea.)

== World War II ==
Germany's foreign policy during the war involved the creation of friendly governments under direct or indirect control from Berlin. A main goal was obtaining soldiers from the senior allies, such as Italy and Hungary, and millions of workers and ample food supplies from subservient allies such as Vichy France. By the fall of 1942, there were 24 divisions from Romania on the Eastern Front, 10 from Italy and 10 from Hungary. When a country was no longer dependable, Germany would assume full control, as it did with France in 1942, Italy in 1943, and Hungary in 1944. Full control allowed the Nazis to achieve their high priority of mass murdering all Jewish population. Although Japan was officially a powerful ally, the relationship was distant and there was little coordination or cooperation, such as Germany's refusal to share the secret formula for making synthetic oil from coal until late in the war.

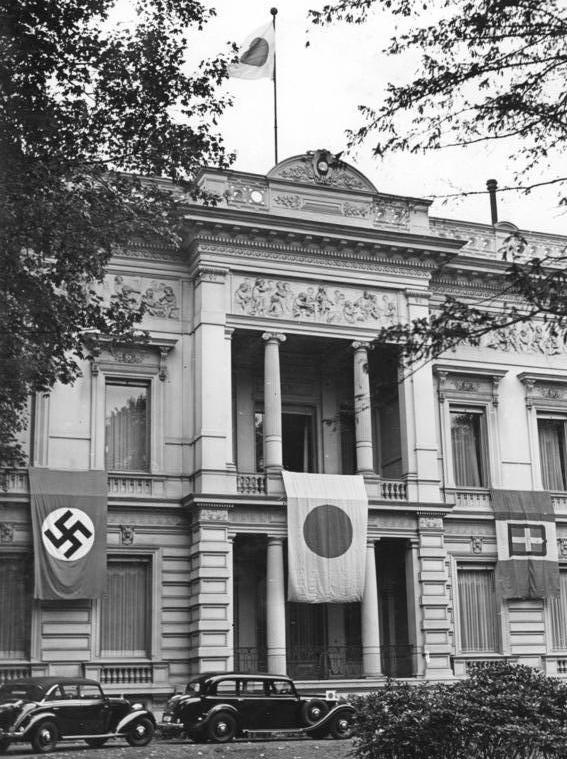
Flags of Germany, Japan, and Italy draping the facade of the Embassy of Japan on the Tiergartenstraße in Berlin (September 1940)

DiNardo argues that in Europe Germany's foreign-policy was dysfunctional during the war, as Hitler treated each ally separately, and refused to create any sort of combined staff that would synchronize policies, armaments, and strategies. Italy, Finland, Romania, and Hungary each dealt with Berlin separately, and never coordinated their activities. Germany was reluctant to share its powerful weapons systems, or to train Axis officers. There were some exceptions, such as the close collaboration between the German and Italian forces in North Africa.

Hitler devoted most of his attention during the war to military and diplomatic affairs. He frequently met with foreign leaders, such as the January 10, 1943, he met with Romanian Premier Marshal Ion Antonescu at German field headquarters, with top-ranking generals on both sides. On 9 August 1943, Hitler summoned Tsar Boris III of Bulgaria to a stormy meeting at field headquarters, and demanded he declare war on Russia. The tsar refused, but did agree to declare war on far-away Britain. American news reports stated that Hitler tried to hit him and the tsar suffered a heart attack at the meeting; he died three weeks later.

== The Holocaust ==
The Holocaust was the genocide of European Jews during World War II. Between 1941 and 1945, Nazi Germany and its collaborators systematically murdered some six million Jews across German-occupied Europe, around two-thirds of Europe's Jewish population. The murders were carried out primarily through mass shootings and poison gas in extermination camps.

Nazi policy from 1933 was to force all Jews to leave Germany. The regime passed anti-Jewish laws, encouraged harassment, and orchestrated a nationwide pogrom in November 1938. After invading Poland occupation authorities began to establish ghettos to segregate Jews. Following the invasion of the Soviet Union in June 1941, 1.5 to 2 million Jews were shot by German forces and local collaborators.

Later in 1941 or early 1942, the highest levels of the German government decided to murder all Jews in Europe. Victims were deported by rail to extermination camps where, if they survived the journey, most were killed with poison gas. Other Jews continued to be employed in forced labor camps where many died from starvation, abuse, exhaustion, or being used as test subjects in deadly medical experiments. The majority of Holocaust victims died in 1942. The killing continued at a lower rate until the end of the war in May 1945. Separate Nazi persecutions killed a similar or larger number of non-Jewish civilians and POWs; the term Holocaust is sometimes used to also refer to the persecution of these other groups.

== Relations with the Axis powers ==
=== Japan ===
Hitler made a military alliance with Japan, but there was little communication, trade or coordination before or during the war.

Japan's ambassador was received cordially in Berlin and made highly detailed reports to Tokyo on Nazi plans. However his diplomatic code was broken by MAGIC and the British gained top level intelligence on Hitler's overall plans.

== Relations with the Allied powers ==
Nazi Germany financed and supported political organizations that opposed the hostile policies of the United Kingdom, United States and France. German intelligence operations by Abwehr were poorly done. All the spies in the U.S. were quickly captured. All German spies in Britain were "turned" and were used to feed false information that misled Berlin into defending the wrong landing zones during the Allied invasion of June 1944.

=== Relations with the Soviet Union ===
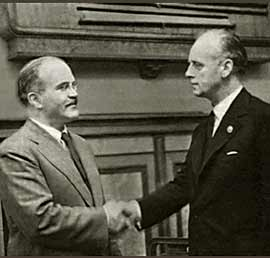
Soviet Premier Vyacheslav Molotov (left) shakes hands with Nazi Germany Ministère of foreign affairs Joachim von Ribbentrop (right) after the signing of the Molotov–Ribbentrop Non-Aggression Pact.

A major element in Nazi propaganda denounced Communism in Germany and in the Soviet Union. After 1933 Communism was largely destroyed inside Germany. Nazi foreign relations with the Soviet Union were cold. Moscow tried and failed to form alliances with Britain, France and Eastern European countries. The West wanted to protect Poland and Berlin had much more to offer: half of Poland and Eastern Europe. Suddenly Moscow and Berlin came together. On August 23, 1939, the two regimes signed the Molotov–Ribbentrop non-aggression pact that publicly stated that the two countries would not go to war. Trade expanded to include Russian oil for Germany. However the two regimes had agreed to a secret plan. In this hidden agenda, the Nazi's and the Soviet Union carved Poland, Lithuania, Estonia, Finland, and Bessarabia into spheres of influence. Moscow would receive the eastern portion of Poland and the countries Latvia, Estonia, Finland, and Bessarabia. Berlin would obtain the Western portion of Poland and the country of Lithuania. Both parties followed the agreement and both gained enormously.

By late 1940 trouble began. Germany's astonishingly easy victory over France made it the dominant power in Europe. Stalin anxiously wanted to add Bulgaria to the Soviet sphere, but Hitler convinced it and most of the other Balkan states to formally join the Axis. Stalin wanted peace with Hitler, and underestimated the dangers. His military was geared to offense, and was too exposed to be effective on the defence. Russian spies accurately told the Kremlin that Hitler was preparing to invade the Soviet Union. Stalin refused to believe the stories and refused to build up a defensive line. On June 22, 1941, Germany formally declared war on the Soviet Union and began Operation Barbarossa, an unusually fierce war that was directed personally by Hitler and Stalin, and which ended in total Soviet victory.

=== Relations with China ===
The Nazis sought to increase cooperation with the Chinese Nationalists in order to gain access to Chinese raw materials. Foreign Minister Konstantin von Neurath very much believed in maintaining Germany's good relations with China and mistrusted Japan. The 1931 Japanese invasion of Manchuria had shown Chiang and the Chinese leadership the need for military and industrial modernization and they wanted German investment. In May 1933, Hans von Seeckt arrived in Shanghai to oversee German economic and military involvement in China. He submitted the Denkschrift für Marschall Chiang Kai-shek memorandum outlining his programme for industrialising and militarising China. He called for a small, mobile, and well-equipped force to replace the massive but under-trained army. In addition, he advocated for the army to be the "foundation of ruling power" and for military power to rest in qualitative superiority derived from qualified officers. Von Seeckt suggested that the first step toward achieving this framework was the uniform training and consolidation of the Chinese military under Chiang's command and that the entire military system must be subordinated into a centralised hierarchy. Toward that goal, von Seeckt proposed the formation of a "training brigade" to replace the German eliteheer, which would train other units, with its officer corps selected from strict military placements.

== Relations with neutral countries ==
Despite its pan-Germanic expansionism, the Nazi regime did not invade Switzerland or Sweden.

=== Spain ===
In the early part of World War II, Germany's foreign relations with Spain heavily revolved around propaganda efforts. These efforts were geared mainly at having Francoist Spain enter the war on the side of the Axis powers. Spain had close ties with Nazi Germany since it gave aid both militarily and financially in the Spanish Civil War that occurred four years before World War II that installed Francisco Franco as autocrat of Spain. Germany facilitated this rise of Franco due to its lust for Spanish economic institutions and mineral mines, which would be necessary for a pre-war military buildup; a strategic move in foreign relations that allowed Germany to both have a close European ally and an established industrial center. With Germany engaged in a Europe wide military conflict, it looked to Spain to become a close military ally of the Reich. To make this goal a reality, Nazi Germany sent Hans Josef Lazar to Spain to head the country's pro-Nazi regime propaganda efforts. As the war progressed, Germany started to shift its aims of recruiting Spain to become one of the Axis powers to have it as a neutral power that could supply Germany with the resources it needed to fuel its militaristic ambitions. In February 1942, Spain and Germany signed the Spanish-German Secret Protocol, which solidified this new stance of Spanish neutrality between the two countries. With this latest secret protocol in place, Lazar began gearing Nazi propaganda towards supporting the Franco regime to create political stability within Spain and solidify Nazi ties to the Spanish leadership to ensure the continued support of the German war effort. Lazar was instructed by Berlin to portray critical messages in Nazi propaganda during the war, the first being that Germany had the right to wage war due to the allies blaming Germany solely for the cause of World War I and secondly, portraying Great Britain in a negative light.

In January 1942, with a sharp increase in Allied propaganda being funneled into Spain, the German government proposed the Große plan, which aimed at taking this allied propaganda and misconstruing it to portray pro-Nazi messages. The Große plan was mostly successful until 1944. When Germany started to falter in its war performance, Spanish news agencies began to print less and less pro-German propaganda within their publications. This downward trend of printing pro-Nazi propaganda would continue to the end of World War II, making the Große Plan an inadequate long-term solution for German Propaganda efforts.

Even though print propaganda in Spain was not employed very much after 1944, Germany's other objective for Spain was influencing pro-German sentiment in other countries. To do this, Germany undertook the construction of radio towers within Spain that could transmit to other countries in hopes of fostering pro-Nazi sentiment. These radio stations attempted to support the Nazis covertly, but it did not take long for observers to uncover the German bias in its messaging. In sum, however, these radio stations were useful in disseminating German propaganda in the Americas, but in the Americas listeners were not perceptive to this pro-Nazi propaganda.

== Regional relations ==
=== Americas ===
The Third Reich considered the Americas to belong to the sphere of influence of the United States. During the Second World War, Nazi Germany's central foreign policy towards American countries was to maintain neutrality.

=== Middle East ===
Nazi German government representatives cultivated ties with the Muslim religious leaders in the early 1940s, such as Hajj Amin al-Husseini, the Grand Mufti of Jerusalem. Hardline Muslim clerics such as al-Husseini endorsed Nazi Germany's anti-Jewish agenda and pogroms, and actively sought to recruit the Muslims of Bosnia and Eastern Europe for Nazi German military forces.

=== India ===
To weaken the British Empire, Nazi Germany expressed support for hardline Indian revolutionaries seeking India's independence. Berlin sponsored an active propaganda campaign. Although the Indian National Congress officially opposed Nazi, it refused to support the British war effort and its leaders were imprisoned. Nevertheless the India Army did fight in the Middle East against Germany and Italy. Revolutionaries under Subhas Chandra Bose openly received Germany's endorsement. With Japanese military backing, Bose formed the Provisional Government of Free India and the Indian National Army to fight British forces, but he was decisively defeated.

== Goals ==
Hitler's speeches sometimes did mention return of the lost African colonies, as a bargaining point, but at all times his real target was Eastern Europe.

== See also ==
- Axis powers
- The Holocaust
- Lebensraum

== Sources ==
- Beevor, Antony (2012). The Second World War. New York: Little, Brown. ISBN 978-0-316-02374-0.
- Evans, Richard J. (2005). The Third Reich in Power. Penguin Books. ISBN 978-1-440-64930-1.
- Kirby, William (1984). Germany and Republican China. Stanford UP.
- Liu, Frederick (1956). A Military History of Modern China, 1924–1949. Princeton UP.
