= Geopolitics =

Study of geography's effects on politics

Geopolitics (from Ancient Greek γῆ gê 'earth, land' and πολιτική politikḗ 'politics') is the study of the effects of Earth's geography on politics and international relations. Geopolitics usually refers to countries and relations between them; it may also focus on two other kinds of states: de facto independent states with limited international recognition and relations between sub-national geopolitical entities, such as the federated states that make up a federation, confederation, or a quasi-federal system.

At the level of international relations, geopolitics is a method of studying foreign policy to understand, explain, and predict international political behavior through geographical variables. These include area studies, climate, topography, demography, natural resources, and applied science of the region being evaluated.

Geopolitics focuses on political power linked to geographic space, in particular, territorial waters, land territory and wealth of natural resources, in correlation with diplomatic history, in particular the context of a larger power relative to its neighboring states of smaller or similar power. Some scholars have argued that geopolitics should serve as "an aid to statecraft." Topics of geopolitics include relations between the interests of international political actors focused within an area, a space, or a geographical element, relations that create a geopolitical system. Critical geopolitics deconstructs classical geopolitical theories, by showing their political or ideological functions for great powers. There are some works that discuss the geopolitics of renewable energy. The relationship between geopolitics and geoeconomics is often analyzed by two main schools of thought: the strategic school and the political-economic school. According to Christopher Gogwilt and other researchers, the term is currently being used to describe a broad spectrum of concepts, in a general sense used as "a synonym for international political relations", but more specifically "to imply the global structure of such relations"; this usage builds on an "early-twentieth-century term for a pseudoscience of political geography" and other pseudoscientific theories of historical and geographic determinism.

The Austro-Hungarian historian Emil Reich (1854–1910) is considered to be the first to have coined the term in English as early as 1902 and later published in England in 1904 in his book Foundations of Modern Europe.

== United States ==
=== Alfred Thayer Mahan and sea power ===
Alfred Thayer Mahan (1840–1914) was a frequent commentator on world naval strategic and diplomatic affairs. Mahan believed that national greatness was inextricably associated with the sea—and particularly with its commercial use in peace and its control in war. Mahan's theoretical framework came from Antoine-Henri Jomini, and emphasized that strategic locations (such as choke points, canals, and coaling stations), as well as quantifiable levels of fighting power in a fleet, were conducive to control over the sea. He proposed six conditions required for a nation to have sea power:

1. Advantageous geographical position;
2. Serviceable coastlines, abundant natural resources, and a favorable climate;
3. Extent of territory
4. Population large enough to defend its territory;
5. Society with an aptitude for the sea and commercial enterprise; and
6. The Government with the influence and inclination to dominate the sea.

Mahan distinguished a key region of the world in the Eurasian context, namely, the Central Zone of Asia lying between 30° and 40° north and stretching from Asia Minor to Japan. In this zone independent countries still survived – Turkey, Persia, Afghanistan, China, and Japan. Mahan regarded those countries, located between Britain and Russia, as if between "Scylla and Charybdis". Of the two monsters – Britain and Russia – it was the latter that Mahan considered more threatening to the fate of Central Asia. Mahan was impressed by Russia's transcontinental size and strategically favorable position for southward expansion. Therefore, he found it necessary for the Anglo-Saxon "sea power" to resist Russia.

=== Nicholas J. Spykman ===
Nicholas J. Spykman was both a follower and critic of geostrategists Alfred Mahan, and Halford Mackinder. His work was based on assumptions similar to Mackinder's, including the unity of world politics and the world sea. He extends this to include the unity of the air. Spykman adopts Mackinder's divisions of the world, renaming some;

1. The Heartland;
2. The Rimland (analogous to Mackinder's "inner or marginal crescent" also an intermediate region, lying between the Heartland and the marginal sea powers); and
3. The Offshore Islands & Continents (Mackinder's "outer or insular crescent").

Under Spykman's theory, a Rimland separates the Heartland from ports that are usable throughout the year (that is, not frozen up during winter). Spykman suggested this required that attempts by Heartland nations (particularly Russia) to conquer ports in the Rimland must be prevented. Spykman modified Mackinder's formula on the relationship between the Heartland and the Rimland (or the inner crescent), claiming that "Who controls the rimland rules Eurasia. Who rules Eurasia controls the destinies of the world." Spykman died before the end of World War II, but his theories influenced the concept of containment, in that Spykman argued that the United States should support states in the Rimland to balance against a Heartland power (see also Truman Doctrine).

=== Homer Lea ===
Homer Lea, in The Day of the Saxon (1912), asserted that the British overseas possessions faced a threat from German (Teuton), Russian (Slav), and Japanese expansionism: The "fatal" relationship of Russia, Japan, and Germany "has now assumed through the urgency of natural forces a coalition directed against the survival of Saxon supremacy." It is "a dreadful Dreibund". The title of the book is somewhat misleading as the "Day" is implied only for the British Saxon, not the American one, and only for the British Saxon overseas. Britain itself is not doomed. Lea believed that while Japan moved against Far East and Russia against India, the Germans would strike at England, the center of the British Empire. By allowing the "amalgamation of the Germanic race", the British Empire "prepared the plans to its own sarcophagus". Writing before the First World War, Lea predicted wars between Britain and Germany and between Japan and the United States, but precluded the war between Germany and Russia before their common defeat of the British Empire because such a war would be mutually defeating for both.

=== Edmund Walsh ===
Edmund Walsh, established the School of Foreign Service at Georgetown University in 1919 to support the study of international relations in the United States. Walsh strongly criticized the work of Haushofer and the danger of Nazism, arguing in favor of a new and uniquely American geopolitics. After the end of World War II, Walsh served as an advisor to the Nuremberg Trials and interviewed Haushofer in captivity.

=== Kissinger, Brzezinski, and the Grand Chessboard ===
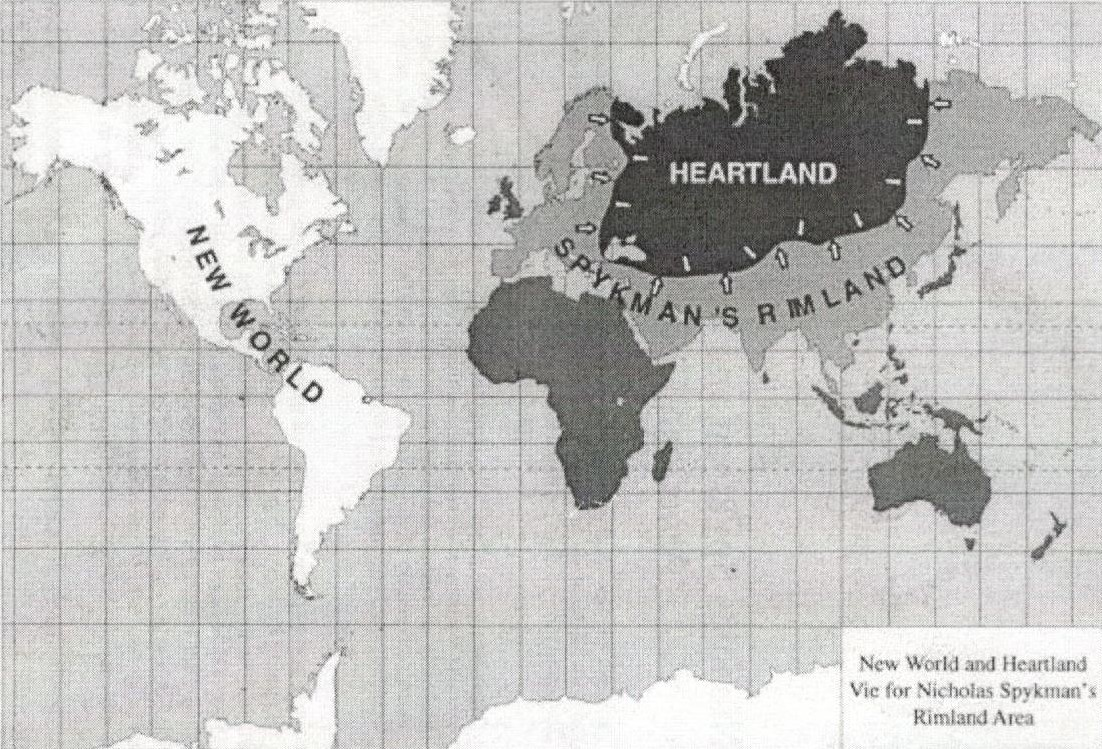
World map with the concepts of Heartland and Rimland applied

Two national security advisors from the Cold War period, Henry Kissinger and Zbigniew Brzezinski, argued to continue the United States' geopolitical focus on Eurasia and, particularly Russia, despite the dissolution of the Soviet Union and the end of the Cold War. Both continued their influence on geopolitics after the end of the Cold War, writing books on the subject in the 1990s—Diplomacy and The Grand Chessboard: American Primacy and Its Geostrategic Imperatives. The Anglo-American classical geopolitical theories were revived.

Kissinger argued against the belief that with the dissolution of the USSR, hostile intentions had come to an end and traditional foreign policy considerations no longer applied. "They would argue … that Russia, regardless of who governs it, sits astride the territory which Halford Mackinder called the geopolitical heartland, and it is the heir to one of the most potent imperial traditions." Therefore, the United States must "maintain the global balance of power vis-à-vis the country with a long history of expansionism."

After Russia, the second geopolitical threat that remained was Germany and, as Mackinder had feared ninety years ago, its partnership with Russia. During the Cold War, Kissinger argues, both sides of the Atlantic recognized that, "unless America is organically involved in Europe, it would later be obliged to involve itself under circumstances which would be far less favorable to both sides of the Atlantic. That is even more true today. Germany has become so strong that existing European institutions and organizations cannot strike a balance between Germany and its European partners all by themselves. Nor can Europe, even with the assistance of Germany, manage […] Russia" all by itself. Thus Kissinger believed that no country's interests would ever be served if Germany and Russia were to ever form a partnership in which each country would consider itself the principal partner. They would raise fears of condominiums. Without America, Britain and France cannot cope with Germany and Russia; and "without Europe, America could turn … into an island off the shores of Eurasia."

Nicholas J. Spykman's vision of Eurasia was strongly confirmed: "Geopolitically, America is an island off the shores of the large landmass of Eurasia, whose resources and population far exceed those of the United States. The domination by a single power of either of Eurasia's two principal spheres—Europe and Asia—remains a good definition of strategic danger for America. Cold War or no Cold War. For such a grouping would have the capacity to outstrip America economically and, in the end, militarily. That danger would have to be resisted even if the dominant power was apparently benevolent, for if its intentions ever changed, America would find itself with a grossly diminished capacity for effective resistance and a growing inability to shape events." The main interest of the American leaders is maintaining the balance of power in Eurasia.

Having converted from an ideologist into a geopolitician, Kissinger retrospectively interpreted the Cold War in geopolitical terms—an approach which was not characteristic of his works during the Cold War. Now, however, he focused on the beginning of the Cold War: "The objective of moral opposition to Communism had merged with the geopolitical task of containing Soviet expansion." Nixon, he added, was a geopolitical rather than an ideological cold warrior.

Three years after Kissinger's Diplomacy, Zbigniew Brzezinski followed suit, launching The Grand Chessboard: American Primacy and Its Geostrategic Imperatives and, after three more years, The Geostrategic Triad: Living with China, Europe, and Russia. The Grand Chessboard described the American triumph in the Cold War in terms of control over Eurasia: for the first time ever, a "non-Eurasian" power had emerged as a key arbiter of "Eurasian" power relations. The book states its purpose: "The formulation of a comprehensive and integrated Eurasian geostrategy is therefore the purpose of this book." Although the power configuration underwent a revolutionary change, Brzezinski confirmed three years later, Eurasia was still a mega-continent. Like Spykman, Brzezinski acknowledges that: "Cumulatively, Eurasia's power vastly overshadows America's."

In classical Spykman terms, Brzezinski formulated his geostrategic "chessboard" doctrine of Eurasia, which aims to prevent the unification of this mega-continent.

"Europe and Asia are politically and economically powerful…. It follows that… American foreign policy must…employ its influence in Eurasia in a manner that creates a stable continental equilibrium, with the United States as the political arbiter.… Eurasia is thus the chessboard on which the struggle for global primacy continues to be played, and that struggle involves geo- strategy – the strategic management of geopolitical interests…. But in the meantime it is imperative that no Eurasian challenger emerges, capable of dominating Eurasia and thus also of challenging America… For America the chief geopolitical prize is Eurasia…and America's global primacy is directly dependent on how long and how effectively its preponderance on the Eurasian continent is sustained."

== United Kingdom ==
=== Mackinder and the Heartland Theory ===
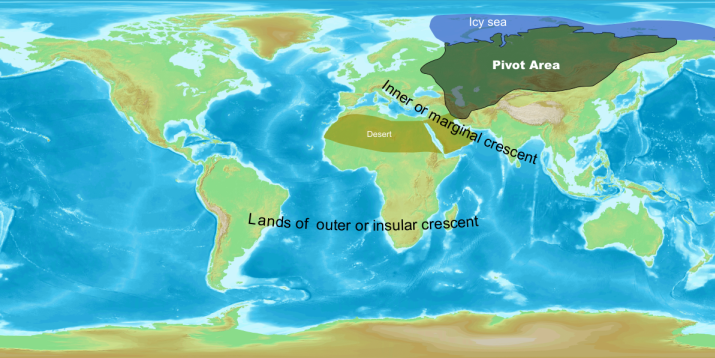
Sir Halford Mackinder's Heartland concept showing the situation of the "pivot area" established in the Theory of the Heartland. He later revised it to mark Northern Eurasia as a pivot while keeping area marked above as Heartland.

Sir Halford Mackinder's Heartland Theory initially received little attention outside the world of geography, but some thinkers have claimed that it subsequently influenced the foreign policies of world powers. Those scholars who look to MacKinder through critical lenses accept him as an organic strategist who tried to build a foreign policy vision for Britain with his Eurocentric analysis of historical geography. His formulation of the Heartland Theory was set out in his article entitled "The Geographical Pivot of History", published in England in 1904. Mackinder's doctrine of geopolitics involved concepts diametrically opposed to the notion of Alfred Thayer Mahan about the significance of navies (he coined the term sea power) in world conflict. He saw navy as a basis of Colombian era empire (roughly from 1492 to the 19th century), and predicted the 20th century to be domain of land power. The Heartland theory hypothesized a huge empire being brought into existence in the Heartland—which would not need to use coastal or transoceanic transport to remain coherent. The basic notions of Mackinder's doctrine involve considering the geography of the Earth as being divided into two sections: the World Island or Core, comprising Eurasia and Africa; and the Peripheral "islands", including the Americas, Australia, Japan, the British Isles, and Oceania. Not only was the Periphery noticeably smaller than the World Island, it necessarily required much sea transport to function at the technological level of the World Island—which contained sufficient natural resources for a developed economy.

Mackinder posited that the industrial centers of the Periphery were necessarily located in widely separated locations. The World Island could send its navy to destroy each one of them in turn, and could locate its own industries in a region further inland than the Periphery (so they would have a longer struggle reaching them, and would face a well-stocked industrial bastion). Mackinder called this region the Heartland. It essentially comprised Central and Eastern Europe: Ukraine, Western Russia, and Mitteleuropa. The Heartland contained the grain reserves of Ukraine, and many other natural resources. Mackinder's notion of geopolitics was summed up when he said:

Who rules Central and Eastern Europe commands the Heartland. Who rules the Heartland commands the World-Island. Who rules the World-Island commands the World.

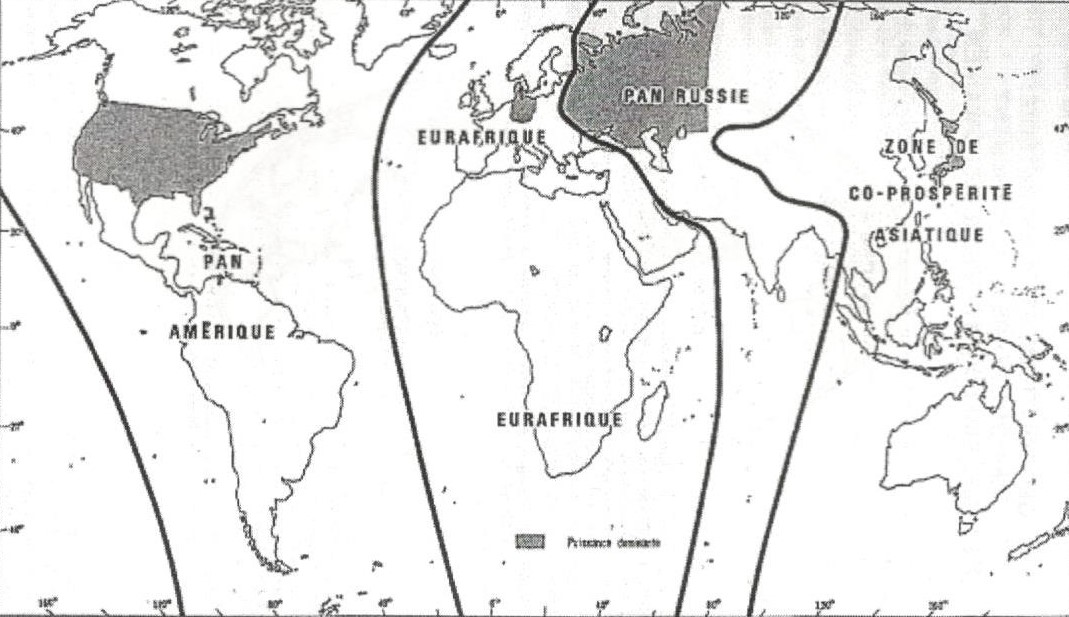
Division of the world according to Haushofer's pan-regions doctrine

Another follower of Mackinder was Karl Haushofer who called Mackinder's Geographical Pivot of History a "genius' scientific tractate." He commented on it: "Never have I seen anything greater than those few pages of geopolitical masterwork." Mackinder located his Pivot, in the words of Haushofer, on "one of the first solid, geopolitically and geographically irreproachable maps, presented to one of the earliest scientific forums of the planet – the Royal Geographic Society in London" Haushofer adopted both Mackinder's Heartland thesis and his view of the Russian-German alliance – powers that Mackinder saw as the major contenders for control of Eurasia in the twentieth century. Following Mackinder he suggested an alliance with the Soviet Union and, advancing a step beyond Mackinder, added Japan to his design of the Eurasian Bloc.

In 2004, at the centenary of The Geographical Pivot of History, Historian Paul Kennedy wrote: "Right now with hundreds of thousands of US troops in the Eurasian rimlands and with administration constantly explaining why it has to stay the course, it looks as if Washington is taking seriously Mackinder's injunction to ensure control of the geographical pivot of history."

== Germany ==
=== Friedrich Ratzel ===
Friedrich Ratzel (1844–1904), influenced by thinkers such as Darwin and zoologist Ernst Heinrich Haeckel, contributed to 'Geopolitik' by the expansion on the biological conception of geography, without a static conception of borders. Positing that states are organic and growing, with borders representing only a temporary stop in their movement, he held that the expanse of a state's borders is a reflection of the health of the nation—meaning that static countries are in decline. Ratzel published several papers, among which was the essay "Lebensraum" (1901) concerning biogeography. Ratzel created a foundation for the German variant of geopolitics, geopolitik. Influenced by the American geostrategist Alfred Thayer Mahan, Ratzel wrote of aspirations for German naval reach, agreeing that sea power was self-sustaining, as the profit from trade would pay for the merchant marine, unlike land power.

The geopolitical theory of Ratzel has been criticized as being too sweeping, and his interpretation of human history and geography being too simple and mechanistic. Critically, he also underestimated the importance of social organization in the development of power.

=== The association of German Geopolitik with Nazism ===
After World War I, the thoughts of Rudolf Kjellén and Ratzel were picked up and extended by a number of German authors such as Karl Haushofer (1869–1946), Erich Obst, Hermann Lautensach, and Otto Maull. In 1923, Karl Haushofer founded the Zeitschrift für Geopolitik (Journal for Geopolitics), which was later used in the propaganda of Nazi Germany. The key concepts of Haushofer's Geopolitik were Lebensraum, autarky, pan-regions, and organic borders. States have, Haushofer argued, an undeniable right to seek natural borders which would guarantee autarky.

Haushofer's influence within the Nazi Party has been challenged, given that Haushofer failed to incorporate the Nazis' racial ideology into his work. Popular views of the role of geopolitics in the Nazi Third Reich suggest a fundamental significance on the part of the geo-politicians in the ideological orientation of the Nazi state. Bassin (1987) reveals that these popular views are in important ways misleading and incorrect.

Despite the numerous similarities and affinities between the two doctrines, geopolitics was always held suspect by the National Socialist ideologists. This was understandable, for the underlying philosophical orientation of geopolitics did not comply with that of National Socialism. Geopolitics shared Ratzel's scientific materialism and geographic determinism, and held that human society was determined by external influences—in the face of which qualities held innately by individuals or groups were of reduced or no significance. National Socialism rejected in principle both materialism and determinism and also elevated innate human qualities, in the form of a hypothesized 'racial character,' to the factor of greatest significance in the constitution of human society. These differences led after 1933 to friction and ultimately to open denunciation of geopolitics by Nazi ideologues. Nevertheless, German Geopolitik was discredited by its (mis)use in Nazi expansionist policy of World War II and has never achieved standing comparable to the pre-war period.

The resultant negative association, particularly in U.S. academic circles, between classical geopolitics and Nazi or imperialist ideology, is based on loose justifications. This has been observed in particular by critics of contemporary academic geography, and proponents of a "neo"-classical geopolitics in particular. These include Haverluk et al., who argue that the stigmatization of geopolitics in academia is unhelpful as geopolitics as a field of positivist inquiry maintains potential in researching and resolving topical, often politicized issues such as conflict resolution and prevention, and mitigating climate change.

=== Disciplinary differences in perspectives ===
Negative associations with the term "geopolitics" and its practical application stemming from its association with World War II and pre-World War II German scholars and students of geopolitics are largely specific to the field of academic geography, and especially sub-disciplines of human geography such as political geography. However, this negative association is not as strong in disciplines such as history or political science, which make use of geopolitical concepts. Classical geopolitics forms an important element of analysis for military history as well as for sub-disciplines of political science such as international relations and security studies. This difference in disciplinary perspectives is addressed by Bert Chapman in Geopolitics: A Guide To the Issues, in which Chapman makes note that academic and professional International Relations journals are more amenable to the study and analysis of Geopolitics, and in particular Classical geopolitics, than contemporary academic journals in the field of political geography.

In disciplines outside geography, geopolitics is not negatively viewed (as it often is among academic geographers such as Carolyn Gallaher or Klaus Dodds) as a tool of imperialism or associated with Nazism, but rather viewed as a valid and consistent manner of assessing major international geopolitical circumstances and events, not necessarily related to armed conflict or military operations.

== France ==
=== Montesquieu and climate theory ===
French geopolitical doctrines broadly opposed to German Geopolitik and reject the idea of a fixed geography. French geography is focused on the evolution of polymorphic territories being the result of mankind's actions. It also relies on the consideration of long time periods through a refusal to take specific events into account. This method has been theorized by Professor Lacoste according to three principles: Representation; Diachronie; and Diatopie.

In The Spirit of the Laws, Montesquieu outlined the view that man and societies are influenced by climate. He believed that hotter climates create hot-tempered people and colder climates aloof people, whereas the mild climate of France is ideal for political systems. Considered one of the founders of French geopolitics, Élisée Reclus, is the author of a book considered a reference in modern geography (Nouvelle Géographie universelle). Alike Ratzel, he considers geography through a global vision. However, in complete opposition to Ratzel's vision, Reclus considers geography not to be unchanging; it is supposed to evolve commensurately to the development of human society. His marginal political views resulted in his rejection by academia.

=== Ancel, Braudel, and the rejection of determinism ===
French geographer and geopolitician Jacques Ancel (1879–1936) is considered to be the first theoretician of geopolitics in France, and gave a notable series of lectures at the European Center of the Carnegie Endowment for International Peace in Paris and published Géopolitique in 1936. Like Reclus, Ancel rejects German determinist views on geopolitics (including Haushofer's doctrines).

Braudel's broad view used insights from other social sciences, employed the concept of the longue durée, and downplayed the importance of specific events. This method was inspired by the French geographer Paul Vidal de la Blache (who in turn was influenced by German thought, particularly that of Friedrich Ratzel whom he had met in Germany). Braudel's method was to analyse the interdependence between individuals and their environment. Vidalian geopolitics is based on varied forms of cartography and on possibilism (founded on a societal approach of geography—i.e. on the principle of spaces polymorphic faces depending from many factors among them mankind, culture, and ideas) as opposed to determinism.

=== Lacoste and the renaissance of French geopolitics ===
Due to the influence of German Geopolitik on French geopolitics, the latter were for a long time banished from academic works. In the mid-1970s, Yves Lacoste—a French geographer who was directly inspired by Ancel, Braudel and Vidal de la Blache—wrote La géographie, ça sert d'abord à faire la guerre (Geography first use is war) in 1976. This book symbolizes the birth of this new school of geopolitics (if not so far the first French school of geopolitics as Ancel was very isolated in the 1930s–40s). Initially linked with communist party evolved to a less liberal approach. At the end of the 1980s he founded the Institut Français de Géopolitique (French Institute for Geopolitics) that publishes the Hérodote revue. While rejecting the generalizations and broad abstractions employed by the German and Anglo-American traditions (and the new geographers), this school does focus on spatial dimension of geopolitics affairs on different levels of analysis. This approach emphasizes the importance of multi-level (or multi-scales) analysis and maps at the opposite of critical geopolitics which avoid such tools. Lacoste proposed that every conflict (both local or global) can be considered from a perspective grounded in three assumptions:

1. Representation: Each group or individuals is the product of an education and is characterized by specific representations of the world or others groups or individuals. Thus, basic societal beliefs are grounded in their ethnicity or specific location. The study of representation is a common point with the more contemporary critical geopolitics. Both are connected with the work of Henri Lefebvre (La production de l'espace, first published in 1974)
2. Diachronie. Conducting an historical analysis confronting "long periods" and short periods as the prominent French historian Fernand Braudel suggested.
3. Diatopie: Conducting a cartographic survey through a multi-scale mapping.

Connected with this stream, and former member of Hérodote editorial board, the French geographer Michel Foucher developed a long term analysis of international borders. He coined various neologism among them: Horogenesis: Neologism that describes the concept of studying the birth of borders, Dyade: border shared by two neighbouring states (for instance US territory has two terrestrial dyades : one with Canada and one with Mexico). The main book of this searcher "Fronts et frontières" (Fronts and borders) first published in 1991, without equivalent remains untranslated in English. Michel Foucher is an expert of the African Union for borders affairs.

More or less connected with this school, Stéphane Rosière can be quoted as the editor in Chief of the online journal L'Espace politique, this journal created in 2007 became the most prominent French journal of political geography and Geopolitics with Hérodote.

French philosopher Michel Foucault's dispositif introduced for the purpose of biopolitical research was also adopted in the field of geopolitical thought where it now plays a role.

== Russia ==
The geopolitical stance adopted by Russia has traditionally been informed by a Eurasian perspective, and Russia's location provides a degree of continuity between the Tsarist and Soviet geostrategic stance and the position of Russia in the international order. In the 1990s, a senior researcher at the Institute of Philosophy, Russian Academy of Sciences of the Russian Academy of Sciences, Vadim Tsymbursky (1957–2009), coined the term "island-Russia" and developed the "Great Limitrophe" concept.

Colonel-General Leonid Ivashov (retired), a Russian geopolitics specialist of the early 21st century, headed the Academy of Geopolitical Problems (Russian: Академия геополитических проблем), which analyzes the international and domestic situations and develops geopolitical doctrine. Earlier, he headed the Main Directorate for International Military Cooperation of the Ministry of Defence of the Russian Federation.

Vladimir Karyakin, leading researcher at the Russian Institute for Strategic Studies, has proposed the term "geopolitics of the third wave".

Aleksandr Dugin, a Russian political analyst who has developed a close relationship with Russia's Academy of the General Staff wrote "The Foundations of Geopolitics: The Geopolitical Future of Russia" in 1997, which has had a large influence within the Russian military, police, and foreign policy elites and it has been used as a textbook in the Academy of the General Staff of the Russian military. Its publication in 1997 was well received in Russia and powerful Russian political figures subsequently took an interest in Dugin.

== China ==
In the early 21st century, according to the report of the National Bureau of Asian Research, the main concern of the Chinese geopolitical experts was what they regarded as the US geopolitical challenge. They viewed the US geopolitics in line with the doctrines of Spykman and Brzezinski, namely the containment of Eurasian peer competitors to perpetuate the US hegemony. Yesterday’s Containment of the Soviet Union and today’s Indo-Pacific strategy are identical in both aim and means. These means include the US-led network of military alliances providing the US with strategic bridgeheads and expansion of what the US 2001 Quadrennial Defense Review called the “geostrategic encirclement of China’s maritime environment". The major difference with the Cold War era is that the Pentagon identified the rise of China as its biggest future challenge, surpassing the threat posed by the Soviet Union The US treats what Spykman called the Eurasian Rimland as geopolitical battleground. One conviction shared by the Chinese, Russian and Anglo-American geopolitical schools, is that Eurasia is the main springboard to world hegemony and will remain the focal region of great-power competition.

According to Li Lingqun, a major feature of the People's Republic of China's geopolitics is attempting to change the laws of the sea to advance claims in the South China Sea. Another geopolitical issue is PRC's claims over the territories of Taiwan against the government of the Republic of China.

Various analysts state that China created the Belt and Road Initiative as a geostrategic effort to take a larger role in global affairs, and undermine what the Communist Party perceives as American hegemony. It has also been argued that China co-founded the Asian Infrastructure Investment Bank and New Development Bank to compete with the World Bank and the International Monetary Fund in development finance. According to Bobo Lo, the Shanghai Cooperation Organization has been advertised as a "political organization of a new type" claimed to transcend geopolitics. Political scientist Pak Nung Wong says that a major form of geopolitics between the US and China includes cybersecurity competition, policy regulations regarding technology standards and social media platforms, and traditional and non-traditional forms of espionage.

One view of the New Great Game is a shift to geoeconomic compared to geopolitical competition. The interest in oil and gas includes pipelines that transmit energy to China's east coast. Xiangming Chen believes that China's role is more like Britain's than Russia's in the New Great Game, where Russia plays the role that the Russian Empire originally did. Chen stated, "Regardless of the prospect, China through the BRI is deep in playing a 'New Great Game' in Central Asia that differs considerably from its historical precedent about 150 years ago when Britain and Russia jostled with each other on the Eurasian steppes." In the Carnegie Endowment, Paul Stronski and Nicole Ng wrote in 2018 that China has not fundamentally challenged any Russian interests in Central Asia.

Geopolitical attention has expanded to encompass the supply chains of critical materials, alongside competition over their production, processing, and the manufacture of clean energy technologies. China became a major producer of solar panels, batteries, and electric vehicles, and a leading processor of many critical minerals.

== Study of geopolitics ==
=== Notable Institutions ===
- Harvard Kennedy School of Government
- King's College London
- London School of Economics
- Munk School of Global Affairs
- Paul H. Nitze School of Advanced International Studies
- Georgetown School of Foreign Service
- Princeton School of Public and International Affairs
- School of International and Public Affairs at Columbia University
- Sciences Po Paris
- SOAS, University of London
- University of Cambridge
- University of Oxford
- National Resilience Institute

== See also ==
- Balkanization – Fragmentation of a country or region
- Choke point – Critical military pathway
- Eurasianism – Socio-political movement in the Russian Federation
- First island chain – First chain of archipelagos in East Asia
- Geoeconomics – Study of the interrelations of economics, geography and politics
- Geojurisprudence – Systemic approach to the connections of legal science to geography and geopolitics
- Geopolitical ontology – Type of dictionary
- Geopolitics (journal)
- Geopolitik – 19th-century German school of geostrategy
- Geostrategy – Type of foreign policy guided principally by geographical factors
- Intermediate Region – Geopolitical model set forth in the 1970s by the Greek historian Dimitri Kitsikis
- Lebensraum – 1890s–1940s German expansionist concept
- Natural gas and list of natural gas fields and Category:Natural gas pipelines
- Petroleum politics
- Political geography – Study of the spatial outcomes of political processes
- Realpolitik – Approach in diplomacy and politics
- Shatter belt – Concept in geopolitics
- Politics of outer space
- Sphere of influence – Political concept
- Strategic depth – Military term: Distance between Front lines and Key assets
- Cold War – 1947–1991 geopolitical rivalry between US and USSR
- Great Game – 19th-century Anglo-Russian confrontation
- Water politics – Politics affected by the availability of water and water resources
