= Geojurisprudence =

Systemic approach to the connections of legal science to geography and geopolitics

Geojurisprudence is "a systemic approach to the connections of legal science to geography and geopolitics".

Haushofer opened the topic in his essay "Geopolitik und Geojurisprudenz" which appeared in Zeitschrift für Völkerrecht in 1928. Here he lamented the lack of geographical understanding in German legal studies.

He said this contributed towards the general failure of the German populace to understand the nature of the First World War. He heralded Langhans-Ratzeburg as the chief representative of this new discipline, which he suggested would overcome the "thin, sterile air of legal scientific concepts and the fraudulent, political scientific, treaty-waving political posture of the so-called central powers".

With a return to putatively "German" concepts of legal relations between states, invigorated by incorporating a geographical perspective, then borders as durable legal structures rooted in geography would emerge.

With this introduction, Langhans-Ratzeburg in turn praised not only Haushofer, but also Alfred Hettner, Walther Vogel and Albert von Hoffmann for their attempts to link geography, history, politics and culture.
