= Karl Haushofer =

German general, geographer, and politician

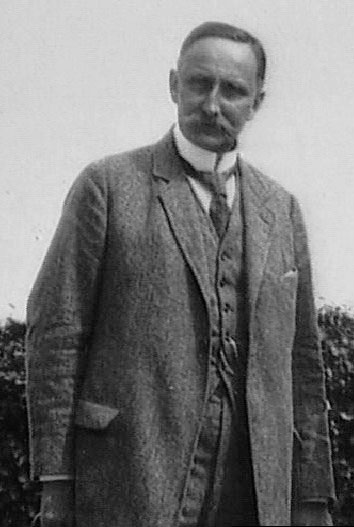
- Major General Karl Haushofer, c. 1920
- Born: Karl Ernst Haushofer; 27 August 1869; Munich, Kingdom of Bavaria
- Died: 10 March 1946 (aged 76); Pähl, Free State of Bavaria, Allied-occupied Germany
- Spouse: Martha Mayer-Doss (m. 1896; died 1946)
- Children: 2, including Albrecht Haushofer
- Military career
- Allegiance: German Empire
- Branch: Imperial German Army
- Service years: 1887–1919
- Rank: Major general
- Other work: Professor at LMU Munich

Karl Ernst Haushofer (27 August 1869 – 10 March 1946) was a German general, professor, geographer, and diplomat. Haushofer's concept of Geopolitik influenced the ideological development of Adolf Hitler and Rudolf Hess. During Hess and Hitler's incarceration by the Weimar Republic after the Beer Hall Putsch, Haushofer visited Landsberg Prison to teach and mentor both Hess and Hitler. Haushofer also coined the political use of the term Lebensraum, which Hitler also used to justify both crimes against peace and genocide. At the same time, however, Gen. Haushofer's half-Jewish wife and their children were categorized as Mischlinge under the Nuremberg Laws. Their son, Albrecht Haushofer, was issued a German Blood Certificate through the influence of Rudolf Hess, but was arrested in 1944 over his involvement with the July 20th plot to assassinate Adolf Hitler and overthrow the Nazi Party. During the last days of the war, Albrecht Haushofer was summarily executed by the SS for his role in the German Resistance.

After being interrogated by Edmund A. Walsh, who recommended to Robert H. Jackson that Haushofer be prosecuted at the Nuremberg Trials for complicity in Nazi war crimes, Karl and Martha Haushofer died together in a suicide pact outside of their home in the American Zone of Occupied Germany.

== Life and early career ==
Haushofer belonged to a family of artists and scholars. He was born in Munich to Max Haushofer Jr, a well-known professor of economics, politician and author of both academic and literary works, and Adele Haushofer (née Fraas). His grandfather was the landscape painter Max Haushofer Sr. On his graduation from the Munich Gymnasium (high school) in 1887, Haushofer entered the 1st Field Artillery regiment "Prinzregent Luitpold" of the Bavarian Army and completed Kriegsschule, Artillerieschule and Kriegsakademie. In 1896, he married Martha Mayer-Doss (1877–1946) whose father was Jewish. They had two sons, Albrecht Haushofer and Heinz Haushofer (1906–1988). In 1903, he accepted a teaching position at the Bavarian War Academy.

In November 1908, Haushofer was ordered to Tokyo as a military attaché to study the Imperial Japanese Army and as a military advisor in artillery instruction. He travelled with his wife via India and South East Asia and arrived in February 1909. He was received by Emperor Meiji and became acquainted with many important people in politics and the armed forces. In autumn 1909, he travelled with his wife for a month to Korea and Manchuria on the occasion of a railway construction. In June 1910, they returned to Germany via Russia and arrived one month later. However, shortly after returning to Bavaria, he began to suffer from a severe lung disease and was given a leave from the army for three years.

During his convalescence, from 1911 to 1913, Haushofer would work on his doctorate of philosophy from Ludwig-Maximilians-Universität München for a thesis on Japan titled Dai Nihon, Betrachtungen über Groß-Japans Wehrkraft, Weltstellung und Zukunft ("Reflections on Greater Japan's Military Strength, World Position, and Future"). He established himself as one of Germany’s foremost experts regarding the Far East, and co-founded the geopolitical monthly Zeitschrift für Geopolitik, which he would co-edit until it was suspended towards the end of World War II.

Haushofer continued his career as a professional soldier after the annexation of Bavaria by Germany, serving in the army of Imperial Germany and returning to teach War History at the Military Academy in Munich.

During World War I, he commanded a brigade on the Western Front but he was disillusioned with Germany's readiness for the tests of warfare.

When the United States entered the war, it cemented two especially bitter hatreds for Haushofer. The first was for the U.S.: America was a "deceitful, ravenous, hypocritical, shameless beast of prey", he wrote. "Americans are truly the only people on this world that I regard with a deep, instinctive hatred."

At the same time, Haushofer developed an especially virulent strain of anti-semitic feeling. In letters to his wife Martha, whose own father was Jewish, Haushofer wrote of Jewish "treason against Volk, race and country". He repeated false but common slanders alleging that Jews declined to fight for their country of citizenship, and were guilty of war profiteering.

The solution to these ills besetting Germany, he declared, would be a powerful and charismatic leader. "A man! A kingdom, an imperial crown for a man worthy of the name!" "You see how ready for a Caesar I am", he wrote in another letter to Martha, "and what kind of a good instrument I would be for a Caesar, if we had one and if he knew how to make use of me."

Haushofer would both identify and influence Germany's contemporary autocracy (although the title Führer would be used, not Kaiser). After retiring from the army with the rank of Generalmajor (major general) in 1919, he forged a friendship with the young Rudolf Hess, who became his scientific assistant and later rose to be the deputy leader of the Nazi Party, second in authority only to Hitler.

In 1919, Haushofer successfully defended his second dissertation, and became Privatdozent for political geography at Ludwig-Maximilians-Universität München, and was made a professor in 1933, although he declined a formal position and salary, because that would have affected his military pension.

== Geopolitik and relationship with Hitler ==
Haushofer entered academia with the aim of restoring and regenerating Germany. He believed the Germans' lack of geographical knowledge and geopolitical awareness to be a major cause of Germany’s defeat in World War I, because Germany had found itself with a disadvantageous alignment of allies and enemies. His specialty was to combine the fields of geography, history, economics, demography, political science, and anthropology into a new discipline that came to be called Geopolitik. Haushofer himself could not plainly describe this "new science," but its principal thrust was to view the state as a person or organism, shaped over time by its unique geography and history into a specific national character. In this context he coined the term Lebensraum – "room to live" – to describe the territory that a healthy and expanding state needed to sustain its population. This notion would be adopted by Hitler and the Nazi party in its most aggressive and militaristic interpretation.

In 1923, Hitler was jailed following his failed "Beer Hall Putsch," and Rudolf Hess surrendered to be imprisoned alongside his leader in Landsberg Prison.

Haushofer became a teacher of politics and philosophy to both Hess and Hitler. According to scholar Holger Herwig, "Like a dry sponge, Hitler soaked up what Haushofer offered."

Every Wednesday between 24 June and 12 December 1924, Prof. Dr. Haushofer made the 100-kilometer-long round trip from Munich to Landsberg. Once each morning and once each afternoon he offered what he called the "young eagles," Hess and Hitler, hours of intense personal mentoring....
"Bringing Haushofer and Hitler together," Joachim Fest, Hitler's most prolific biographer, observed, "is the most important . . . personal contribution that Rudolf Hess made to the creation and the face of National Socialism."

Haushofer's son Albrecht considered that his father's most powerful contribution to Hess and Hitler was his own substantial credibility as a soldier and scholar: "One has to imagine what it meant in the Bavaria of that time", he wrote, "when a man of my father’s stature [general and professor] and popularity constantly traveled out to Landsberg."

From 1925 to 1931 and from 1933 to 1939, Haushofer broadcast monthly radio lectures on the international political situation. That Weltpolitischer Monatsbericht made him a household name in contemporary Germany, and he came to be known in circles far removed from academia. He was a founding member of the Deutsche Akademie, of which he served as president from 1934 to 1937. He was a prolific writer, publishing hundreds of articles, reviews, commentaries, obituaries and books, many of which were on Asian topics, and he arranged for many leaders in the Nazi party and in the German military to receive copies of his works.

After the establishment of the German Nazi government, Haushofer remained friendly with Hess, who protected Haushofer's wife from the racial laws of the Nazis, which deemed her a "half-Jew". During the prewar years, Haushofer was instrumental in linking Japan to the Axis powers, acting in accordance with the theories in his book Geopolitics of the Pacific Ocean.

Under Hitler's regime, Haushofer became both rich and immensely influential, but his influence and his public profile shrank abruptly after his patron, Rudolf Hess, flew to Scotland in May 1941 in a doomed effort to make peace with the United Kingdom. Hess was purged from the Nazi Party, and the Haushofer family, with its close relationship with Hess and its Jewish background, once again came under suspicion.

In 1944 Haushofer's son Albrecht was implicated in the July 20 Plot to assassinate Hitler. Karl was arrested on 28 July 1944, and imprisoned for a month at Dachau before he was released.

Albrecht went into hiding but was arrested on 7 December 1944 and put into the Moabit prison in Berlin. Karl wrote a personal letter to Hitler pleading for mercy for his son, but never sent it. During the night of 22–23 April 1945, with only days remaining in the war, he and other prisoners, among them Klaus Bonhoeffer, were walked out of the prison by an SS death squad and shot on the orders of Joseph Goebbels. When his brother Heinz found his body, Albrecht was still clutching a sheaf of papers on which he had written dozens of poems in his last days trying to make sense of his life, his father's work, and the war. Those eighty poems were eventually published as The Moabit Sonnets. In the thirty-eighth sonnet, titled "The Father," Albrecht indicts his father for helping to unleash the horrors of Nazi brutality:

My father broke away the seal.
He did not see the rising breath of evil.
He let the demon soar into the world.

Karl Haushofer was devastated by Albrecht's death, yet even though the Nazis had murdered his son and their war had left Germany in ruins around him, Haushofer continued to blame "New York's finance Jews" for the destruction of his beloved Munich.

He was repeatedly arrested by the American forces he so detested. Beginning on 24 September 1945, Karl Haushofer was informally interrogated by Fr. Edmund A. Walsh on behalf of Nuremberg Trials prosecutor Robert H. Jackson to determine whether Haushofer should also stand trial. Fr. Walsh ultimately reported to Jackson that Haushofer was both legally and morally guilty of complicity in Nazi war crimes. Citing "the role of geopolitics in corrupting education into a preparation for war", Walsh accused Haushofer and his associates of being "basically as guilty as the better-known war criminals." In his later memoir of the Nuremberg Trials, Walsh further alleged that "The tragedy of Karl Haushofer" was his participation in the "nationalizing" of academic scholarship and of turning Geopolitik into a weapon supplying "an allegedly scientific basis and justification for international brigandage."

== Death ==
On the night of 10–11 March 1946, Karl Haushofer and his wife committed suicide in a secluded hollow on their Hartschimmelhof estate at Pähl, on the Ammersee. Both drank arsenic and his wife then hanged herself from a tree branch.

Haushofer left a detailed map to help his son, Heinz, find the bodies. In a suicide note, he declared that he wanted "no form of state or church funeral, no obituary, epitaph, or identification of my grave... I want to be forgotten and forgotten."

Fr. Walsh visited their graves and wrote in his diary, "I could not help but think of the deep tragedy of this death by night, alone, in a lonely gulley, of the last of the geopoliticians! What an inscrutable destiny, that after 19 [years of] teaching and warning [the] U.S.A. about the teachings of Haushofer, I should today be kneeling over his suicide's body in one of the loneliest spots in Bavaria!"

== Geopolitics ==
Haushofer developed Geopolitik from widely varied sources, including the writings of Oswald Spengler, Alexander Humboldt, Karl Ritter, Friedrich Ratzel, Rudolf Kjellén, and Halford J. Mackinder.

Geopolitik contributed to Nazi foreign policy chiefly in the strategy and justifications for lebensraum. The theories contributed five ideas to German foreign policy in the interwar period:

- organic state
- lebensraum
- autarky
- pan-regions
- land power/sea power dichotomy.

Geostrategy as a political science is both descriptive and analytical like political geography but adds a normative element in its strategic prescriptions for national policy. While some of Haushofer's ideas stem from earlier American and British geostrategy, German geopolitik adopted an essentialist outlook toward the national interest, oversimplifying issues and representing itself as a panacea. As a new and essentialist ideology, geopolitik resonated with the post-World War I insecurity of the populace.

Haushofer's position at the Ludwig-Maximilians-Universität München served as a platform for the spread of his geopolitical ideas, magazine articles, and books. In 1922, he founded the Institute of Geopolitics in Munich, from which he proceeded to publicize geopolitical ideas. By 1924, as the leader of the German geopolitik school of thought, Haushofer would establish the Zeitschrift für Geopolitik monthly devoted to geopolitik. His ideas would reach a wider audience with the publication of Volk ohne Raum by Hans Grimm in 1926, popularizing his concept of lebensraum. Haushofer exercised influence both through his academic teachings, urging his students to think in terms of continents and emphasizing motion in international politics, and through his political activities. While Hitler's speeches would attract the masses, Haushofer's works served to bring the remaining intellectuals into the fold.

Geopolitik was essentially a consolidation and codification of older ideas, given a scientific gloss:

- Lebensraum was a revised colonial imperialism;
- Autarky a new expression of tariff protectionism;
- Strategic control of key geographic territories exhibiting the same thought behind earlier designs on the Suez and Panama Canals; a view of controlling the land in the same way as those choke points control the sea
- Pan-regions (Panideen) based upon the British Empire, and the American Monroe Doctrine, Pan-American Union and hemispheric defense, whereby the world is divided into spheres of influence.
- Frontiers – His view of barriers between peoples not being political (borders) or natural placements of races or ethnicities but as being fluid and determined by the will or needs of ethnic/racial groups.

The key reorientation in each dyad is that the focus is on land-based empire rather than naval imperialism.

Ostensibly based upon the geopolitical theory of American naval expert Alfred Thayer Mahan, and British geographer Halford J. Mackinder, German geopolitik adds older German ideas. Enunciated most forcefully by Friedrich Ratzel and his Swedish student Rudolf Kjellén, they include an organic or anthropomorphized conception of the state, and the need for self-sufficiency through the top-down organization of society. The root of uniquely German geopolitik rests in the writings of Karl Ritter who first developed the organic conception of the state that would later be elaborated upon by Ratzel and accepted by Hausfhofer. He justified lebensraum, even at the cost of other nations' existence because conquest was a biological necessity for a state's growth.

Ratzel's writings coincided with the growth of German industrialism after the Franco-Prussian War and the subsequent search for markets that brought it into competition with Britain. His writings served as welcome justification for imperial expansion. Influenced by Mahan, Ratzel wrote of aspirations for German naval reach, agreeing that sea power was self-sustaining, as the profit from trade would pay for the merchant marine, unlike land power. Haushofer was exposed to Ratzel, who was friends with Haushofer's father, a teacher of economic geography, and would integrate Ratzel's ideas on the division between sea and land powers into his theories, saying that only a country with both could overcome this conflict.

Haushofer's geopolitik expands upon that of Ratzel and Kjellén. While the latter two conceive of geopolitik as the state as an organism in space put to the service of a leader, Haushofer's Munich school specifically studies geography as it relates to war and designs for empire. The behavioral rules of previous geopoliticians were thus turned into dynamic normative doctrines for action on lebensraum and world power.

Haushofer defined geopolitik in 1935 as "the duty to safeguard the right to the soil, to the land in the widest sense, not only the land within the frontiers of the Reich, but the right to the more extensive Volk and cultural lands." Culture itself was seen as the most conducive element to dynamic special expansion. It provided a guide as to the best areas for expansion, and could make expansion safe, whereas projected military or commercial power could not. Haushofer even held that urbanization was a symptom of a nation's decline, evidencing a decreasing soil mastery, birthrate and effectiveness of centralized rule.

To Haushofer, the existence of a state depended on living space, the pursuit of which must serve as the basis for all policies. Germany had a high population density, but the old colonial powers had a much lower density, a virtual mandate for German expansion into resource-rich areas. Space was seen as military protection against initial assaults from hostile neighbors with long-range weaponry. A buffer zone of territories or insignificant states on one's borders would serve to protect Germany. Closely linked to that need was Haushofer's assertion that the existence of small states was evidence of political regression and disorder in the international system. The small states surrounding Germany ought to be brought into the vital German order. These states were seen as being too small to maintain practical autonomy even if they maintained large colonial possessions and would be better served by protection and organization within Germany. In Europe, he saw Belgium, the Netherlands, Portugal, Denmark, Switzerland, Greece and the "mutilated alliance" of Austro-Hungary as supporting his assertion.

Haushofer's version of autarky was based on the quasi-Malthusian idea that the earth would become saturated with people and no longer able to provide food for all. There would essentially be no increases in productivity.

Haushofer and the Munich school of geopolitik would eventually expand their conception of lebensraum and autarky well past the borders of 1914 and "a place in the sun" to a New European Order, then to a New Afro-European Order, and eventually to a Eurasian Order. That concept became known as a pan-region, taken from the American Monroe Doctrine, and the idea of national and continental self-sufficiency. That was a forward-looking refashioning of the drive for colonies, something that geopoliticians did not see as an economic necessity but more as a matter of prestige, putting pressure on older colonial powers. The fundamental motivating force would be not economic but cultural and spiritual. Haushofer was, what is called today, a proponent of "Eurasianism", advocating a policy of German–Russian hegemony and alliance to offset an Anglo-American power structure's potentially dominating influence in Europe.

Beyond being an economic concept, pan-regions were a strategic concept as well. Haushofer acknowledges the strategic concept of the Heartland Theory put forward by the British geopolitician Halford Mackinder. If Germany could control Eastern Europe and subsequently Russian territory, it could control a strategic area to which hostile seapower could be denied. Allying with Italy and Japan would further augment German strategic control of Eurasia, with those states becoming the naval arms protecting Germany's insular position.

== Relationship with Nazi leaders ==
Biographers of both Haushofer and of Hitler disagree somewhat on the extent of Haushofer's influence on Hitler: Ian Kershaw writes that "[his] influence was probably greater than the Munich professor was later prepared to acknowledge," while Joachim C. Fest says that Haushofer's contributions to Hitler's ideation were important, but that "Hitler's version of [Haushofer's] ideas was distinctly his own." Haushofer told Walsh that he viewed Hitler as a half-educated man who never correctly understood the Geopolitik principles explained by Hess, and saw Foreign Minister Joachim von Ribbentrop (in office: 1938-1945) as the principal distorter of geopolitik in Hitler's mind.

Most writers on Haushofer agree that at the very least, through his teaching and his writing, he gave to Hitler and the Nazis intellectual legitimacy - providing Hitler and his cronies with a political and philosophical vocabulary that they would use to justify the goals that they pursued with war and terror. After World War II, Haushofer would deny that he had taught Hitler, and claimed that the National Socialist Party perverted Hess's study of geopolitik.

Although Haushofer accompanied Hess on numerous propaganda missions and participated in consultations between Nazis and Japanese leaders, he claimed that Hitler and the Nazis only seized upon half-developed ideas and catchwords. Furthermore, the Nazi party and government lacked any official organ that was receptive to geopolitik, leading to selective adoption and poor interpretation of Haushofer's theories. Ultimately, Hess and Konstantin von Neurath, the German Minister of Foreign Affairs (in office: 1932-1938), were the only officials Haushofer would admit had a proper understanding of geopolitik.

Father Edmund A. Walsh, professor of geopolitics and dean at Georgetown University, who interviewed Haushofer after Allied victory in preparation for the Nuremberg trials, disagreed with Haushofer's assessment that Hitler and the Nazis terribly distorted geopolitik. He cites Hitler's speeches declaring that small states have no right to exist, and the Nazi use of Haushofer's maps, language and arguments. Even if distorted somewhat, Walsh felt that was enough to implicate Haushofer's geopolitik.

Various more damning allegations about Haushofer's involvement with political extremism have been presented over the years. Louis Pauwels, in his book Monsieur Gurdjieff, describes Haushofer as a former student of the Greek-Russian mystic George Gurdjieff. Others, including Pauwels, claimed that Haushofer created a Vril society and that he was a secret member of the Thule Society. It was theorized that Haushofer had co-written, or helped to write, Mein Kampf. Rumors floated that Haushofer was Hess's father, or, conversely, that the two men were lovers. Holger dismisses these unproven allegations as "mythmaking" and "rumors."

Aware of some of these accusations, after the war Haushofer denied assisting Hitler in writing Mein Kampf, saying that he only knew of it once it was in print, and that he never read it. But Walsh found, as scholars have since, that even if Haushofer did not directly assist Hitler, discernible new elements appeared in Mein Kampf, as compared to previous speeches made by Hitler. Geopolitical ideas of lebensraum, space for depth of defense, appeals for natural frontiers, balancing land and seapower, and geographic analysis of military strategy entered Hitler's thought between his imprisonment and the publishing of Mein Kampf. Chapter XIV, on German policy in Eastern Europe, in particular displays the influence of the materials Haushofer brought Hitler and Hess while they were imprisoned. Hans Frank, the governor general of wartime Poland, quoted Hitler as telling him, "Landsberg was my university education at state expense."

Haushofer was never a member of the Nazi Party, and did voice disagreements with the party. Haushofer came under suspicion because of his contacts with left-wing socialist figures within the Nazi movement (led by Gregor Strasser) and because of his advocacy of essentially a German–Russian alliance. The Nazi left-wing had some connections to the Communist Party of Germany and some of its leaders, especially those who were influenced by the National Bolshevist philosophy of a German–Russian revolutionary alliance, as advocated by Ernst Niekisch (1889-1967), Julius Evola (1898-1974), Ernst Jünger (1895-1998), Friedrich Hielscher (1902-1990) and other figures of the "conservative revolution". Haushofer did profess loyalty to the Führer and make anti-Semitic remarks. However, his emphasis was always on space over race; he believed in environmental rather than racial determinism. In contrast to his personal hostility towards Jews, he declined to associate himself with anti-Semitism as a state policy, especially because his wife was half-Jewish. Haushofer claimed that after 1933 much of what he wrote was distorted under duress: his wife had to be protected by Hess's influence (who managed to have her awarded "honorary German" status).), and his son and grandson were imprisoned for two and a half months.

Several authors have explored more obscure angles on the contact between Haushofer and the Nazi establishment. Suggestions such as Haushofer's connection to Gurdjieff's occultism, or that he had studied Zen Buddhism, or had been initiated at the hands of Tibetan lamas – are subject of debate.

The influence of Haushofer on Nazi ideology is dramatized in the 1943 short documentary propaganda film, Plan for Destruction, which was nominated for an Academy Award.

== Works ==
- Das Japanische Reich in seiner geographischen Entwicklung. Wien: L. W. Seidel & Sohn, 1921.
- Geopolitik des Pazifischen Ozeans: Studien über die Wechselbeziehungen zwischen Geographie und Geschichte. Heidelberg: Kurt Vowinckel Verlag, 1925; Bremen: Dogma, 2013.
- Bausteine zur Geopolitik. Heidelberg: Kurt Vowinckel Verlag, 1928.
- Weltpolitik von heute. Berlin: Zeitgeschichte-Verlag Wilhelm Undermann, 1934 (online).
- Napoleon I. Lübeck: Coleman, 1935.
- Kitchener. Lübeck: Coleman, 1935.
- Foch. Lübeck: Coleman, 1935
- Weltmeere und Weltmächte. Berlin: Zeitgeschichte-Verlag, 1937.
- Deutsche Kulturpolitik im indopazifischen Raum. Hamburg: Hoffmann und Campe, 1939.
- Geopolitische Grundlagen. Berlin and Wien: Industrieverlag Spaeth & Linde, 1939.
- Grenzen in ihrer geographischen und politischen Bedeutung. Heidelberg, Berlin and Magdeburg: Vowinckel, 1939.
- Wehr-Geopolitik: Geographische Grundlagen einer Wehrkunde. Berlin: Junker und Dünnhaupt, 1941.
- Japan baut sein Reich. Berlin: Zeitgeschichte-Verlag Wilhelm Undermann, 1941.
- Das Werden des deutschen Volkes: Von der Vielfalt der Stämme zur Einheit der Nation. Berlin: Propyläen-Verlag, 1941.
- Der Kontinentalblock : Mitteleuropa, Eurasien, Japan. Berlin: Eher, 1941.
- Das Reich: Großdeutsches Werden im Abendland. Berlin: Habel, 1943.
- De la géopolitique. Paris: Fayard, 1986.
- English Translation and Analysis of Major General Karl Ernst Haushofer's Geopolitics of the Pacific Ocean: Studies on the Relationship between Geography and History. Lewiston, New York and Lampeter, Wales: Edwin Mellen Press, 2002. ISBN 0-7734-7122-7.

== See also ==
- Geojurisprudence
- Intermediate Region
- Alfred Pringsheim
- Nazi Ideologues, Philosophers, and Sociologists
