= Edmund A. Walsh =

American Jesuit priest and diplomat

The Reverend Edmund A. Walsh SJ
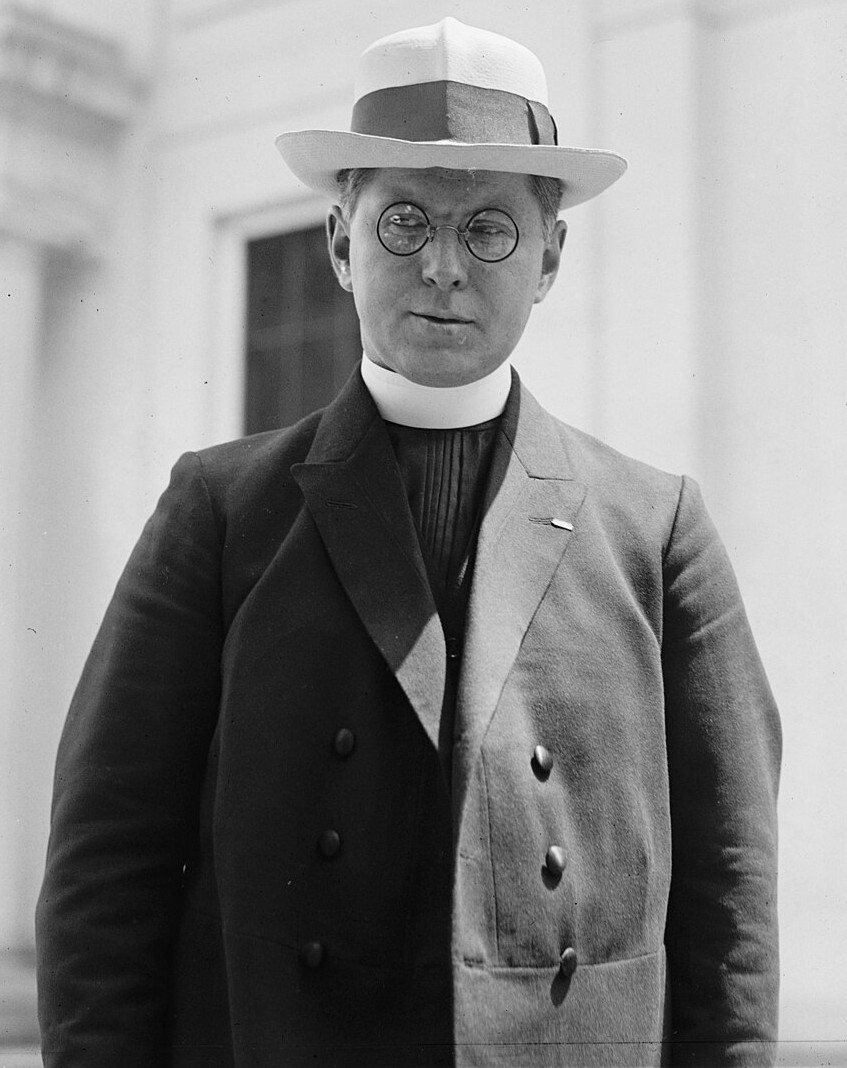
- Walsh in 1922
- Born: October 10, 1885; South Boston, Massachusetts, U.S.
- Died: October 31, 1956 (aged 71); Washington, D.C., U.S.
- Education: Georgetown University (AB); Woodstock College (MA)

Orders
- Ordination: June 28, 1916

Edmund Aloysius Walsh SJ (October 10, 1885 – October 31, 1956) was an American Roman Catholic priest of the Society of Jesus and career diplomat from South Boston, Massachusetts. He was also a professor of geopolitics and founder of the Georgetown University School of Foreign Service, the first school for international affairs in the United States. He founded the school in 1919, six years before the U.S. Foreign Service existed, and served as its first regent.

After experiencing Soviet anti-religious persecution through his role as the head of the American and Papal humanitarian missions during the Russian famine of 1921, Walsh became widely known as a public intellectual who spoke and wrote extensively about intolerant Marxist-Leninist atheism, the Gulag, Soviet war crimes, and other human rights abuses, and as a rhetorician who supported international religious freedom and the rule of law.

In addition to his role as an investigator of Nazi war crimes and religious persecution while working as an assistant to Robert H. Jackson during the Nuremberg trial, Walsh played a major role in raising public awareness of human rights abuses under both Far Left and Far Right police states.

Fr. Walsh was a confidant of multiple Presidents and other senior members of America's traditionally anti-Catholic White Anglo-Saxon Protestant elite, at a time when both Catholics and Americans of White ethnic ancestry were still being denied social acceptance in the United States.

More than a decade after his death, Walsh became famous once again, when he was alleged by Roy Cohn to have been the man whose opinion Senator Joseph McCarthy from Wisconsin had first sought before going public with allegations provided by U.S. counterintelligence that the Soviet Union's KGB and the GRU had recruited moles throughout the U.S. Federal Government and propagandists throughout the entertainment industry. Cohn denied knowing anything further about the alleged conversation between Senator McCarthy and Walsh, or what advice if any Walsh provided.

Some historians claim that Walsh, rather than Senator McCarthy, deserves to be remembered as the greatest American Catholic anti-communist of the 20th century.

== Early life and education ==
Walsh was born on October 10, 1885, in South Boston, Massachusetts. The youngest of six siblings, his father, John Francis Walsh, was a career police officer in the Boston Police Department, and his mother, Catherine J. (née Noonan) Walsh, emigrated from Ireland to the United States with her family as a young girl. Walsh grew up in South Boston, where one of his childhood friends included his future Jesuit colleague, Louis J. Gallagher.

Walsh first attended a public grammar school, before receiving a scholarship to attend Boston College High School in 1898. After his graduation in 1902, he decided to enter the Society of Jesus, matriculating at the Jesuit novitiate in Frederick, Maryland, on August 14 of that year. When the novitiate relocated from Frederick to St. Andrew-on-Hudson in Poughkeepsie, New York, in January 1903, Walsh moved with it. He professed his first vows there in 1904, and then began three years of philosophical studies at Woodstock College in Maryland.

From 1909 to 1912, during his Jesuit formation, Walsh taught literature at what was then the preparatory division of Georgetown University. He was present at the dedication of the statue of John Carroll on Georgetown's campus in May 1912, and was influenced by Chief Justice Edward Douglas White's speech about the common principles underlying the founding of the United States and Georgetown University. Walsh was awarded a Bachelor of Arts degree from Georgetown.

In September 1912, the Jesuit superiors sent Walsh to Europe for graduate studies. He began to study the classics at University College Dublin, but he was forced to withdraw because the academic senate declined to recognize his bachelor's degree from Georgetown. In March 1913, he began a similar program at the University of London. However, several months later, the Jesuit provincial superior directed Walsh to commence his theological studies, which he began in September of that year at the University of Innsbruck.

In August 1914, with the outbreak of the First World War, Walsh's studies there were interrupted. He instead returned to Woodstock College to continue his theological studies. He was ordained a priest on June 28, 1916, and then spent one year engaged in pastoral work in New York City. Walsh then returned to Woodstock to complete his theological studies, and was awarded a Master of Arts degree.

He later received a D.Litt. from Georgetown University, as well as an LL.D. from the University of Delaware.

== Georgetown University ==
On May 5, 1918, Walsh became the prefect of studies (dean) of the Georgetown University College of Arts & Sciences, succeeding John B. Creeden. Walsh held this position only for one year, and was succeeded by W. Coleman Nevils. In 1919, given the Jesuits' recently established policy that the deans and presidents of all Jesuit colleges should possess doctorates, Walsh was awarded an honorary Doctor of Philosophy degree from Georgetown.

During World War I he served special duties as assistant educational director to the "Students' Army Training Corps."

After the Armistice of November 11, 1918, Georgetown University established a School of Foreign Service and appointed Walsh to lead it. The school, which was the first of its kind, was intended to advance international peace by training diplomats, businessmen, bankers, and merchants with an education focused on international relations. University president John B. Creeden employed Walsh as the school's first Regent. Classes began in October 1919. and the first class graduated in 1921. After founding the school, Walsh continued to lead the school for several decades: his leadership of the school coincided with a high point in the American study of geopolitics, in parallel to the work of Isaiah Bowman and Nicholas Spykman. The School of Foreign Service was named for him in 1958, shortly after his death.

== Relief missions to Russia ==
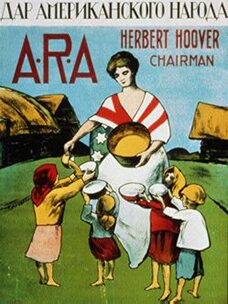
1921 American Relief Administration poster saying "The Gift of the American People" in Russian

In 1922, while studying political science, Walsh received appointment as Catholic representative to the American Relief Administration, also known as the "Hoover Mission", during the Russian famine of 1921. Walsh arrived in Moscow in March 1922 to serve the mission. In June 1922, however, Pope Pius XI also appointed Walsh as director general of the Papal Relief Mission, during which time he "conducted extensive negotiations with the Soviet leaders of that time on behalf of Catholic interests in Russia."

Upon his arrival in Russia, Fr. Walsh began friendships and close collaboration in famine relief work with the main leaders of the Catholic Church in Russia; Archbishop Jan Cieplak, Monsignor Konstanty Budkiewicz, and Exarch Leonid Feodorov. Exarch Leonid Feodorov, Metropolitan Andrey Sheptytsky's newly appointed administrator of the Russian Greek Catholic Church, had already participated in discussions with Orthodox clergy, including Patriarch Tikhon of Moscow and Metropolitan Benjamin of Petrograd. At the time, Patriarch Tikhon was faced with the ongoing Soviet-backed Living Church Schism and was determined defend the hard-won independence of the Moscow Patriarchate from again being lost to control by the State. For this reason, Patriarch Tikhon was both meeting regularly to discuss with both the Exarch and with Father Vladimir Abrikosov the possible transformation of the Russian Orthodox Church into one of the Eastern Catholic Churches. The Patriarch had also been urging those Orthodox clergy and laity who remained loyal to him to similarly meet with the Russian Catholics in order to discuss the possible reunion of the Russian Orthodox Church with the Holy See under the terms laid down at the Council of Florence in 1439.

This was why, when Fr. Walsh and the first Exarch of the Russian Greek Catholic Church first met one another and conversed in Ecclesiastical Latin, Feodorov, who admired Patriarch Tikhon and his followers and felt only contempt for the so-called Living Church, urged that the Famine Relief food supplies be entrusted not only to Catholic clergy, but also to those Russian Orthodox priests who remained loyal to Patriarch Tikhon for distribution to the starving. Fr. Walsh enthusiastically agreed with the Exarch's idea and ensured that it was carried out. In Orenburg alone, Fr. Louis Gallagher hosted six local Russian Orthodox bishops to his table to organize the delivery of food supplies to the starving.

According to historian Paul Gabel, "By early October the mission was at work. By its own accounts it established hundreds of food kitchens in the Crimea and many more reaching as far north as Moscow and Petrograd. Eventually it gave daily food rations to over 160,000 people in over 400 localities and employed 2,500 Russians as workers at the stations. At its peak in the summer of 1923, it had created clothing and boot-making factories, donated money to sanitaria for children with tuberculosis, and imported medical supplies to combat typhus and malaria, ultimately spending the equivalent of $1.5 million on all programs. This effort can, of course, be construed as magnanimity or opportunism - the latter interpretation favored by many Orthodox Hierarchs and clergy."

Meanwhile, Fr. Walsh and Archbishop Jan Cieplak also succeeded in securing the surrender of the Relics of St. Andrew Bobola, which had been confiscated from their shrine at Polotsk and placed in an anti-religious museum by the Soviet Government. The relics were then transported to the Church of the Gesù in Rome by Walsh's childhood friend and assistant director, Louis J. Gallagher, who later published biographies of both Walsh and St. Andrew Bobola.

During his time in Russia, Walsh became militantly and vocally anti-Communist, first through his close friendships with Archbishop Cieplak, Monsignor Budkiewicz, and Exarch Leonid Feodorov and then having been a horrified eye-witness to their 1923 show trial prosecution by Nikolai Krylenko for anti-Soviet agitation during the First Soviet anti-religious campaign. To raise global awareness of anti-Catholicism in the Soviet Union, Fr. Walsh, his aides, and Captain Francis McCullagh translated into English the trial transcripts they had recorded in shorthand and sent them abroad, where they were published by the New York Herald and La Civiltà Cattolica.

On 10 April 1923, People's Commissar for Foreign Affairs Georgy Chicherin wrote a letter to fellow Politburo member Joseph Stalin, which described the political fallout from Fr. Walsh's successful efforts to globally publicize both the Cieplak show trial and the execution of Monsignor Konstanty Budkiewicz inside Moscow's Lubyanka Prison on Easter Sunday, 1923. In America, France, and the United Kingdom, efforts to gain diplomatic recognition for the USSR had suffered a major setback. In Westminster, Labour MPs had been flooded by petitions "demanding the defense of Cieplak and Budkiewicz", by "worker's organizations", "dying socialists", and "professionalists". In the United States, Republican Senator William Borah had been about to discuss possible recognition of the USSR with U.S. Secretary of State Charles Evans Hughes. Due to both the trial and Monsignor Budkiewicz's subsequent execution, the meeting had been cancelled and the senator had been forced to indefinitely postpone the founding of a committee to press for diplomatic negotiations. Chicherin explained that the outside world saw the continuing anti-religious campaign "as nothing other than naked religious persecution." Chicherin expressed fear that, if Russian Orthodox Patriarch Tikhon were similarly tried and sentenced to death, the news would, "worsen much further our international position in all our relations." He concluded by proposing "the rejection in advance of the death sentence on Tikhon".

One Catholic Bishop in the Second Polish Republic had called the famine relief mission and its employees "missionaries" and many Orthodox and Left Wing conspiracy theorists have alleged the same both at the time and many times over the century since. Despite the roles played by Fr. Walsh and Captain McCullagh in saving his life and the role of the Vatican's Secretariat of State in successfully demanding his release from incarceration in June 1923, Patriarch Tikhon immediately responded by angrily accusing the Papal relief mission of proselytizing the Orthodox Church and called upon the Russian people to resist what he now termed a "Catholic invasion". The Patriarch's interpretation of the facts is not, according to historians Paul Gabel and James J. Zatko, supported by the existing historical evidence.

According to Paul Gabel, "Walsh had said publicly that the Papal Relief Mission was to scrupulously avoid religious propaganda; the Mission was under strict orders from both the Bolsheviks and the Vatican not to proselytize. Even Communion for relief workers was to be held behind closed doors... Many observers claimed the mission stuck to the terms of the agreement, but others wrote that missionaries brought along colored photographs of the Pope to hang in plain view in relief centers as the hungry were belong fed. In October 1923, some Catholics connected to the mission were forced out of the country, allegedly for proselytizing. The very word missionary was obviously ambiguous. In any case they provided food for the hungry and medical aid for the sick of all religions and nationalities on a nondiscriminatory basis. (Of course, dedicated conspiracy theorists would just see nondiscrimination as a greater opportunity for religious imperialism)."

In a 16 November 1923 letter to the British Foreign Office, Walsh described the recent joint GPU and Red Army nighttime raid upon the Moscow Byzantine Rite Dominican convent and illegal Catholic school led by Mother Catherine Abrikosova, followed in the early morning by the arrest of the mother prioress and the sisters. Walsh also described the simultaneous raids and mass arrests of the priests and laity of the Russian Greek Catholic Church throughout Moscow. A copy of Walsh's letter was acquired by the U.S. State Department and landed across the desk of U.S. Secretary of State Charles Evans Hughes, who was still keeping a very close watch over religious persecution in the Soviet Union. Therefore, Walsh's letter very likely played a role in Hughes' continued decision to refuse to grant diplomatic recognition to the U.S.S.R.

Following his return to the United States, Walsh commissioned a painting of Exarch Leonid Feodorov from Russian refugee artist Paul Maltzev. The painting was based on a photograph taken of the Exarch as a political prisoner at Solovki concentration camp, located above the Arctic Circle. The painting hung in Fr. Walsh's office at Georgetown University for the rest of his life and he always spoke of the first Exarch of the Russian Greek Catholic Church with a deep sense of reverence.

Fr. Walsh's experiences during the Soviet anti-religious campaign represented a turning point in his life and he continued to vigorously promote anti-Communism throughout the rest of his life and career.

Soviet Foreign Commissar Georgii Chicherin very likely had the efforts of Fr. Walsh and Captain Francis McCullagh in mind when he confided years later in Bishop Michel d'Herbigny, "We Communists feel sure we can triumph over London Capitalism. But Rome will prove a harder nut to crack... Without Rome, religion would die. But Rome sends out, for the service of her religion, propagandists of every nationality. They are more effective than guns. It is certain it will be a long struggle."

== Later life ==
Walsh professed his fourth vow on March 27, 1924.

During the Cristero War, Walsh worked as a diplomat on behalf of the Vatican to resolve the persecution of the Catholic Church in Mexico by the similarly Far Left single party state that Plutarco Elías Calles had imposed upon the Mexican Government. Walsh also negotiated with the Kingdom of Iraq to establish a Baghdad College, a Jesuit-run Catholic High School in Baghdad in 1931.

On December 5, 1938, Walsh spoke at an ecumenical conference in Washington whose focus was to combat religious and racial intolerance.

In October 1941, Walsh publicly criticized U.S. President Franklin Delano Roosevelt for claiming that the Soviet Government was following its Constitution's guarantees against religious persecution.

After the Allies' victory in World War II, Walsh served as Consultant to the U.S. Chief of Counsel Robert H. Jackson at the Nuremberg Trials. Walsh particularly worked in helping Jackson gather evidence of Nazi religious persecution of German, Austrian, and Polish Christians. One of his duties was to interrogate retired Imperial German Army General and former Ludwig-Maximilians-Universität München professor Karl Haushofer to determine whether he should be prosecuted for complicity in Nazi war crimes. Haushofer's academic philosophy of Geopolitik was suspected to have helped to justify both crimes against peace and the Holocaust. Walsh ultimately reported to Jackson that Haushofer was both legally and morally guilty of war crimes. Citing, "the role of geopolitics in corrupting education into a preparation for war", Walsh considered Haushofer and his academic associates, "basically as guilty as the better-known war criminals." In his later memoir of the Nuremberg Trials, Walsh further alleged that, "The tragedy of Karl Haushofer", was his participation in the, "nationalizing", of academic scholarship and weaponizing geopolitics to create, "an allegedly scientific basis and justification for international brigandage."

After Haushofer and his wife committed suicide in March 1946, Walsh visited their graves and wrote in his diary, "I could not help but think of the deep tragedy of this death by night, alone, in a lonely gulley, of the last of the geopoliticians! What an inscrutable destiny, that after 19 [years of] teaching and warning [the] U.S.A. about the teachings of Haushofer, I should today be kneeling over his suicide's body in one of the loneliest spots in Bavaria!"

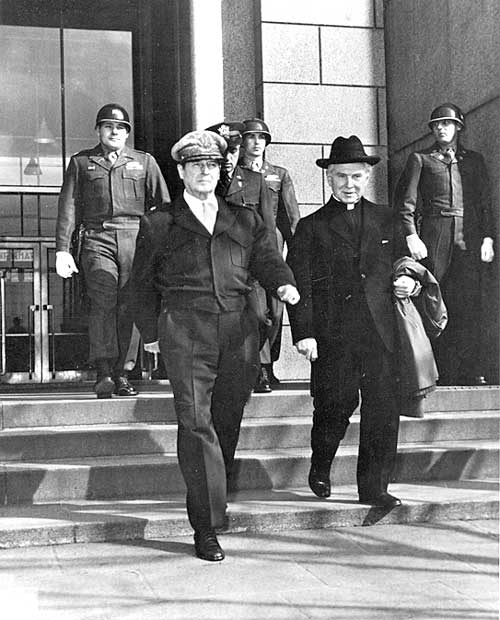
Walsh (front right) with Douglass MacArthur (front left) in Tokyo, 1948

In Total Power: A Footnote to History, Walsh's 1948 account of his role in the Nuremberg Trials, Walsh accused the single party states in Nazi Germany and the Soviet Union of embodying the concept of, "power without law." Therefore, the prosecution of those responsible for Nazi war crimes raised a much deeper issue about the roots of totalitarianism in all forms, "What one really beheld in the prisoners' dock at Nuremberg was a logical devolution in the despiritualizing of modern culture and the ultimate expression of an unbalanced and perverted humanism."

== Death ==
Walsh died of a cerebral hemorrhage on October 31, 1956, at the age of 71, at Georgetown University Hospital.

In its obituary, the New York Times remembered Walsh as founder of the School of Foreign Service. The Times added:

Father Walsh was a long-time leader in the fight against world communism. By the spoken and written word, and with every force at his command, he had uncompromisingly opposed it since the day in 1923 when he returned from Moscow after heading the Paper Relief Mission to the Soviet Union for more than a year.

President Dwight D. Eisenhower sent a letter to Georgetown University when Walsh died in 1956, which read in part:

The death of Father Walsh is a grievous loss to the Society in which he served so many years, to the educational and religious life of the United States and to the free people of the Western world. For four decades, he was a vigorous and inspiring champion of freedom for mankind and independence for nations... at every call to duty, all his energy of leadership and wisdom of counsel were devoted to the service of the United States.

== Legacy ==
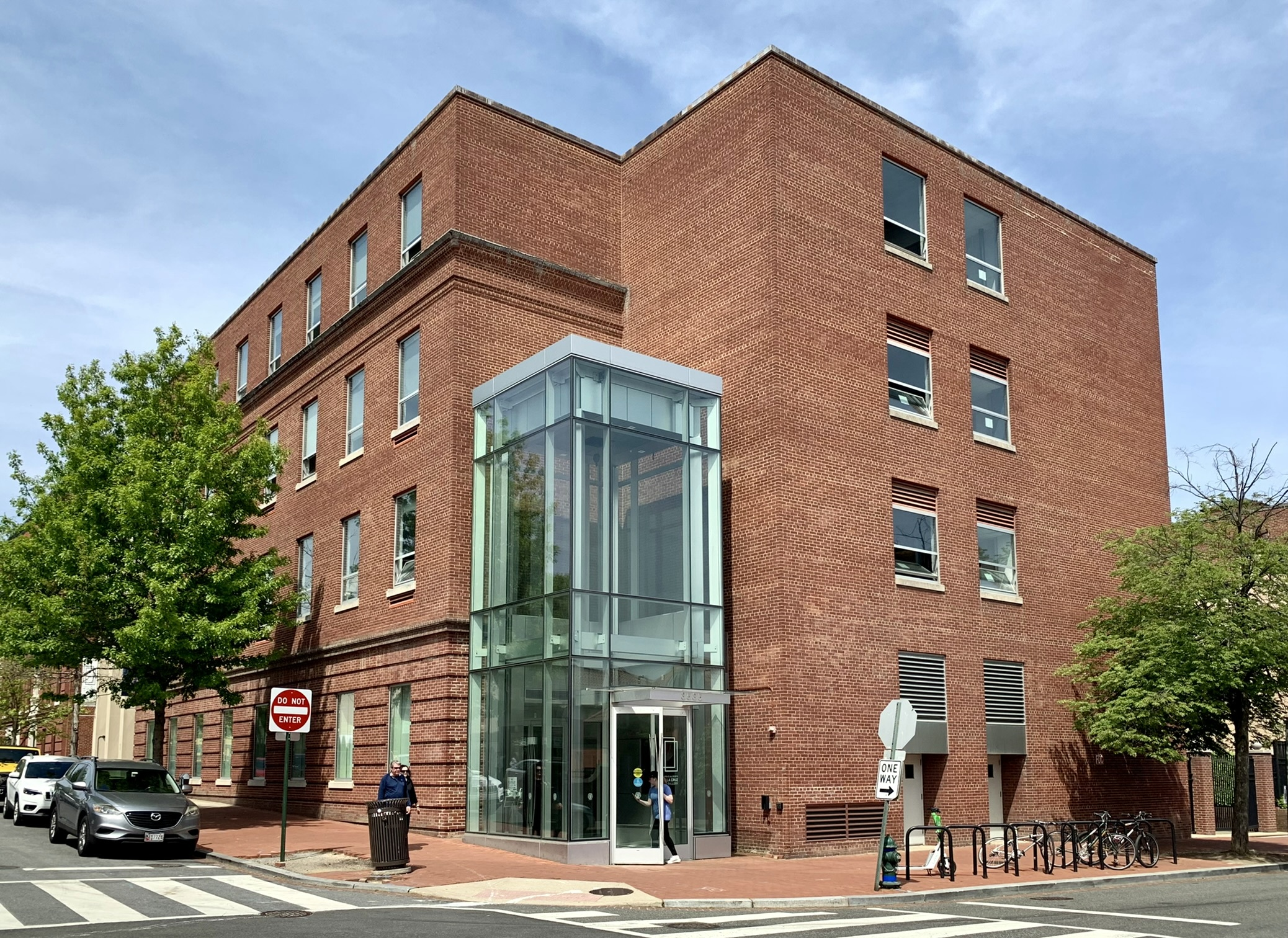
The Edmund A. Walsh Building.

After his death in 1956, a new academic building constructed to house the School of Foreign Service was named the Edmund A. Walsh Memorial Building in his memory.

Walsh's most enduring legacy is the school he founded, which has become an incubator of leadership in the United States and internationally. Graduates of the School have included U.S. President Bill Clinton, U.S. President Barack Obama's Chief of Staff Denis McDonough, U.S. President Donald Trump's Chief of Staff Mick Mulvaney and the leaders of the U.S. intelligence community (George Tenet), the American labor movement (AFL-CIO President Lane Kirkland), the American Catholic Church (New York Cardinal Archbishop John Joseph O'Connor), the Chairman of the largest corporation by revenue in the world (Greg Penner of Walmart) and one of the ten richest persons in the world Antonio Gracias of SpaceX. Heads of state educated at the School have included King Abdullah of Jordan, King Felipe VI of Spain, and Gloria Macapagal Arroyo of the Philippines.

The school has been home to several prominent faculty members including the historians Carroll Quigley, and Jules Davids, the political scientist, and World War II hero Jan Karski, and the first woman Secretary of State Madeleine Albright. On May 29, 2012, both Karski (posthumously) and Albright received the Presidential Medal of Freedom from U.S. President Barack Obama.

In 2023, a controversial proposal to rename the Georgetown School of Foreign Service after Madeleine Albright over Fr. Walsh's alleged role in McCarthyism received criticism from Georgetown students. They argued in a petition of their own that Fr. Walsh cannot be blamed for McCarthyism and that the legacy of the School of Foreign Service's founding Dean deserves to be celebrated rather than minimized. Others including students, faculty, and alumni, have argued against the name change based on both opposition to Albright's diplomatic policies and admiration for Fr. Walsh's role in defense of global religious freedom and other human rights. On 10 October 2023, Georgetown University announced that the replacement of Fr. Edmund A. Walsh's name with that of Madeleine Albright was no longer under consideration, but that an alternative means of honoring Albright was still being sought.

== Works ==
=== Books ===
- The History and Nature of International Relations. Georgetown Foreign Service Series. New York: Macmillan Co. 1922. LCCN 22003102. OCLC 587383 – via Google Books.
- Fall of the Russian Empire: The Story of the Last f the Romanovs and the Coming of the Bolsheviki. Boston: Little, Brown and Company. 1928. LCCN 28013121. OCLC 6870254.
- Why Pope Pius XI Asked Prayers for Russia on March 19, 1930: A Review of the Facts in the Case Together with Proofs of the International Program of the Soviet Government. New York: Catholic Near East Welfare Association. 1930. LCCN 30012400. OCLC 3883110.
- Last Stand: An Interpretation of the Soviet Five-Year Plan. Boston: Little, Brown, and Company. 1931. LCCN 31026706. OCLC 415049.
- Ships and National Safety: The Role of a Merchant Marine in Balanced Economy. Washington, D.C.: Georgetown University School of Foreign Service. 1934. OCLC 2868749.
- Wood Carver of Tyrol. New York: Harper & Brothers. 1935. OCLC 11630192.
- Total Power: A Footnote to History. Garden City, NY: Doubleday. 1948. LCCN 48006923. OCLC 880297 – via Internet Archive.
- Total Empire: The Roots and Progress of World Communism. Milwaukee: Bruce. 1951. OCLC 1478385.
- "Geopolitics and International Morals," in Compass of the New World, Hans Weigert and Vilhjalmur Stefansson, eds., New York: Macmillan, 1944. OCLC 255514571

=== Articles ===
- "Soviet Geopolitics and Strategy". Naval War College Review. 4 (7). September 1951. Archived from the original on June 26, 2023 – via U.S. Naval War College.
- "The Mystery of Haushofer," Life Magazine, 16 September 1946, pp. 107–120.

== See also ==
- Michel d'Herbigny
- Evalyn Walsh McLean

Academic offices
Preceded by John B. Creeden	34th Prefect of Studies of the Georgetown University College of Arts & Sciences; 1918	Succeeded by W. Coleman Nevils
