= Benjamin of Petrograd =

Bishop in the Russian Orthodox Church

Saint Benjamin of Petrograd
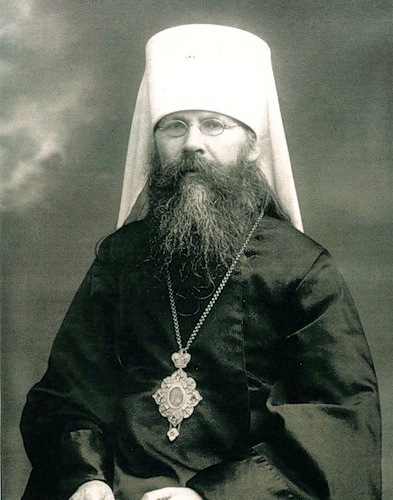
- Benjamin (Kazansky), Metropolitan of Petrograd and Gdov

Hieromartyr
- Born: 29 April [O.S. 17 April] 1873; Olonets Governorate, Russian Empire
- Died: 13 August [O.S. 31 July] 1922; Kovalevsky Forest, Soviet Union
- Venerated in: Eastern Orthodoxy
- Canonized: 4 April 1992, Danilov Monastery, Moscow, Russian Federation by Russian Orthodox Church
- Major shrine: Nikolskoe Cemetery of the Alexander Nevsky Lavra
- Feast: 31 July; Sunday on or following 25 January (the celebration of the Synaxis of the new Russian martyrs and confessors)

Benjamin of Petrograd (Russian: Вениамин Петроградский, Veniamin Petrogradsky, 29 April [O.S. 17 April] 1873 – 13 August [O.S. 31 July] 1922), born Vasily Pavlovich Kazansky (Russian: Василий Павлович Казанский), was a hieromartyr under Soviet anti-religious persecution, a bishop in the Russian Orthodox Church and eventually Metropolitan of Petrograd and Gdov from 1917 to 1922. Due to his role in leading nonviolent resistance to Soviet anti-religious legislation, Metropolitan Benjamin was martyred following a drumhead show trial and executed by a firing squad of the Soviet secret police. In April 1992 Benjamin was glorified (canonized) by the Russian Orthodox Church together with several other martyrs, including Archimandrite Sergius (Shein), Professor Yury Novitsky, and John Kovsharov (a lawyer), who were executed alongside him.

== Early life ==
Benjamin was born to a priestly family in the pogost (village) of Nimenskii in the Andreevskii volost of the Kargopolsky Uyezd near Arkhangelsk in the Olonets Governorate in the northwest of the Russian Empire.

He graduated from the Olonets Theological Seminary in 1893 and earned his candidate of theology degree from the St. Petersburg Spiritual Academy in 1897, defending a thesis on Archbishop Arcadius of Olonets' anti-heretical activities. In 1895 he was tonsured a monk and given the name Benjamin; later that year he was ordained a hierodeacon (deacon-monk) and the following year he was ordained a hieromonk (priest-monk).

Following his graduation he taught sacred scripture at the Riga Theological Seminary (1897–1898) following which he was inspector of the Kholm Theological Seminary (1898–1899) and the St. Petersburg Spiritual Academy (1899–1902). In 1902 he became rector of the Samara Theological Seminary and he was bestowed with the rank of archimandrite. In 1905 he became rector of the St. Petersburg Spiritual Academy.

== Vicar Bishop ==
On 6 February [O.S. 24 January] 1910 Benjamin was consecrated Bishop of Gdov, a vicar bishop of the diocese of St. Petersburg. Metropolitan Antonii (Vadkovskii) of St. Petersburg and Ladoga officiated at the installment in the Alexander Nevsky Lavra in St. Petersburg. Benjamin often served in the churches of the poorest and most remote suburbs of the capital and led the annual Easter and Christmas divine services at Putilovsky and Obukhovsky factories of St. Petersburg, and organized the charitable foundation of the Mother of God for the Care of Abandoned Women. He was known as "the indefatigable bishop".

== Metropolitan of Petrograd ==
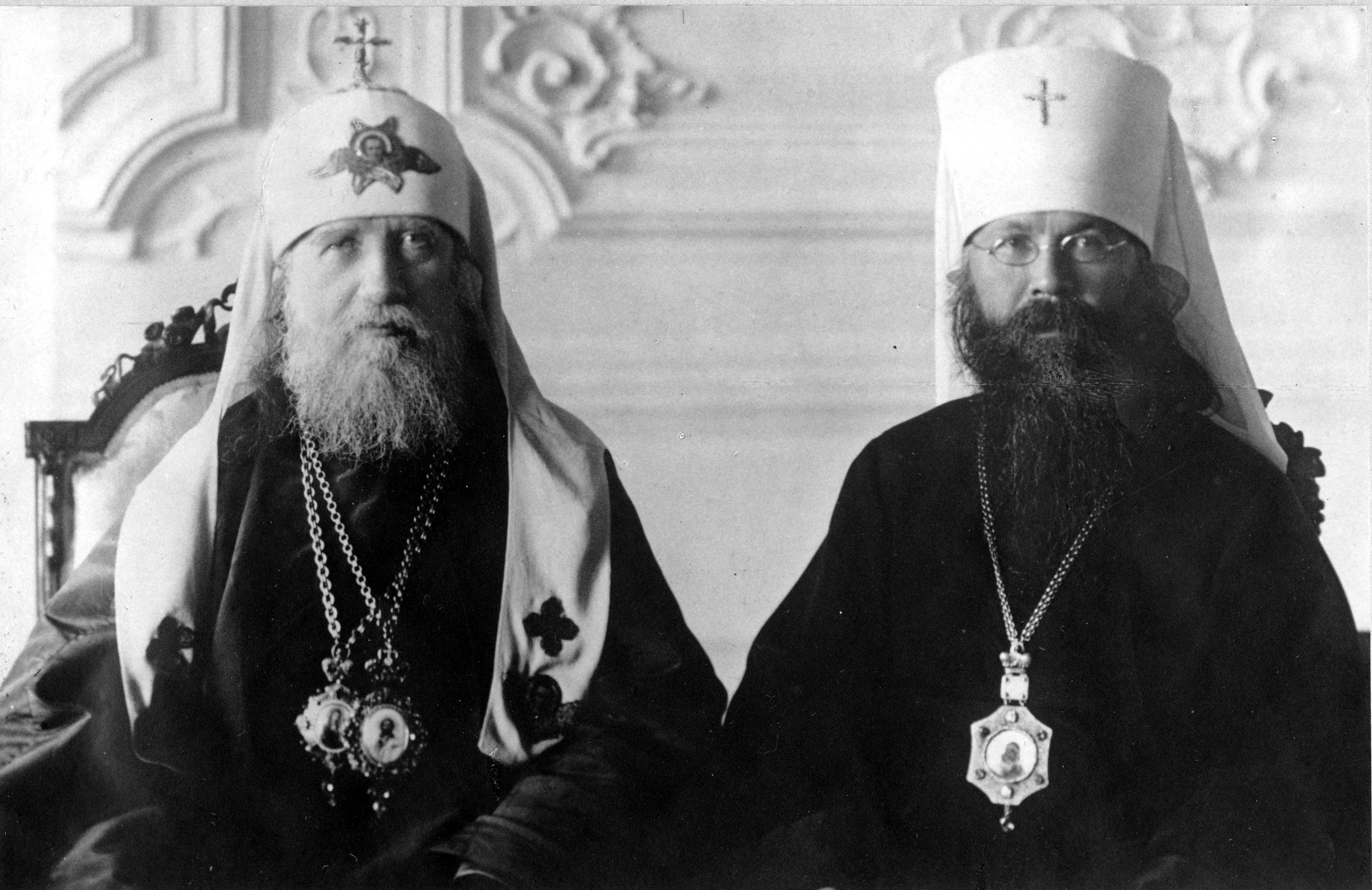
Patriarch Tikhon and Metropolitan Benjamin

After the arrest and deposition of Metropolitan Pitirim (Onkova) on 15 March [O.S. 2 March] 1917, Benjamin administered the Petrograd diocese as vicarial Bishop of Gdov. On 6 June [O.S. 24 May] of that year, he was democratically elected by the clergy and the people to the archbishopric of Petrograd and Ladoga, the first bishop popularly elected in the Russian church. On 30 June [O.S. 17 June] his title was changed to Archbishop of Petrograd and Gdov by decree of the Holy Synod, and on 26 August [O.S. 13 August] he was elevated to metropolitan.

According to future Soviet dissident Dmitri Likhachev, who was then a devoutly Orthodox layman in Petrograd, "Persecution of the Church began almost contemporaneously with the October cataclysm. This was so intolerable for any Russian that many unbelievers began to go to church, distancing themselves psychologically from the persecutors."

In a letter from Petrograd to Pope Pius XI, Fr. Leonid Feodorov, the first Exarch of the Russian Greek Catholic Church, praised the Orthodox religious revival being masterminded by the new Metropolitan, "These [Orthodox] priests, who formerly seemed to have been struck by dumbness, are today preaching quite well and teaching the Christian doctrine. Under the auspices of some churches, women have also organized study centers were religious subjects are being taught in a very simple manner: Holy Scripture, history of the Church, patrology, dogmatic and moral theology, apologetics, and liturgy. Needless to say, similar activity does not exist in the villages or in the smaller towns, and yet once ignited, the flame of religious fervor spreads rapidly everywhere."

Even though many Russian Orthodox bishops and lower clergy enthusiastically supported the anti-communist White Movement during the Russian Civil War, Metropolitan Benjamin chose to maintain a purely apolitical stance. For example, during the anti-religious campaign at the height of the Russian Civil War, the Metropolitan made the offer that if the Soviet State withheld from seizing or otherwise desecrating the relics of St Alexander Nevsky, that he would suspend any Orthodox priest in his Diocese who aided the White Movement.

Unfortunately, the Russian Orthodox Church and Soviet State had diametrically opposite world views. What is worse, all religions were viewed as dangerous counter-revolutionary ideologies that must be eliminated completely through religious persecution and coercively replaced with Marxist-Leninist atheism.

In a 1918 article about the ongoing Soviet anti-religious campaign, Isaak Babel described how he attended an anti-Christian polemical lecture by a senior official of the Party's League of Militant Atheists. Inside the former Great Hall of the Winter Palace, however, Babel witnessed as the Atheist speaker lectured about, "The All-forgiving Persona of Christ and Vomiting up the Anathema of Christianity" while being loudly heckled by Orthodox members of the audience. Babel then attended a Russian Orthodox Divine Liturgy inside the overwhelmingly crowded Cathedral of Our Lady of Kazan on Nevsky Prospect. About the Liturgy, Babel recalled, "In his sermon the priest speaks of the Holy Countenance that is once more averted in unbearable pain. He speaks of everything holy being spat upon, slapped, and of sacrileges committed by ignorant men, 'who know not what they do'. The words of the sermon are mournful, vague, and portentious. 'Flock to the Church, our last stronghold! The Church will not betray you!'"

Babel also interviewed an old woman who was attending the same Liturgy, who told him, "How nicely the chorus is chanting. What nice services these are! Last week the Metropolitan himself conducted the services -- never before has there been such holy goodness! The workers from our factory, they, too, come to the services. The people are tired, they're all crumpled up with worry, and in the church there's quiet and there's singing, you can get away from everything."

In a 18 July 1921 letter to Metropolitan bishop Andrey Sheptytsky, Exarch Leonid Feodorov recalled, "From the very beginning, no sooner was I named Exarch of the Russian Catholic Church than I sought every means of entering into relations with the Orthodox clergy. The Metropolitan of Petrograd, Mgr. Benjamin, and several others who enjoyed great influence over the clergy and the people gradually became my good friends. In 1918 (within a year of my appointment) I entered into relations with Patriarch Tikhon himself who cordially received me. At the same period we formed a united front with the Orthodox to defend ourselves against the Bolshevik aggressions. In 1919 we made a joint protest. For the first time in Russian history, the names of Orthodox and Catholic priests were signed to a Christian document drawn up against infernal forces."

The real conflict, however, came out into the open during the Russian famine of 1921 when the Soviet authorities announced the confiscation of Church valuables, allegedly to pay for famine relief. The Russian Orthodox Church agreed to this, but declined to hand over valuables which had actually touched the Eucharist.

Meanwhile, the friendship and alliance between Exarch Leonid Feodorov and Metropolitan Benjamin collapsed after the latter lost his temper and said, "You promise us Union! You want us to meet like brothers in Christ and all this time your Latin priests are causing havoc to our flock behind our back!"

Dmitri Likhachev later recalled, "Services in the remaining Orthodox churches were conducted with especial devoutness. Church choirs sang particularly well as they were swollen by many professional singers (often from the opera company of the Mariinsky Theatre). Priests and other clergy officiated with great feeling."

Metropolitan Benjamin was willing to donate the Church's valuables voluntarily, but would not accept the plundering, desecration, and confiscation by the State of an increasingly number of church buildings by the Bolsheviks. On 6 March Benjamin met with a commission formed to help the starving that agreed to his voluntary dispersal of funds controlled by the parishes. Newspapers praised Benjamin and his clergy for their charitable spirit.

On 5 March 1922, Metropolitan Benjamin, hoping he was not contradicting Patriarch Tikhon or betraying Orthodox teaching about the Real Presence, signed an agreement with Petrograd party officials. He agreed to hand over icon coverings and even chalices that had held the Eucharist, but with the sole condition that the Church itself would be allowed to deconsecrate and melt down these vessels into ingots before both religious and Government eyewitnesses. The Government also agreed to allow parishioners to substitute their own valuables for other church valuables of historic or religious significance. Vladimir Lenin was reportedly enraged when the news reached him.

According to Alexander Solzhenitsyn's The Gulag Archipelago, "The noxious fumes of Christianity were poisoning the revolutionary will. That kind of unity and that way of handing over the valuables were not what the starving people of the Volga needed! The spineless membership of the Petrograd Pomgol was changed. The newspapers began to howl about the 'evil pastors' and 'princes of the Church', and the representatives of the Church were told: 'We don't need your donations! And there won't be any negotiations with you! Everything belongs to the Government - and the Government will take whatever it considers necessary!'"

In response, protesters gathered in Petrograd, shouting and throwing stones at Party officials who were raiding Orthodox churches.

Catholic memoirist E.M. Almedingen later recalled, "In most cases, [confiscation] raids were accompanied by wild outbursts of most abject and vulgar profanation, hardly ever checked by the higher officials who were invariably present at such proceedings."

In an ultimatum of his own, Metropolitan Benjamin now demanded proof that the Soviet State had already exhausted all other sources of revenue, solid proof that the seized Church valuables were going only towards feeding the starving, and signed consent from Patriarch Tikhon before agreeing to further confiscations.

Dmitri Likhachev later recalled, "As persecution of the Church became more widespread, and executions more numerous so all of us felt an even keener grief for the Russia that was dying. Our love for our Motherland resembled least of all prise in her, her victories and conquests. Nowadays many find that hard to understand. We did not sing patriotic songs -- we wept and prayed."

== Arrest ==
The final conflict for Metropolitan Benjamin began when the State-controlled Living Church tried to wrest control away from Patriarch Tikhon and the established hierarchy.

In May 1922, Alexander Vvedensky and Vladimir Krasnitsky travelled to Petrograd seeking to convert Metropolitan Benjamin to the State-controlled Living Church and to thus take over control of the See Petrograd. While secretly confident of the result, Metropolitan Benjamin offered to put the issue before his clergy and laity at the Alexander Nevsky Lavra. First, both sides would speak and then the people would vote.

On Sunday 28 May 1922, after everyone gathered, Vvedensky spoke first, "Brothers and sisters, up to now we have been subject to the Tsar and the Metropolitans. But now we are free, and we ourselves must rule the people and the Church. More than 1,900 years have already passed since it was written for us that the Lord Jesus Christ was born from the Virgin Mary and is the Son of God. But that is not true. We recognize the existence of the God of Sabbaoth, about whom our whole Bible and all the prophets have written... But Jesus Christ is not God. He was simply a very clever man. And it is impossible to call Mary - who was born of a Jewish tribe and herself gave birth to Jesus - the Mother of God and Virgin. And so now we have all recognized the existence of God, that is the God of Sabbaoth, and we must all be united; both Jews and Catholics must be a living people's church."

Fellow senior Living Church clergyman Vladimir Krasnitsky then spoke, denouncing the practice of infant baptism instead of adult baptism. Krasnitsky also praised the Living Church's rejection of the veneration of Saints and their relics, as well as their further break with Orthodox canon law by allowing Bishops to marry and both the divorce and remarriage of priests.

The assembled Orthodox clergy and laity were horrified by these statements by the Living Church clergymen and, after Metropolitan Benjamin with difficulty quieted the outraged audience, he first accused the Living Church of reviving the 4th century heresy of Arianism and then anathematized their clergy and laity alike as both schismatics and heretics. In response, an outraged Vvedensky quietly slipped out a side door and informed a small army of GPU agents waiting outside, who burst into the meeting and, despite the audience's efforts to protect him, arrested Metropolitan Benjamin, who was placed under house arrest pending trial.

Instead of backing down, Metropolitan Benjamin issued a 29 May pastoral letter to every parish and strictly forbade Vvedensky or any other Living Church priests from administering the sacraments within his Diocese until they had first repented before Patriarch Tikhon.

For this reason, an outraged Vvedensky made a point of accompanying the GPU agents who arrested the Metropolitan at his residence. Vvedensky's presence at the Metropolitan's arrest was widely compared with the behavior of Judas Iscariot at the arrest of Jesus Christ.

== Show trial ==
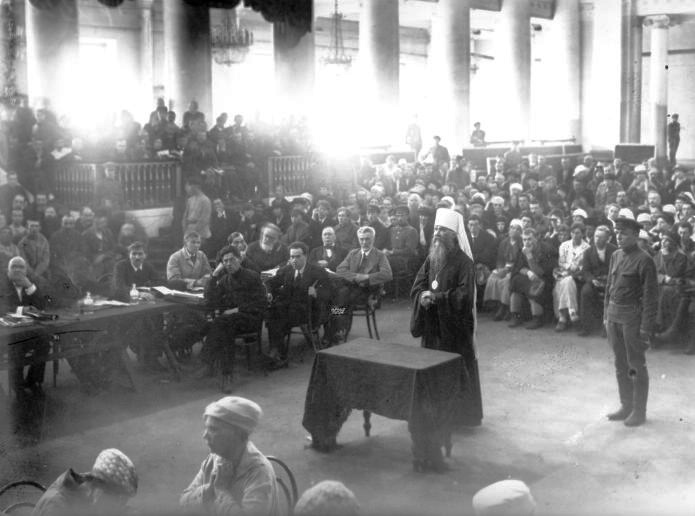
Metropolitan Benjamin addressing the Court at the House of the Unions during his 1922 show trial for anti-Soviet agitation.

He was tried by a drumhead revolutionary tribunal with ten other defendants from 10 June to 5 July. Whenever Benjamin entered the courtroom for his trial, people stood up for him and he blessed them. In addition to anti-Soviet agitation, Metropolitan Benjamin stood accused of, "entering with evil intent into an agreement with... the Soviet Government... and thereby obtaining a relaxation of the decree on the requisitioning of valuables", and obstructing the efforts of the Renovationists to gain control of his Diocese.

According to historian Paul Gabel, "The prosecutor was arch-atheist Peter Krasikov, who, like Krylenko in the Moscow Trial, saw conspiracy rather than genuine religious passion as the cause of the violence surrounding churches. He had orders from Moscow to discredit the Church, and the verdicts were foregone conclusions. At one point in the trial he shouted that the entire Church was a subversive organization and everybody in it should be thrown in prison."

In a subsequent interview in Paris with Constantin de Grunwald, the Metropolitan's Jewish defence attorney, S. Gurovich, recalled, "I felt that I had a genuine Saint sitting behind me on the accused's bench."

According to Paul Gabel, "The defendants, as before, cited the power of Church canons. They also argued that priests had actually attempted to calm the angry crowds that were surrounding and protecting the churches. But when three witnesses came forward to testify for Benjamin they were promptly arrested, thus effectively ending the defense's case. When Benjamin spoke in his own defense, he only offered he had always acted alone and was never an enemy of the people. He had dedicated his whole life to them, and they had repaid him with love."

In his closing arguments, Gurovich warned the Soviet State, "If the Metropolitan perishes for his faith, for his limitless devotion to the believing masses, he will become more dangerous for Soviet power than now... the unfailing historical law warns us that faith grows, strengthens, and increases on the blood of Martyrs."

Before the verdict was announced, Metropolitan Benjamin addressed the court, "Regardless of what my sentence will be, no matter what you decide, life or death, I will lift up my eyes reverently to God, Cross myself and affirm, 'Glory to Thee my Lord; glory to Thee for everything!'"

The defendants were found guilty of being, "dangerous and uncompromising foes of the Republic" and condemned to the supreme penalty of death by shooting. The defendants were given a chance to speak, and Benjamin addressed the court saying it grieved him to be called an enemy of the people whom he had always loved and to whom he had dedicated his life.

Gurovich added, "There are no proofs of guilty. There are no facts. There is not even an indictment... What will history say?"

Meanwhile, the Living Church-controlled Church Administration passed its own sentence, stripping Metropolitan Benjamin, Novitsky, and Kovsharov of their priestly and monastic ranks and reducing them to members of the laity.

== Martyrdom ==
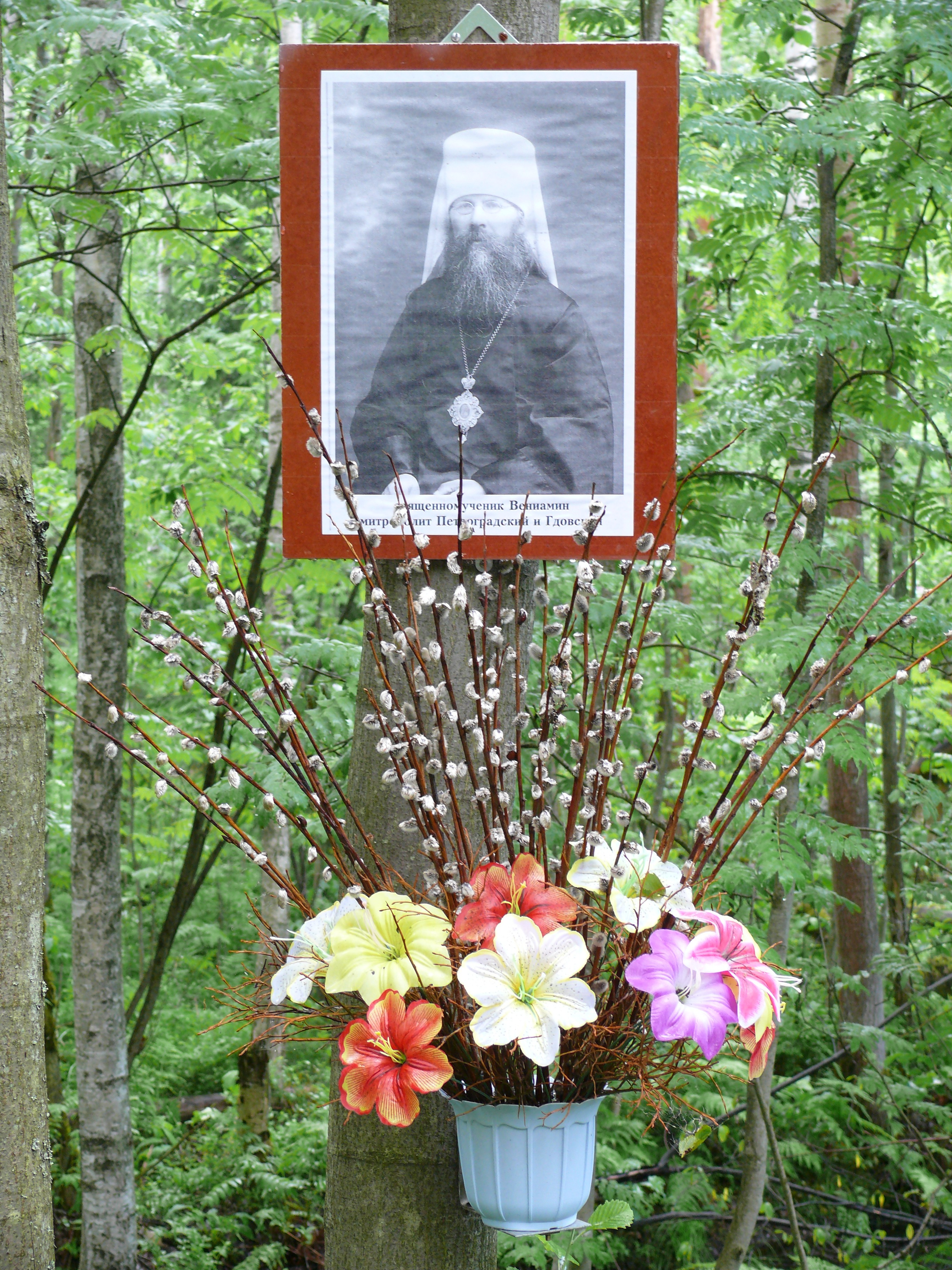
Memorial portrait of St. Benjamin on the road to the place of mass executions in the "artillery range on Irinovka railway"

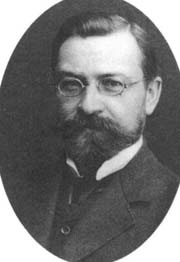
Archimandrite Sergius (As a layman)

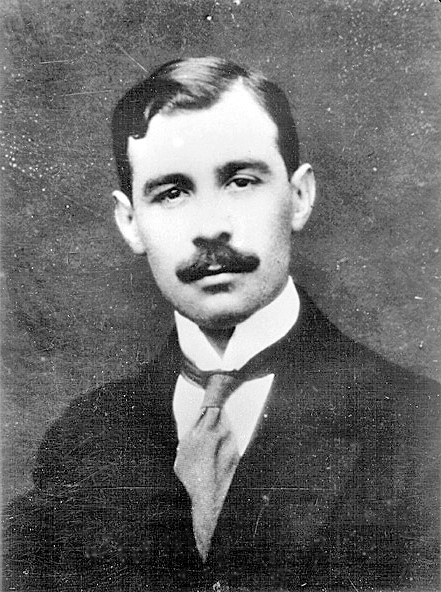
Yury Novitsky

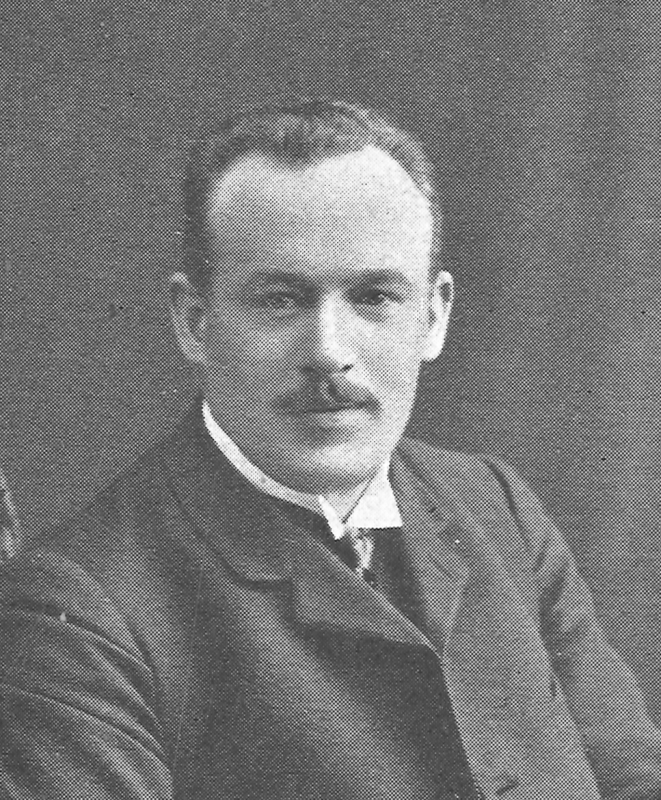
John Kovsharov

The sentences of six of the defendants were later commuted by the Politburo, though not of Metropolitan Benjamin and the others seen as the main leaders of alleged anti-Soviet agitation.

According to Paul Gabel, "A rumor circulated that Benjamin had already been executed. When a crowd gathered around the prison where he was being held, demanding he be shown to them if he were still alive. GPU agents fired into the assemblage and it disbanded. When it formed again, the warden was forced to make a deal: He allowed three members of the gathering to come inside, where they ascertained that Benjamin indeed was still among the living."

During the night of 12–13 August [O.S. 30–31 July] 1922 after having been shaved and dressed in rags so that the firing squad would not know that they were shooting members of the Orthodox clergy, Benjamin and those with him, Archimandrite Sergius, Yury Novitsky, and John Kovsharov, were executed in the eastern outskirts of Petrograd, at the Porokhov Station of the Irinovskaya Railroad (a narrow-gauge railroad built to bring peat into the city for heating that starts in the Bolshaya Okhta district of St. Petersburg, across the Neva River from the Smolny Institute and ending at Vsevolozhsk 24 kilometres (15 mi) east of the city.)

Despite the continuing theological differences and the recent rift between them, both Exarch Leonid Feodorov and his superiors in the Vatican were devastated by the news of Metropolitan Benjamin's execution.

Furthermore, Irish Catholic New York Herald correspondent Captain Francis McCullagh attempted to make the whole world aware of the trial and execution of Metropolitan Benjamin, but his every attempt, "was suppressed by the censor". Although McCullagh was more successful in raising global awareness of the 1923 Moscow show trial of Archbishop Jan Cieplak, Monsignor Konstanty Budkiewicz, and Exarch Leonid Feodorov, the Captain later recalled, "Bishop Benjamin was a martyr quite as much as Mgr. Budkiewicz was. And as I have shown, he was not the only martyr of the Orthodox Church who suffered on this occasion."

== Legacy ==
Although the anti-communist and White émigré hierarchy of Russian Orthodox Church Outside Russia (ROCOR) canonized the Russian Orthodox martyrs of the Red Terror decades before the collapse of the Soviet Union, the surviving hierarchy of the Moscow Patriarchate was taken over in 1926 by former Renovationist, Soviet secret police informant, and agent of influence, Metropolitan (later Patriarch) Sergei (Stragorodsky). In what other Orthodox jurisdictions have repeatedly condemned as the "heresy of Sergianism", the Moscow Patriarchate hierarchy embraced an official policy that the Soviet State was just and correct in all its actions up to and including the show trials and mass executions of Orthodox clergy and laity. Nevertheless, covert veneration of Metropolitan Benjamin and other Russian Orthodox Martyrs at the hands of the Soviet State continued within the Moscow Patriarchate anyway.

On 1 October 1990, the Supreme Soviet of the Soviet Union passed a decree formally repudiating seven decades of traditional Marxist-Leninist anti-religious policy and granting religious freedom, the equality of all religious denominations before the law, and the right to arrange the religious education of children to all Soviet citizens without exception. In 1992 the Moscow Patriarchate formally Canonized Metropolitan Benjamin as a Saint and a Martyr.

Benjamin's cenotaph is located in the Nikolskoe Cemetery of the Alexander Nevsky Lavra; the Decree of Canonization directs for Benjamin and others "That their precious remains, should they have been found, shall be considered holy relics."

== Quotes ==
- "It is difficult, hard to suffer, but according to the measure of my sufferings, consolation abounds from God... [When one gives oneself over wholly to the will of God] man abounds in consolation and does not even feel the greatest sufferings; filled as he is in the midst of sufferings by an inner peace, he draws others to sufferings so that they should imitate that condition in which the happy sufferer finds himself."

== See also ==
- New Martyr
- Hieromartyr
- Vladimir Lossky
