= Butkevich =

Butkevich or Butkevych (Буткевич) is an East Slavic surname. Notable people with the surname include:

- Aleh Butkevich (born 1972), Belarusian Catholic clergyman
- Anna Butkevich (born 1985), Ukrainian TV and radio presenter, model, and actress
- Georgy Butkevich (1903–1974), Soviet and Russian power engineer
- Leonid Butkevich (1918–1985), Soviet sniper
- Maksym Butkevych (born 1977), Ukrainian human rights activist, journalist and serviceman
- Mikhail Butkevich (1926–1995), Soviet theatre director and professor of drama
- Olga Butkevych (born 1986), Ukrainian-British wrestler
- Paul Butkevich (Pauls Butkēvičs, born 1940), Latvian actor
- Volodymyr Butkevych (born 1946), Ukrainian scholar and human rights lawyer

== See also ==
- Butkevičius
- Butkiewicz
