= Butkevičius =

- Lithuanian surname
- m.: Butkevičius
- f.: (unmarried): Butkevičiūtė
- f.: (married): Butkevičienė
- Related names: Lithuanian: Budkievičius; East Slavic: Butkevich, Budkevich; Polish: Butkiewicz, Budkiewicz, Latvian: Budkēvičs, Butkēvičs

Butkevičius is a Lithuanian surname. It may refer to:

- Algirdas Butkevičius (born 1958), Lithuanian politician
  - Butkevičius Cabinet
- Arnas Butkevičius (born 1992), Lithuanian basketball player
- Audrius Butkevičius (born 1960), Lithuanian politician
- Povilas Butkevičius (born 1987), Lithuanian basketball player

== See also ==
- Butkus
