= Butkiewicz =

Butkiewicz is a Polish-language surname. A variant of Budkiewicz, it is derived from the given name Budka. The surname is most frequent in north-eastern Poland. It is related to surnames in several other languages.

Language	Masculine	Feminine
Polish	Butkiewicz [butˈkjɛvit͡ʂ])	
Belarusian (Romanization)	Буткевіч (Butkievič, Butkievich)	
Latvian	Butkevičs, Butkēvičs	Butkeviča, Butkēviča
Lithuanian	Butkevičius	Butkevičienė (married); Butkevičiūtė (unmarried)
Russian (Romanization)	Буткевич (Butkevich, Butkevitch)	
Ukrainian (Romanization)	Буткевич (Butkevych, Butkevytch, Butkevyč)	

== People ==
- Andrzej Butkiewicz (1955–2008), Polish political activist
- John Butkiewicz, Australian field lacrosse player
- Leslie Butkiewicz (born 1982), Belgian tennis player
- Michał Butkiewicz (born 1942), Polish fencer

== See also ==
- Butkevich
