= Nunciature of Eugenio Pacelli =

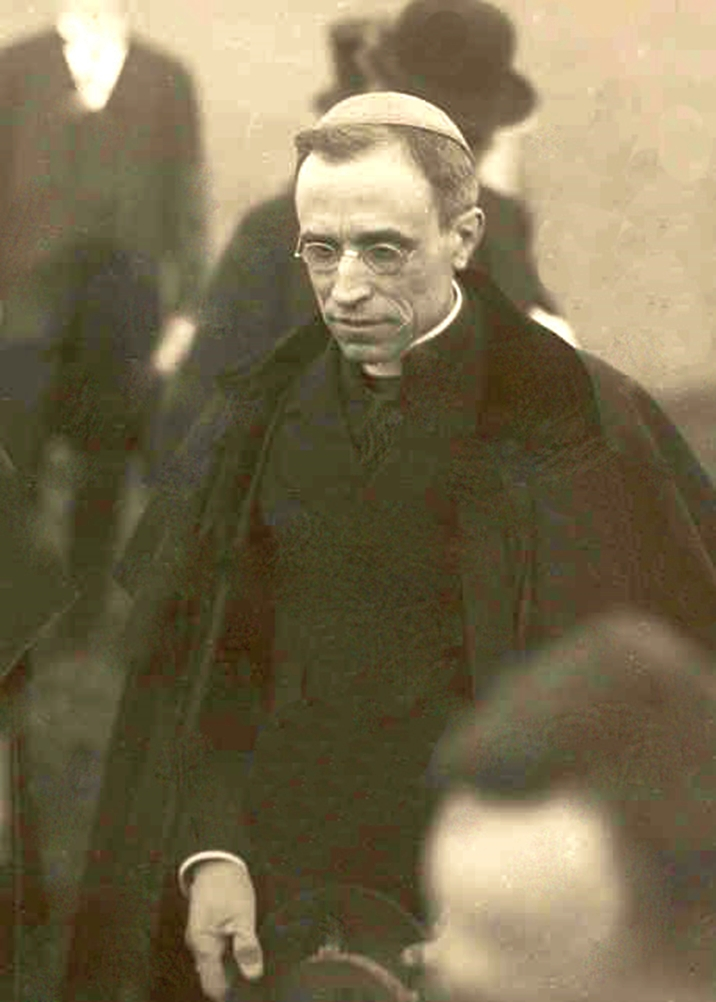
Pacelli as nuncio visiting a group of bishops in Bavaria.

Eugenio Pacelli (future Pope Pius XII) was a nuncio in Munich to Bavaria from 23 April 1917 to 23 June 1920. As there was no nuncio to Prussia or Germany at the time, Pacelli was, for all practical purposes, the nuncio to all of the German Empire.

Pacelli was appointed nuncio to Germany on 23 June 1920, and his nunciature was moved to Berlin after the completion of a concordat with Bavaria in 1925. Many of Pacelli's Munich staff would stay with him for the rest of his life, including his advisor Robert Leiber and Sister Pascalina Lehnert – housekeeper, friend and adviser to Pacelli for 41 years.

== Nuncio to Bavaria (1917–1920) ==
=== Appointment ===
Pope Benedict XV appointed Eugenio Pacelli as nuncio to Bavaria on 23 April 1917, consecrating him as titular Bishop of Sardis and immediately elevating him to archbishop in the Sistine Chapel on 13 May 1917. After his consecration, Pacelli left for Bavaria.

=== Vatican peace initiative ===
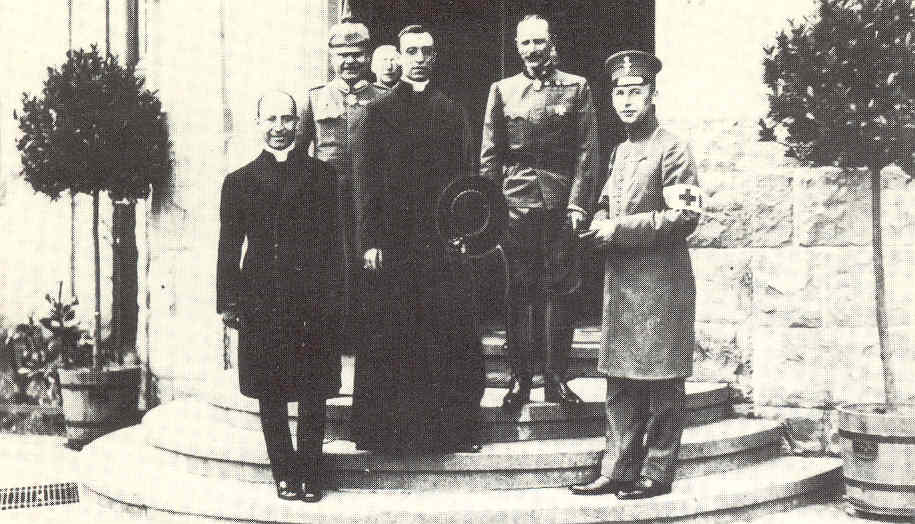
Eugenio Pacelli at the Imperial Headquarters with the peace proposal of Benedict XV to German Emperor]Wilhelm II.

Once in Munich, he conveyed the papal initiative to end the war to German authorities. He met with King Ludwig III on 29 May and later with Wilhelm II and Chancellor Bethmann-Hollweg, who replied positively to the papal initiative. Pacelli saw “for the first time a real prospect for peace”. However, Bethmann-Hollweg was forced to resign, and the German High Command, hoping for a military victory, delayed the German reply until 20 September. Pacelli was “extraordinarily disappointed and depressed” since the German note did not include the concessions promised earlier. For the remainder of the war, he concentrated on Benedict’s humanitarian efforts.

After the war, during the short-lived Bavarian Soviet Republic in 1919, Pacelli was one of the few foreign diplomats to remain in Munich. According to Pascalina Lehnert, who was personally there at the time, Pacelli calmly faced down a small group of Spartacist revolutionaries, who had entered the nunciature by force in order to take his car. Pacelli told them to leave the extraterritorial building, to which they responded "only with your car". Pacelli, who had ordered to disconnect the starter, permitted the car to be towed away after he was informed that the Bavarian government had promised to return the vehicle at once. Several versions of the incident and alleged later incidents are much more colourful, but, according to the relator in the beatification process in the Vatican, "mostly based on imagination". The popular view may also overlook his cordial relations with socialist politicians like Friedrich Ebert and Philipp Scheidemann and his prolonged secret negotiations with the Soviet Union (see below). “Pacelli is simply too intelligent to be irritated by something like this”, opined the Bavarian representative at the Vatican.

On the night of Adolf Hitler's Beer Hall Putsch, Franz Matt, the only member of the Bavarian cabinet not present at the Bürgerbräu Keller, was having dinner with Pacelli and Cardinal Michael von Faulhaber. The American diplomat Robert Murphy, then in Munich, wrote that "all the foreign representatives at Munich, including Nuncio Pacelli, were convinced that Hitler's political career had ended ignominiously in 1924. When I ventured to remind His Holiness of this bit of history (in 1945), he laughed and said: 'I know what you mean – papal infallibility. Don't forget, I was only a monsignor then'."

== Nuncio in Berlin (1920–1929) ==
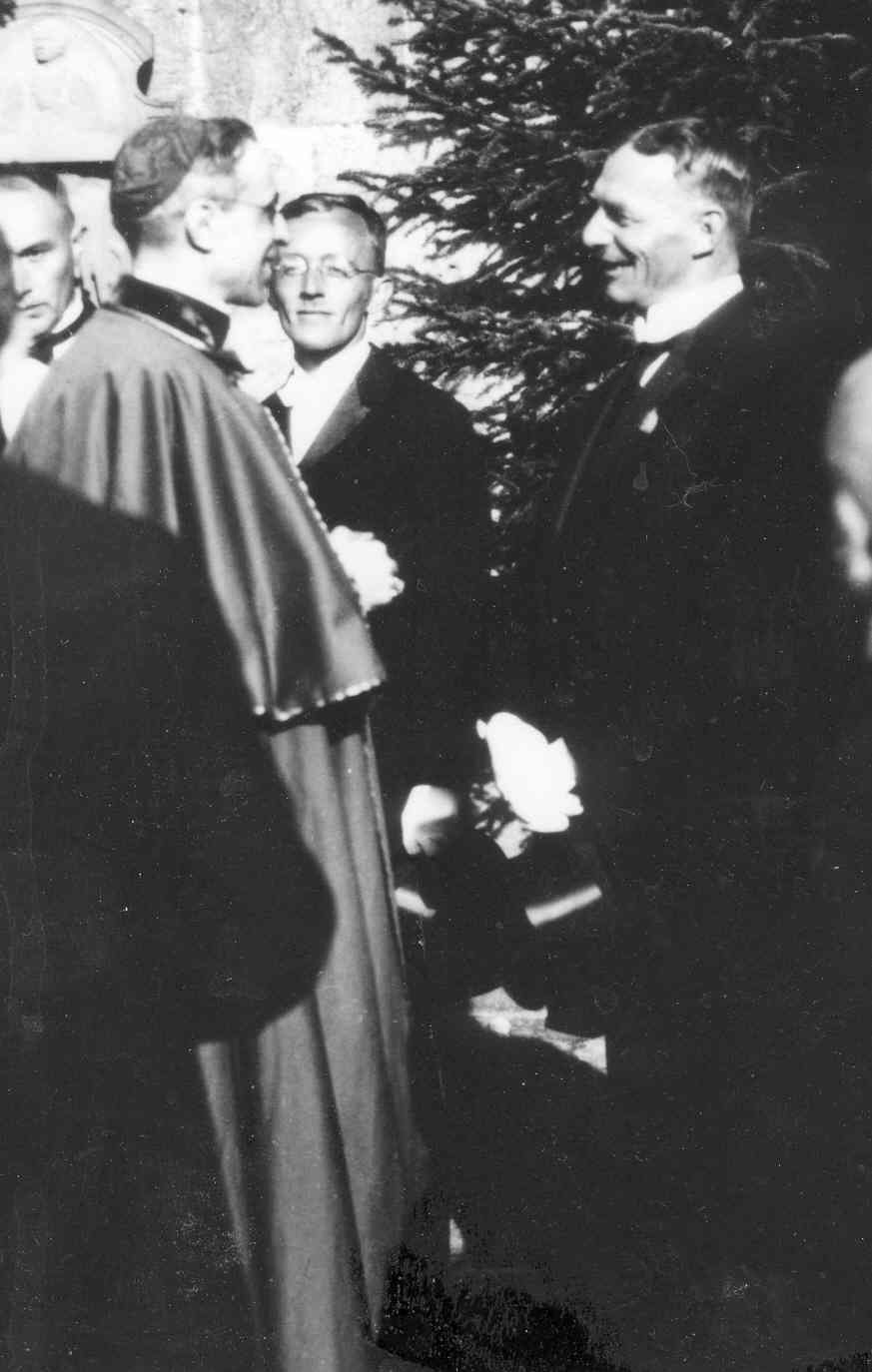
Pacelli meeting with local authorities in 1922. Pacelli's public popularity surpassed that of any German cardinal or bishop by 1929.

Several years after he had been appointed nuncio to Germany on 23 June 1920, he completed a concordat with Bavaria and later resigned as nuncio to Bavaria and was appointed first nuncio to Prussia, which kept in personal union the office of nuncio to Germany. A nunciature was opened in Berlin, where Pacelli moved in 1925. Many of Pacelli's staff in Munich would stay with him for the rest of his life, including his advisor Robert Leiber and Sister Pascalina Lehner, a housekeeper, friend and adviser to Pacelli for 41 years.

In Berlin, Pacelli was doyen or Dean of the Diplomatic Corps and active in diplomatic and many social activities. There, he met notables like Albert Einstein, Adolf von Harnack, Gustav Stresemann, Clemens August Graf von Galen and Konrad Graf von Preysing, the last two of whom he elevated to cardinal in 1946. He worked with the German priest Ludwig Kaas, who was known for his expertise in relations between church and state and was politically active in the Centre Party. While in Germany, he enjoyed working as a pastor. He travelled to all regions, attended Katholikentag (national gatherings of the faithful) and delivered some 50 sermons and speeches to the German people.

=== Negotiations with the Soviet Union (1925–1927) ===
In postwar Germany, Pacelli worked mainly on clarifying the relations between church and state, but in the absence of a papal nuncio in Moscow, Pacelli worked also on diplomatic arrangements between the Vatican and the Soviet Union. He negotiated food shipments for Russia, where the Church was persecuted. He met with Soviet representatives including Foreign Minister Georgi Chicherin, who rejected any kind of religious education and the ordination of priests and bishops but offered agreements without the points vital to the Vatican. “An enormously sophisticated conversation between two highly intelligent men like Pacelli and Chicherin, who seemed not to dislike each other”, wrote one participant. Despite Vatican pessimism and a lack of visible progress, Pacelli continued the secret negotiations until Pope Pius XI ordered them to be discontinued in 1927.

=== Weimar Republic ===
Pacelli supported the Weimar Coalition with the Social Democrats and liberal parties. Although he had cordial relations with representatives of the Centre Party such as Marx and Kaas, he did not involve it in his dealings with the German government.

Pacelli supported German diplomatic activity aimed at rejection of punitive measures from victorious former enemies. He blocked French attempts for an ecclesiastical separation of the Saar region, supported the appointment of a papal administrator for Danzig and aided the reintegration of priests expelled from Poland.

Pacelli was critical of German policy regarding financial reparations, which he considered unimaginative and lacking a sense of reality. He regretted the return of William, German Crown Prince, from exile as destabilising. After repeated German acts of sabotage against the French occupation forces in the Ruhr valley in 1923, German media reported a conflict between Pacelli and the German authorities. The Vatican denounced the acts against the French in the Ruhr.

When he returned to Rome in 1929, praise was heaped by Catholics and Protestants alike on Pacelli, who by now had become more popular than any other German cardinal or bishop, whom he had largely excluded from his negotiations and dealings with the German government.

== Legacy ==
It is commonly argued that Pacelli modeled his own wartime papacy on his observations of the actions of Benedict XV during World War I because of his personal involvement with the peace entreats to the Triple Alliance countries, from which private donations were essential to keeping the Vatican solvent during this period, although there were no similar negotiations with France or Britain.
