= Francis McCullagh =

Irish journalist and war correspondent

Francis McCullagh (30 April 1874 – 25 November 1956) was an Irish journalist, war correspondent, and author.

== Career ==
McCullagh was born in Bridge Street, Omagh, County Tyrone, in 1874, the son of James McCullagh, a publican originally from the Gortin area, and Bridget McCullagh.

He began his journalism career as a staff reporter at the Glasgow Observer (later Scottish Catholic Observer), and would continue writing for the newspaper through 1906–1937. From 1898, he was a correspondent for the New York Herald. In 1903, he was living in Japan, working for the English-language newspaper The Japan Times. Observing the growing tension between the Empire of Japan and the Russian Empire, he studied the Russian language. In 1904, he moved to Port Arthur, the major Russian military base in Manchuria, obtaining a post as a correspondent for the Novi Kraï (New Land) newspaper of Port Arthur. At the start of the Russo-Japanese War, he became a non-military observer embedded within the Imperial Russian Army. In March 1905, he was evacuated as a prisoner of war, traveling from Dalny to Ujina on the Nippon Yusen liner Awa Maru. His experiences were published in 1906 as With the Cossacks: Being the Story of an Irishman Who Rode With the Cossacks Throughout the Russo-Japanese War.

He subsequently returned to Russia to cover the 1918-1922 Siberian Intervention to assist the anti-communist White Army of Admiral Alexander Kolchak during the Russian Civil War. At one point, the Bolshevik Red Army captured him. While a prisoner, he managed to interview Patriarch Tikhon of Moscow. His book about the experience, A Prisoner of the Reds, was first published in 1921.

During the Soviet anti-religious persecution taking place under the cover of the Russian famine of 1921, McCullagh served as a correspondent for the New York Herald. Along with those of Fr. Edmund A. Walsh, McCullagh's detailed reports about the 1923 Moscow show trial prosecution by Nikolai Krylenko of Archbishop Jan Cieplak, Exarch Leonid Feodorov, Monsignor Konstanty Budkiewicz, and other Catholic clergy and laity reached a worldwide audience, much to the shock of the Soviet State. McCullagh's detailed account of his visit and of the Cieplak show trial were published in the 1924 volume The Bolshevik Persecution of Christianity, which was immediately translated into French, German and Spanish.

On 10 April 1923, People's Commissar for Foreign Affairs Georgy Chicherin wrote a letter to fellow Politburo member Joseph Stalin, which described the political fallout from Fr. Walsh and Captain McCullagh's successful efforts to globally publicize both the Cieplak show trial and the execution of Monsignor Konstanty Budkiewicz on Easter Sunday, 1923. In America, France, and the United Kingdom, efforts to gain diplomatic recognition for the USSR had suffered a major setback. In Westminster, Labour MPs had been flooded by petitions "demanding the defense of Cieplak and Budkiewicz", by "worker's organizations", "dying socialists", and "professionalists". In the United States, Republican Senator William Borah had been about to discuss possible recognition of the USSR with U.S. Secretary of State Charles Evans Hughes. Due to both the trial and Monsignor Budkiewicz's subsequent execution, the meeting had been cancelled and the senator had been forced to indefinitely postpone the founding of a committee to press for diplomatic negotiations. Chicherin explained that the outside world saw the continuing anti-religious campaign "as nothing other than naked religious persecution." Chicherin expressed fear that, if Russian Orthodox Patriarch Tikhon were similarly tried and sentenced to death, the news would, "worsen much further our international position in all our relations." He concluded by proposing "the rejection in advance of the death sentence on Tikhon".

Soviet Foreign Commissar Georgy Chicherin very likely once again had both Fr. Walsh and Captain McCullagh in mind when he confided years later in Bishop Michel d'Herbigny, "We Communists feel sure we can triumph over London Capitalism. But Rome will prove a harder nut to crack... Without Rome, religion would die. But Rome sends out, for the service of her religion, propagandists of every nationality. They are more effective than guns. It is certain it will be a long struggle."

In 1927, Father Wilfrid Parsons arranged payment from the Knights of Columbus to "smuggle" McCullagh into Mexico to cover the Cristero War for an American audience.

In 1937, he covered the Spanish Civil War.

McCullagh died in White Plains, New York in 1956.

== Works ==
- (1906). With the Cossacks; Being the Story of an Irishman who Rode with the Cossacks Throughout the Russo-Japanese War. London: Eveleigh Nash. OCLC 777525 [Reprinted by Naval and Military Press, 2009].
- (1910). The Fall of Abdul-Hamid, Methuen & Co., Ltd.
- (1912). Italy's War for a Desert, Being Some Experiences of a War-Correspondent with the Italians in Tripoli. London, Herbert and Daniel.
- (1921). A Prisoner of the Reds, the Story of a British Officer Captured in Siberia. London. John Murray.
- (1924). The Bolshevik Persecution of Christianity. New York, E. P. Dutton [1st Pub. London, John Murray, 1924].
- (1928). Red Mexico; A Reign of Terror in America. New York, L. Carrier & Co.
- (1937). In Franco's Spain: Being the Experiences of an Irish War Correspondent During the Great Civil War. London, Burns, Oates & Washbourne, Ltd.

=== Selected articles ===
- "A Trappist Monastery in Japan," The Catholic World, Vol. LXXIX, April/September 1904.
- "Civil War Inevitable in the Empire of the Czar," The New York Times, 8 July 1906.
- "When Turkey's Sultan Faced his Masters," The New York Times, 10 January 1909.
- "On the March with the Macedonians," The New York Times, 9 May 1909.
- "How the Young Turks Fought and Captured Constantinople," The New York Times, 16 May 1909.
- "How the Attack was Delayed," The New York Times, 16 May 1909.
- "The Fall of Constantinople," The New York Times, 23 May 1909.
- "The Taking of Constantinople," The New York Times, 23 May 1909.
- "How Abdul Hamid Was Sent Into His Exile," The New York Times, 30 May 1909.
- "Napoleonic Rapidity," The New York Times, 30 May 1909.
- "What was Found in the Lair of Abdul Hamid," The New York Times, 6 June 1909.
- "The April Mutiny in Stamboul," The Dublin Review, Vol. CXLIV, July/October 1909.
- "Some Causes of the Portuguese Revolution," The Nineteenth Century and After, Vol. LXVIII, No. 405, 1910.
- "Modernism in Islam," The Dublin Review, Vol. CXLVI, January/April 1910.
- "The Portuguese Revolution," The Dublin Review, Vol. CXLVIII, January/April 1911.
- "Portuguese Republicans 'Fiddling While Rome Burns'," The New York Times, 21 May 1911.
- "Separation of Church and State in Portugal," The Catholic World, Vol. XCIII, April/September 1911.
- "'Freedom' in Portugal," The Living Age, Vol. CCLXVIII, 1911.
- "The Portuguese Separation Law," The Dublin Review, Vol. CXLIX, July/October 1911.
- "How the Carbonaria Saved the Portuguese Republic", The Contemporary Review, No. 561, September 1912.
- "The Belgian Strike," The Dublin Review, Vol. CLIII, July/October 1913.
- "Portugal: The Nightmare Republic," The Nineteenth Century and After, January 1914.
- "The Portuguese Republic and the Press," The Dublin Review, Vol. CLIV, January/April 1914.
- "The Baltic States from an Irish Point of View. I: The Baltic Barons," Studies: An Irish Quarterly Review, Vol. 11, No. 41, Mar. 1922.
- "The United States and Mexico," The Living Age, 15 November 1927.
- "Who Is Calles?," Studies: An Irish Quarterly Review, Vol. 17, No. 65, Mar. 1928.
- "Notes on Linguistic Studies in Paris," Studies: An Irish Quarterly Review, Vol. 18, No. 69, Mar. 1929.
- "Mexico and the Press," Studies: An Irish Quarterly Review, Vol. 18, No. 70, Jun. 1929.
- "A Pioneer of Newspaper Combines," Studies: An Irish Quarterly Review, Vol. 19, No. 73, Mar. 1930.
- "Peter the Great and Lenin," Studies: An Irish Quarterly Review, Vol. 19, No. 76, Dec. 1930.
- "The General Who Shall Take Madrid," Catholic Herald, 5 March 1937.
- "America is Becoming More and More Anti-Democratic," Catholic Herald, 6 December 1940.
