= Scottish Catholic Observer =

Newspaper

- Type: Newspaper
- Owner: The Catholic Herald
- Editor: Peter Diamond
- Founded: 1885
- Ceased publication: 2020
- Headquarters: 19 Waterloo Street, Glasgow, G2 6BT
- Price: £1
- Website: www.sconews.co.uk

The Scottish Catholic Observer was Scotland's only national Catholic newspaper, founded in 1885. It ceased publication in 2020. It featured news of the Roman Catholic Church in Scotland as well as regular international church news and reports from the Vatican. For most of the twenty-first century, it was owned by The Catholic Herald newspaper group.

Weekly editions contained local, national, and international news, opinion pages, letters, education news and reviews, in addition to regular reader competitions. The paper also listed births, deaths, and marriages across Scotland. Much of its exclusive news was later picked up by the mainstream media.

The paper carried regular features on Scottish Catholic life and history, weekly columnists alongside an Ecumenical coverage which keeps readers up to date with Scottish Inter-Church dialogue and projects.

The Scottish Catholic Observer was redesigned and relaunched in 2008 with editor Liz Leydon, a former Scotsman journalist, and manager Rebecca Rigg. In June 2016, deputy editor Ian Dunn took over as editor, who was succeeded by his deputy Daniel Harkins in 2018.

Notable former reporters include SNP MP Brendan O'Hara, war correspondent Francis McCullagh, and Kevin McKenna, columnist for The Observer and former deputy editor of The Herald and executive editor of the Daily Mail in Scotland.

== History ==
The Scottish Catholic Observer was created in 1885 as the Glasgow Observer. Its first edition was published on 18 April 1885 by the Glasgow Publishing Company at 58 Renfield Street, Glasgow. It was shortly afterwards bought by Irishman Charles Diamond, who would use it and the Preston-based Catholic News as the basis of The Catholic Herald.

The newspaper's early years were overseen by the Glasgow-born managing editor David John Mitchell Quin, who was recruited by Charles Diamond from the English-based Catholic Times.

In the twenty first century it was owned by The Catholic Herald newspaper group, but in March 2016 the newspaper was put up for sale by its owners for a reported fee of £350,000.

In March 2020, the paper ceased publication at the time of the first national COVID-19 lockdown, which also saw churches closed. The company was wound up in December of that year.

== Editors ==
Peter Diamond (2019-2020)
Daniel Harkins (2018–2019)
Ian Dunn (2016–2018)
Liz Leydon (2008–2016)
Harry Conroy (2000–2007)
Eddie Barnes (1999–2000)
Hugh Farmer (1993–1999)
John MacLean (1990–1993)
Jim Coffey (1977–1990)
Rennie McOwan (1962–1964)
