= Georgy Chicherin =

Soviet revolutionary, politician, and diplomat (1872–1936)

- Георгий Чичерин
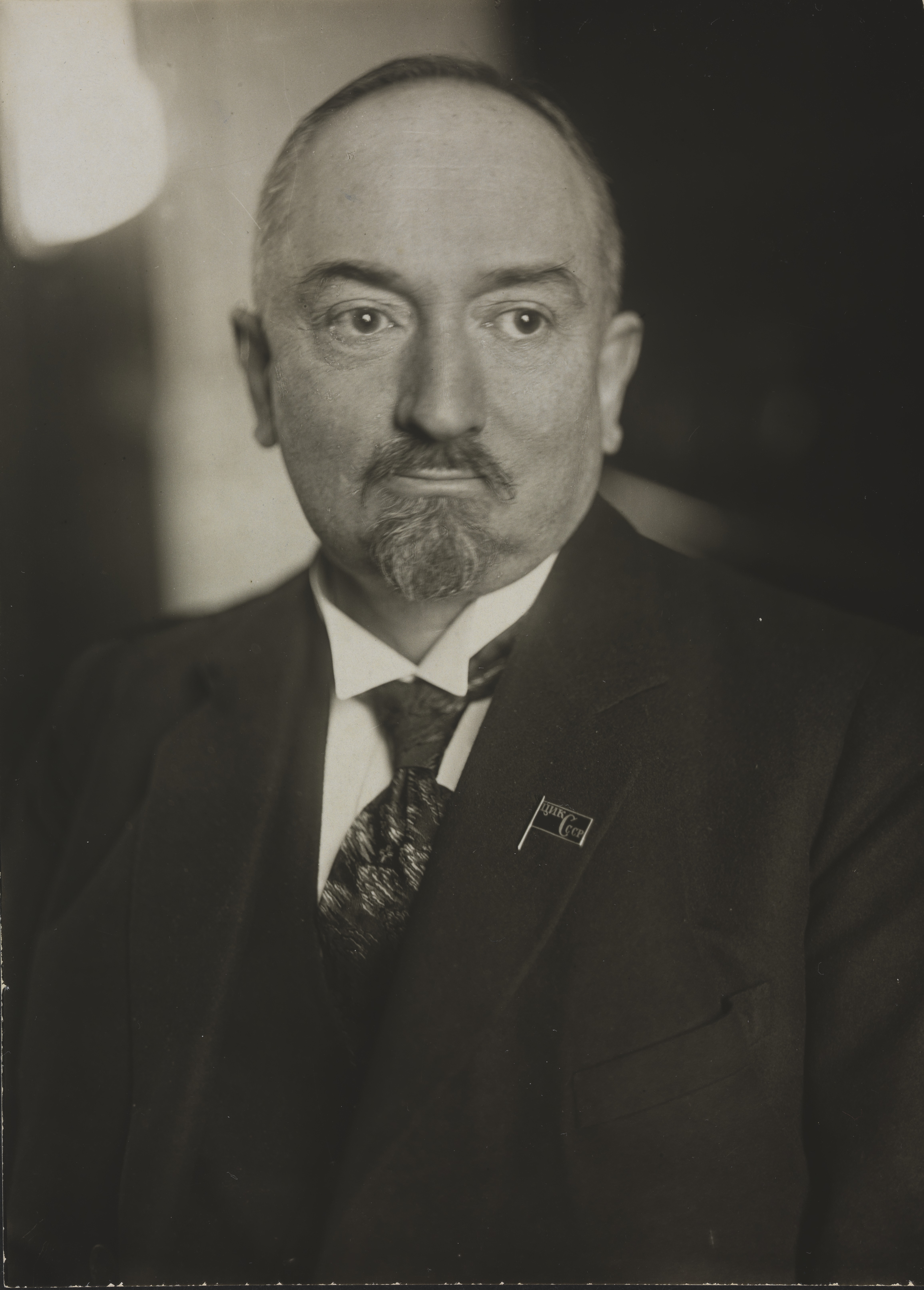
- Chicherin c. 1925–30

People's Commissar for Foreign Affairs of the Soviet Union
- In office 6 July 1923 – 21 July 1930
- Premier: Vladimir Lenin; Alexey Rykov
- Preceded by: Position established
- Succeeded by: Maxim Litvinov

People's Commissar for Foreign Affairs of the Russian SFSR
- In office 9 April 1918 – 6 July 1923
- Premier: Vladimir Lenin
- Preceded by: Leon Trotsky
- Succeeded by: Position abolished

Personal details
- Born: 12 November 1872 Chicherin Estate, Karaul, Kirsanovsky Uyezd, Tambov, Russian Empire (Note: Georgy was born on the estate of his uncle, Boris Chicherin, in Karaul, Tambov.)
- Died: 7 July 1936 (aged 63) Moscow, Russian SFSR, Soviet Union
- Party: RSDLP (Mensheviks) (1905–1918); All-Union Communist Party (Bolsheviks) (1918–1936)
- Profession: Statesman, diplomat

Georgy Vasilyevich Chicherin (or Tchitcherin; Russian: Гео́ргий Васи́льевич Чиче́рин; 24 November 1872 – 7 July 1936) was a Russian Marxist revolutionary and a Soviet politician who served as the first People's Commissar for Foreign Affairs in the Soviet government from March 1918 to July 1930.

== Childhood and early career ==
A distant relative of Alexander Pushkin, Georgy Chicherin was born into an old noble family. He was born on the estate of his uncle, Boris Chicherin, in Karaul, Tambov. His father, Vasily N. Chicherin, was a diplomat employed by the Foreign Office of the Russian Empire.

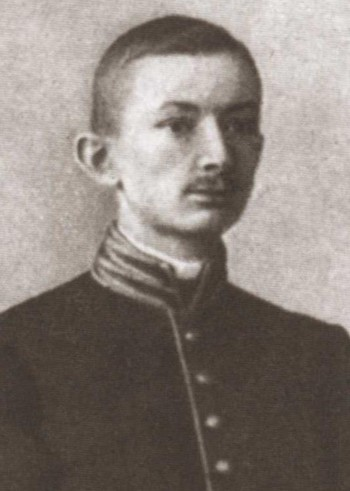
Chicherin in January 1900

His uncle was an influential legal philosopher and historian. As a young man, Chicherin became fascinated with history; classical music, especially Richard Wagner; and Friedrich Nietzsche, passions that he would pursue throughout his life. He wrote a book about Wolfgang Amadeus Mozart and spoke all major European languages and a number of Asian ones. After graduating from St. Petersburg University with a degree in history and languages, Chicherin worked in the archival section of the Russian Ministry for Foreign Affairs from 1897 to 1903.

In 1904, Chicherin inherited the estate of his famous uncle in Tambov Governorate and became very wealthy. He immediately used his new fortune to support revolutionary activities in the runup to the Russian Revolution of 1905 and was forced to flee abroad to avoid arrest late in that year. He spent the next 13 years in London, Paris and Berlin, where he joined the Menshevik faction of the Russian Social Democratic Labor Party and was active in emigre politics. In Imperial Germany, Chicherin allegedly sought medical treatment in a nursing home to cure his homosexuality.

== Antiwar activity in Britain ==
With the outbreak of the First World War in 1914, Chicherin adopted an antiwar position, which brought him closer to Vladimir Lenin's Bolsheviks. In 1915 he moved to Britain, where he soon developed a friendship with Mary Bridges-Adams, an activist with the Plebs League and founding member of the Central Labour College. Both founded the Russian Political Prisoners and Exiles Relief Committee, an organisation that continued a long tradition in British society to support the victims of tsarist repression, but it realigned its focus to build support from organised labour, rather than searching for wealthy patrons. The aim of the committee was to collect money to send to revolutionaries incarcerated in tsarist prisons, but under Chicherin's skilful watch, the aim was extended to cover the broader political aim of systematic agitation against tsarism itself.

In 1917, he was arrested by the British government for his antiwar writings, and he spent a few months in Brixton Prison.

== Bolshevik government ==
The Bolsheviks had come to power in Russia after the October Revolution of 1917. The first head of the Commissariat of Foreign Affairs, which had replaced the Ministry of Foreign Affairs, Leon Trotsky, secured Chicherin's release and safe passage to Russia in exchange for British subjects who were being held in Russia, including George Buchanan, the British ambassador. Chicherin had now started to be in poor health and overweight.

Upon his return to Russia in early 1918, Chicherin formally joined the Bolsheviks, and was appointed as Trotsky's deputy during the negotiations that led to the Treaty of Brest-Litovsk. After the treaty was signed in late February 1918, Trotsky, who had advocated a different policy, resigned his position in early March. Chicherin became the acting head of the Commissariat and was appointed Commissar for Foreign Affairs on 30 May. On 2 March 1919, he was one of five men chairing the First Congress of the Comintern.

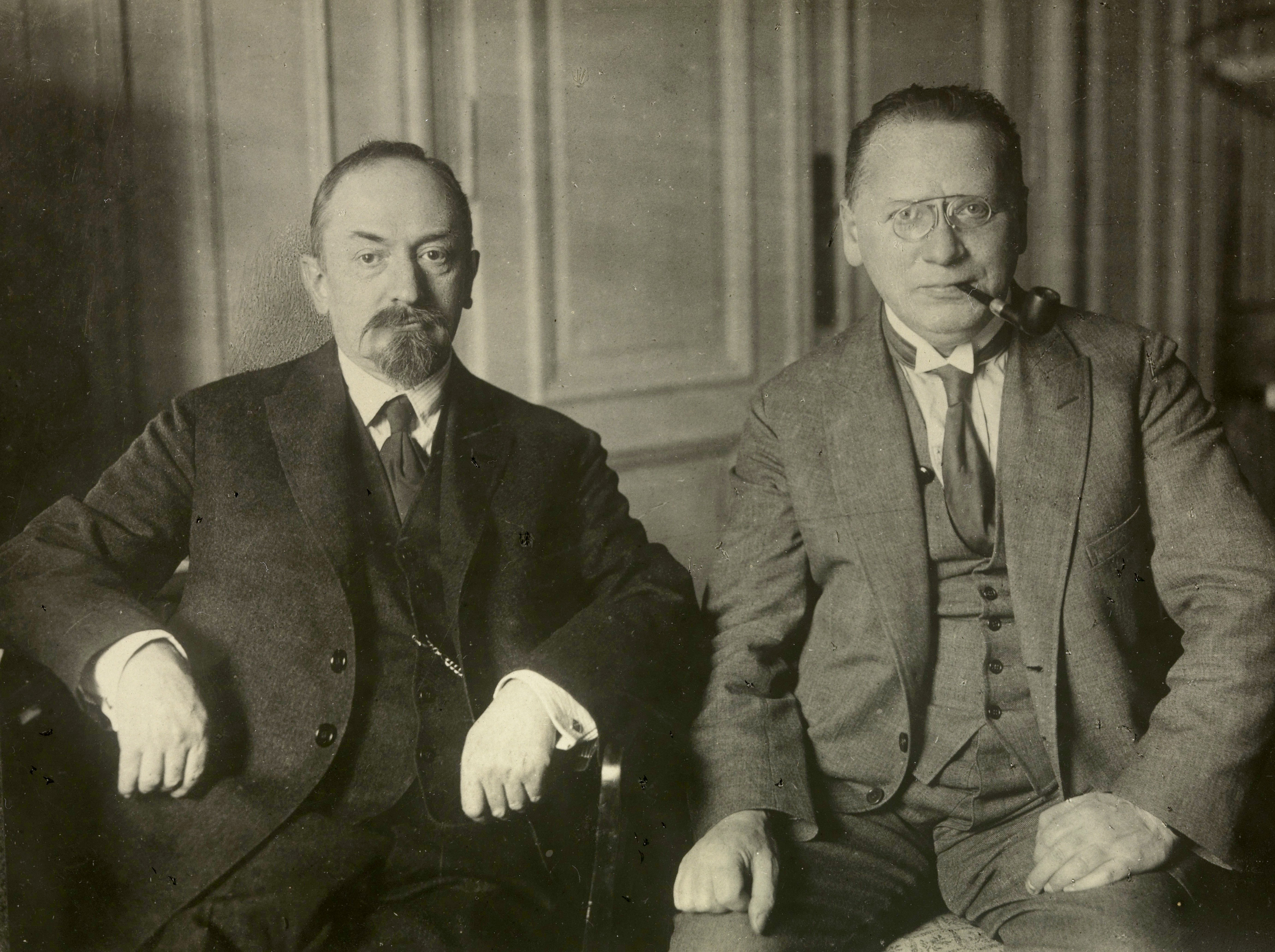
Chicherin with deputy People's Commissar of Foreign Affairs Maxim Litvinov

Chicherin followed a pro-German foreign policy in line with his anti-British attitudes, which he had developed during his time in the Foreign Ministry, when Britain was blocking Russian expansion in Asia. In 1920, he even suggested to Lenin, who agreed, that English workers should be formed into volunteer units. Soviet armies were nearing Warsaw, but nothing came of the idea.

In July 1918, his close friend, Ulrich von Brockdorff-Rantzau, became the new German ambassador after his predecessor, Count Wilhelm Mirbach, was shot in the Left SR uprising.

In 1922, Chicherin participated in the Genoa Conference and signed the Treaty of Rapallo with Germany. He begged Lenin to avoid wrecking the Genoa Conference since he believed that would make it easier to get foreign loans. Chicherin pursued a policy of collaboration with Germany and developed a closer working relationship with Brockdorff-Rantzau.

Chicherin also held diplomatic negotiations with the papal nuncio Eugenio Pacelli, the future Pope Pius XII, on the status of the Roman Catholic Church in the newly formed Soviet Union.

On 10 April 1923, Chicherin wrote a letter to fellow Politburo member Joseph Stalin, in which he described the international political fallout from the recent show trial and execution in the Lubyanka Prison on Easter Sunday of Monsignor Konstanty Budkiewicz. In America, France, and the United Kingdom, efforts to gain diplomatic recognition for the USSR had suffered a major setback. In Westminster, Labour MPs had been flooded by petitions "demanding the defense of Cieplak and Budkiewicz", by "worker's organizations", "dying socialists", and "professionalists". In the United States, Progressive Republican Senator William Borah had been about to discuss possible recognition of the USSR with U.S. Secretary of State Charles Evans Hughes. Due to the American people's outrage over Budkiewicz's execution, the meeting had been cancelled and the senator had been forced to indefinitely postpone the founding of a committee to press for diplomatic negotiations. Chicherin further explained to Stalin that the outside world saw the continuing Soviet anti-religious campaign, "as nothing other than naked religious persecution." Chicherin also expressed fear that, if Russian Orthodox Patriarch Tikhon were also sentenced to death, the news would, "worsen much further our international position in all our relations." He concluded by proposing "the rejection in advance of the death sentence on Tikhon".

Chicherin is thought to have had more phone conversations with Lenin than anyone else. When Joseph Stalin replaced Lenin in 1924, Chicherin remained foreign minister, and Stalin valued his opinions. In 1928, Chicherin stated that he wanted an improved relationship with capitalist countries to encourage foreign investment. That policy had Stalin's enthusiastic support and was approved by the Politburo in late 1927 and early 1928. Stalin said that "it can hardly be doubted that Comrade Chicherin is better informed about the mood in foreign investment circles than any of us".

Although known for his workaholic habits, Chicherin was sidelined from November 1926 to June 1927 and from September 1928 until January 1930, while receiving medical treatment in Germany or in the French Riviera. Chicherin showed considerable courage in writing letters criticising politicians and policies that were being pursued. In February 1927, Chicherin criticized Nikolai Bukharin for his speeches that had a negative attitude to Soviet–German relations: "This was particularly dangerous because of the deterioration of the relationship between the USSR and Britain." Chicherin said, "At a time when the British are working against us, we must take care of our relationship with other states. We have to nurture such relationships."

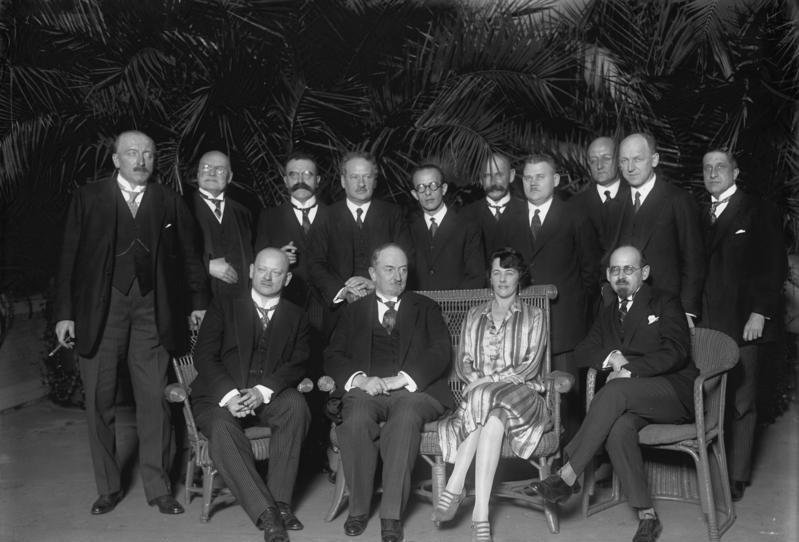
Chicherin is in the centre, between German Foreign Minister Gustav Stresemann and his wife, in Berlin in 1928 during a break from German–Lithuanian–Soviet negotiations.

On 3 June 1927, Chicherin, in a sanatorium in Germany, wrote about incidents that were detrimental to German–Soviet relations. He was exasperated "by some comrades who can do no better than ruin all our work by attacking Germany, spoiling everything once and for all." When Kliment Voroshilov made a speech at the 1929 May Day Parade attacking the Weimar Republic, Chicherin wrote to the Politburo that the speech would do irreparable damage to German–Soviet relations.

Chicherin played a major role in establishing formal relations with China and in designing the Kremlin's policy on China. He focused on the Chinese Eastern Railway, Manchuria, and the Mongolian issue.

== Personality ==
Chicherin was an eccentric, with obsessive work habits. Alexander Barmine, who worked in the People's Commissariat for Foreign Affairs, noted that "Chicherin was a man whose peculiar habits had to be respected. His workroom was completely buried in books, newspaper and documents ... He used to patter into our room in his shirt sleeves, wearing a large silk handkerchief round his neck and slippers adorned with metal buckles ... which, for comfort's sake, he never troubled to fasten, making a clicking noise on the floor." Arthur Ransome noted, in 1919:

Chicherin speaks as if he were a dead man or a ventriloquist's lay figure. He has never learnt the art of releasing himself from drudgery by handing over to his subordinates. He is permanently tired out. You feel it is almost cruel to say 'Good morning' to him when you meet him, because of the appeal to be left alone that comes unconsciously into his eyes. Partly in order to avoid people, partly because he is himself accustomed to work at night, his section of the foreign office keeps extraordinary hours, is not to be found till about five in the afternoon and works till four in the morning.

== Later life ==
In 1930 Chicherin was formally replaced by his deputy, Maxim Litvinov. A continuing terminal illness burdened his last years, which forced him away from his circle of friends and active work and led to an early death. When Chicherin died in 1936, the official state newspaper Izvestia summarised his character by describing him as highly educated, an exceptional diplomat and a sophisticated art lover.

After his death and until the Khrushchev Thaw, he was rarely mentioned in Soviet literature although he was mentioned in the Soviet Diplomatic Dictionary in an article occupying 52 pages in the 1950 edition, compared with Litvinov's 92 pages and Vyacheslav Molotov's 292 pages.

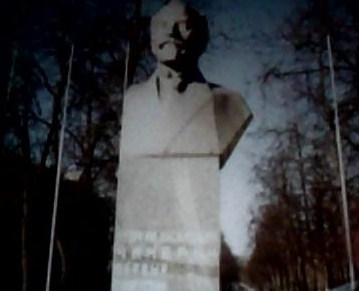
The Chicherin monument in Kaluga is on the street that bears his name.

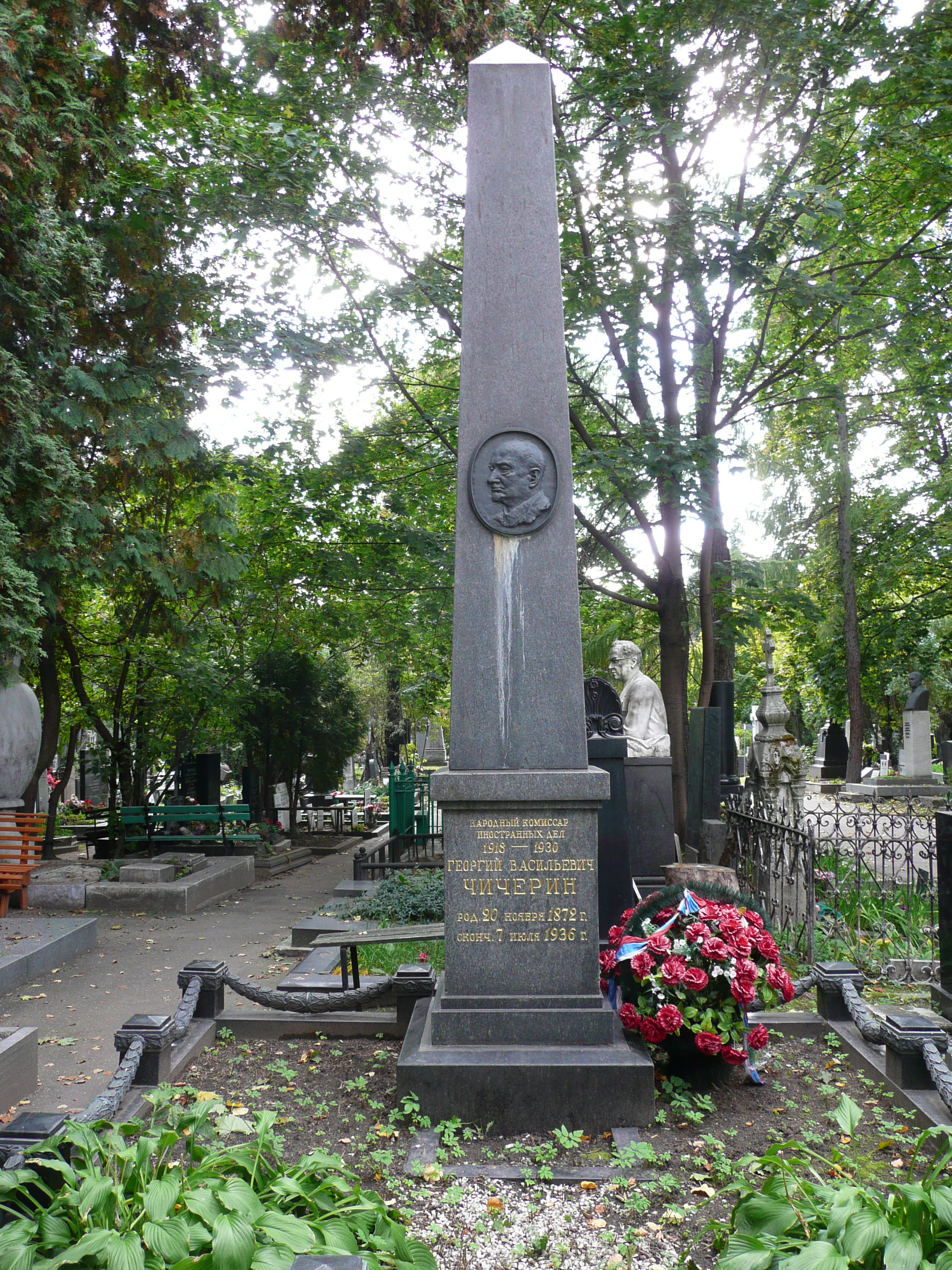
Gravestone of Georgy Chicherin, Novodevichy Cemetery, Moscow

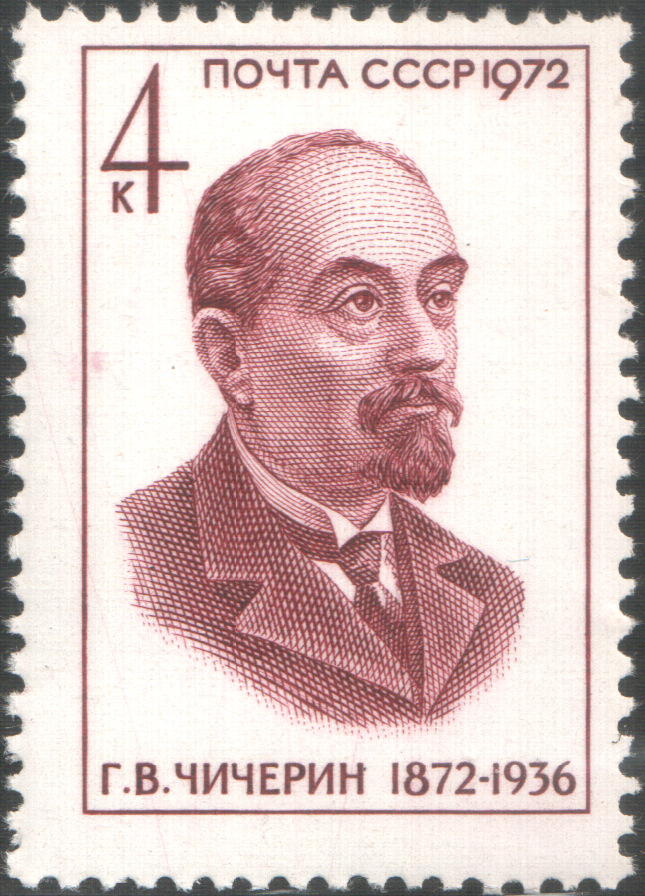
1974 Soviet stamp with the image of Georgi Chicherin

== See also ==
- Foreign relations of the Soviet Union

== Sources ==
- Debo, Richard K. "The Making of a Bolshevik: Georgii Chicherin in England 1914–1918", Slavic Review, vol. 25, no. 4 (Dec. 1966), pp. 651–662. In JSTOR.
- Grant, Ron. "G.V. Chicherin and the Russian revolutionary cause in Great Britain". Immigrants & Minorities 2.3 (1983): 117–138.
- Hodgson, Robert. "Commissar Chicherin". History Today (Sep 1954) 4#9, pp. 613–617
- O'Connor, Timothy Edward. Diplomacy and Revolution: G.V. Chicherin and Soviet Foreign Affairs, 1918–1930, Ames, Iowa State University Press, 1988.
- O'Connor, Timothy E. "G. V. Chicherin and the Soviet View of the League of Nations in the 1920s" European Studies Journal (1989), 6#1 pp 1–17.
- Rosenbaum, Kurt. Community of Fate: German–Soviet Diplomatic Relations 1922–1928 (Syracuse University Press, 1965).

Political offices
Preceded by Leon Trotsky	People's Commissar for Foreign Affairs; 1918–1930	Succeeded by Maxim Litvinov
