= Leonid Butkevich =

Soviet military sniper (1918–1985)

- Леонид Владимирович Буткевич
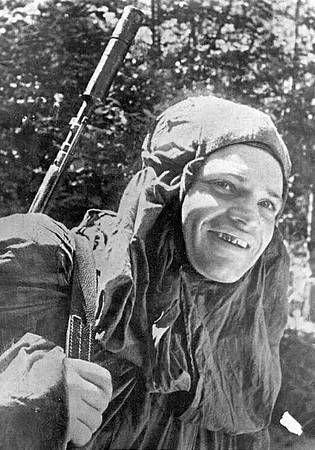
- Butkevich in 1944
- Born: 25 March 1918; Khotlino village, Vitebsk Region
- Died: 12 November 1985 (aged 67); Yessentuki, Soviet Union
- Military career
- Allegiance: Soviet Union
- Branch: Red Army
- Service years: 1937–1945
- Rank: Lieutenant
- Unit: 1331st Rifle Regiment
- Conflicts: World War II; Invasion of Poland; Eastern Front
- Awards: Hero of the Soviet Union

Leonid Vladimirovich Butkevich (Russian: Леонид Владимирович Буткевич; 25 March 1918 – 12 November 1985) was one of the top Soviet snipers of World War II. He was awarded the title Hero of the Soviet Union on 25 October 1943 for killing 315 enemy soldiers.

== Early life ==
He was born on 25 March 1918 to a Belarusian peasant family in Khotlino village. In 1935 he graduated from the technical school of railway workers before becoming the head of the Kolodnya railway station. He practiced sharpshooting at the Osoaviakhim club, which later proved useful in the military. In 1937 he was drafted into the Red Army and participated in the Soviet invasion of Poland.

== World War II ==
From the very first day of the fight against the Nazi invasion of the Soviet Union, Butkevich was on the frontlines fighting against the enemy. He proved himself as a skilled sniper and showed courage in the battles for the Caucasus and Crimea, and rose to the position of platoon commander. On 30 October 1942 he was awarded the Order of the Red Banner for killing 93 Nazis and training 25 more snipers. In July 1943 he was nominated for the title Hero of the Soviet Union for personally killing 315 enemies as a sniper and training 50 snipers, and on 25 October 1943 he was awarded the title. By the end of the war he killed at least 325 Nazis, although estimates of his total number of kills varies between sources, usually somewhere in the 300s. Ogonyok magazine issue no. 23-24 of 1944 credited him with 450 kills, but this number is generally considered dubious.

== Later life ==
After being demobilized from the military in December 1945, he lived in Yessentuki and worked as head of a photography workshop. He died on 12 November 1985.
