= Georgy Butkevich =

Russian power engineer (1903–1974)

- Born: Georgy Vladimirovich Butkevich; August 24, 1903; Rusanovo, Tula Governorate, Russian Empire (now Rusano, Odoyevsky District, Russia)
- Died: August 1974 (aged 70–71)
- Occupation: Power engineer

Georgy (Yuri) Vladimirovich Butkevich (Russian: Георгий (Юрий) Владимирович Буткевич; 24 August 1903 – August 1974) was a Soviet and Russian power engineer and a specialist in the field of high-voltage electrical equipment. He was a professor, a Doctor of Technical Sciences, a winner of the USSR State Prize and the Lenin Prize.

== Biography ==
Georgy Vladimirovich Butkevich was born in the village of Rusanovo, Odoyevsky District of Tula Governorate in the family of Vladimir Sergeyevich Butkevich, who was a pInstituteat the Moscow Agricultural Institute.

In 1927 he graduated from the Electrotechnical Faculty of Bauman Moscow State Technical University. Since 1926 he worked at the Lenin Institute of Economics, and since 1934 he was the head of the Design and Construction Department of the first laboratory of explosive capacity in the Soviet Union, then he was appointed the head of this laboratory. Since 1946, he was also the head of the Special Design Bureau for High-Voltage Apparatus Engineering.

In 1927 he began working at the Moscow Power Engineering Institute. In the late 1950s he was the Deputy Director of the Institute. From 1961 to 1972 he was the head of the Department of Electrical Apparatus.

He was a Doctor of Technical Sciences since 1938 (thesis topic "Ion-mechanical high voltage switch"), and a professor since 1939. In 1949 he was awarded the Stalin Prize of the third degree for the development and implementation of a new series of devices for high voltage switchgears; in 1962 he was also awarded the Lenin Prize for participation in the creation of a complex of high voltage equipment with a voltage of 500 kV AC.

Butkevich was the author of 9 textbooks. He also played the violin and was a painter. He died in August 1974.

== Literature ==
- МЭИ: история, люди, годы: сборник воспоминаний. В 3 томах, 2010, Москва. «Издательский дом МЭИ» с. 131.
- Доктор технических наук Георгий Владимирович Буткевич. (К 70-летию со дня рожд. и 45-летию науч.-пед. деят-сти) «Электричество», 1973, No 11
