= Konstanty Budkiewicz =

Polish-Latvian priest (1867–1923)

Servant of God Konstanty Budkiewicz
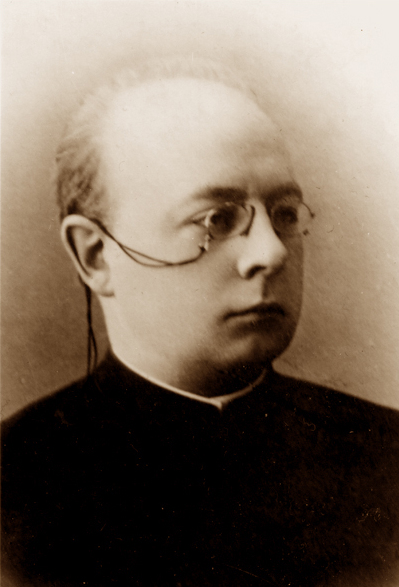
- Konstanty Budkiewicz, c. 1910

Martyr
- Born: June 19, 1867; Krāslava
- Died: March 31, 1923 (aged 55); Moscow, Russia

Konstanty Romuald Budkiewicz (Russian: Константин Ромуальд Юлианович Будкевич; June 19, 1867, – March 31, 1923) was a Polish Catholic priest executed by the OGPU after a sham trial for "organizing nonviolent resistance against the first Soviet anti-religious campaign." His beatification process has been opened, thus giving him the title Servant of God.

== Early life ==
Budkevich was born June 19, 1867, to a large Polish nobility family in Zubry manor near the town of Krāslava in modern Latvia. His father, Julian, was a forester on the Broel-Plater estate, while his mother, Maria née Borkowska, ran the household. He had five sisters and one brother.

In 1882–1883 he studied at Hermann Hiller’s private progymnasium in Kielce, and later at the municipal gymnasium in Lublin. In 1886 he entered the Roman Catholic Seminary in St. Petersburg, from which he was transferred in 1890 to the Roman Catholic Theological Academy, which he completed in 1893. He was ordained to the priesthood in 1893 and taught in Pskov since February 1893, and, from 1896, in Vitebsk.

== St. Petersburg ==
In 1903, he served the parish of St. Catherine on Nevsky Prospect in St. Petersburg, becoming pastor there in 1905. At the time, St. Petersburg was the center of the Empire's largest Polish community outside of Congress Poland and Budkiewicz desired to prevent the children of his parish from the anti-Polish and anti-Catholic propaganda of the state-run school system. Therefore, despite "manifold difficulties", he maintained a Polish language parochial school attached to St. Catherine's parish. He raised the academic standards of both the girls’ and boys’ gymnasiums, founded a vocational school for girls in 1907, and also established five elementary schools. He also created self-education circles for the poorest, operating under the auspices of the Polish Educational Society.

Following the February Revolution, then Archbishop Eduard von der Ropp, decreed that all his priests would take a role in organizing a Christian Democratic Party to participate in the planned Russian Constituent Assembly. In this, the Archbishop was opposed by Budkiewicz and by auxiliary bishop Jan Cieplak, who both opposed any politicization of the Catholic religion.

== Red October and its aftermath ==
In 1918, he became vicar-general to Bishop Cieplak.

According to Francis McCullagh,

The Bolsheviks were not long in power before they realized that this polite and gentle-mannered Monsignor was the backbone of all the legitimate resistance offered to some of their impossible decrees by the Catholic clergy of Petrograd. They therefore persecuted him so persistently that disguised in lay clothes, had for a time to carry out his work from a place of concealment. Then came a period of calm, but, towards the end of 1922, the Petrograd Reds lost all patience and determined to have Mgr. Budkiewicz's blood at all costs. They had their way, but, as we shall see later, they had not the satisfaction of seeing their victim falter or even lose colour when the sentence of death was passed on him.

According to princess Martha Edith Almedingen, "Sunday after Sunday at St. Catherine's he preached his simple unsophisticated sermons, and the keynote to all of them was, 'God is love, and it is given to us to be his true children.'"

== Cieplak trial ==
He was arrested March 13, 1923, in connection with the case brought against the Catholic clergy, with Archbishop Cieplak at their head. The GPU feared that Cieplak was planning to unite the Orthodox Christians that followed Patriarch Tikhon with the Catholic Church. As Patriarch Tikhon was under house arrest on false charges of "anti-Soviet and counterrevolutionary activities", this "conspiracy" implicated Cieplak, Budkiewicz, and Byzantine-rite exarch Leonid Feodorov in anti-Soviet agitation.

According to Christopher Lawrence Zugger,

The Bolsheviks had already orchestrated several 'show trials.' The Cheka had staged the 'Trial of the St. Petersburg Combat Organization'; its successor, the new GPU, the 'Trial of the Socialist Revolutionaries.' In these and other such farces, defendants were inevitably sentenced to death or to long prison terms in the north. The Cieplak show trial is a prime example of Bolshevik revolutionary justice at this time. Normal judicial procedures did not restrict revolutionary tribunals at all; in fact, the prosecutor N.V. Krylenko, stated that the courts could trample upon the rights of classes other than the proletariat. Appeals from the courts went not to a higher court, but to political committees. Western observers found the setting – the grand ballroom of a former Noblemen's Club, with painted cherubs on the ceiling – singularly inappropriate for such a solemn event. Neither judges nor prosecutors were required to have a legal background, only a proper 'revolutionary' one. That the prominent 'No Smoking' signs were ignored by the judges themselves did not bode well for legalities.

New York Herald correspondent Francis McCullagh, who was present at the trial, later described its fourth day as follows:

Krylenko, who began to speak at 6:10 PM, was moderate enough at first, but quickly launched into an attack on religion in general and the Catholic Church in particular. "The Catholic Church", he declared, "has always exploited the working classes." When he demanded the Archbishop's death, he said, "All the Jesuitical duplicity with which you have defended yourself will not save you from the death penalty. No Pope in the Vatican can save you now." ... As the long oration proceeded, the Red Procurator worked himself into a fury of anti-religious hatred. "Your religion", he yelled, "I spit on it, as I do on all religions, – on Orthodox, Jewish, Mohammedan, and the rest." "There is no law here but Soviet Law," he yelled at another stage, "and by that law you must die."

Also according to McCullagh,

My first glace at Mgr. Budkiewicz showed me clearly why the Bolsheviks were so infuriated with him that nothing but his death would satisfy them. Not only was he immovable himself, but (in the opinion of the Bolsheviks) he made others unmovable. Then his matter was, for a Slav, curiously cold and impassive. In speaking, he used no gestures, and did not move his body in the slightest; but in private life he was extremely humorous. Circumstances compelled him to restrain himself, but he conveyed, somehow, the impression of having it in him to pierce Bolshevism with a satire keener than a rapier; and it surely is one of the ironies of life that while Leninism is being dealt with almost exclusively by non-Russians who do not know much about it, or by Russians whose absence abroad has made them equally ignorant, this accomplished man, who knew Red Russia through and through, should first have been prevented by his position from telling all he knew about it, and should then have had his brains blown out by an official assassin.

On Palm Sunday, 1923, Cieplak and Budkiewicz were sentenced to death. The other fifteen defendants were sentenced to long terms in the gulag. In the aftermath of sentencing, all were returned to their cells in Moscow's Butyrka prison.

== Martyrdom ==
According to Christopher Lawrence Zugger,

The Vatican, Germany, Poland, Great Britain, and the United States undertook frantic efforts to save the Archbishop and his chancellor. In Moscow, the ministers from the Polish, British, Czechoslovak, and Italian missions appealed "on the grounds of humanity," and Poland offered to exchange any prisoner to save the archbishop and the monsignor. Finally, on March 29, the Archbishop's sentence was commuted to ten years in prison, ... but the Monsignor was not to be spared. Again, there were appeals from foreign powers, from Western Socialists and Church leaders alike. These appeals were for naught: Pravda editorialized on March 30 that the tribunal was defending the rights of the workers, who had been oppressed by the bourgeois system for centuries with the aid of priests. Pro-Communist foreigners who intervened for the two men were also condemned as "compromisers with the priestly servants of the bourgeoisie."

According to the priest Francis Rutkowski, who was imprisoned with Budkiewicz,

The days between March 25th and March 31st, until he was taken to a special cell, passed as if nothing special were likely to befall him. On Good Friday, March 30th, fellow prisoners read in the newspaper how the Archbishop's sentence had been commuted and how the Monsignor's sentence had been carried out. At this time, the Monsignor was not in the cell. When he returned, his fellow prisoners did not tell him at first that he had been refused grace; after a while, they told him and showed him the paper. Then he quickly said that it was not necessary to hide the fact from him, but that he was ready for everything. When on the invitation of the Archbishop, Mgr. Malecki privately suggested to Mgr. Budkiewicz that he might prepare for death, he answered that he was completely at peace, ready for everything, that he was little understood, and that God alone knew how he had offered himself for all his faults. On saying these last words, with tears in his eyes, he totally and completely surrendered himself to the Divine Will. On Holy Saturday, March 31st, about ten o'clock, he was taken from our cell to No. 42, which was used for solitary confinement. He quietly said goodbye to us all, forseeing that he would see us no more. That same evening, he sent back a Russian book which he had taken with him as he left us. He had written in it that he was alone in No. 42, that it was clean and warm there. Some secular prisoners who were with us, Russians and non-Catholics, and who had continually observed his behavior, wondered with great admiration at him because he was so peaceful; they called him happy because he suffered and died for a good cause. One of the prisoners who lived on the same corridor as Mgr. Budkiewicz told us how in the evening of March 31st, he bathed and had tea. Around half past eleven at night, two men came, told him to take his things and led him to an automobile waiting in the yard. He answered that they did not give him peace even at night. He himself was completely at peace when he said goodbye to the prisoner in the corridor, gave him cigars, and went to the automobile. According to what we read in the newspapers, he was executed during the night of March 31st, between Holy Saturday and Easter Sunday. He was shot from behind, as he stepped down into the cellars of the Lubianka.

== Legacy ==
After the execution of Budkiewicz, his body was buried in a mass grave in the forests of the Sokolniki District.

According to Christopher Zugger,

On Easter Sunday, the world was told that the Monsignor was still alive, and Pope Pius XI publicly prayed at St. Peter's that the Soviets would spare his life. Moscow officials told foreign ministers and reporters that the Monsignor's sentence was just, and that the Soviet Union was a sovereign nation that would accept no interference. In reply to an appeal from the rabbis of New York City to spare Budkiewicz's life, Pravda wrote a blistering editorial against 'Jewish bankers who rule the world' and bluntly warned that the Soviets would kill Jewish opponents of the Revolution as well. Only on April 4 did the truth finally emerge: the Monsignor had already been in the grave for three days. When the news came to Rome, Pope Pius fell to his knees and wept as he prayed for the priest's soul. To make matters worse, Cardinal Gasparri had just finished reading a note from the Soviets saying that "everything was proceeding satisfactorily" when he was handed the telegram announcing the execution.

News of Budkevich's execution caused turmoil in France, whose Catholic population deplored the incident and saw it as an example of the police state tactics of the new Soviet Union.

On 7 April 1923, a requiem mass was offered for Budkiewicz at St. Catherine's Cathedral in St. Petersburg. Several foreign diplomats were in attendance.

On 10 April 1923, Soviet Foreign Commissar Georgy Chicherin wrote a letter to fellow Politburo member Joseph Stalin, in which he described the political fallout from the death of Budkiewicz. In America, France, and the United Kingdom, efforts to gain diplomatic recognition for the USSR had suffered a major setback. In Westminster, Labour MPs had been flooded by petitions "demanding the defense of Cieplak and Budkiewicz", by "worker's organizations", "dying socialists", and "professionalists". In the United States, Republican Senator William Borah had been about to discuss possible recognition of the USSR with U.S. Secretary of State Charles Evans Hughes. Due to Budkevich's execution, the meeting had been cancelled and the senator had been forced to indefinitely postpone the founding of a committee to press for diplomatic negotiations. Chicherin explained that the outside world saw the continuing anti-religious campaign "as nothing other than naked religious persecution." Chicherin expressed fear that, if Russian Orthodox Patriarch Tikhon were also sentenced to death, the news would, "worsen much further our international position in all our relations." He concluded by proposing "the rejection in advance of the death sentence on Tikhon".

Budkiewicz's cause for sainthood was opened in 2003 and remains under investigation. His current title is Servant of God. At St. Catherine's Cathedral, his stole is preserved as a relic. A street in Warsaw, Poland, is also named for him.

== In popular culture ==
- In 1924, McCullagh published the full text of the Cieplak show trial within a book entitled The Bolshevik Persecution of Christianity, which was swiftly translated into French, German and Spanish.
- Also in 1924, Kazimiera Iłłakowiczówna, a highly important figure in Polish poetry, published a book of poems in honor of Budkiewicz's life and death. Modeled after the traditional oral poetry of the Polish peasantry, the collection was titled Opowieść o moskiewskim męczeństwie ("The Story of the Moscow Martyr").
