= Geostrategy =

Type of foreign policy guided principally by geographical factors

Geostrategy, a subfield of geopolitics, is a type of foreign policy guided principally by geographical factors as they inform, constrain, or affect political and military planning. As with all strategies, geostrategy is concerned with matching means to ends. Strategy is as intertwined with geography as geography is with nationhood, or as Colin S. Gray and Geoffrey Sloan state it, "[geography is] the mother of strategy."

Geostrategists, as distinct from geopoliticians, approach geopolitics from a nationalist point of view. Geostrategies are relevant principally to the context in which they were devised: the strategist's nation, the historically rooted national impulses, the strength of the country's resources, the scope of the country's goals, the political geography of the time period, and the technological factors that affect military, political, economic, and cultural engagement. Geostrategy can function prescriptively, advocating foreign policy based on geographic and historical factors, analytically, describing how foreign policy is shaped by geography and history, or predictively, projecting a country's future foreign policy decisions and outcomes.

Many geostrategists are also geographers, specializing in subfields of geography, such as human geography, political geography, economic geography, cultural geography, military geography, and strategic geography. Geostrategy is most closely related to strategic geography.

Especially following World War II, some scholars divide geostrategy into two schools: the uniquely German organic state theory; and, the broader Anglo-American geostrategies.

== Definition ==
Most definitions of geostrategy below emphasize the merger of strategic considerations with geopolitical factors. While geopolitics is ostensibly neutral — examining the geographic and political features of different regions, especially the impact of geography on politics — geostrategy involves comprehensive planning, assigning means for achieving national goals or securing assets of military or political significance.

=== Original definition ===
The term "geo-strategy" was first used by Frederick L. Schuman in his 1942 article "Let Us Learn Our Geopolitics." It was a translation of the German term "Wehrgeopolitik" as used by German geostrategist Karl Haushofer. Previous translations had been attempted, such as "defense-geopolitics". Robert Strausz-Hupé had coined and popularized "war geopolitics" as another alternate translation.

=== Modern definitions ===
[G]eostrategy is about the exercise of power over particularly critical spaces on the Earth's surface; about crafting a political presence over the international system. It is aimed at enhancing one's security and prosperity; about making the international system more prosperous; about shaping rather than being shaped. A geostrategy is about securing access to certain trade routes, strategic bottlenecks, rivers, islands and seas. It requires an extensive military presence, normally coterminous with the opening of overseas military stations and the building of warships capable of deep oceanic power projection. It also requires a network of alliances with other great powers who share one's aims or with smaller "lynchpin states" that are located in the regions one deems important.

— James Rogers and Luis Simón, "Think Again: European Geostrategy"

[T]he words geopolitical, strategic, and geostrategic are used to convey the following meanings: geopolitical reflects the combination of geographic and political factors determining the condition of a state or region, and emphasizing the impact of geography on politics; strategic refers to the comprehensive and planned application of measures to achieve a central goal or to vital assets of military significance; and geostrategic merges strategic consideration with geopolitical ones.

— Zbigniew Brzezinski, Game Plan (emphasis in original)

For the United States, Eurasian geostrategy involves the purposeful management of geostrategically dynamic states and the careful handling of geopolitically catalytic states, in keeping with the twin interests of America in the short-term preservation of its unique global power and in the long-run transformation of it into increasingly institutionalized global cooperation. To put it in a terminology that hearkens back to the more brutal age of ancient empires, the three grand imperatives of imperial geostrategy are to prevent collusion and maintain security dependence among the vassals, to keep tributaries pliant and protected, and to keep the barbarians from coming together.

— Zbigniew Brzezinski, The Grand Chessboard

Geostrategy is the geographic direction of a state's foreign policy. More precisely, geostrategy describes where a state concentrates its efforts by projecting military power and directing diplomatic activity. The underlying assumption is that states have limited resources and are unable, even if they are willing, to conduct a tous asimuths foreign policy. Instead they must focus politically and militarily on specific areas of the world. Geostrategy describes this foreign-policy thrust of a state and does not deal with motivation or decision-making processes. The geostrategy of a state, therefore, is not necessarily motivated by geographic or geopolitical factors. A state may project power to a location because of ideological reasons, interest groups, or simply the whim of its leader.

— Jakub J. Grygiel, Great Powers and Geopolitical Change (emphasis in original)

It is recognized that the term "geo-strategy" is more often used, in current writing, in a global context, denoting the consideration of global land-sea distribution, distances, and accessibility among other geographical factors in strategic planning and action... Here the definition of geo-strategy is used in a more limited regional frame wherein the sum of geographic factors interact to influence or to give advantage to one adversary, or intervene to modify strategic planning as well as political and military venture.

— Lim Joo-Jock, Geo-Strategy and the South China Sea Basin. (emphasis in original)

A science named "geo-strategy" would be unimaginable in any other period of history but ours. It is the characteristic product of turbulent twentieth-century world politics.

— Andrew Gyorgi, The Geopolitics of War: Total War and Geostrategy (1943).

"Geostrategy,"—a word of uncertain meaning—has ... been avoided.

— Stephen B. Jones, "The Power Inventory and National Strategy"

Geostrategy is the geographic direction of a state's foreign policy. More precisely, geostrategy describes where a state concentrates its efforts by projecting military power and directing diplomatic activity. The underlying assumption is that states have limited resources and are unable, even if they are willing, to conduct an all-out foreign policy. Instead they must focus politically and militarily on specific areas of the world. Geostrategy describes the foreign-policy thrust of a state and does not deal with motivations or decision-making processes. The geostrategy of a state, therefore, is not necessarily motivated by geographic or geopolitical factors. A state may project power to a location because of ideological reasons, interest groups, or simply the whim of its leader.

— Krishnendra Meena, "Munesh Chandra asked: What is the difference between geo-politics and geo-strategy?"

== Theory and methodology ==
As a science or science-based political practice geostrategy uses factual and empirical analysis, theoretical formulations in geostrategy usually heavily rely on empirical base although facts-values relations or conclusions are differently observed by different and/or competitive geostrategic approaches. Geostrategic conceptions that stem from the theory become the base for the countries' foreign and international policies. Geostrategic conceptions have also historically been acquired or even inherited from one country to another due to common history, relations between the countries, culture and even propaganda.

The geostrategy of location include river valleys, inland sea, world ocean, world island, and so on. For instance, the start of Western civilization was located in the river valleys of the Nile in Egypt and the Tigris and Euphrates in Mesopotamia. The Nile and Tigris and Euphrates not only provided the fertile soil for crop production, but also allowed for the floods that taxed the ingenuity of the inhabitants. The climate of the area was conducive to an existence based primarily upon agriculture. The rivers also provided the avenues of trade in a period when muscles of man and the winds of the sky were the motive power of ships. The river valleys became a unifying factor in the political development of the people.

== History ==
=== Precursors ===
As early as Herodotus, observers saw strategy as heavily influenced by the geographic setting of the actors. In History, Herodotus describes a clash of civilizations between the Egyptians, Persians, Scythians, and Greeks—all of which he believed were heavily influenced by the physical geographic setting.

Dietrich Heinrich von Bülow proposed a geometrical science of strategy in the 1799 The Spirit of the Modern System of War. His system predicted that the larger states would swallow the smaller ones, resulting in eleven large states. Mackubin Thomas Owens notes the similarity between von Bülow's predictions and the map of Europe after the unification of Germany and of Italy.

=== Golden age ===
Between 1890 and 1919 the world became a geostrategist's paradise, leading to the formulation of the classical geopolitical theories. The international system featured rising and falling great powers, many with global reach. There were no new frontiers for the great powers to explore or colonize—the entire world was divided between the empires and colonial powers. From this point forward, international politics would feature the struggles of state against state.

Two strains of geopolitical thought gained prominence: an Anglo-American school, and a German school. Alfred Thayer Mahan and Halford J. Mackinder outlined the American and British conceptions of geostrategy, respectively, in their works The Problem of Asia and "The Geographical Pivot of History". Friedrich Ratzel and Rudolf Kjellén developed an organic theory of the state which laid the foundation for Germany's unique school of geostrategy.

=== World War II ===
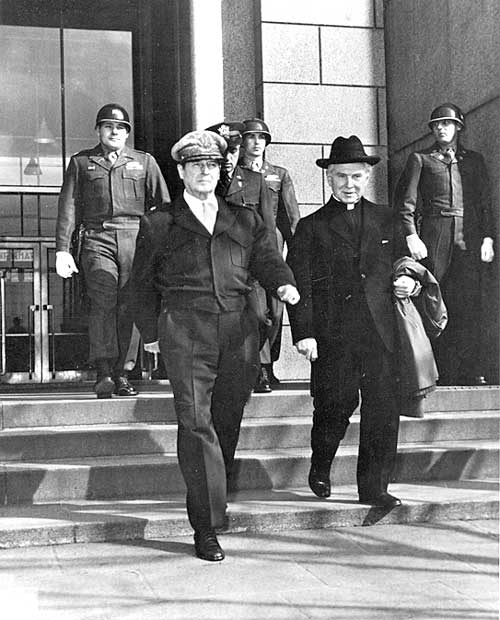
Fr. Edmund A. Walsh, SJ

The most prominent German geopolitician was General Karl Haushofer. After World War II, during the Allied occupation of Germany, the United States investigated many officials and public figures to determine if they should face charges of war crimes at the Nuremberg trials. Haushofer, an academic primarily, was interrogated by Father Edmund A. Walsh, a professor of geopolitics from the Georgetown School of Foreign Service, at the request of the U.S. authorities. Despite his involvement in crafting one of the justifications for Nazi aggression, Fr. Walsh determined that Haushofer ought not stand trial.

=== Cold War ===
After the Second World War, the term "geopolitics" fell into disrepute, because of its association with Nazi geopolitik. Virtually no books published between the end of World War II and the mid-1970s used the word "geopolitics" or "geostrategy" in their titles, and geopoliticians did not label themselves or their works as such. German theories prompted a number of critical examinations of geopolitik by American geopoliticians such as Robert Strausz-Hupé, Derwent Whittlesey and Andrew Gyorgy.

As the Cold War began, N.J. Spykman and George F. Kennan laid down the foundations for the U.S. policy of containment, which would dominate Western geostrategic thought for the next forty years.

Alexander de Seversky would propose that airpower had fundamentally changed geostrategic considerations and thus proposed a "geopolitics of airpower." His ideas had some influence on the administration of President Dwight D. Eisenhower, but the ideas of Spykman and Kennan would exercise greater weight. Later during the Cold War, Colin Gray would decisively reject the idea that airpower changed geostrategic considerations, while Saul B. Cohen examined the idea of a "shatterbelt", which would eventually inform the domino theory.

=== Post-Cold War ===
After the Cold War ended, states started preferring management of space at low cost to expansion of it with military force. Use of military force in order to secure space causes not only great burden on countries, but also severe criticism from the international society as interdependence between countries continuously increases. As a way of new space management, countries either created regional institutions related to the space or make regimes on specific issues to allow intervention on space. Such mechanisms let countries to have indirect control over space. The indirect space management reduces required capital and at the same time provides justification and legitimacy of the management, that the countries involved do not have to face criticism from the international society.

== Notable geostrategists ==
The below geostrategists were instrumental in founding and developing the major geostrategic doctrines in the discipline's history. While there have been many other geostrategists, these have been the most influential in shaping and developing the field as a whole.

=== Alfred Thayer Mahan ===
Alfred Thayer Mahan was a U.S. Navy officer and president of the Naval War College. He is best known for his Influence of Sea Power upon History series of books, which argued that naval supremacy was the deciding factor in great power warfare. In 1900, Mahan's book The Problem of Asia was published. In this volume he laid out the first geostrategy of the modern era.

The Problem of Asia divides the continent of Asia into 3 zones:

- A northern zone, located above the 40th parallel north, characterized by its cold climate, and dominated by land power;
- The "Debatable and Debated" zone, located between the 40th and 30th parallels, characterized by a temperate climate; and,
- A southern zone, located below the 30th parallel north, characterized by its hot climate, and dominated by sea power.

The Debated and Debatable zone, Mahan observed, contained two peninsulas on either end (Anatolia and the Korea), the Isthmus of Suez, Palestine, Syria, Mesopotamia, two countries marked by their mountain ranges (Persia and Afghanistan), the Pamir Mountains, the Tibetan Himalayas, the Yangtze Valley, and Japan. Within this zone, Mahan asserted that there were no strong states capable of withstanding outside influence or capable even of maintaining stability within their own borders. So whereas the political situations to the north and south were relatively stable and determined, the middle remained "debatable and debated ground."

North of the 40th parallel, the vast expanse of Asia was dominated by the Russian Empire. Russia possessed a central position on the continent, and a wedge-shaped projection into Central Asia, bounded by the Caucasus Mountains and Caspian Sea on one side and the mountains of Afghanistan and Western China on the other side. To prevent Russian expansionism and achievement of predominance on the Asian continent, Mahan believed pressure on Asia's flanks could be the only viable strategy pursued by sea powers.

South of the 30th parallel lay areas dominated by the sea powers – the United Kingdom, the United States, Germany, and Japan. To Mahan, the possession of India by the United Kingdom was of key strategic importance, as India was best suited for exerting balancing pressure against Russia in Central Asia. The United Kingdom's predominance in Egypt, China, Australia, and the Cape of Good Hope was also considered important.

The strategy of sea powers, according to Mahan, ought to be to deny Russia the benefits of commerce that come from sea commerce. He noted that both the Turkish Straits and Danish Straits could be closed by a hostile power, thereby denying Russia access to the sea. Further, this disadvantageous position would reinforce Russia's proclivity toward expansionism in order to obtain wealth or warm water ports. Natural geographic targets for Russian expansionism in search of access to the sea would therefore be the Chinese seaboard, the Persian Gulf, and Asia Minor.

In this contest between land power and sea power, Russia would find itself allied with France (a natural sea power, but in this case necessarily acting as a land power), arrayed against Germany, Britain, Japan, and the United States as sea powers. Further, Mahan conceived of a unified, modern state composed of Turkey, Syria, and Mesopotamia, possessing an efficiently organized army and navy to stand as a counterweight to Russian expansion.

Further dividing the map by geographic features, Mahan stated that the two most influential lines of division would be the Suez and Panama Canals. As most developed nations and resources lay above the North–South divide, politics and commerce north of the two canals would be of much greater importance than those occurring south of the canals. As such, the great progress of historical development would not flow from north to south, but from east to west, in this case leading toward Asia as the locus of advance.

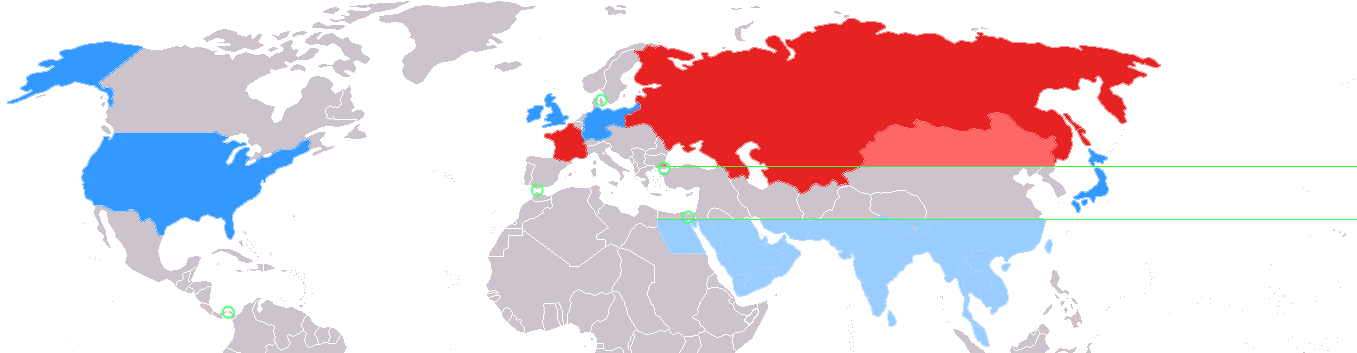
This map depicts the world as divided by geostrategist Alfred Thayer Mahan in his 1900 piece The Problem of Asia. Asia is divided along the 30 north and 40 north parallels, represented here by green lines. In between the 30th and 40th parallel is what Mahan termed the "Debatable and debated ground," subject to competition between the land powers and sea powers. The two allied land powers, the Russian Empire and France The portions of Asia above the 40th parallel under effective influence of Russian land power The four allied sea powers, Great Britain, the German Empire, Japan, and the United States The portions of Asia below the 30th parallel subject to effective control by sea power Key waterways identified by Mahan: the Suez Canal, Panama Canal, Turkish Straits, Strait of Gibraltar, and Danish Straits.

=== Halford J. Mackinder ===
Halford J. Mackinder's major work, Democratic ideals and reality: a study in the politics of reconstruction, appeared in 1919.[12] It presented his theory of the Heartland and made a case for fully taking into account geopolitical factors at the Paris Peace conference and contrasted (geographical) reality with Woodrow Wilson's idealism. The book's most famous quote was: "Who rules East Europe commands the Heartland; Who rules the Heartland commands the World Island; Who rules the World Island commands the World."

This message was composed to convince the world statesmen at the Paris Peace conference of the crucial importance of Eastern Europe as the strategic route to the Heartland was interpreted as requiring a strip of buffer state to separate Germany and Russia. These were created by the peace negotiators but proved to be ineffective bulwarks in 1939 (although this may be seen as a failure of other, later statesmen during the interbellum). The principal concern of his work was to warn of the possibility of another major war (a warning also given by economist John Maynard Keynes).

Mackinder was anti-Bolshevik, and as British High Commissioner in Southern Russia in late 1919 and early 1920, he stressed the need for Britain to continue her support to the White Russian forces, which he attempted to unite.

Mackinder's work paved the way for the establishment of geography as a distinct discipline in the United Kingdom. His role in fostering the teaching of geography is probably greater than that of any other single British geographer.

Whilst Oxford did not appoint a professor of Geography until 1934, both the University of Liverpool and University of Wales, Aberystwyth established professorial chairs in Geography in 1917. Mackinder himself became a full professor in geography in the University of London (London School of Economics) in 1923.

Mackinder is often credited with introducing two new terms into the English language: "manpower" and "heartland".

The Heartland Theory was enthusiastically taken up by the German school of Geopolitik, in particular by its main proponent Karl Haushofer. Geopolitik was later embraced by the German Nazi regime in the 1930s. The German interpretation of the Heartland Theory is referred to explicitly (without mentioning the connection to Mackinder) in The Nazis Strike, the second of Frank Capra's "Why We Fight" series of American World War II propaganda films.

The Heartland Theory and more generally classical geopolitics and geostrategy were extremely influential in the making of US strategic policy during the period of the Cold War.

Evidence of Mackinder's Heartland Theory can be found in the works of geopolitician Dimitri Kitsikis, particularly in his geopolitical model "Intermediate Region".

=== Friedrich Ratzel ===
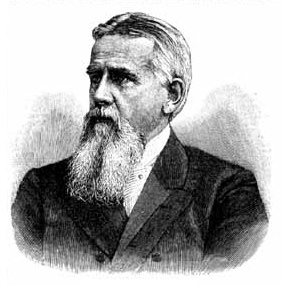
Friedrich Ratzel.

Influenced by the works of Alfred Thayer Mahan, as well as the German geographers Carl Ritter and Alexander von Humboldt, Friedrich Ratzel would lay the foundations for geopolitik, Germany's unique strain of geopolitics.

Ratzel wrote on the natural division between land powers and sea powers, agreeing with Mahan that sea power was self-sustaining, as the profit from trade would support the development of a merchant marine. However, his key contribution were the development of the concepts of raum and the organic theory of the state. He theorized that states were organic and growing, and that borders were only temporary, representing pauses in their natural movement. Raum was the land, spiritually connected to a nation (in this case, the German peoples), from which the people could draw sustenance, find adjacent inferior nations which would support them, and which would be fertilized by their kultur (culture).

Ratzel's ideas would influence the works of his student Rudolf Kjellén, as well as those of General Karl Haushofer.

=== Rudolf Kjellén ===
Rudolf Kjellén was a Swedish political scientist and student of Friedrich Ratzel. He first coined the term "geopolitics." His writings would play a decisive role in influencing General Karl Haushofer's geopolitik, and indirectly the future Nazi foreign policy.

His writings focused on five central concepts that would underlie German geopolitik:

1. Reich was a territorial concept that was composed of Raum (Lebensraum), and strategic military shape;
2. Volk was a racial conception of the state;
3. Haushalt was a call for autarky based on land, formulated in reaction to the vicissitudes of international markets;
4. Gesellschaft was the social aspect of a nation's organization and cultural appeal, Kjellén anthropomorphizing inter-state relations more than Ratzel had; and,
5. Regierung was the form of government whose bureaucracy and army would contribute to the people's pacification and coordination.

=== General Karl Haushofer ===
Karl Haushofer's geopolitik expanded upon that of Ratzel and Kjellén. While the latter two conceived of geopolitik as the state-as-an-organism-in-space put to the service of a leader, Haushofer's Munich school specifically studied geography as it related to war and designs for empire. The behavioral rules of previous geopoliticians were thus turned into dynamic normative doctrines for action on lebensraum and world power.

Haushofer defined geopolitik in 1935 as "the duty to safeguard the right to the soil, to the land in the widest sense, not only the land within the frontiers of the Reich, but the right to the more extensive Volk and cultural lands." Culture itself was seen as the most conducive element to dynamic expansion. Culture provided a guide as to the best areas for expansion, and could make expansion safe, whereas solely military or commercial power could not.

To Haushofer, the existence of a state depended on living space, the pursuit of which must serve as the basis for all policies. Germany had a high population density, whereas the old colonial powers had a much lower density: a virtual mandate for German expansion into resource-rich areas. A buffer zone of territories or insignificant states on one's borders would serve to protect Germany.

Closely linked to this need was Haushofer's assertion that the existence of small states was evidence of political regression and disorder in the international system. The small states surrounding Germany ought to be brought into the vital German order. These states were seen as being too small to maintain practical autonomy (even if they maintained large colonial possessions) and would be better served by protection and organization within Germany. In Europe, he saw Belgium, the Netherlands, Portugal, Denmark, Switzerland, Greece and the "mutilated alliance" of Austro-Hungary as supporting his assertion.

Haushofer and the Munich school of geopolitik would eventually expand their conception of lebensraum and autarky well past a restoration of the German borders of 1914 and "a place in the sun." They set as goals a New European Order, then a New Afro-European Order, and eventually to a Eurasian Order. This concept became known as a pan-region, taken from the American Monroe Doctrine, and the idea of national and continental self-sufficiency. This was a forward-looking refashioning of the drive for colonies, something that geopoliticians did not see as an economic necessity, but more as a matter of prestige, and of putting pressure on older colonial powers. The fundamental motivating force was not economic, but cultural and spiritual.

Beyond being an economic concept, pan-regions were a strategic concept as well. Haushofer acknowledged the strategic concept of the Heartland put forward by the Halford Mackinder. If Germany could control Eastern Europe and subsequently Russian territory, it could control a strategic area to which hostile sea power could be denied. Allying with Italy and Japan would further augment German strategic control of Eurasia, with those states becoming the naval arms protecting Germany's insular position.

=== Nicholas J. Spykman ===
Nicholas J. Spykman was a Dutch-American geostrategist, known as the "godfather of containment." His geostrategic work, The Geography of the Peace (1944), argued that the balance of power in Eurasia directly affected United States security.

N.J. Spykman based his geostrategic ideas on those of Sir Halford Mackinder's Heartland theory. Spykman's key contribution was to alter the strategic valuation of the Heartland vs. the "Rimland" (a geographic area analogous to Mackinder's "Inner or Marginal Crescent"). Spykman does not see the heartland as a region which will be unified by powerful transport or communication infrastructure in the near future. As such, it won't be in a position to compete with the United States' sea power, despite its uniquely defensive position. The rimland possessed all of the key resources and populations—its domination was key to the control of Eurasia. His strategy was for Offshore powers, and perhaps Russia as well, to resist the consolidation of control over the rimland by any one power. Balanced power would lead to peace.

=== George F. Kennan ===
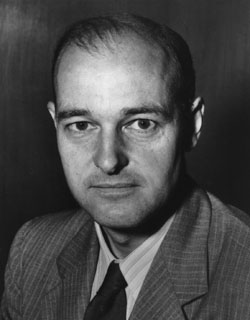
George F. Kennan

George F. Kennan, U.S. ambassador to the Soviet Union, laid out the seminal Cold War geostrategy in his Long Telegram and The Sources of Soviet Conduct. He coined the term "containment", which would become the guiding idea for U.S. grand strategy over the next forty years, although the term would come to mean something significantly different from Kennan's original formulation.

Kennan advocated what was called "strongpoint containment." In his view, the United States and its allies needed to protect the productive industrial areas of the world from Soviet domination. He noted that of the five centers of industrial strength in the world—the United States, Britain, Japan, Germany, and Russia—the only contested area was that of Germany. Kennan was concerned about maintaining the balance of power between the U.S. and the USSR, and in his view, only these few industrialized areas mattered.

Here Kennan differed from Paul Nitze, whose seminal Cold War document, NSC 68, called for "undifferentiated or global containment," along with a massive military buildup. Kennan saw the Soviet Union as an ideological and political challenger rather than a true military threat. There was no reason to fight the Soviets throughout Eurasia, because those regions were not productive, and the Soviet Union was already exhausted from World War II, limiting its ability to project power abroad. Therefore, Kennan disapproved of U.S. involvement in Vietnam, and later spoke out critically against Reagan's military buildup.

=== Henry Kissinger ===
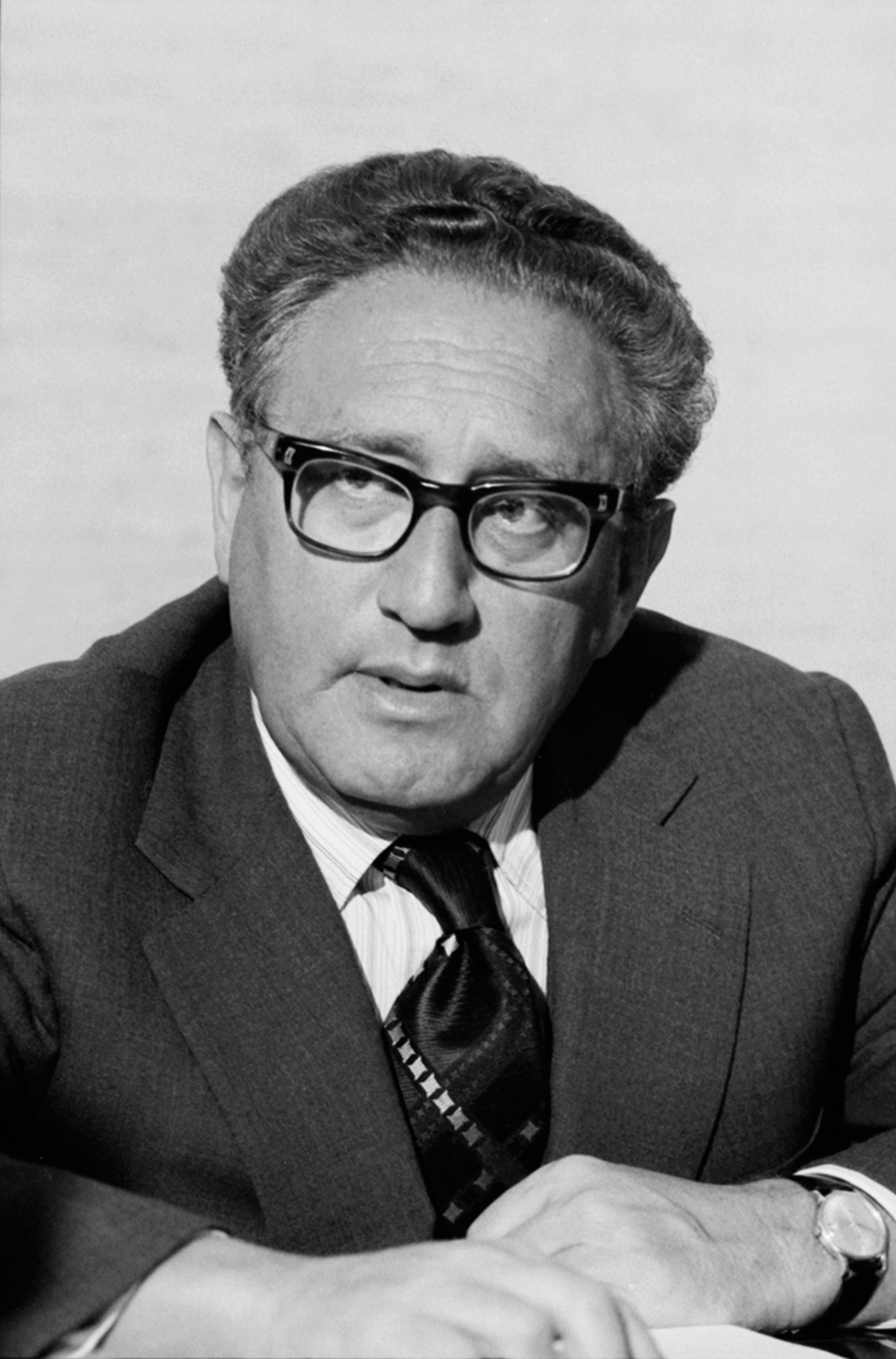
Henry Kissinger.

Henry Kissinger implemented two geostrategic objectives when in office: the deliberate move to shift the polarity of the international system from bipolar to tripolar; and, the designation of regional stabilizing states in connection with the Nixon Doctrine. In Chapter 28 of his long work, Diplomacy, Kissinger discusses the "opening of China" as a deliberate strategy to change the balance of power in the international system, taking advantage of the split within the Sino-Soviet bloc. The regional stabilizers were pro-American states which would receive significant U.S. aid in exchange for assuming responsibility for regional stability. Among the regional stabilizers designated by Kissinger were Zaire, Iran, and Indonesia.

=== Zbigniew Brzezinski ===
Zbigniew Brzezinski laid out his most significant contribution to post-Cold War geostrategy in his 1997 book The Grand Chessboard. He defined four regions of Eurasia, and in which ways the United States ought to design its policy toward each region in order to maintain its global primacy. The four regions (echoing Mackinder and Spykman) are:

- Europe, the Democratic Bridgehead
- Russia, the Black Hole
- The Middle East, the Eurasian Balkans
- Asia, the Far Eastern Anchor

In his subsequent book, The Choice, Brzezinski updates his geostrategy in light of globalization, 9/11 and the intervening six years between the two books.

In his journal called America's New Geostrategy, he discusses the need of shift in America's geostrategy to avoid its massive collapse like many scholars predict. He points out that:

- the United States needs to shift away from its long-standing preoccupation with the threat of a nuclear war between the superpowers or a massive Soviet conventional attack in central Europe.
- a doctrine and a force posture are needed that will enable the United States to respond more selectively to a large number of possible security threats to enhance deterrence in the current and foreseeable conditions.
- the United States should rely to a greater extent on a more flexible mix of nuclear and even non-nuclear strategic forces capable of executing more selective military mission

== Other notable geostrategists ==
Name	Nationality
Brooks Adams	United States
Thomas P. M. Barnett	United States
Saul B. Cohen	United States
George Friedman	United States
Julian Corbett	British
Colin S. Gray	United States
Homer Lea	United States
Otto Maull	German
Alexander de Seversky	United States
Robert Strausz-Hupé	United States
Ko Tun-hwa	Republic of China (Taiwan)
Shahryar Khan Niazi	Pakistan

== See also ==
- German geostrategy
- Indian geostrategy
- Pakistani geostrategy
- Geostrategy in Taiwan
- Geostrategy in Central Asia
- Geoeconomics
