= The Geographical Pivot of History =

1904 article by Halford John Mackinder

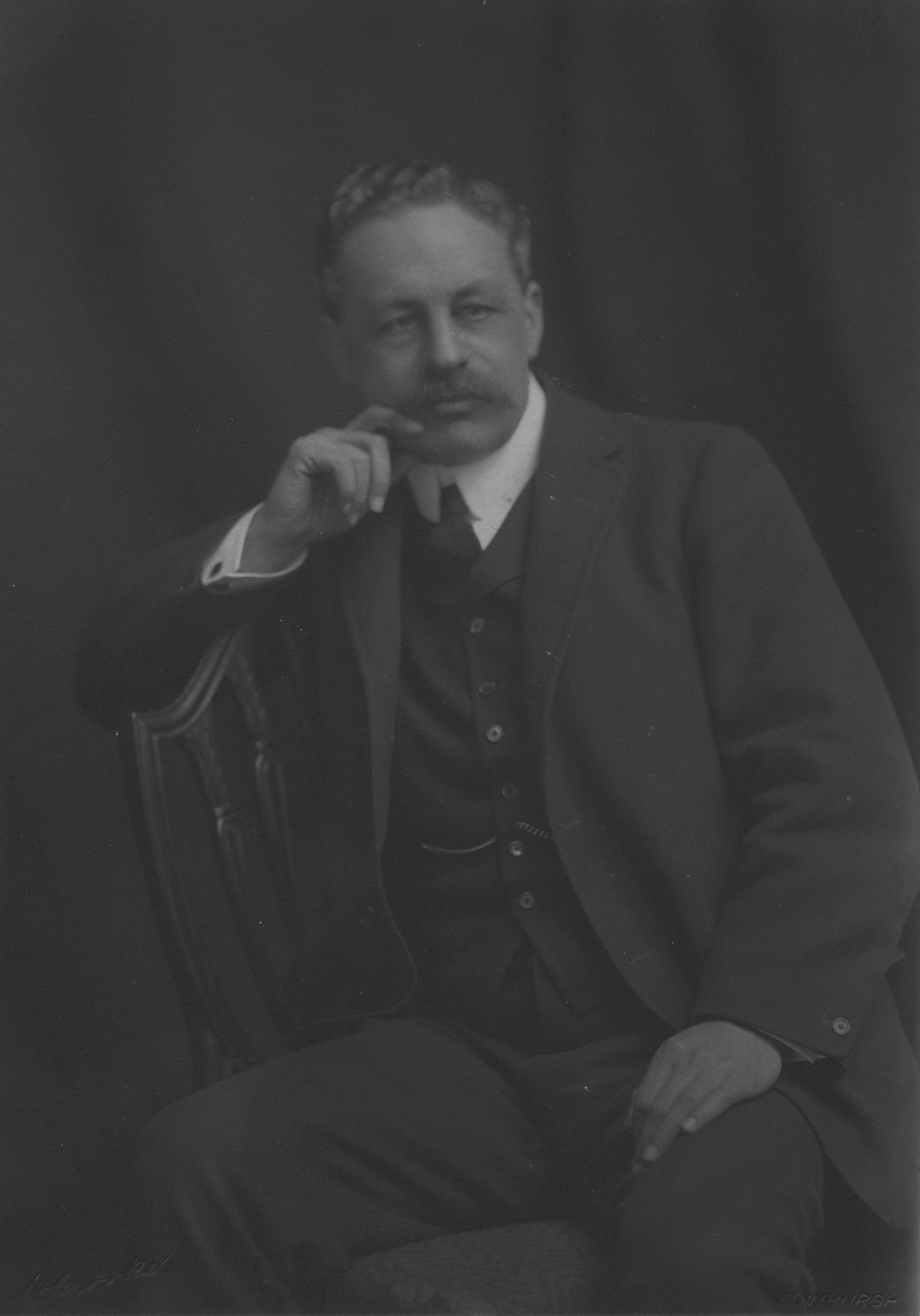
- Halford John Mackinder, the author
- Author: Halford John Mackinder
- Language: English
- Publication date: 1904
- Publication place: United Kingdom
- Media type: Paper

"The Geographical Pivot of History" is an article submitted by Halford John Mackinder in 1904 to the Royal Geographical Society that advances his heartland theory. In this article, Mackinder extended the scope of geopolitical analysis to encompass the entire globe. He defined Afro-Eurasia as the "world island" and its "heartland" as the area east of the Volga, south of the Arctic, west of the Yangtze, and north of the Himalayas. Due to its strategic location and natural resources, Mackinder argued that whoever controlled the "heartland" could control the world.

== The World Island ==
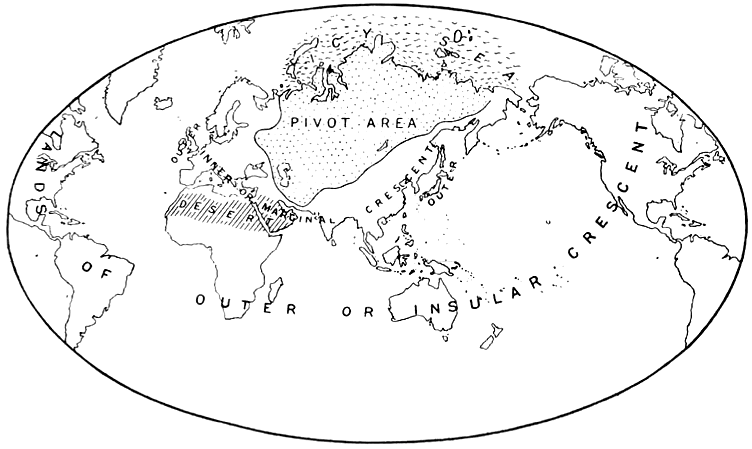
Map of the world, with regions labeled by Mackinder, published with his 1904 article "The Geographical Pivot of History"

According to Mackinder, Earth's land surface was divisible into:

- The World Island, comprising the interlinked continents of Africa, Asia, and Europe (Afro-Eurasia). This was the largest, most populous, and richest of all possible land combinations.
- The Offshore Islands, including the British Isles, Hainan, the Japanese archipelago, Madagascar, the Malay Archipelago, Sri Lanka, and Formosa.
- The Outlying Islands, including the interlinked continents of North America and South America (the Americas), as well as Oceania.

=== The Heartland ===
The Heartland lies at the centre of the World Island, stretching from the Volga to the Yangtze and from the Arctic to the Himalayas. Mackinder's Heartland was the area then ruled by the Russian Empire and after that by the Soviet Union, minus the Kamchatka Peninsula region, which is located in the easternmost part of Russia, near the Aleutian Islands and the Kuril Islands.

== Strategic importance of Eastern Europe ==
Later, in 1919, Mackinder summarised his theory thus:

Who rules East Europe commands the Heartland;
who rules the Heartland commands the World-Island;
who rules the World-Island commands the world.

— Mackinder, Democratic Ideals and Reality, p. 106

Any power which controlled the World-Island would control well over 50% of the world's resources. The Heartland's size and central position made it the key to controlling the World-Island.

The vital question was how to secure control for the Heartland. This question may seem pointless, since in 1904 the Russian Empire had ruled most of the area from the Volga to Eastern Siberia for centuries. But throughout the nineteenth century:

- The West European powers had combined, usually successfully, in the Great Game to prevent Russian expansion.
- The Russian Empire was huge but socially, politically and technologically backward – i.e. inferior in "virility, equipment and organization".

Mackinder held that effective political domination of the Heartland by a single power had been unattainable in the past because:

- The Heartland was protected from sea power by ice to the north and mountains and deserts to the south.
- Previous land invasions from east to west and vice versa were unsuccessful because lack of efficient transportation made it impossible to assure a continual stream of men and supplies.

He outlined the following ways in which the Heartland might become a springboard for global domination in the twentieth century (Sempa, 2000):

- Successful invasion of Russia by a Western European nation (most probably Germany). Mackinder believed that the introduction of the railroad had removed the Heartland's invulnerability to land invasion. As Eurasia began to be covered by an extensive network of railroads, there was an excellent chance that a powerful continental nation could extend its political control over the Eastern European gateway to the Eurasian landmass. In Mackinder's words, "Who rules East Europe commands the Heartland."
- A Russo-German alliance. Before 1917 both countries were ruled by autocrats (the Emperor of all the Russias (Tsar) and the Kaiser), and both could have been attracted to an alliance against Western Europe. Germany would have contributed to such an alliance its formidable army and its large and growing sea power.
- Conquest of Russia by a Sino-Japanese empire (see below).

The combined empires' large East Asian coastline would also provide the potential for it to become a major sea power. Mackinder's "Who rules East Europe commands the Heartland" does not cover this scenario, probably because the previous two scenarios were seen as the major risks of the nineteenth century and the early 1900s.

One of Mackinder's personal objectives was to warn Britain that its traditional reliance on sea power would become a weakness as improved land transport opened up the Heartland for invasion and/or industrialisation (Sempa, 2000).

A more modern development that may suggest that the Heartland theory still has some substance is the growth of Russia's oil exports through pipelines. Heartland theory implies that the world island is full of resources to be exploited.

== Influence on other geopolitical models ==
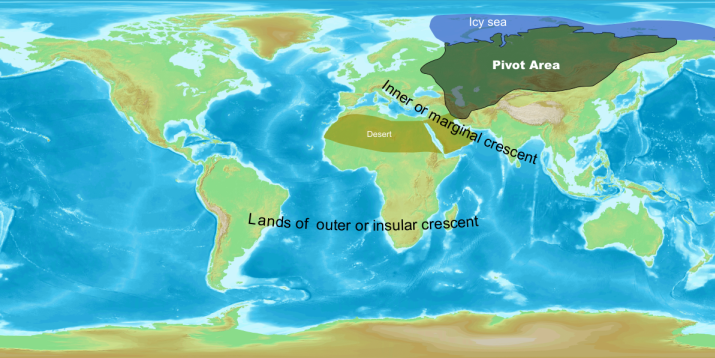
Colour representation, using a modern projection of the world

Signs of Mackinder's Heartland Theory can be found in "Crush zone" of James Fairgrieve, Rimland of Nicholas Spykman, "Shatterbelt" of Saul Cohen and the Intermediate Region of Dimitri Kitsikis. There is a significant geographical overlap between the "Inner Crescent" of Mackinder, Crush zone, Rimland and Shatterbelt, as well as between the Heartland or "Pivot Area" and the Intermediate Region.

Kitsikis excludes Germany-Prussia and north-eastern China from the Intermediate Region. Mackinder, on the other hand, excludes North Africa, Eastern Europe and the Middle East from the Heartland. The reason for this difference is that Mackinder's model is primarily geo-strategic, while Kitsikis' model is geo-civilizational. However, the roles of both the Intermediate Region and the Heartland are regarded by their respective authors as being pivotal in the shaping of world history.

Max Ostrovsky discredited the existence of any permanent geographic pivot of history because climate is impermanent but his ultimate model echoes Mackinder: Who rules the largest temperate zone with the most optimum rainfall, rules the world.

President Barack Obama initiated "Pivot to Asia" meaning US strategic, diplomatic and economic focus on the region. Mackinder's term became a popular buzzword after Obama's Secretary of State Hillary Clinton authored "America's Pacific Century," in Foreign Policy. Former Chinese State Councilor, Dai Bingguo, suggested to Hillary Clinton: "Why don't you 'pivot out of here?'"

== Criticism ==
K. S. Gadzhev, in his book Introduction to Geopolitics (Введение в геополитику, Vvedenie v geopolitiku), raises a series of objections to Mackinder's Heartland; to start with that the significance physiography is given there for political strategy is a form of geographical determinism.

Critics of the theory also argue that in modern day practice, the theory is outdated due to the evolution of technological warfare, as at the time of publication, Mackinder only considered land and sea powers. In modern day time there are possibilities of attacking a rival without the need for a direct invasion via aircraft, long-range missiles, or even cyber attacks.

According to Matt Rosenberg, Mackinder's theory was never fully proven as no singular power in history has had control of all three of the regions at the same time. The closest this ever occurred was during the Crimean War (1853–1856) whereby Russia attempted to fight for control over crumbling parts of the Ottoman Empire, ultimately losing to the French and the British.

A. F. K. Organski was more focused in his criticism. Those who have ruled East Europe, he wrote, have not commanded the world. "Extremists like Mackinder have gone too far."

== See also ==
- Intermediate Region
- The Grand Chessboard
- Intermarium
- Land hemisphere
- Rimland
- Eurasianism
