= East =

One of the four cardinal directions

A 16-point compass rose with east highlighted to the right

East is one of the four cardinal directions or points of the compass. It is the opposite direction from west and is the direction from which the Sun rises on the Earth.

== Etymology ==
As in other languages, the word is formed from the fact that east is the direction where the Sun rises: east comes from Middle English est, from Old English ēast, which itself comes from the Proto-Germanic *aus-to- or *austra- "east, toward the sunrise", from Proto-Indo-European *aus- "to shine," or "dawn", cognate with Old High German *ōstar "to the east", Latin aurora 'dawn', and Greek ἠώς ēōs 'dawn, east'. Examples of the same formation in other languages include Latin oriens 'east, sunrise' from orior 'to rise, to originate', Greek ανατολή anatolé 'east' from ἀνατέλλω 'to rise' and Hebrew מִזְרָח mariza 'east' from זָרַח zaraḥ 'to rise, to shine'. Ēostre, a Germanic goddess of dawn, might have been a personification of both dawn and the cardinal points. In the Middle Ages, East was referred to as the Orient, or abbreviated on compasses and maps as O.

East is sometimes abbreviated as E.

== Navigation ==
By convention, the right-hand side of a map is east. This convention has developed from the use of a compass, which places north at the top. However, on maps of planets such as Venus and Uranus which rotate retrograde, the left hand side is east.

To go east using a compass for navigation, one sets a bearing or azimuth of 90°.

== Cultural ==
East is the direction toward which the Earth rotates about its axis, and therefore the general direction from which the Sun appears to rise. The practice of praying towards the East is older than Christianity, but has been adopted by this religion as the Orient was thought of as containing mankind's original home. Hence, Christian churches have been traditionally oriented towards the east. After some early exceptions, this tradition of having the altar on the liturgical east has become a part of the church orientation concept liturgical east and west.

The Orient is the East, traditionally comprising anything that belongs to the Eastern world, in relation to Europe. In English, it is largely a metonym for, and referring to the same area as, the continent of Asia, divided into the Far East, Middle East, and Near East. Despite this Eurocentric origin, these regions are still located to the east of the Geographical centre of Earth.

One study has suggested that within an individual Northern Hemisphere city, the east end is typically poorer because the prevailing winds blow from the west.

== See also ==
- Intermediate Region
- Easting
- Oriental
