= Green Left (newspaper) =

Australian socialist newspaper

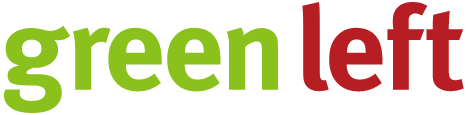
- Type: Alternative weekly
- Format: Compact
- Owner: Independent
- Publisher: Green Left Association
- Founded: 1990; 36 years ago
- Political alignment: Socialist: Eco-socialist; Anti-capitalist
- Language: English
- Headquarters: 22 Mountain Street; Ultimo, Sydney
- Website: greenleft.org.au

Green Left, previously known as Green Left Weekly, is an Australian socialist newspaper, written by activists to, according to itself, "present the views excluded by the big business media". The newspaper was founded in 1990. Green Left is the de facto newspaper of the Socialist Alliance.

== Overview ==
The newspaper is a notionally independent Australian source of local, national and international news, and provides left-wing analysis and debate. In an editorial in the first issue, Green Left Weekly stated:

This is a paper by and for the green and progressive movement. We would like it to reflect the movement in action and in discussion. We want to reflect the controversies and the concerns as well as the achievements and celebrations.

In 2023, the paper stated:

Green Left's aim is to both help build movements of resistance as well as an anti-capitalist political alternative.

Although the newspaper was initiated by the Democratic Socialist Perspective, the newspaper has been supported by a variety of groups throughout its history. In the early 1990s, Australian Democrats senators Sid Spindler and Janet Powell supported and sponsored the newspaper.

Subjects of particular importance to Green Left include anti-capitalism, workers rights, refugees, women's rights, global warming, environmental destruction, Australian Aboriginal land rights, and foreign policy, especially Australia's military intervention in the Asia-Pacific region, the US-led invasions of Afghanistan and Iraq, and other forms of US political intervention overseas.

In 2011, Victorian Consumer Affairs Minister Michael O'Brien asked the Australian Competition & Consumer Commission (ACCC) to investigate whether a number of groups, including Green Left Weekly, had breached secondary boycott laws by supporting the Boycott, Divestment and Sanctions movement pickets at the premises of the Max Brenner chain of chocolate shops. The ACCC determined that the protests were not a secondary boycott.

The newspaper strongly supports the socialist policy of Bolivia and Ecuador and the Bolivarian Revolution in Venezuela led by Hugo Chávez, and in the past opened a bureau in Caracas to improve its coverage of events there. At the time, it claimed to be the only Australian newspaper with a bureau in Latin America.

It is also the only Australian newspaper to regularly print articles by left-wing journalist John Pilger. Pilger has said of Green Left Weekly: "There are few other newspapers — radical or any other kind — that draw together news and analysis that is as well informed, credible, and non-sectarian as Green Left Weekly. Its work has influenced mine and has been a beacon to those who believe the press ought to be an agent of the people."

Since 2008, Green Left has published a monthly Arabic language supplement, The Flame, edited by Socialist Alliance members of the growing Sudanese Australian community. In 2009, Green Left Weekly launched a new Spanish language supplement, Foro Social Latinamericano, edited by the Latin America Social Forum in Sydney, a collaboration between left-wing members and groups in the Latin American community in Australia.

In 2009, The Australian accused Green Left Weekly of supporting terrorism for its criticism of Israel.

In 2024 the Green Left facebook page was banned twice by social media corporation Meta. The second ban is to be for ten years and reasoning is due to the page publishing content of Leila Khalid, leader of the Palestinian Liberation Front.

== Awards ==
In June 2005 Green Left weekly won an award from web-surveying company Hitwise. Hitwise ranked the website as the most popular Australian-based political site. Green Left Weekly received a similar award in 2006, and in the period between June and December 2009, Green Left weekly once again ranked in the top ten, achieving 7th position.

== See also ==
- Eco-socialism
- List of newspapers in Australia
