= Old World =

Landmass corresponding to Afro–Eurasia

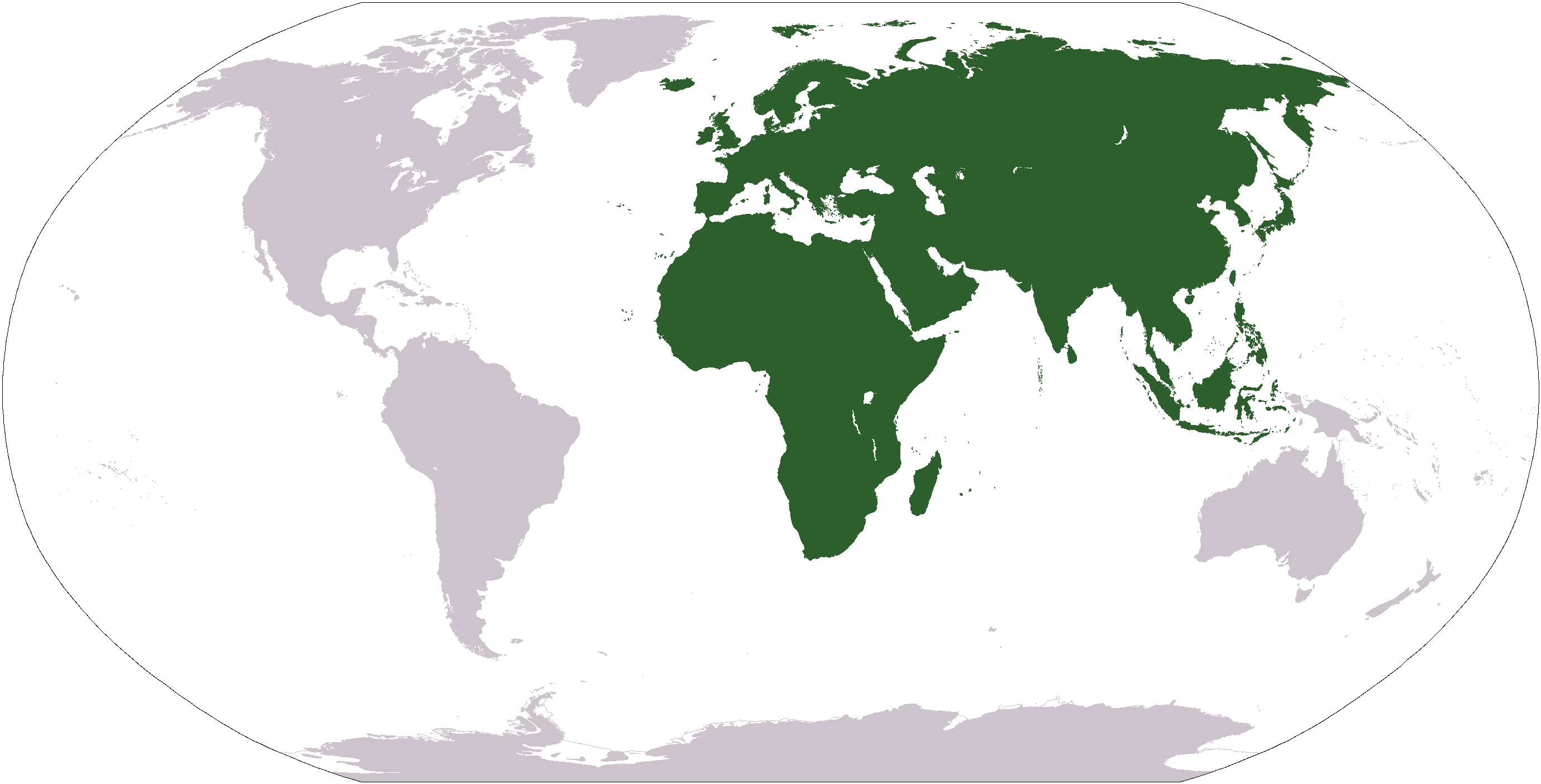
Old World

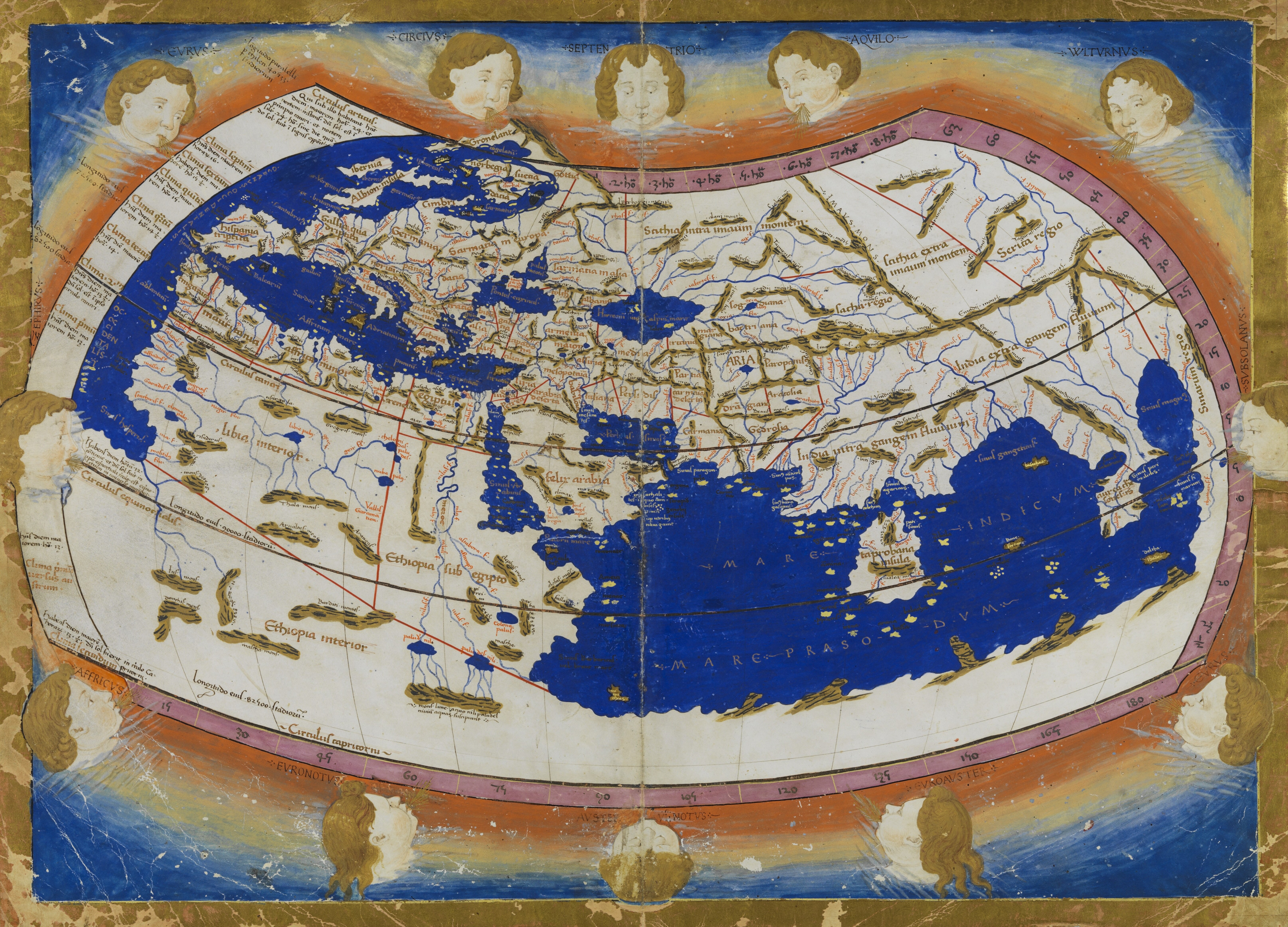
Map of the "Old World" (the 2nd-century Ptolemy world map in a 15th-century copy)

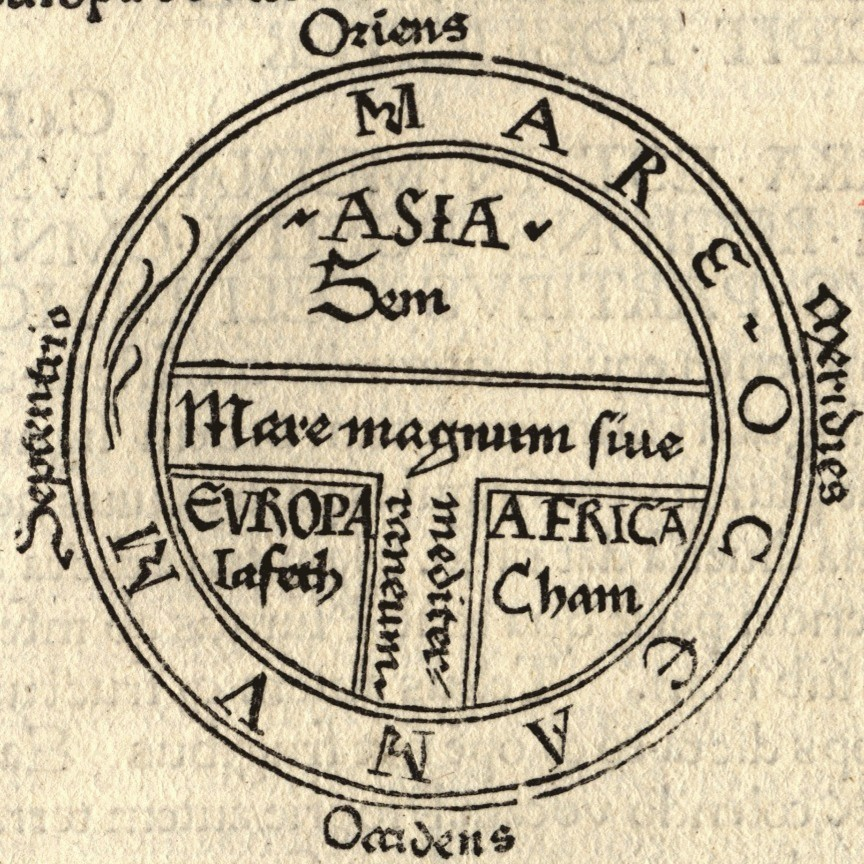
This T and O map, from the first printed version of Isidore's Etymologiae (Augsburg, 1472), identifies the three known continents (Asia, Europe and Africa) as respectively populated by descendants of Sem (Shem), Iafeth (Japheth) and Cham (Ham).

The "Old World" (Latin: Mundus vetustus) is a term for Afro-Eurasia coined by Europeans after 1493, when they became aware of the existence of the Americas, Oceania, and Antarctica. It is used to contrast the continents of Africa, Europe, and Asia in the Eastern Hemisphere, previously thought of by the Europeans as the entire world, with the "New World", the newly encountered lands of the Western Hemisphere, particularly the Americas.

== History ==
In the context of archaeology and world history, the term "Old World" includes those parts of the world which were in (indirect) cultural contact from the Bronze Age onward, resulting in the parallel development of the early civilizations, mostly in the temperate zone between roughly the 45th and 25th parallels north, in the area of the Mediterranean, including North Africa. It also included Mesopotamia, the Persian plateau, the Indian subcontinent, China, and parts of sub-Saharan Africa.

These regions were connected via the Silk Road trade route, and they had a pronounced Iron Age period following the Bronze Age. In cultural terms, the Iron Age was accompanied by the so-called Axial Age, referring to cultural, philosophical and religious developments eventually leading to the emergence of the historical Western (Hellenism, "classical"), Near Eastern (Zoroastrian and Abrahamic), and Far Eastern (Hinduism, Buddhism, Jainism, Sikhism, Confucianism, Taoism) cultural spheres.

== Other names ==
The mainland of Afro-Eurasia (excluding islands or island groups such as the British Isles, Japan, Sri Lanka, Madagascar, and the Malay Archipelago) has been referred to as the World Island. The term may have been coined by Sir Halford John Mackinder in The Geographical Pivot of History.
