= Ko Tun-hwa =

Vice Admiral Ko Tun-hwa (Chinese: 葛敦華; pinyin: Gé Dūnhuá; 18 September 1921; Fuzhou – 12 June 2010, Taipei) was a Taiwanese geostrategist, former Vice Minister of Defense of Taiwan and former National Policy Advisor to the President of the Taiwan. Admiral Ko Tun-hwa graduated in 1957 with the first class of the Naval Command Course, the first course for international officers, at the United States Naval War College.

== Awards ==
- Vice Admiral Ko Tun-hwa was awarded the Silver Star Award from by the International Strategic Studies Association for Outstanding Contributions to Strategic Progress.
- Vice Admiral Ko Tun-hwawas was awarded the Stefan T. Possony Prize.
