= Rimland =

Concept in geopolitics

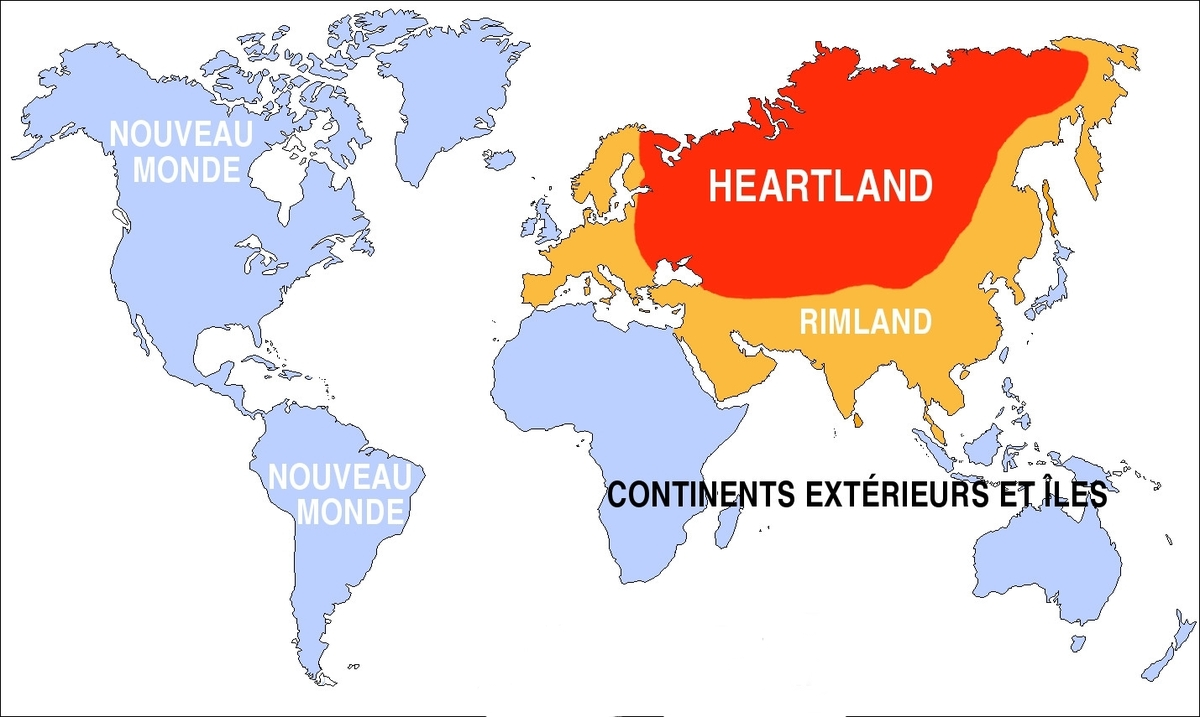
Map of world with Rimland and Heartland's theories

The Rimland is a concept championed in the early 20th century by Nicholas John Spykman, professor of international relations at Yale University. To him, geopolitics is the planning of the security policy of a country in terms of its geographical factors. He described the maritime fringe of a country or continent; in particular the densely populated western, southern, and eastern edges of the Eurasian continent.

He criticized Mackinder for overrating the Heartland as being of immense strategic importance due to its vast size, central geographical location, and supremacy of land power rather than sea power. He assumed that the Heartland will not be a potential hub of Europe, because:

1. Western Russia was then an agrarian society
2. Bases of industrialization were found to the west of the Ural mountains.
3. This area is ringed to the north, east, south, and south-west by some of the greater obstacles to transportation (ice and freezing temperature, towering mountains etc.).
4. There has never really been a simple land power–sea power opposition.

Spykman thought that the Rimland, the strip of coastal land that encircles Eurasia, is more important than the Central Asian zone (the so-called Heartland) for the control of the Eurasian continent. Spykman's vision is at the base of the "containment politics" put into effect by the United States in its relation/position to the Soviet Union during the Cold War.

Thus, the Heartland appeared to him to be less important in comparison to the Rimland.

== Concept ==
According to Spykman, "Who controls the Rimland rules Eurasia, who rules Eurasia controls the destinies of the world."

The Rimland, Halford Mackinder's "Inner or Marginal Crescent", was divided into three sections:

- The European coastland;
- The Arabian-Middle Eastern desert land; and,
- The Asiatic monsoon land.

These regions contain most of the world's people as well as a large share of the world's resources. The Rimland is located along the continental coastline, making it more important than the Heartland. It included Asia Minor, Arabia, Iran, Afghanistan, Southeast Asia, China, Korea, and the east coast of Siberia.

All of these regions make up a buffer zone between sea powers and land powers.

While Spykman accepts the first two as defined, he rejects the simple grouping of the Asian countries into one "monsoon land." India, the Indian Ocean littoral, and Indian culture were geographically and civilizationally separate from the Chinese lands.

The Rimland's defining characteristic is that it is an intermediate region, lying between the heartland and the marginal sea powers. As the amphibious buffer zone between the land powers and sea powers, it must defend itself from both sides, and therein lies its fundamental security problems. Spykman's conception of the Rimland bears greater resemblance to Alfred Thayer Mahan's "debated and debatable zone" than to Mackinder's inner or marginal crescent.

The Rimland has great importance coming from its demographic weight, natural resources, and industrial development. Spykman sees this importance as the reason that the Rimland will be crucial to containing the Heartland (whereas Mackinder had believed that the Outer or Insular Crescent would be the most important factor in the Heartland's containment).

== Applicability and variations ==
Spykman called for the consolidation of the Rimland countries to ensure their survival during World War II. With the defeat of Germany and the emergence of the USSR, Spykman's views were embraced during the formulation of the American Cold War policy of containing communist influence.

But as the states within the Rimland had varying degree of independence, and a variety of races, and culture, it did not come under the control of any single power.

Dr. Spyros Katsoulas introduced the concept of the Rimland Bridge to describe the hinge between Europe and Asia, where Greece, Cyprus, and Turkey are located. The purpose of the new term is not to contradict, but rather to supplement Spykman's theory, and highlight the special strategic significance of the Eastern Mediterranean, as well as its inherent instability.

The Rimland Bridge is defined as the buffer and transit zone that connects the European and Asian parts of Rimland and has three major characteristics. It simultaneously acts as a strategic chokepoint and a valuable gateway, but also as a dangerous shatter belt due to the enduring Greek–Turkish rivalry.

== Criticism ==
- It was a self-fulfilling prophecy.
- In his concept of air power he did not include the use of modern missiles with nuclear warheads.
- The Rimland is not a region but a unit, otherwise the epitome of geographical diversity.
- The Rimland theory is biased against Asian countries.
- The Rimland theory does not take into account the various conflicts going on between its different countries (India vs. Pakistan, etc.)

== See also ==
- The Geographical Pivot of History (Theory of Heartland)
- Core–periphery
- Intermediate Region
- Island chain strategy
- Shatter belt (geopolitics)
