= Strategic geography =

Branch of geography

Strategic geography is concerned with the control of, or access to, spatial areas that affect the security and prosperity of nations. Spatial areas that concern strategic geography change with human needs and development. This field is a subset of human geography, itself a subset of the more general study of geography. It is also related to geostrategy.

Strategic geography is that branch of science, which deals with the study of spatial areas that affect the security and prosperity of a nation.

== See also ==
- Geostrategy
- Strategic depth
