= E. C. Spykman =

American writer

- Born: Elizabeth Choate; July 17, 1896; Southborough, Massachusetts
- Died: August 7, 1965 (aged 69)
- Education: Westover School
- Occupation: Children's writer
- Spouse: Nicholas J. Spykman (m. 1931; died 1943)
- Children: 2 daughters

Elizabeth Choate Spykman (née Elizabeth Choate, July 17, 1896 – August 7, 1965) was an American author known primarily for her children's books.

Choate married geostrategist and founder of the department of international studies at Yale University Nicholas J. Spykman (pronounced "Spike-man") in her mid-thirties, and had two daughters. In 1955, at the age of 59, she published her first children's book, A Lemon and a Star. Her second, The Wild Angel, was published in 1957. Terrible, Horrible Edie was published in 1960, and her final children's book, Edie on the Warpath, was published posthumously in 1966.

These four books are about the Cares children growing up in Summerton, Massachusetts, in the 1910s. They are widely believed to be autobiographical fiction. Virginia Haviland, writing in The Horn Book, said of A Lemon and a Star, "A remarkable evocation of turn-of-the-century growing-up in a story with a strong feeling of particular family reminiscence and at the same time of universal childhood . . . Unusually well written."

Spykman also wrote a history of the Westover School in 1959. In this, she wrote of the Westover School architecture, "the building was intentionally kept free from luxury as unsuited to school life and out of harmony with the atmosphere of the village, and the quiet refinement which goes with straightforward simplicity."

== Early life ==
Elizabeth Choate Spykman was born on July 17, 1896, in Southborough, Massachusetts, the fourth of six children. Her father, Charles Francis Choate, Jr. was a prominent lawyer for leading Boston financial, communications, and railroad companies, as well as a regent for the Smithsonian Institution, with American roots stretching back to 1643. Amongst Spykman's prominent paternal ancestors are Rufus Choate, Helen Choate Bell, and uncles Joseph Hodges Choate and William Gardner Choate. Her grandfather, Charles Francis Choate, Sr. was the lawyer and later director of a railroad company, as well as leader of various Boston financial institutions.

Spykman's mother, Louise Burnett, was the 11th of 12 siblings, born in Southborough, Massachusetts, to Joseph Burnett (educator) and Josephine Cutter.

Spkyman's childhood home was on the western side of Southborough, an area largely occupied by the homes and properties of various Burnett relatives, with nearby reservoirs built in the 1890's to supply Boston with water, and was much like the setting of her novels.
