= Australia's security relationship with the South Pacific =

Security in the South Pacific has proved to be one of the most enduring of Australia's security concerns. It was the subject of Australia's first substantial strategic policy initiative, when in 1888 Alfred Deakin took his concerns about French intrusion into Vanuatu to London (Wainwright 2003: 13). Since then, the South Pacific has played an important role in Australian security thinking. Notably during the Second World War in the Pacific and through Australia's responsibilities as a colonial power in Papua New Guinea until that country's independence in 1975. Australia was regarded as having been quite detached from the Pacific Islands during the post colonial period (Wainwright & White 2004: 10). However this period, until the beginning of the 21st century, was marked by numerous small scale Australian Defence Force (ADF) operations in the region. The notable cases were in Vanuatu in 1980 and 1988 as well Fiji in 1987 (Breen 2008: 44–45). The ADF also played an important role in peacekeeping missions in Bougainville during this period.

== Strategic outlook ==
Australia has always placed an important emphasis on security in the South Pacific because of the concern that Australia's security could be undermined by anarchy in these states, or by them falling under the control of potentially hostile governments (Wainwright & White 2004: 14). Currently these perceptions translate into ongoing defence, security, economic, aid, environmental and humanitarian activities (Firth 2008: 1).

=== Defence White Papers 2000 and 2009 ===
The security of Australia's immediate neighbourhood which it shares with Indonesia, New Zealand, Papua New Guinea, East Timor and the island countries of the South Pacific has ubiquitously been listed as the second most important defence priority behind the ability to defend Australia from a direct military attack (Australian Government Department of Defence 2000 & 2009). The White Papers emphasise that unstable neighbours could lead to a strategic environment that might be inimical to Australia's interests (Australian Government Department of Defence 2000 & 2009).

=== Expectations of Australia ===
Australia considers itself as having significant responsibilities as a leader and regional power to ensure a stable and secure South Pacific (Australian Government Department of Defence 2000: 43–44). Australia is also expected by its global partners to be a regional leader and is judged by how well it fulfils this role (Firth 2008: 1; Australian Government Department of Foreign Affairs and Trade 1997: 65). In this role as a regional leader, Australia has assumed a role as the de facto security guarantor across the Melanesian Arc (Dobell 2011: 1 & 6). In addition, Australia realises that while the problems in its neighbourhood may not be 'world shaping problems', however, if it does not take the lead in addressing regional issues someone else might and this would be detrimental to Australia's ability to influence the region (Lyon 2008: 2).

=== The Arc of Instability ===
The term ‘Arc of Instability’ is commonly used to refer to the region to Australia's immediate North and East and it is a term that has appeared in numerous Australian Government reports (Rumley 2006: 17). Australian Government fears were that the failing states in the South Pacific, unable to uphold the rule of law or control their borders, could make Australia more vulnerable to transnational criminal operations and perhaps terrorism (Wainwright 2003: 13–14). In 2003, the then Australian Foreign Minister, Alexander Downer, directly alluded to the possibility of the unstable situation in Solomon Islands posing 'insidious and direct threats to Australia' and spoke about the possibility of intervention (Downer 2003). There was also concern that events in one part of the 'Arc of Instability' could be contagious for regional neighbours (Wainwright & White 2004: 14). The importance that Australia places on a secure immediate neighbourhood, is demonstrated by the inclusion in this strategy of the protection of Timor Leste, political stability in Melanesia (including maintenance of the Regional Assistance Mission to Solomon Islands (RAMSI)) and close defence ties with Papua New Guinea (Bergin & Herr 2011: 32). Australia is cognizant that 'non-conventional' security threats pose problems not only to the islands but the threat that they pose a threat to 'Australia through the region' (Bergin & Herr 2011: 32). While transnational, 'non-conventional' security threats are the main security concern for Australia pertaining to the South Pacific, Australian defence and security strategists have considered the possibility of weak states in the South Pacific becoming bases from which hostile powers could launch conventional military attacks on Australia (Lyon 2007: 9; Wainwright 2003: 15).

== Regional intervention ==
=== Regional Assistance Mission Solomon Islands (RAMSI) ===
A June 2000 coup in the Solomon Islands led to the formation of an Australian led International Peace Monitoring Team (IPMT) to support efforts to preserve peace between warring ethnic groups. The IPMT – which included Defence (civilian and military) participation – helped oversee an end to inter-ethnic conflict and withdrew in June 2002 (Australian Government Department of Defence 2003: 21). After persistent pleas from the Solomon Island Government for Australian intervention, following a renewal of inter-ethnic conflict, Australia brought Pacific Forum Foreign Ministers to Sydney and said it would lead a regional intervention force, RAMSI. This was backed by the Pacific Islands Forum's Biketawa declaration of 2000, authorising regional action in the case of security crises arising in member countries (Firth 2008: 10).

In 2003, the then Australian Prime Minister, John Howard, emphasised that intervention into Solomon Islands was in Australia's national interest because failed states in the region could become safe havens for transnational criminals and terrorists (Breen 2008: 50). Perceptions that the Solomon Islands was on the brink of becoming a failed state, and the threat that this could pose for Australia's national interests, provided the primary rationale for the Australian led intervention (Allen 2011: 4). This rationale was heavily influenced by broader shifts in the international strategic environment following the 9/11 attacks in 2001 and the subsequent US led war on terror (Allen 2011: 4). The decision to launch the RAMSI initiative in 2003 marked a sharp departure from the policy paradigm of detachment which had shaped Australia's approach to its Pacific Island neighbours in the post colonial period (Wainwright & White 2004: 10).

On 24 July 2003, the first RAMSI personnel were deployed to Solomon Islands. Personnel numbers peaked at about 2250 in September /October 2003, comprising 1800 military (1500 of which were ADF personnel), 300 police, and civilian advisers (Fullilove 2006: 8). The military component was drawn down from late October 2003 in the wake of early successes in restoring security (Fullilove 2006: 8).

The Howard government redeployed troops to Solomon Islands in response to renewed unrest in Honiara in 2006 (Ayson 2007: 216). In 2006 Australia also worked with RAMSI partner New Zealand to deploy police and military personnel to assist the Tongan government's efforts to ensure security after riots in Nukuʻalofa (Ayson 2007: 216).

The police component, known as the Participating Police Force (PPF), has remained relatively constant in size, with the Australian Federal Police and the Australian Protective Service contributing about half its numbers, supplemented by officers from the Pacific states of New Zealand, PNG, Fiji, Tonga, Vanuatu, Nauru, Samoa, Kiribati, Tuvalu and the Cook Islands (Fullilove 2006 :8). The civilian element works in both line and advisory positions in Solomon Islands government agencies (Fullilove 2006: 8).

RAMSI's mission is to assist the Government of Solomon Islands in the maintenance of security, law and justice, economic governance and improving the machinery of government (Australian Government Department of Defence n.d.a). The main task for the military component is to be prepared to respond to incidents beyond the capabilities of the Royal Solomon Islands Police Force (RSIPF) and RAMSI's multi-national Participating Police Force (Australian Government Department of Defence n.d.a).

As of April 2012, initial talks began to determine a timetable for the withdrawal of the multinational military component of RAMSI, whilst maintaining the presence of the PPF (Radio Australia 2012).

== Maritime security ==
Australia has several objectives in promoting regional maritime security. At a strategic level, it's about provisions of assistance to the Pacific Island states to promote influence in the region (Bateman & Bergin 2008: 56). A second objective is to assist in building a more stable regional environment that will prevent threats from arising from the region that are inimical to Australia's interests (Bateman & Bergin 2008: 56).

=== The Pacific Patrol Boat Project (PPBP) ===
The Pacific Patrol Boat Project is said to be "the cornerstones of Australia's strategic influence in the region" (Bergin 2011:1). The project commenced in 1985 and twenty-two Pacific Class patrol boats have now been donated to twelve recipient countries (Bateman & Bergin 2008: 62). Through the PPBP, Australia provides financial, technical, logistics, maintenance, training and other support to 19 patrol boats across 11 Pacific Island countries (not including the three boats given to Fiji). Defence's support is underpinned by 25 Royal Australian Navy maritime surveillance and technical advisers located across the Pacific' (Australian Government Department of Defence 2011: 247).

The PPBP, supported by other measures designed to assist in the development of maritime security capacity, has been the feature of the Department of Defence's cooperation in the South Pacific. Australia's aim through these projects is to assists its neighbours 'to develop the capacity to protect their maritime resources and enforce sovereignty' (Australian Department of Defence 2009: 98). In 2010–11, the last patrol boat commenced a refit as part of the Defence-sponsored Life Extension Program which extends the life of the boats from 15 to 30 years. This program provides deep level maintenance to take the vessels through to their end of service life (Australian Department of Defence 2011: 247).

=== The Pacific Maritime Security Project (PMSP) ===
At the Pacific Islands Forum Leaders Meeting in August 2009, the Australian Government announced it would undertake an assessment, in consultation with Pacific Island countries, of a new maritime security program to follow the PPBP (Australian Government Customs and Border Protection Service 2011: 107). The goal of the PMSP is to 'develop a more integrated maritime security system that builds on the successes of the past to effectively and efficiently meet the challenges of managing the Pacific maritime domain' (Australian Government Customs and Border Protection Service 2011: 107). The PMSP was originally slated to be overseen by the Australian Customs and Border Protection Service but the responsibility for the program has recently been passed to the Department of Defence (Australian Government Department of Defence 2012).

=== Maritime surveillance ===
In addition to the PPBP, Australia makes other contributions to maritime surveillance and enforcement in the South Pacific. In 2009–2010, Australia supported seven successful regional maritime surveillance activities in the area (Bergin 2011: 2). Operation Solania, the ADF contribution to airborne maritime surveillance in the South Pacific, provides intelligence, surveillance and reconnaissance support to the Pacific Island countries (Australian Government Department of Defence n.d.b). The ADF contribution through Operation Solania is part of a wider maritime surveillance initiative with Australia's security partners in the region (the United States, New Zealand and France) through the regular Quadrilateral Defence Coordinating Group Talks (Bergin 2011: 2).

== Regional security cooperation ==
=== Bi-lateral cooperation ===
Australia's bi-lateral security engagement with the island states of the South Pacific is predominantly based around the Defence Cooperation Program (DCP) which has a broad goal of 'enhancing the defence related capabilities of regional partner nations' (Australian Government Department of Defence 2011: 246). The DCP includes a provision of ADF advisers, training initiatives and bi-lateral exercises, capacity building initiatives, and equipment and infrastructure projects (Nautilus Institute for Security and Sustainability 2009). One of the preeminent DCP projects is the PPBP. Australia does not have any bilateral defence ties with Fiji, having suspended all defence activities with Fiji following the 2006 Fijian military attempt to overthrow the elected government, and is yet to reinstate them (Hufbauer et al. 2012: 9).

== Multilateral cooperation ==
The main body through which Australia is involved in multilateral regional cooperation in the South Pacific is through the Pacific Islands Forum (PIF). Australia is one of fifteen regional countries that are members of the organisation, with Fiji having been suspended since 2009 as a result of continuing martial law rule and human rights violations (Hiebert & Shearer 2012: 2). The PIF has taken 'an important lead in authenticating a regional approach by claiming a general policy mandate for security' (Bergin & Herr 2011: 36). Four PIF declarations provide a mandate for law enforcement and security initiatives:

- -1992 Honiara Declaration on Law Enforcement Cooperation.
- -1997 Aitutaki Declaration on Regional Security Cooperation
- -2000 Biketawa Declaration
- -2002 Nasonini Declaration on Regional Security (Pacific Islands Forum Secretariat n.d.)

The 2005 Pacific Plan has built on this mandate by incorporating security as one of its four pillars alongside economic growth, sustainable development and good governance (Pacific Islands Forum Secretariat 2007: 2). The PIF Secretariat has taken on some administrative responsibility for implementing these initiatives, most notably through the establishment of the Forum Regional Security Committee to undertake security assessments and facilitate information and intelligence sharing (Bergin & Herr 2011: 36). Australia is also engaged multilaterally with regional states through their participation in RAMSI and is engaged multilaterally with regional security partners through the Quadrilateral Defence Coordinating Group Talks.

== Future of the relationship ==
Australia has made a commitment to continue its security relationship with the region with continued engagement through the development of the PMSP to follow on from the PPBP. With talks pertaining to the withdrawal of the military component of RAMSI underway, the nature of the ADF's presence in the South Pacific will change. Sometime between 2015 and 2020, Bougainville will vote on whether to secede from Papua New Guinea. Australia will likely play a role in the aftermath of the vote, no matter what the outcome is, this may include ADF intervention (Dobell 2011: 2).
