= Arc of Instability =

The Arc of Instability is a proposed, interconnected chain of politically unstable nation states in the Asia-Pacific region. The term came into vogue in the late 1990s, proving especially popular with Australian politicians and journalists, although it has been received with negative criticism from South Pacific leaders. The Arc is also sometimes referred to as Balkanization in a modern, Asia-Pacific context.

Delegates of the United Nations Security Council stated that without United Nations intervention, the Arc could make the entire area susceptible to becoming a terrorist hot spot, possibly so far as becoming a point of origin for international terrorist activity. Difficulty in slowing the Arcs progression stems from a variety of social and economic factors impeding the stabilization of member states, with use of military force being inadequate - unless there is an accompanying focus on protection of rights, promotion of peace, proliferation of new and ingenious terrorist groups, and the prevention of organized crime.

The phrase "Arc of Instability" has separately also been used by the National Intelligence Council to describe "a great arc of instability stretching from Sub-Saharan Africa through North Africa, into the Middle East, the Balkans, the Caucasus, and South and Central Asia, and parts of Southeast Asia."

== Definition and member states ==
The term is used to suggest that the members of the Arc are interconnected to the point that destabilization within one country can have major political, military and economic repercussions in neighboring countries. For example, Australian media and politicians claimed the destabilization of Solomon Islands was the result of a copycat or domino effect of the 2000 Fijian coup d'état.

In August 2006 Australian Defence Minister Brendan Nelson gave a speech to parliament on the topic of the Arc. Along with dropping Indonesia from the list of states in the Arc, he said:

We cannot afford to have failing states in our region. The so-called 'arc of instability', which basically goes from East Timor through to the south-west Pacific states, means that not only does Australia have a responsibility in preventing and indeed assisting with humanitarian and disaster relief, but also that we cannot allow any of these countries to become havens for transnational crime, nor indeed havens for terrorism.

There is no official list of member states in the Arc, however it has traditionally been accepted to include South-East Asian and Oceanic nations such as Papua New Guinea, Nauru, Vanuatu, The Solomon Islands, East Timor, and Indonesia. The inclusion of West Papua is contested. Fiji was removed from the Pacific Islands Forum and does not receive a binding security agreement from Australia due to diplomatic tensions.

In his 2016 study of the Dadaab refugee camp in Kenya, Ben Rawlence argues that the Horn of Africa has been at the epicentre of the Arc of Instability (which for Rawlence spreads from Mali in the west to Pakistan in the east) since 2008, when al-Shabaab took control of most of Somalia.

== Strategies of the Australian Government ==
In 2000, the Australian Department of Defence, under the Howard government, released a whitepaper stating the following:

In the Southwest Pacific, as in Papua New Guinea, our aim is to maintain our position as the key strategic partner. Australian interests in a stable and secure Southwest Pacific are matched by significant responsibilities as leader and regional power. We would be very likely to provide substantial support in the unlikely event that any country in the Southwest Pacific faced substantial external aggression.

Following this, the whitepaper released by the department in 2009 under the Rudd government did not seem to indicate any departure from the previous strategy:

After ensuring the defence of Australia from direct attack, the second priority task for the ADF is to contribute to stability and security in the South Pacific and East Timor. This involves conducting military operations, in coalition with others as required, including in relation to protecting our nationals, providing disaster relief and humanitarian assistance, and on occasion by way of stabilisation interventions as occurred in East Timor in 1999 and 2006, and in Solomon Islands in 2003

== Events in the Arc ==
This is a partial list of some events within an Arc which have typically been seen as contributing to the region's instability:

- Fijian coup d'état
- East Timor independence
- Bougainville conflict
- Solomon Islands intervention
- 2012 Papua New Guinea Defence Force mutiny

== See also ==
- Buffer zone
- Shatter belt (geopolitics)
