= Levantinization =

Levantine cultural influences in the former Ottoman Empire

Levantinization is a term used in different contexts to describe "Levantine" (i.e. non-European) cultural influences in the lands of the former Ottoman Empire, including in the Levant. The term often carries negative connotations (cf. Balkanization).

Cornell professor Deborah Starr uses the term to describe the fear of change to Israeli culture during the influx of Mizrahi Jews in the 1950s, some of whom had arrived from Levantine countries. In other contexts, the term has sometimes been used in an anti-Islamic context for the perceived "cultural contamination" of European values by "degenerate Levantine influences".

Srinivas Aravamudan describes it as "a strategic deformation of orientalism's representational mechanisms". Aravamudan writes that "levantinizations indicate that agency can be found in a number of guises and forms, sometimes within orientalism itself".

== Constantinople ==
Lady Mary Wortley Montagu's Letters from the Levant were written to well known persons of historical note like Lady Mar, Abbé Conti and Alexander Pope while her husband served as ambassador to Constantinople in the early 18th century. Her letters were first published in 1763.

Scholars have argued that Montagu complicates the concepts of "Eurocentrism and authoritarianism" emphasized by Edward Said, as challenges the binary conception of Eastern and Western cultures. Aravamudan argues that Montagu's levantinization, as he calls it, "demonstrates the ambivalence and the malleability of orientalist topologies".

According to Aravamudan's analysis of the letters, Montagu writes from "a secular anthropologizing stance towards cultures", which he says is a feature of post-Renaissance values that take in stride the "arbitrary norms that undergird cultural meaning and identity". Aravamudan says this viewpoint from which Montagu composed her letters "replaces the existing bias of a simple ethnocentricism in favor of the observer's culture with an eclectic relativism". Arvamudan believes that underlying this is the author's own feeling of being alienated from their home culture.

== Israel ==
As early as the mid-1930s fears of a loss of Jewish character had given way to a campaign against the so-called Levantinization of Tel Aviv. At the 25th anniversary of the city's founding in 1934 Hayyim Nahman Bialik said "A great danger faces our Tel Aviv, that it will become a levantine city, like other coastal cities." That same year Meir Dizengoff said "it develops into a noisy city, a wild levantine city, as if its residents were not the great-grandchildren of the ancestors whose feet stood on Mount Sinai and as if the Tel Avivan public is not entirely Jewish and civilized". Not all residents shared these concerns, some citing the examples of Berlin and Warsaw, European cities where anti-Semitism had thrived, as poor examples to follow.

For the Ashkenazi Jews in Israel the term Levantinization represented some cultural traits that were seen as threatening to the idea of Western modernity and by extension the core values of Israeli society. These included speaking Yiddish, wearing traditional clothing and certain types of religious thought. The Shinui party, founded by Yosef Lapid, who has been described as "Eurocentric, chauvinistic and anti-Mizrahi", viewed Levantinization as a threat to the existence of the state of Israel, along with the Haredim, Palestinians, and similar cultural influences of Russification and Orientalization. Lapid has said:

Levantiniut is a thin layer of European varnish spread over Mizrahi decadence. And under the Levantine tranquility, the lava of Arab nationalism and Islamic fundamentalism is simmering. We don't have anything to look for in this culture and we have no reason to yearn for it. Israel exists thanks to her being a western state, a state of high tech, a country that has adapted itself to the values of European culture and the concepts of Anglo Saxon democracy which are the total contrast to Levantine contamination.

Baruch Kimmerling wrote:

The mass immigration of non-European Jews had the potential to fundamentally change the system through 'Levantinization', and, from the perspective of the European veterans, to downgrade it to the 'low quality' of the surrounding Arab states and societies. In stereotypical terms, these immigrants were perceived as possessing a certain premodern biblical Jewish authenticity, although at the same time seen as aggressive, alcoholic, cunning, immoral, lazy, noisy, and unhygienic.

Egyptian-Israeli novelist Jacqueline Kahanoff has described herself as a "typical Levantine in that I appreciate equally what I inherited from my Oriental origins and what is now mine of Western culture". Kahanoff says that she finds the cultural cross fertilization "an enrichment and not an impoverishment", despite the negative label of "Levantinization" attached to the phenomenon in Israel.
