= Lebanonization =

Transformation of prosperous state into a failed state

Lebanonization (Hebrew: לבנוניזציה; Arabic: اللًَبْنَنَة) is a negative political term referring to the process of a prosperous, developed, politically stable country descending into a civil war or becoming a failed state, as is the case with Lebanon during the Lebanese Civil War. The term, mainly used in Israel to refer to the country's foreign policy in neighbouring Levantine states, was first used by Israeli President Shimon Peres in 1983, referring to the minimization of Israeli military presence in Lebanon following the 1982 Israeli invasion of Lebanon, occurring amidst the Lebanese Civil War. It is comparable to Balkanization, but occurs without secession, within the borders of one country.
