= Jakub J. Grygiel =

American academic (born 1972)

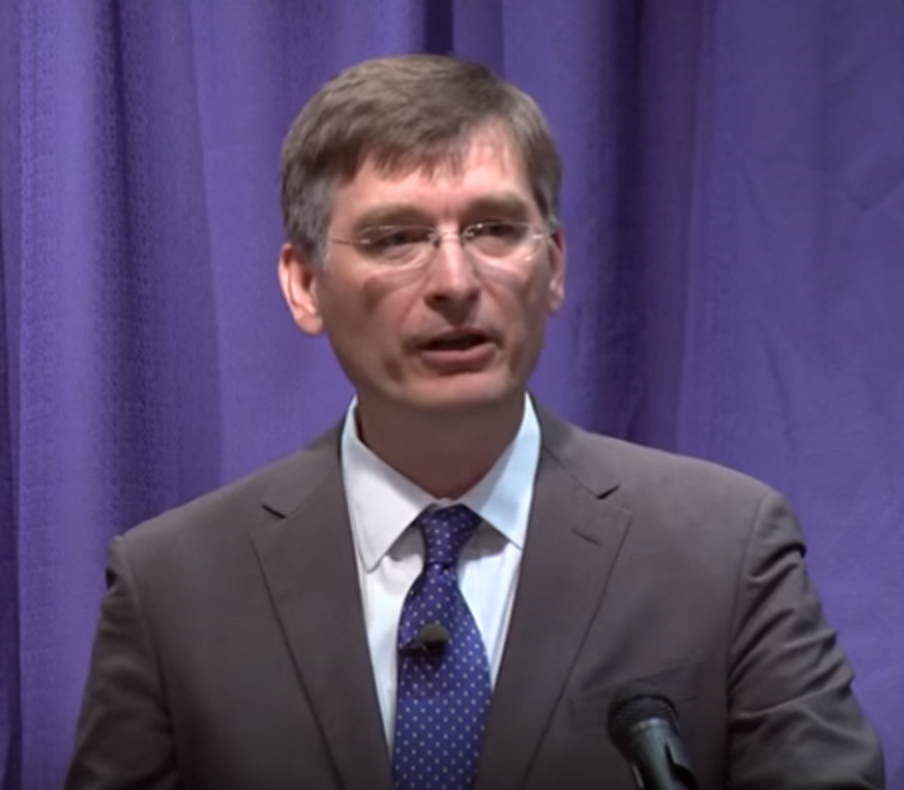
Jakub J. Grygiel

Jakub J. Grygiel (born 4 March 1972) is a professor of politics at the Catholic University of America and fellow at The Institute for Human Ecology. He is a senior advisor at The Marathon Initiative and a Visiting National Security Fellow at the Hoover Institution. He is also a book review editor for Orbis. In 2017-2018 he was a senior advisor to the Secretary of State in the Office of Policy Planning working on European affairs. Before joining the Department of State, he was George H. W. Bush Associate Professor at The Paul H. Nitze School of Advanced International Studies (Johns Hopkins University). Grygiel was a Senior Fellow at the Center for European Policy Analysis.

His book, The Unquiet Frontier, co-authored with Wess Mitchell, has been cited as having had a significant influence on National Security Advisor General H.R. McMaster's formulation of the 2017 U.S. National Security Strategy and the shift of emphasis in U.S. foreign policy to great-power competition. The book argues that rising and revisionist powers, Russia and China, are "probing" the periphery of the U.S.-led international order by placing pressure on U.S. allies, and that the United States should strengthen its alliances as a way of achieving strategic stability.

Grygiel was awarded the 2005 Rear Admiral Ernest M. Eller Prize in Naval History for an article on the US Navy in the early Cold War. He has written extensively on geopolitics, seapower, Russian foreign policy, European politics, and US foreign policy. His writings on international relations and security studies have appeared in Foreign Affairs, The American Interest, Security Studies, Journal of Strategic Studies, Orbis, Commentary, Parameters, as well as several U.S. and foreign newspapers.

Grygiel earned a Ph.D., M.A. and an MPA from Princeton University, and a BSFS summa cum laude from Georgetown University.

== Publications ==
=== Books ===
- Great Powers and Geopolitical Change. Johns Hopkins University Press. 2006. ISBN 978-0801884801.
- Unquiet Frontier: Rising Rivals, Vulnerable Allies, and the Crisis of American Power. Princeton University Press. 2016. ISBN 978-0691163758.
- Return of the Barbarians: Confronting Non-State Actors from Ancient Rome to the Present. Cambridge University Press. 2018. ISBN 978-1107158573.
