= Intermediate Region =

Geopolitical model set forth in the 1970s by the Greek historian Dimitri Kitsikis

The Intermediate Region is an established geopolitical model set forth in the 1970s by the Greek historian Dimitri Kitsikis, professor at the University of Ottawa in Canada. According to this model, the Eurasian continent is composed of three regions; in addition to Western Europe and the Far East, a third region called the "Intermediate Region" found between the two constitutes a distinct civilization. It roughly covers Eastern Europe, Central Asia, Middle East and North Africa (MENA).

== Description ==
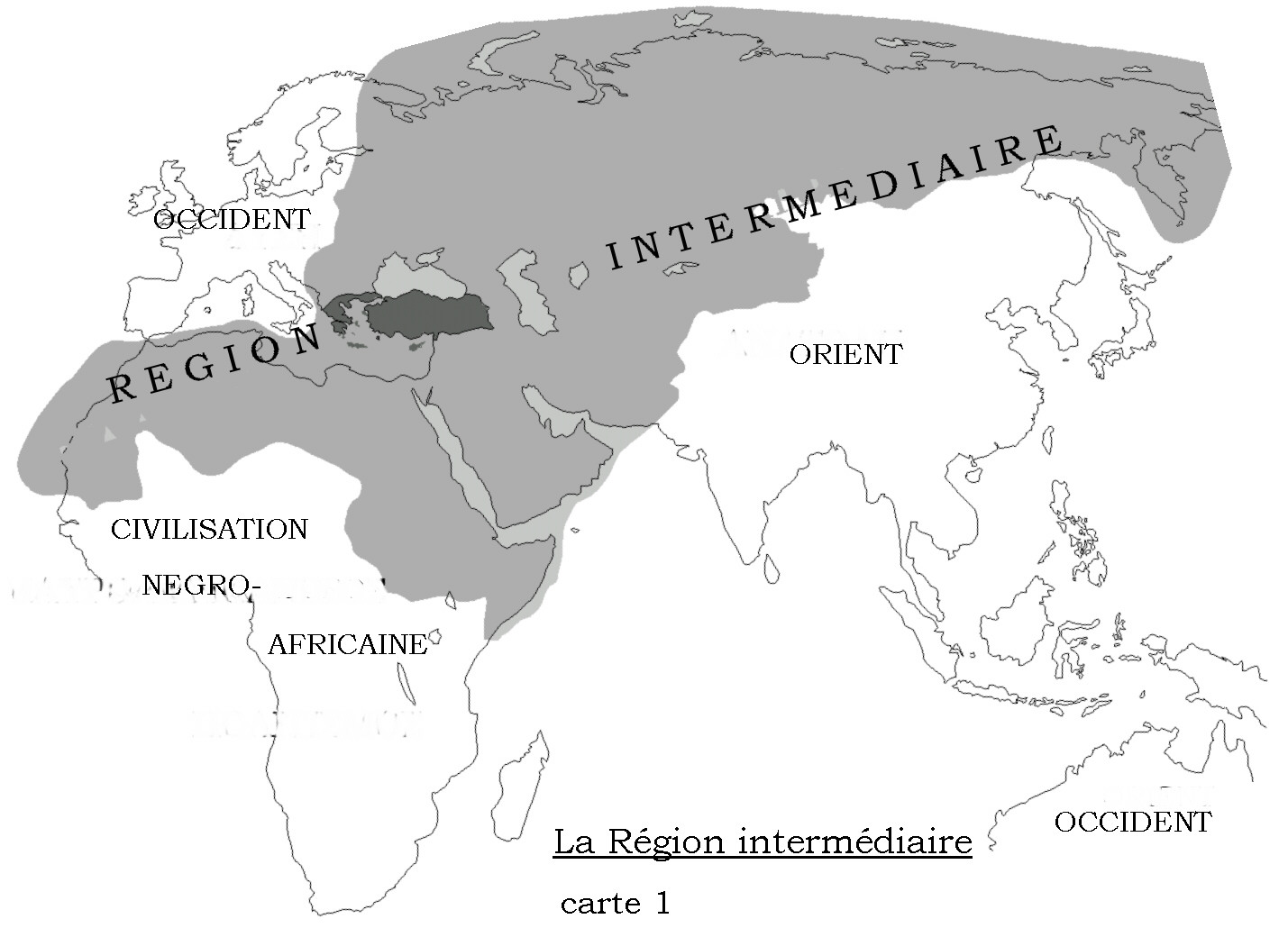
The Intermediate Region market in grey.

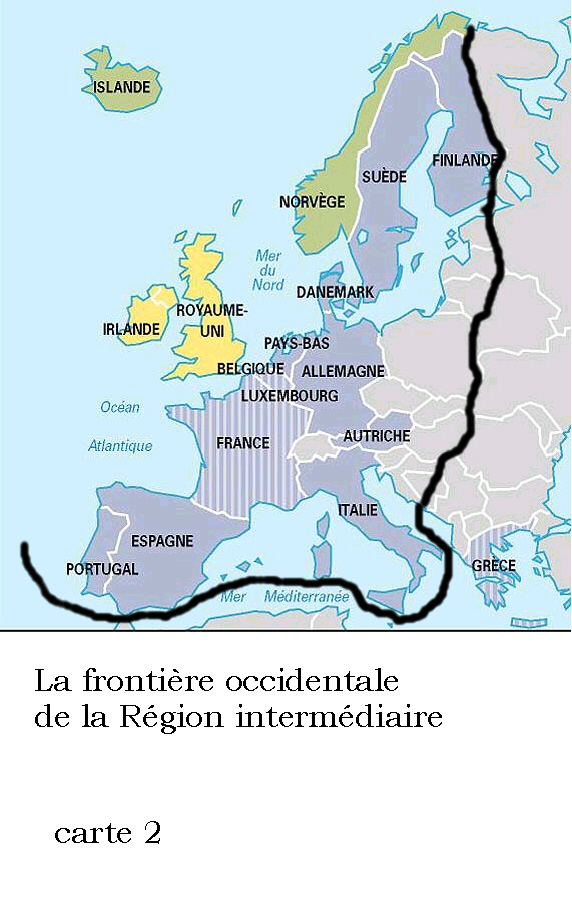
The western boundary of the Intermediate Region

The lands between the Adriatic Sea and the Indus River form the Intermediate Region and are considered a bridge between Western and Eastern civilisations. The vast area extends from the eastern half of Europe to the western half of Asia. Its significance is that there is neither a uniform Europe nor a uniform Asia. Europe and Asia denote geographical regions, not civilisations.

Demographically, the region's dominant religions are Orthodox Christianity and Islam, with Judaism to a lesser extent. In contrast, Catholicism and Protestantism dominate in the Occident, and Hinduism and Buddhism dominate in the Orient.

The Intermediate Region had, for 2,500 years, been dominated by an ecumenical empire whose centre lay by the Turkish Straits and the Aegean Sea. It was fundamentally the same empire throughout history, and its successive leaders sought to unify its respective peoples. From the Persian Empire of Darius the Great, it fell into the hands of Alexander the Great, then to the Hellenistic Roman Empire, the Byzantine Empire, and finally the Sunni Ottoman Empire until 1923–1924. This Central Empire had been subject to attempts by other empires situated along its periphery to seize succession. These included the Caliphate and the Russian Empire (until 1917).

The dynamic between the Central Empire and the Peripheral Empires constitutes an internal conflict in the Intermediate Region. Each of the main peoples in this area struggled to seize control of its centre of influence, that is, Byzantium-Constantinople-Istanbul, which remained the undisputed focal point for nearly 2,000 years. The Arabs, in the 8th century, and the Russians, in the 20th century, almost succeeded in doing so but were not able to take control of the ecumenical empire. Western intervention, since the 18th century, is considered to be an external conflict, which sought not succession but the destruction of the ecumenical empire and its dismemberment (Balkanisation) and its subjection to the stranglehold of Westernisation.

Kitsikis concludes that “due to historical events spanning thousands of years, the Eurasian continent, of which Europe is but one of its peninsulas, comprises three civilisational areas: a) the West, which today includes the United States, Canada, Australia and New Zealand, as well as Western Europe; b) the East or 'Far East', which includes the peninsulas of India, Southeast Asia (with Indonesia) and China (with Korea and Japan); c) the Intermediate Region, which is found both in the East and the West."

== See also ==
- Afro-Eurasia
- Arno Peters
- Eurasianism
- Eurasian Steppe
- Geographical midpoint of Europe
- Intermarium
- Ralph Peters
- The Clash of Civilizations
- The Geographical Pivot of History
- The Great Game
- Rimland
