= Haushofer =

Haushofer is a German language occupational surname, which means a worker or manager of a farm house or manor house. Related names include Hoffman, Hofer and Höfer. The surname Haushofer may refer to

- Albrecht Haushofer (1903–1945), German geographer
- Karl Haushofer (1869–1946), German general and geographer
- Marlen Haushofer (1920–1970), Austrian author
- Max Haushofer (1811–1866), German painter
