= Shatter belt (geopolitics) =

Concept in geopolitics

Shatter belt, shatter zone or crush zone is a concept in geopolitics referring to strategically-positioned and -oriented regions on a political map that are deeply internally divided and encompassed in the competition between the great powers in geostrategic areas and spheres.

The term was first applied in geopolitics in 1961 by Gordon East, an American scholar from Indiana University Bloomington. It was borrowed from geology, in which a shatter belt refers to a fault line, i.e. "belt of broken rock, produced by horizontal movement in a more or less vertical plane".

== Definitions ==
The conceptual foundation of the shatter belt in geopolitics stems from the approach of examining the world map of states and empires in terms of their geopolitical struggles and military and political relations. Shatter belts are defined as strategically positioned areas which are characterized by a greater inclination towards internal division, which gives rise to a high number of conflicts, and at the same time are strategically important for the great powers. The fragility of such regions is the result of long-standing clashes with a great deal of disruptive influence, light chaos, and, in general, a propensity for devastating conflicts in these regions. Hence the term "shatter belt" generally refers to a geographical region that is endangered by local conflicts within the states or between countries in the region, as well as the involvement of opposing great powers outside the region. Regions marked as a shatter belt are often blamed for interstate war and conflict, especially in relation to major power conflicts. Regarding their engagement and close connection with major and global conflicts of power, shatter belts are at the same time the main crisis hot spots or hard-to-reach areas in world politics and international relations. Unlike most geopolitical regions that have a different degree of cohesion, the regions considered shatter belts are global destabilizers.

The Balkans, Eastern Europe, Caucasus, Roof of the World and the Middle East have been associated with this concept.

== See also ==
- Arc of Instability
- Buffer zone
- Political fragmentation
- Rimland
- Balkanization
- Coup Belt
- Green Belt Theory
