= Saul B. Cohen =

American geographer (1925–2021)

- Born: 28 July 1925; Malden, Massachusetts, U.S.
- Died: 9 June 2021 (aged 95); Larchmont, New York, U.S.
- Education: Harvard College
- Known for: Developed Shatter belt concept
- Scientific career
- Fields: Human Geography
- Workplaces: Queens College, Hunter College

Saul Bernard Cohen (July 28, 1925 – June 9, 2021) was an American human geographer.

Cohen graduated from Harvard College just before the faculty closed its Department of Geography (1947–1951). He was president emeritus of the Queens College and was professor of geography at the Hunter College in New York and Clark University In Massachusetts.

== Publications ==
- Israel's Fishing Industry. In: Geog Rev, 1957. ASIN B004V2ZF1W
- With Gordon B. Turner. Naval War College Review, vol. X, no. 4, December 1957 ASIN B001SSQZYI
- As editor. New approaches in introductory college geography courses. Association of American Geographers Comm College Geog, 1967. ASIN B003TJXW6S
- Geography and Politics in a World Divided, 1963. ISBN 0195016955 (2nd ed.)
- Geography and the Environment. Voice of America Forum Lectures, 1968. ASIN B002VUL67S
- As geographic editor. Oxford World Atlas. Oxford University Press, 1973. ASIN B000OOHTRO
- Jerusalem: Bridging the Four Walls, a Geopolitical Perspective. Herzl Press, 1977. ASIN B000H0TY28
- The Geopolitics of Israel's Border Question (Jcss Study, No.7). Westview Press, 1987. ISBN 978-0-8133-0460-1
- Reflections on the Elimination of Geography at Harvard, 1947-51. In: Annals of the American Association of Geographers, 78, 1, 1988, p. 148-151.
- Columbia Gazetteer of the World Volume 1. Columbia University Press, 1998. ASIN B000PYGXFC
- Strategic Geography and the Changing Middle East.(Review): An article from: The Geographical Review. In: The Geographical Review, 1998, vol. 88, issue 1, p. 168(3).
- Textbooks that moved generations: Whittlesey, D. 1939: The earth and the state: a study of political geography. New York: Henry Holt and Company. In: Progress in Human Geography, 2002, 26, p. 679. doi:10.1191/0309132502ph396xx
- Geopolitics: The Geography of International Relations, 3rd edn., 2015.
