= Balkanization =

Fragmentation of a country or region

Territorial history of the Balkans from 1796 to 2008

Balkanization or Balkanisation is the process involving the fragmentation of an area, country, or region into multiple smaller, and often hostile, independent states. It is usually caused by differences in ethnicity, culture, religion, and geopolitical interests.

The term was coined in the early 20th century, and found its roots in the depiction of events during the Balkan Wars (1912–1913) and World War I (1914–1918), specifically referring to incidents that transpired earlier in the Balkan Peninsula.

The term is pejorative; when sponsored or encouraged by a sovereign third party, it has been used as an accusation against such third-party nations. Controversially, the term is often used by opponents of secessionism to highlight potential dangers. The Balkan peninsula is seen as an example of shatter belts in geopolitics.

== Origins of the term ==
Coined in the early 20th century, the term "Balkanisation" traces its origins to the depiction of events during the Balkan Wars (1912–1913) and the First World War (1914–1918). It did not emerge during the gradual secession of Balkan nations from the Ottoman Empire over the 19th century, but was coined at the end of the First World War. Albania was the only addition to the existing Balkan map at that time, as other nations had already formed in the nineteenth century. The term was initially employed by journalists and politicians, who used it as a conceptual tool to interpret the evolving global order resulting from the collapse of the Habsburg and Romanov Empires and the subsequent secession of Balkan nations following the Ottoman Empire's disintegration in the nineteenth century. After the Second World War (1939–1945), the term underwent significant development, expanding beyond its original context to encompass diverse fields such as linguistics, demography, information technology, gastronomy, and more. This expansion extended its descriptive reach to various phenomena, often with pejorative connotations. In response, critical scholars in the late 20th and early 21st centuries sought to denaturalise and reclaim 'balkanisation'.

== Nations and societies ==
Map of territorial changes in Europe after World War I (as of 1923)

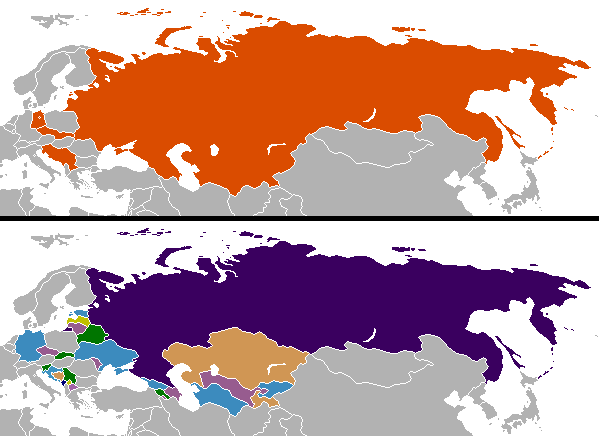
Changes in national boundaries after the end of the Cold War and the dissolution of the Soviet Union and breakup of Yugoslavia

The term (coined in the early 20th century in the aftermath of the collapse of the Ottoman Empire) refers to the division of the Balkan Peninsula, which was ruled almost entirely by the Ottoman Empire, into a number of smaller states between 1817 and 1912. It came into common use in the immediate aftermath of the First World War, with reference to the many new states that arose from the collapse of the Austro-Hungarian Empire and the Ottoman Empire.

== In Africa ==
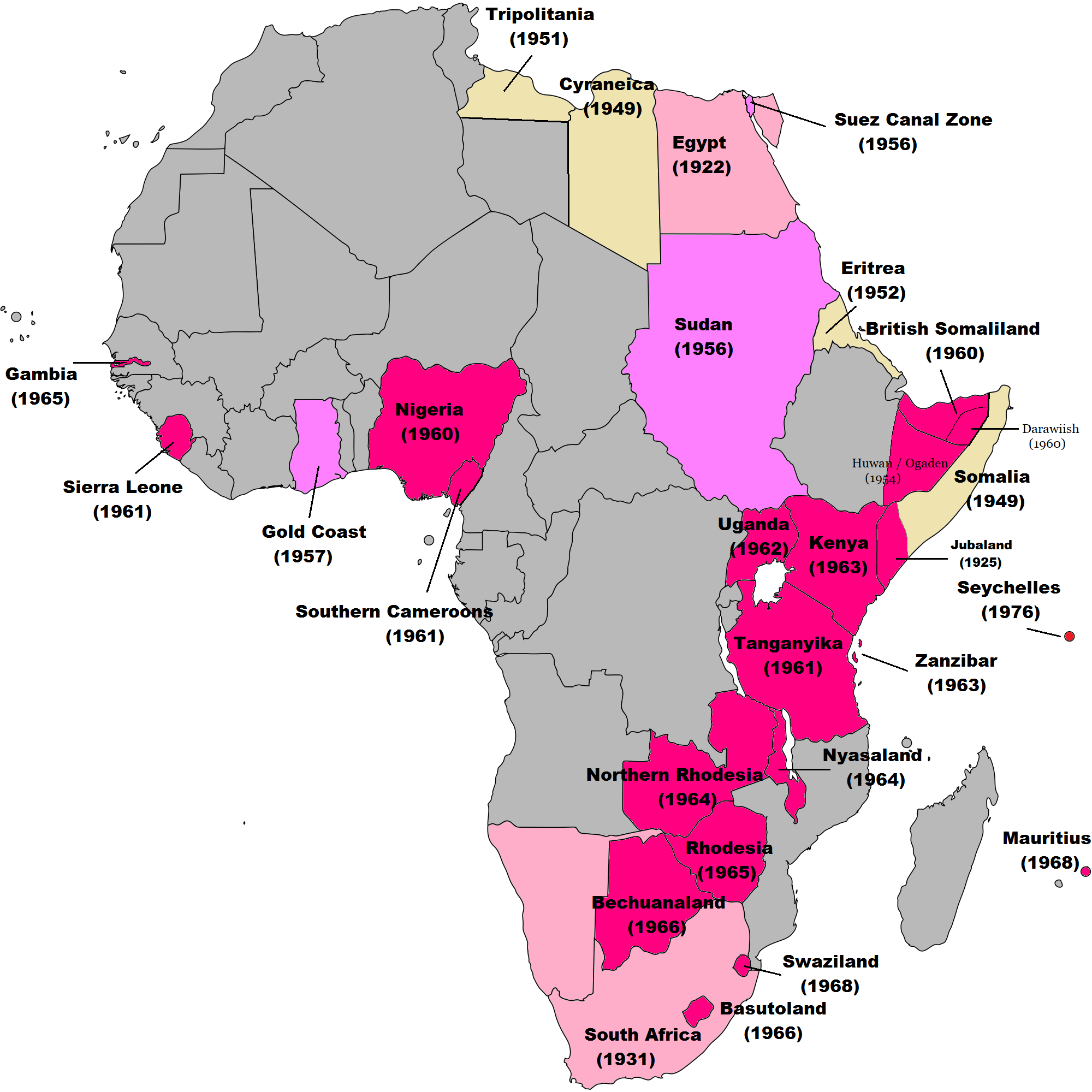
British decolonisation in Africa.

Bates, Coatsworth and Williamson argued Balkanisation was observed more greatly in West Africa than British East Africa. In the 1960s, countries in the Communauté Financière Africaine started to opt for "autonomy within the French community" in the postcolonial era. Countries in the CFA franc zone were allowed to impose tariffs, regulate trade and manage transport services.

Zambia, Zimbabwe, Malawi, Uganda and Tanzania achieved independence toward the end of when the Great Powers postcolonial era came about. The period also saw the breakdown of the Federation of the Rhodesias and Nyasaland as well as the East African High Commission. Splintering into today's nations was a result of the movement towards a closed economy. Countries were adopting antitrade and anti-market policies. Tariff rates were 15% higher than in OECD countries during the 1970s and 1980s. Furthermore, countries took approaches to subsidise their own local industries, but the interior markets were small in scale. Transport networks were fragmented; regulations on labor and capital flow were increased; price controls were introduced. Between 1960 and 1990, balkanisation led to disastrous results. The GDP of these regions were one tenth of OECD countries. Balkanisation also resulted in what van de Valle called "typically fairly overvalued exchanged rates" in Africa. Balkanisation contributed to what Bates, Coatsworth & Williamson claimed to be a lost decade in Africa.

Economic stagnation ended only in the mid-1990s. Countries within the region started to input more stabilisation policies. What was originally a high exchange rate eventually fell to a more reasonable exchange rate after devaluations in 1994. By 1994, the number of countries with an exchange rate 50 percent higher than the official exchange rate had decreased from 18 to four. However, there is still limited progress in improving trade policies within the region, according to van de Walle. In addition, the post-independent countries still rely heavily on donors for development plans. Balkanisation still has an impact on today's Africa. However, this causation narrative is not popular in many circles.

== In the Levant ==
During the 1980s, the Lebanese academic and writer Georges Corm used the term balkanisation to describe attempts by supporters of Israel to create buffer states based on ethnic backgrounds in the Levant to protect Israeli sovereignty. In 2013 the French journalist Bernard Guetta writing in the Libération newspaper applied the term to:

- Lebanon's political division between Muslims, Christians and Druze.
- The Syrian Civil War.

== See also ==
- Balkan Federation – Proposed country
- Balkan Wars – 1912–1913 conflicts in Balkan states
- Breakup of Yugoslavia – 1991–92 Balkan political conflict
- Cuius regio, eius religio – Historical legal principle
- Cyber-balkanization – Characterization of the Internet as splintering and dividing
- Detachment (territory) – Formal loss of sovereignty over territory
- Dissolution of Austria-Hungary – Historical event in 1918
- Dissolution of the Ottoman Empire – 1908–1922 political event
- Dissolution of the Soviet Union – 1988–1991 breakup of the sovereign state
- Spanish American wars of independence – 1808–1833 series of armed conflicts in the Americas
- Divide and rule – Strategy in politics and sociology
- Feudal fragmentation – Split of a feudal state into smaller states
- Kleinstaaterei – Historical territorial fragmentation in Germany
- Lebanonization – Transformation of prosperous state into a failed state
- Levantinization – Levantine cultural influences in the former Ottoman Empire
- Pakistanism – Division of a society along religious lines
- Pillarisation – Division of civil society along religio-political lines
- Powder keg of Europe – Metaphor for the political state of the Balkans in the early 20th century
- Protracted social conflict – Term for ongoing, complex conflicts
- Secession – Formal withdrawal of a group from a political entity
- Self-determination – Right to participate in one's own governance
- Self-governance – Mode of governance
- Shatter belt (geopolitics) – Concept in geopolitics
- Sovereignty – Supreme authority within a territory
- Treaty of Sèvres – Unratified 1920 treaty signed between the Ottoman Empire and the Allies
- Treaty of Trianon – 1920 peace treaty on Hungary after World War I
- Westphalian sovereignty – Concept of the sovereignty of nation-states
