= Nicholas J. Spykman =

American political scientist, 1893–1943

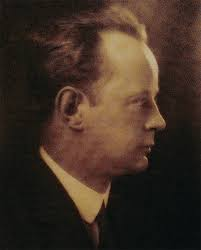
- Born: Nicholas John Spykman; October 13, 1893; Amsterdam, Netherlands
- Died: June 26, 1943 (aged 49); New Haven, Connecticut, U.S.
- Education: Delft University of Technology; University of Cairo; University of California, Berkeley (PhD)
- Occupation: Political scientist
- Spouse: E. C. Spykman (m. 1931)
- Children: 2 daughters

Nicholas John Spykman (/ˈspaɪkmæn/; October 13, 1893 – June 26, 1943) was a Dutch-American political scientist who was Professor of International Relations at Yale University from 1928 until his death in 1943. He was one of the founders of the classical realist school in American foreign policy, transmitting Eastern European political thought to the United States.

His work on geopolitics and geostrategy led him to be to known as the "godfather of containment." A Sterling Professor of International Relations, teaching as part of the Institute for International Studies at Yale University, one of his prime concerns was making his students geographically literate, as geopolitics was impossible without geographic understanding.

== Early life and education ==
Spykman was born on 13 October 1893 in Amsterdam. He attended Delft University of Technology and the University of Cairo.

He was married to the children's novelist E. C. Spykman. He worked as a journalist in various parts of the world during much of the 1910s and also served as a diplomatic assistant for the Netherlands in Egypt and the Dutch East Indies.

He then came to the United States around 1920 to enter a doctoral program at the University of California, Berkeley, where he received a bachelor's degree in 1921, a master's degree in 1922, and a Ph.D. in 1923. The subject of his dissertation, which he subsequently revised for publication, was Georg Simmel. He then was an instructor in political science and sociology there from 1923 to 1925. He became a naturalized citizen of the United States in 1928.

== Professor ==
In 1925, he came to Yale University, where he was an assistant professor of international relations. He became a full professor in 1928 and the chair of the university's department of international relations in 1935. Also in 1935, he was a co-founder of the Yale Institute of International Studies and was its first director. He held that position until 1940, when he became ill and relinquished it.

== Author ==
Spykman published two books on foreign policy.

America's Strategy in World Politics was published in 1942, soon after the entry of the United States into World War II. Concerned with the balance of power, he argued that isolationism, which relied on the oceans to protect the United States ("hemispheric" or "quarter defense"), was bound to fail. His object was to prevent another US retreat, as what occurred after World War I. The book was praised as an important contribution. The book got a laudatory front-page review in the New York Times Book Review. Isaiah Bowman commented in 1942, "On grounds of merit and public value America’s Strategy in World Politics should be read in not less than a million American homes. Every government official responsible for policy should read it once a year for the next twenty years—even if he may not agree with some of the remedies proposed."

The Geography of the Peace was published the year after Spykman's death. He explained his geostrategy and argued that the balance of power in Eurasia directly affected US security. In his writings on geography and foreign policy, Spykman was somewhat of a geographical determinist. Since geography was "the most fundamentally conditioning factor because of its relative permanence," it is of primary relevance in analyzing a state's potential foreign policy. However, Spykman rejected that geography had a "deterministic, causal role in foreign policy, arguing,

neither does the entire foreign policy of a country lie in geography, nor does any part of that policy lie entirely in geography. The factors that condition the policy of states are many; they are permanent and temporary, obvious and hidden; they include, apart from the geographic factor, population density, the economic structure of the country, the ethnic composition of the people, the form of government, and the complexes and pet prejudices of foreign ministers; and it is their simultaneous action and interaction that create the complex phenomenon known as "foreign policy."

According to Spykman, topography affected the unity and internal coherence of states, and climate affected the economic structure of the state. Spykman argued that the "comparative size of states" was a rough indication of the comparative strength of states (provided that there was political and economic integration of the state). He also argued that "Size is of primary importance as an element of defense, particularly if the vital centers of a country are far removed from the border."

He wrote that all states tend towards expansion, "Other things being equal, all states have a tendency to expand." Even small states seek to expand, but are limited in doing so by various barriers.

=== Quotations ===
- "Geography is the most fundamental factor in foreign policy because it is the most permanent."

—from The Geography of the Peace

- "Plans for far-reaching changes in the character of international society are an intellectual by-product of all great wars."

—from America's Strategy in World Politics

- "There are not many instances in history which show great and powerful states creating alliances and organizations to limit their own strength. States are always engaged in curbing the force of some other state. The truth of the matter is that states are interested only in a balance which is in their favor. Not an equilibrium, but a generous margin is their objective. There is no real security in being just as strong as a potential enemy; there is security only in being a little stronger. There is no possibility of action if one's strength is fully checked; there is a chance for a positive foreign policy only if there is a margin of force which can be freely used. Whatever the theory and rationalization, the practical objective is the constant improvement of the state's own relative power position. The balance desired is the one which neutralizes other states, leaving the home state free to be the deciding force and the deciding voice."

—from America's Strategy in World Politics

- "[A] political equilibrium is neither a gift of the gods nor an inherently stable condition. It results from the active intervention of man, from the operation of political forces. States cannot afford to wait passively for the happy time when a miraculously achieved balance of power will bring peace and security. If they wish to survive, they must be willing to go to war to preserve a balance against the growing hegemonic power of the period."

—from America's Strategy in World Politics

- "Nations which renounce the power struggle and deliberately choose impotence will cease to influence international relations either for evil or good."

—from America's Strategy in World Politics

- "The facts of location do not change. The significant of such facts changes with every shift in the means of communication, in routes of communication, in the technique of war, and in the centers of world power, and the full meaning of a given location can be obtained only by considering the specific area in relations to two systems of reference: a geographic system of reference from which we derive the facts of location, and a historical system of reference by which we evaluate those facts."

—from "Geography and Foreign Policy I", American Political Science Review, Vol XXXII, No. 1 (February 1938), p. 29.

== Geostrategic ideas ==
He could be considered as a disciple and critic of both geostrategists Alfred Mahan, of the United States Navy, and Halford Mackinder, the British geographer. Spykman's work is based on assumptions similar to Mackinder, the unity of world politics and the unity of the world sea, but extends it to include the unity of the air. The exploration of the entire world means that the foreign policy of any nation will affect more than its immediate neighbors; it will affect the alignment of nations throughout the world's regions. Maritime mobility opened up the possibility of a new geopolitical structure: the overseas empire.

Spykman adopts Mackinder's divisions of the world but renames some:

- the Heartland
- the Rimland (analogous to Mackinder's "inner or marginal crescent")
- the Offshore Islands & Continents (Mackinder's "outer or insular crescent")

=== Heartland ===
At the same time, even if he gives credit to the strategic importance of maritime space like Mackinder, he does not see it as a region that will be unified by powerful transportation or communication infrastructure in the near future. As such, it will not be in a position to compete with US sea power. Spykman agrees that the Heartland offers a uniquely-defensive position, but that is all Spykman grants its occupier.

While the USSR encompassed a great expanse of land, its arable land remained in a small portion of its territory, mostly in the West. Indeed, the Soviet's raw materials were largely located to the West of the Ural Mountains as well. Since the political and material center of gravity was in the Western part of the USSR, Spykman sees little possibility of the Soviets exerting much power in Central Asia.

Still, the Soviet Union was to remain the greatest land power in Asia and could be a peacekeeper or a problem.

=== Rimland ===
The Rimland (Mackinder's "Inner or Marginal Crescent") sections:

- the European coast land;
- the Arabian-Middle Eastern desert land; and,
- the Asiatic monsoon land.

While Spykman accepts the first two as defined, he rejects the simple grouping the Asian countries into one "monsoon land." India, the Indian Ocean littoral, and the culture of India had a geography and civilization separate from the Chinese lands.

The Rimland's defining characteristic is that it is an intermediate region, lying between the Heartland and the marginal sea powers. As the amphibious buffer zone between the land powers and sea powers, it must defend itself from both sides, the cause of its fundamental security problems. Spykman's conception of the Rimland bears greater resemblance to Alfred Thayer Mahan's "debated and debatable zone" than to Mackinder's Inner or Marginal Crescent.

The Rimland has great importance because of its demographic weight, natural resources, and industrial development. Spykman sees that its importance to be the reason that the Rimland will be crucial to containing the Heartland, but Mackinder had believed that the Outer or Insular Crescent would be the most important factor in containing the Heartland.

=== Offshore continents ===
There are two offshore continents flanking Eurasia: Africa and Australia. Spykman sees both continents' geopolitical status as determined respectively by the state of control over the Mediterranean Sea and the "Asiatic Mediterranean." Neither has ever been the seat of significant power; chaos prevents Africa from harnessing the resources of its regions, and Australia has too little arable territory.

Other than the two continents, the offshore islands of significance are Britain, Japan and the New World, buffered by the Atlantic Ocean and the Pacific Ocean.

=== Eurasian dynamics ===
Again, Spykman differs from Mackinder, who sees Eurasian wars as historically pitting the Heartland against the sea powers for control of the rimland, establishing a land power-sea power opposition. Spykman states that historically, battles have pitted either Britain and Rimland allies against Russia and its Rimland allies or Britain and Russia together against a dominating Rimland power. In other words, the Eurasian struggle was not the sea powers containing the Heartland but the prevention of any power from ruling the Rimland.

Spykman disagrees with Mackinder's famous dictum:

Who controls eastern Europe rules the Heartland;
Who controls the Heartland rules the World Island; and
Who rules the World Island rules the World.

He refashions it thus:

Who controls the Rimland rules Eurasia;
Who rules Eurasia controls the destinies of the world.

Therefore, British, Russian, and US power would play the key roles in controlling the European litoral and there the essential power relations of the world.

=== US strategic goals ===
Spykman thought that it was in the American interests to leave Germany strong after World War II to be able to counter Russia's power. Strategically, there was no difference between Germany dominating all the way to the Ural or Russia controlling all the way to Germany, and as both scenarios were equally threatening to the US.

Spykman predicted that Japan would lose the Pacific War and that China and Russia would remain to struggle against each other over boundaries. He also forecast the rise of China, becoming the dominant power in Asia and that the US would thus take responsibility for Japan's defense.

Spykman was opposed to European integration and argued that US interests favored balanced power in Europe, rather than integrated power. The US was fighting a war against Germany to prevent Europe's conquest, and it would not make sense to federalize or to unify Europe after a war that had been fought to preserve balance.

== Death ==
He died of heart complications on 26 June 1943, at the age of 49, in New Haven, Connecticut, a result of kidney disease contracted when young.

== Works ==
=== Books ===
- The Geography of the Peace, New York, Harcourt, Brace and Company (1944)
- America's Strategy in World Politics: The United States and the Balance of Power, New York, Harcourt, Brace and Company (1942)
- The Social Theory of Georg Simmel, Chicago, University of Chicago Press (c. 1925)

=== Articles ===
- The Social Background of Asiatic Nationalism, The American Journal of Sociology 1926, issue 3
- International Relations from the Point of View of Teaching, in: Proceedings of the Fourth Conference of Teachers of International Law and Related Subjects, Washington 1930
- Methods of Approach to the Study of International Relations, in: Proceedings of the Fifth Conference of Teachers of International Law and Related Subjects, Washington 1933
- States’ Rights and the League, The Yale Review 1934, issue 2
- Geography and Foreign Policy, I, The American Political Science Review 1938, issue 1
- Geography and Foreign Policy, II, The American Political Science Review 1938, issue 2
- with A. A. Rollins, Geographic Objectives in Foreign Policy, I, The American Political Science Review 1939, issue 3
- with A. A. Rollins, Geographic Objectives in Foreign Policy, II, The American Political Science Review 1939, issue 4
- Frontiers, Security, and International Organization, Geographical Review 1942, issue 3
