= Regional geography =

Branch of geography

Regional geography is one of the major traditions of geography. It focuses on the interaction of different cultural and natural geofactors in a specific land or landscape, while its counterpart, systematic geography, concentrates on a specific geofactor at the global level.

== Basics ==
Attention is paid to unique characteristics of a particular region such as natural elements, human elements, and regionalization which covers the techniques of delineating space into regions. Rooted in the tradition of the German-speaking countries, the two pillars of regional geography are the idiographic study of Länder or spatial individuals (specific places, countries, continents) and the typological study of Landschaften or spatial types (landscapes such as coastal regions, mountain regions, border regions, etc.).

== Approach ==
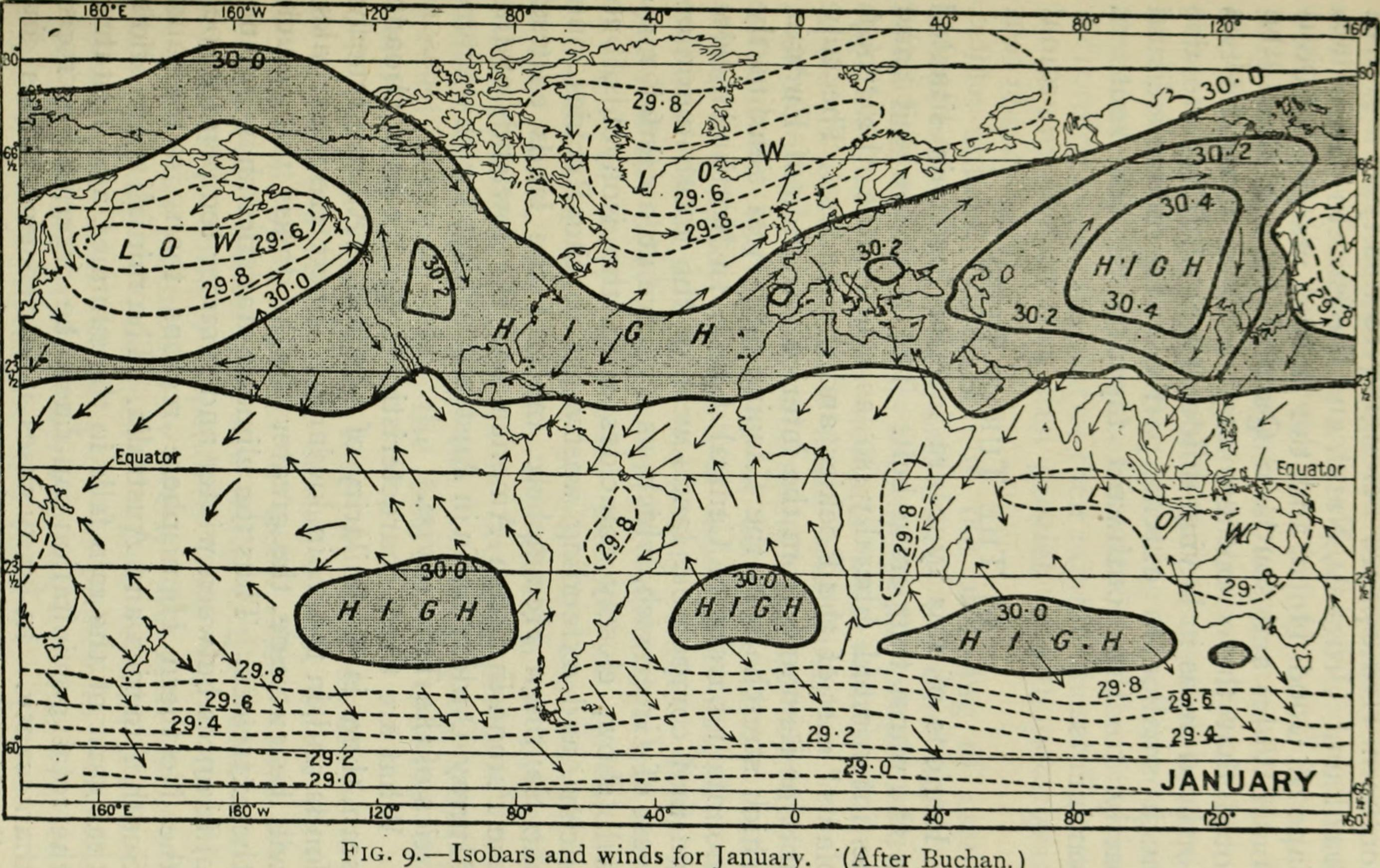
Diagram of regional geography of the world

Regional geography is also a certain approach to geographical study, comparable to quantitative geography or critical geography. This approach prevailed during the second half of the 19th century and the first half of the 20th century, a period when the regional geography paradigm was central within the geographical sciences. It was later criticised for its descriptiveness and the lack of theory. Strong criticism was leveled against it in particular during the 1950s and the quantitative revolution. Main critics were G. H. T. Kimble and Fred K. Schaefer.

The regional geography paradigm has influenced many other geographical sciences, including economic geography and geomorphology. Regional geography is still taught in some universities as a study of the major regions of the world. In the Western Hemisphere, these may be cultural regions such as Northern and Latin America, or their corresponding geographic regions or continents, namely North and South America, whose "boundaries" differ significantly from the cultural regions. In the Eastern Hemisphere, Europe and Asia may be considered cultural regions or as continents depending on the criteria used to differentiate between them and determine their shared boundaries. These discrepancies arise from the aforementioned lack of a unifying theory behind the definitions and delineations of these continents and regions.

In addition, the notion of a city-region approach to the study of geography, underlining urban-rural interactions, gained credence since the mid-1980s. Some geographers have also attempted to reintroduce a certain amount of regionalism since the 1980s. This involves a complex definition of regions and their interactions with other scales.

Regional geography was once used as a basis for the geomorphological works such as those of David Linton and Henri Baulig. Yet, according to Karna Lidmar-Bergström regional geography is since the 1990s no longer accepted by mainstream scholarship as a basis for geomorphological studies.

== Notable figures ==
Notable figures in regional geography were Alfred Hettner in Germany, with his concept of chorology; Paul Vidal de la Blache in France, with the possibilism approach (possibilism being a softer notion than environmental determinism); and, in the United States, Richard Hartshorne with his concept of areal differentiation. The school of Carl O. Sauer, strongly influenced by Alfred Hettner and Paul Vidal de la Blache, is also seen as regional geography in its broadest sense.

== See also ==
- Chorography
- Regional planning
- Regional studies
