= Hettner =

Hettner is a surname. Notable people with the surname include:

- Alfred Hettner (1859–1941), German geographer
- Hermann Theodor Hettner (1821–1882), German historian
- Otto Hettner (1875–1931), German painter, illustrator, engraver, and sculptor
- Sabine Hettner (1907–1985), French modernist painter
