= Flora Croatica Database =

Online database of Croatian vascular flora

- Website type: Biodiversity
- Website: hirc.botanic.hr/fcd
- Current status: Active

Flora Croatica Database (FCD) is an online biological database that documents the vascular plant diversity of Croatia, with recent expansions to bryophytes, algae and lichens. Maintained by the Faculty of Science, University of Zagreb, the database originated from botanical database efforts initiated in the early 1990s, and was later developed into an online bilingual system launched in 2004. The database is part of the Nature Protection Information System of Croatia, and serves as a resource for botanical research and biodiversity management. The platform is designed as an interactive, multi-user system that allows distributed data entry and management. As of 2026, its dataset includes more than 5000 species and subspecies in more than 1000 families, reflecting the diversity of Croatian flora. The database has become an internationally recognized source of verified data, with up to one million queries a year and up to 400 users per day.

== Overview ==
The Flora Croatica Database is designed as a comprehensive repository of information on plant species occurring in Croatia. The database is organized into multiple modules covering taxonomic classification and nomenclature, synonymy and authorship of taxa, name origins, geographic distribution (chorology), ecological characteristics, conservation status and threat assessment, alien species status, economic uses of plants, a photo archive, bibliographic references, herbarium records, and common names in multiple languages. The system also incorporates geospatial components, enabling mapping and spatial analysis of plant distributions. It is capable of handling various types of data, including numerical, textual, audio, and video content. Since its initial release, the database has undergone continuous updates and expansions, including revisions of modules related to non-native (allochthonous) and threatened species (Red Book). The system operates independently but is connected to national environmental information infrastructure, allowing data exchange with other biodiversity-related platforms.

The database is curated by professional botanists from various institutions, and it is used by a broad range of users, including individuals, public agencies, museums, educational and research institutions, and private companies, with collaborative agreements supporting shared data contribution and access. Generalized data are publicly available through an online interface and map viewer, while detailed datasets may require registration or authorization from relevant institutions.

As of late 2025, linking and reciprocal data contributions to Flora Croatica Database and the Global Biodiversity Information Facility (GBIF) and Biodiversity Atlas of Croatia (BioAtlas) is in its decisive phase.
