= Hertner =

Hertner is a German surname. Notable people with the surname include:

- Fabian Hertner (born 1985), Swiss orienteer
- Sebastian Hertner (1991–2025), German footballer

== See also ==
- Herter
- Hettner
