= Alfred Hettner =

German geomorphologist (1859–1941)

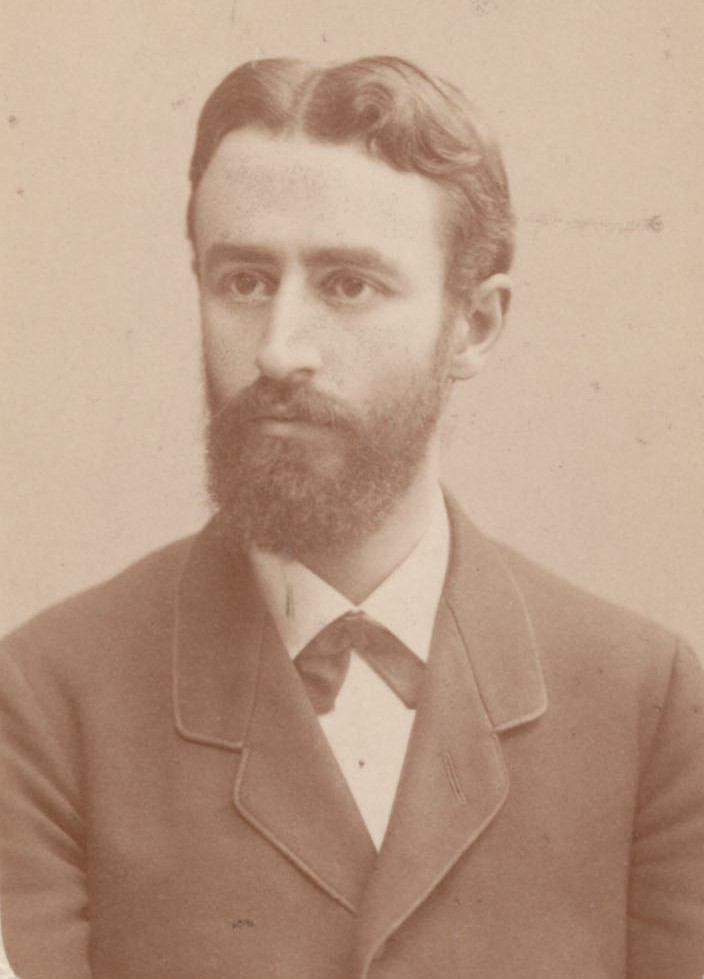
- Born: 6 August 1859; Dresden
- Died: 31 August 1941 (aged 82); Heidelberg
- Education: University of Strasbourg
- Known for: Chorological approach to geography; fieldwork in Colombia and Chile.
- Scientific career
- Workplaces: Heidelberg University (1899–1928)
- Doctoral students: Martha Krug-Genthe, Oskar Schmieder, Friedrich Metz (de), Heinrich Schmitthenner (de)

Alfred Hettner (6 August 1859, in Dresden – 31 August 1941, in Heidelberg) was a German geographer.

Hettner is known for his concept of chorology, the study of places and regions, a concept that influenced both Carl O. Sauer and Richard Hartshorne. Apart from the geography of Europe, his fieldwork concentrated mainly on that of Colombia, Chile and Russia.

== Early life and education ==
Hettners parents were art historian Hermann Theodor Hettner and Marie von Stockmar. His maternal grandfather was Christian Friedrich, Baron Stockmar. His half-brother was Otto Hettner.

== Career ==
Hettner obtained his PhD from the University of Strasbourg, and was also a pupil of Ferdinand von Richthofen and Friedrich Ratzel at Leipzig—where he obtained his habilitation.

According to him, geography is a chorological science or it is a study of regions. Hettner rejected the view that geography could be either general or regional. Geography, like other fields of learning, must deal in both unique things (regional geography) and with the universal (general geography), but the study of regions — especially in the form of his Länderkunde approach — is the main field of geography. Hettner supervised, among others, the PhDs of Martha Krug-Genthe, Oskar Schmieder, Friedrich Metz and Heinrich Schmitthenner.

In 1895, he founded the journal Geographische Zeitschrift, which he also edited for many years. He was a lecturer briefly at Tübingen (1894-1897) and Leipzig (1897-1899).

In 1899, he joined University of Heidelberg as an associate professor. By 1906, he became the first Chair of Geography at Heidelberg. His book Europe was published in 1907. He held this office until his retirement in 1928. From 1920-1931 or possibly longer he was the director of the Heidelberg section of the Deutsche Kolonialgesellschaft.

He died in Heidelberg in 1941.

== Literary works ==
- Methodische Zeit- und Streitfragen, in: Geographische Zeitschrift, Bd. 29 (1923), S. 49-50
- Die Geographie, ihre Geschichte, ihr Wesen und ihre Methoden, Breslau, 1927

== Legacy ==
Hettner had a significant impact on Richard Hartshorne's The Nature of Geography.
