= Edward Augustus Ackerman =

American geographer

- Born: December 5, 1911; Post Falls, Idaho, U.S.
- Died: March 8, 1973 (aged 61); Washington, D.C., U.S.
- Education: Harvard University (AB, PhD)

Edward Augustus Ackerman (born December 5, 1911 – died March 8, 1973) was an American geographer and an authority in the management of hydric resources in US. He was member of several committees and advisory groups on management of natural resources, population growth, the environment and conservation. Through his career he placed emphasis on the need of a sustainable management of the natural resources. A key element of Ackerman thinking is the concept of system and the interactions between the people and the nature. According to Ackerman "the objective of Geography is to understand the great system that encompasses the humanity and its environment on Earth's surface".

== Biography ==
Ackerman was born in Post Falls, Idaho. By the time he reached the age of 12 both his parents were dead. He attended Coeur d’Alene High School, in 1930 he was awarded a scholarship to study at Harvard University. During his first term at Harvard his talent was noted by Derwent Whittlesey then the professor of Human Geography in the Geology and Geography Department at Harvard. Whittlesey became his professor, mentor and promoter, and supervised Ackerman's PhD dissertation which he completed in 1939. Upon graduating Ackerman was teacher at Harvard during the period 1940 – 1948.

During the Second World War, Ackerman was contracted by the Coordinator Of Information (COI), a dependency that would be the origin of the Office of Strategic Services (OSS) (that latter would be the origin of the CIA). From this post he collaborated with the military effort, initially working in the Geographic Report Section of the Geography Division. Ackerman was responsible for planning and managing the drafting of documents that provided intelligence information on the different geographic areas where the war was taking place, including the assessment of beaches for disembarkments, and even the level of empathy and political and social preferences of the people living in the places where the US Army would be moving through. In 1942 ha was appointed Manager of OSS Topographic Intelligence subdivision of the Europe-African Division. The Geographic Reports he helped to produce, were later the base of what would be the Joint Army Navy Intelligence Surveys (JANIS) and latter would become the source material for the CIA World Factbook.

After Japan was occupied by US in September 1945, Ackerman was commissioned to develop the policies for the development and management of Japan resources; he work on this assignment between 1946 – 1948 as member of the Natural Resources Section (NRS). Among the tasks undertaken by the NRS was the redistribution of the agricultural land, given that up to late 1945 Japan's agriculture system was essential a feudal one, with the poor peasants paying a fee for the land they labored. A third of the agricultural land changed hands as a result of the implementation of the redistribution policy.

In the period 1952 – 1954 he was vice general director of the Tennessee Valley Authority, being the director of the program "Hydric Resources for the Future" (1954–1958). From 1958 and until his death he was director of the Carnegie Institute. He died in Washington D.C..

== Selected works ==
- Geography as a fundamental research discipline, Ackerman, Edward A, The University of Chicago Press, Department of Geography, Research Paper, nø 53, Chicago, 1958.
- The Science of Geography, Ackerman, Edward A, Report for the National Academy of Science-National Research Council of the United States, Washington, D.C., 1965.
- Ackerman, Edward A. 1963. Where is a Research Frontier? Annals of the Association of American Geographers 53: 429–440.
- Ackerman, E.A. 1946. Japan: Have or have not nation? in Japan’s Prospect, ed., D.G. Harris, 25–41. Cambridge, MA: Harvard University Press.
- Ackerman, E.A. 1946. The industrial and commercial prospect, in Japan’s Prospect, ed., D.G. Harris, 175–205. Cambridge, MA: Harvard University Press.
- Ackerman, E.A. 1953. Japan’s Natural Resources and their Relation to Japan’s Economic Future. Chicago, IL: Chicago University Press.

== See also ==
- History of geography

== Bibliography ==
- "Edward A Ackerman 1911–1973. Gilbert F. White, Annals of the Association of American Geographers, Volume 64, Issue 2, pages 297–309, March 1974
- E. Ackerman, "biographical Data Concerning Dr. Edward Augustus Ackerman," no date, Box 38, "1940–1942", Ackerman, Edward A. Papers 1930–1973. American Heritage Center, University of Wyoming at Laramie.
