= Franz Steiner Verlag =

German academic publishing house

- Founded: 1949
- Country of origin: Germany
- Headquarters location: Stuttgart
- Official website: www.steiner-verlag.de

Franz Steiner Verlag GmbH is a German academic publishing house, with headquarters in Stuttgart.

Founded in 1949 in Wiesbaden, its specialty is history, although it also publishes works in geography, philosophy, law, and musicology. In 2008, the program was expanded to include nonfiction books for a wider readership. Today, the publishing house is part of the Deutscher Apotheker Verlag media group.

Journals published by Franz Steiner include Historia, Geographische Zeitschrift, Hermes, and Zeitschrift für französische Sprache und Literatur.
