= Wilhelm Sievers =

German geologist and geographer

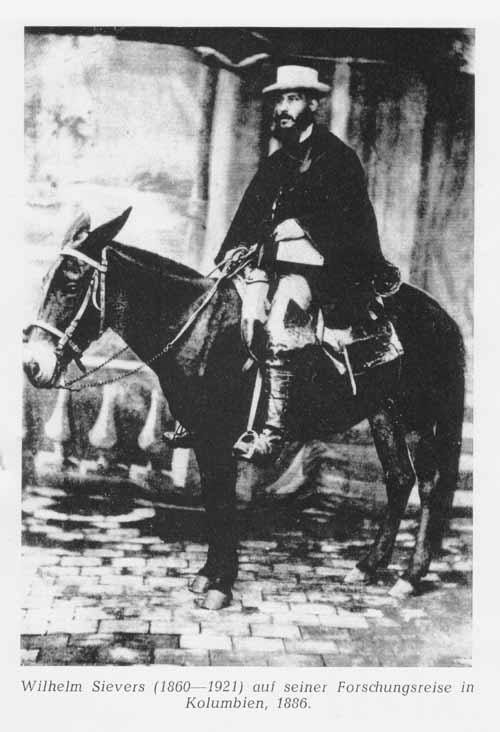
- During his first expedition to Colombia in 1886

Friedrich Wilhelm Sievers (3 December 1860 – 11 June 1921) was a German geologist and geographer. He served as a professor of geography at the University of Giessen. His fieldwork focused on South America, and his Allgemeine Länderkunde was a standard work on world geography for several decades.

== Biography ==
Sievers was born into a merchant family in Hamburg. He was educated at Jena, Göttingen, and Leipzig, and became a Privatdozent at Würzburg in 1887 after extensive travels in Venezuela and Colombia. In his education, he broke with his mercantile family's tradition to study the emerging academic field of geography. He was one of Ferdinand von Richthofen's first students.

On instructions from the Geological Society of Hamburg, he made three expeditions to South America to carry out geographical and geological studies on the different regions of the country, inspired by the expeditions of Alexander von Humboldt. Sievers mainly focusing on documenting evidence for a South American ice age. In 1902, from the cathedra of Geography of the University of Giessen, he publicly opposed the naval blockade that Germany, England and Italy imposed on Venezuela to force the collection of the foreign debt. In 1909, he established the headwaters of the Marañón, the main source of the Amazon river.

Wilhelm Sievers published the Allgemeine Länderkunde (several editions 1891–1935), which for several decades was the leading international geographical publication covering all continents.

== Journeys ==
- 1884-1886: Colombia and Venezuela
- 1891-1893: Venezuela
- 1909: Peru and Ecuador

== Selected works ==
=== South America ===
- Reise in der Sierra Nevada de Santa Marta, 1887
- Venezuela, 1888
- Die Cordillere von Mérida, nebst Bemerkungen über das Karibische Gebirge, 1888
- Zweite Reise in Venezuela in den Jahren 1892-93, 1896
- Die Quellen des Marañon-Amazonas, 1910
- Reise in Peru und Ekuador, Ausgeführt 1909, 1914

=== Allgemeine Länderkunde ===
- Allgemeine Länderkunde: Erste Ausgabe in fünf Bänden, First edition in five volumes, 1891–95
- Allgemeine Länderkunde: Zweite Ausgabe in sechs Bänden, Second edition in six volumes, 1901–05
- Allgemeine Länderkunde: Kleine Ausgabe in zwei Bänden, Compact edition in two volumes, 1907
- Allgemeine Länderkunde: Dritte Ausgabe in sechs Bänden, Third edition 1914 (Due to the outbreak of World War I, this edition remained incomplete)
- Allgemeine Länderkunde: Begr. von W. Sievers, Third/fourth edition, 1924–35

=== Other publications ===
- Über die Abhängigkeit der jetzigen Konfessionsverteilung in Südwestdeutschland von den früheren Territorialgrenzen (Dissertation), Göttingen 1884.
- Zur Kenntnis des Taunus, Stuttgart, 1891

== Literature ==
- F. Oliver Brachfield: Sievers en Mérida. De los apuntes de un geógrafo alemán en la Cordillera – 1885, Mérida 1951.
- P. Claß: Universitätsprofessor Dr. Wilhelm Sievers †. Ein Nachruf, Geographischer Anzeiger, 23. Jahrg. 1922 Heft 1/2
- C. Schubert: Hermann Karsten (1851) y Wilhelm Sievers (1888): las primeras descripciones e interpretaciones sobre el órigen de las terrazas aluviales en la Córdillera de Mérida. Bol. Hist. Geocien. Venez., 44, pp 15–19
