= Martha Krug-Genthe =

German geographer (1871 – 1945)

- Born: Martha Krug; 1871
- Died: 1945 (aged 73–74)
- Spouse: Karl Wilhelm Genthe

Academic background
- Education: Leipzig University, Heidelberg University
- Doctoral advisor: Alfred Hettner
- Influences: Friedrich Ratzel

Academic work
- Institutions: Beacon School in Hartford, Connecticut

Martha Krug-Genthe (1871–1945) was a German geographer. She was the first woman to obtain a doctorate in geography.

== Life ==
According to Ginsburger, her doctorate was made possible by a favorable context and environment, at a time when women were not pursuing academic careers. Krug studied under Friedrich Ratzel at Leipzig University, a few years after Ellen Churchill Semple, the first known woman geography student in Germany. Krug met Alfred Hettner in Leipzig, who made her publish several articles on the teaching of geography in the German and American school systems, in the journal he founded in 1895, the Geographische Zeitschrift.

She obtained a doctorate in geography, in 1901 in Heidelberg, under the supervision of Alfred Hettner. In her thesis, Martha Krug examined how hydrographic charts are used to map ocean currents. In particular, she analyzed the extension of the Gulf Stream to the northeast, the North American current, in order to draw up a map of knowledge in the field of oceanography.

In 1901, Krug joined her fiancée zoologist, Karl Wilhelm Genthe, in Boston when he secured an assistant professorship at Trinity College in Connecticut. Their marriage is recorded in 1901 at Richmond County (Staten Island), New York, stating that he was born in Leipzig and she in Chemnitz.

In 1901, National Geographic magazine published a 14-page article she wrote on German geography. She then obtained a teaching position at the Beacon School in Hartford, Connecticut, a secondary school for young women where she taught geography.

She was an expert in school geography, in both countries; she established herself alongside Semple in the Association of American Geographers, and the International Congress of Geography in Washington.

At the 1904 International Geographical Congress in Washington, Martha Krug-Genthe was chosen to deliver the "Tribute", a speech commemorating Friedrich Ratzel, the most influential cultural geographer of that time. She also presented an article on “School geography in the United States” in the section devoted to geography and education, the only section open to women.

She is one of the 48 founding members of the AAG, the only woman alongside Ellen Churchill Semple, and also the only one of the 48 founders of the AAG present in Philadelphia to have a doctorate in geography.

Martha Krug-Genthe was named associate editor of the Bulletin of the American Geographical Society. This affiliation strengthened her professional credentials.

In 1907, the Bulletin of the American Geographical Society published her work Valley Towns of Connecticut. This is a regional study of the economic factors driving the evolution of Hartford's urban system as the preeminent center of the Connecticut River Valley.

In 1911, she returned to Germany, and retired.

Krug-Genthe had a short (a decade) but very visible career, at a very restrictive time for women. Ginsburger mentions that:

"we don't know if she had to go abroad to follow her husband and promote his career to the detriment of her own, or if she chose to give up a very hypothetical university post in Germany to invest herself in school geography which was the only option open to her, being little valued in Germany but booming in the United States. She found there an undeniable form of recognition, in an American field of study that was then much less prestigious than in Germany, but which valued the skills of this outsider and offered women a more favorable position, at least in pre-university education."
