= Geographische Zeitschrift =

- Discipline: Human geography
- Language: German

Publication details
- History: 1895–present
- Publisher: Franz Steiner Verlag (Germany)
- Frequency: Quarterly

Standard abbreviations
- ISO 4: Geogr. Z.

Indexing
- ISSN: 0016-7479

Links
- Journal homepage

The Geographische Zeitschrift (English: The Geographical Journal) is a German peer-reviewed academic journal specialising in human geography. It was established in 1895 and is now published by the Franz Steiner Verlag.
