= Ferdinand von Richthofen =

German explorer and scientist (1833–1905)

Freiherr Ferdinand von Richthofen
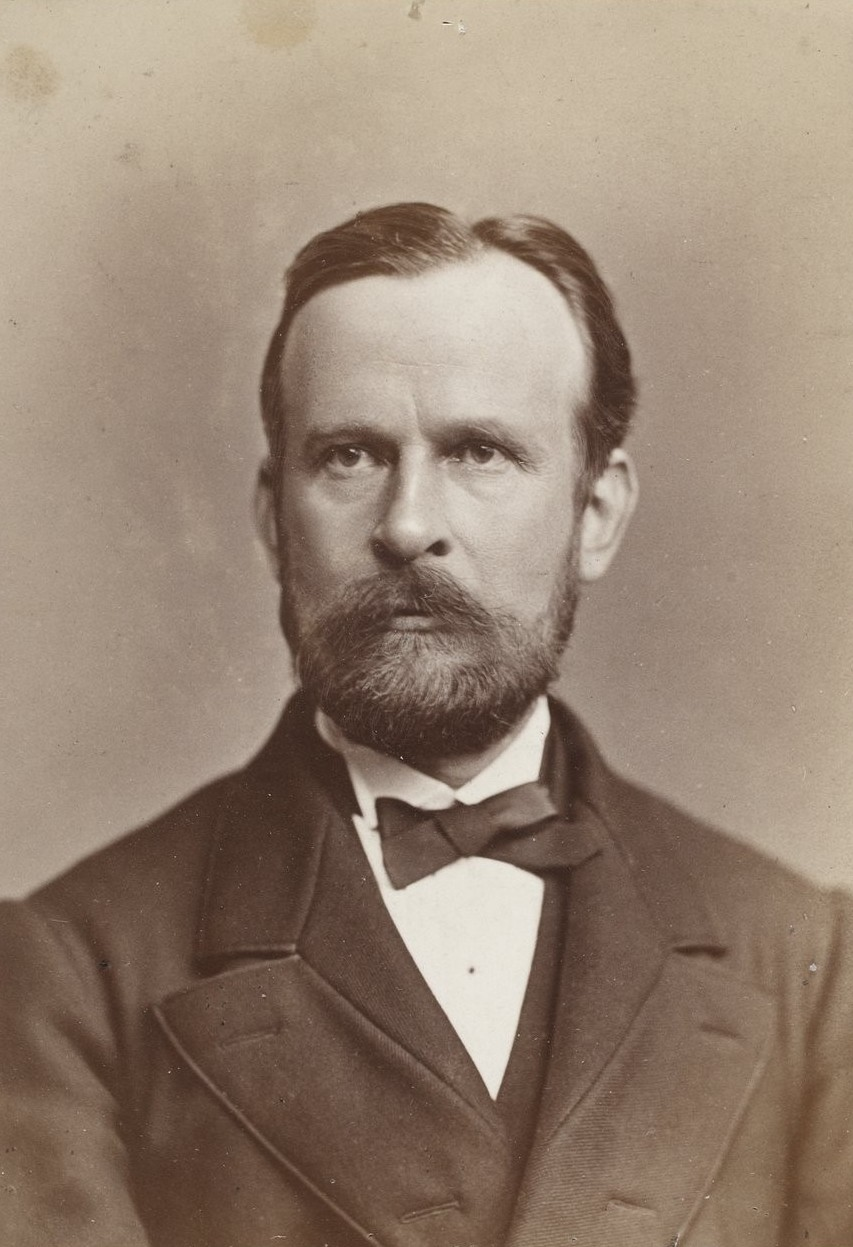
- Born: 5 May 1833; Carlsruhe, Prussian Silesia
- Died: 6 October 1905 (aged 72); Berlin, German Empire
- Education: University of Breslau; University of Berlin
- Awards: Wollaston Medal (1892); Vega Medal (1903)
- Scientific career
- Fields: Geography
- Workplaces: University of Bonn; University of Leipzig; University of Berlin
- Doctoral students: Sven Hedin; Alfred Philippson; Arthur Berson; Wilhelm Sievers

Ferdinand Freiherr von Richthofen (5 May 1833 – 6 October 1905), better known in English as Baron von Richthofen, was a German traveller, geographer, and scientist. He is noted for coining the terms "Seidenstraße" and "Seidenstraßen" = "Silk Road(s)" or "Silk Route(s)" in 1877. He also standardized the practices of chorography and chorology.

== Biography ==
Ferdinand von Richthofen was born in Pokój, at that time called Carlsruhe in Prussian Silesia. He was educated in the Roman Catholic Gymnasium in Breslau.

He studied medicine at the University of Breslau and at the Humboldt University of Berlin. He traveled or studied in the Alps of Tyrol and the Carpathians in Transylvania.

In 1860, he joined the Eulenburg Expedition, a Prussian expedition which visited Ceylon, Japan, Taiwan, Celebes, Java, the Philippines, Siam, Burma between 1860 and 1862. No important work resulted from these travels, for much of Richthofen's records and collections was lost. China was at the time inaccessible owing to the Taiping Rebellion, but Richthofen was impressed with the desirability of exploring it. From 1862 to 1868, he worked as a geologist in the United States, discovering goldfields in California. He then followed up his interest in mainland China by several more trips there, and also to Japan, Burma, and Java. In China he located the dried-up lake bed of Lopnur.

He published his geographical, geological, economic, and ethnological findings in three volumes with an atlas, which, however, did not cover the entire field or complete the author's plan. This work appeared at Berlin in 1877-85 under the title of China: Ergebnisse eigener Reisen und darauf gegründeter Studien. In this standard work, the author deals not only with geology but with every subject necessary to a general geographical treatise. Notably he paid close attention to the economic resources of the country he traversed. He also wrote a valuable series of letters to the Shanghai Chamber of Commerce, and first drew attention to the importance of the coalfields of China's Shandong province, and of Kiaochow (Jiaozhou) as a port.

Richthofen's travel in China from 1868 to 1872 helped to establish him as one of Germany's leading China experts in the next decade.

In 1875, he was appointed professor of geology at the University of Bonn, but being fully occupied with his work in China he did not take up professorial duties until 1879. In 1883, he became professor of geography at the University of Leipzig, and professor of geography at the Friedrich Wilhelm University of Berlin in 1886. He occupied the latter position until his death. His lectures attracted numerous students who subsequently became eminent in geographical work, and in order to keep in touch with them he established his weekly geographical “colloquium.” Among his most famous students was Sven Hedin, the Swedish explorer. He served as president of the German Geographical Society for many years and founded the Berlin Hydrographical Institute.

He is noted for coining the terms "Seidenstraße" and "Seidenstraßen" = "Silk Road(s)" or "Silk Route(s)" in 1877. He also standardized the practices of chorography and chorology.

He died in 1905 in Berlin and was entombed in the family mausoleum at the Stahnsdorf South-Western Cemetery.

== Anecdotes ==
When William Gill consulted him about a planned trip to China, he remarked:

Hour after hour he gave up his valuable time to me, and opened volumes from his rich store of information. … Baron von Richthofen possesses in a remarkable manner the faculty of gathering up the details presented to his view; putting them together and generalising on them with rare judgement; forming out of what would be to a lesser genius, but scattered and unintelligible fragments, a uniform and comprehensive whole … not one hint was given me that did not subsequently prove its value; his kind thoughts for my comfort and amusement were never ceasing, and his refined and cultivated intellect and genial manner rendered the recollections of my stay in the German capital some of the most pleasant of my life.

The mountain range on the southern edge of the Hexi Corridor in western China was named Richthofen Range after him by Europeans, although the modern name is now Qilian Mountains. The 12940 ft. Mount Richthofen in Rocky Mountain National Park is also named after him.

== Publications ==
=== In German ===
- “Die Kalkalpen von Vorarlberg und Nordtirol” in Jahrbuch der geologischen Reichsanstalt; 1859–1861
- “Die Metallproduktion Kaliforniens” in Petermanns Mitteilungen; 1865
- China, Ergebnisse eigner Reisen und darauf gegründeter Studien (China: The results of my travels and the studies based thereon), 1877–1912, 5 vols. and atlas
- Aufgaben und Methoden der heutigen Geographie (an address delivered at Leipzig, 1883)
- Führer für Forschungsreisende (A guide for the traveling researcher), Berlin, 1886
- Triebkräfte und Richtungen der Erdkunde in neunzehnten Jahrhundert (address on his election as rector, Berlin, 1903)

=== In English ===
- Comstock Lode: Its Character, and the Probable Mode of Its Continuance in Depth (1866)
- Principles of the Natural System of Volcanic Rocks (1867)
- Letters to the Shanghai Chamber of Commerce (1869–72)
- Richthofen, F. (1872). Letter from Baron Richthofen on the Province of Hunan. Shanghai: Re-printed at the "Ching-foong" Printing Office. State Library of New South Wales, TQ047868
- Richthofen, F. (1872). Letter by Baron von Richthofen on the provinces of Chili, Shansi, Shensi, Sz'-chwan, with notes on Mongolia, Kansu, Yünnan and Kwei-chau. no. 7. Shanghai: Re-printed at the "Ching-foong" Printing Office. State Library of New South Wales, TQ047868
- Richthofen, F. (1872). Letter by Baron von Richthofen, from Si-ngan-fu, on the rebellion in Kansu and Shensi. No. 6. Shanghai: Printed at the office of the 'North-China Herald'. State Library of New South Wales, TQ047868
