= Friedrich Ratzel =

German geographer and ethnographer (1844–1904)

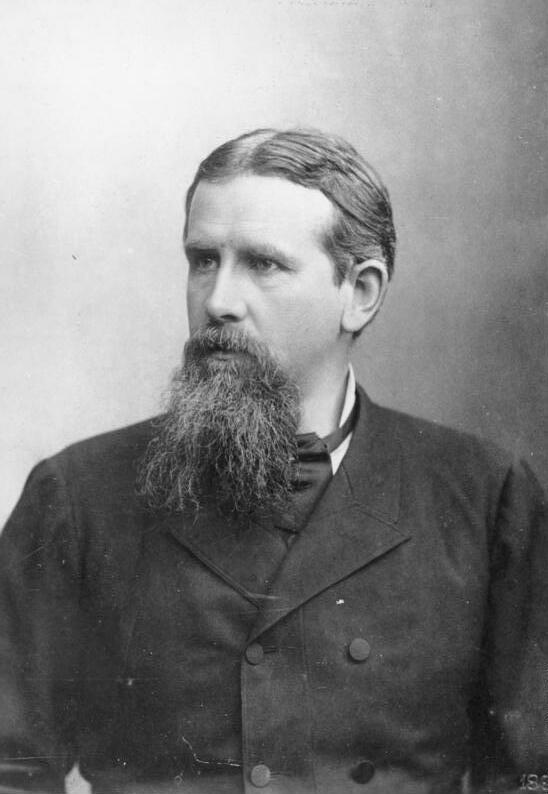
- Friedrich Ratzel
- Born: 30 August 1844; Karlsruhe, Baden
- Died: 9 August 1904 (aged 59); Ammerland, Lake Starnberg, Bavaria, German Empire
- Education: University of Heidelberg; University of Jena; Humboldt University of Berlin
- Known for: Concept of Lebensraum
- Scientific career
- Fields: Geography; Ethnography
- Workplaces: Leipzig University

Friedrich Ratzel (German pronunciation: [ˈfʁiːdʁɪç ˈʁatsl̩]; 30 August 1844 – 9 August 1904) was a German geographer and ethnographer, notable for first using the term Lebensraum (lit. 'living space') in the sense that the Nazis later would.

== Life ==
Ratzel's father was the head of the household staff of the Grand Duke of Baden. Friedrich attended high school in Karlsruhe for six years before being apprenticed at age 15 to apothecaries. In 1863, he went to Rapperswil on the Lake of Zurich, Switzerland, where he began to study the classics. After a further year as an apothecary at Moers near Krefeld in the Lower Rhine region (1865–1866), he spent a short time at the high school in Karlsruhe and became a student of zoology at the universities of Heidelberg, Jena and Berlin, finishing in 1868. He studied zoology in 1869, publishing Sein und Werden der organischen Welt on Darwin.

After the completion of his schooling Ratzel began a period of travels that saw him transform from zoologist/biologist to geographer. He began field work in the Mediterranean, writing letters of his experiences. These letters led to a job as a traveling reporter for the Kölnische Zeitung ("Cologne Journal"), which provided him the means for further travel. Ratzel embarked on several expeditions, the lengthiest and most important being his 1874-1875 trip to North America and Cuba. This trip was a turning point in Ratzel's career. He studied the influence of people of German origin in the United States, especially in the Midwest, as well as other ethnic groups in North America.

He produced a written account of his travels in 1876, Städte-und Kulturbilder aus Nordamerika (Profile of Cities and Cultures in North America), which would help establish the field of cultural geography. According to Ratzel, cities are the best place to study people because life is "blended, compressed, and accelerated" in cities, and they bring out the "greatest, best, most typical aspects of people". Ratzel had traveled to cities such as New York, Boston, Philadelphia, Washington, Richmond, Charleston, New Orleans, and San Francisco.

Upon his return in 1875, Ratzel became a lecturer in geography at the Technical High School in Munich. In 1876, he was promoted to assistant professor, then rose to full professor in 1880. While at Munich, Ratzel produced several books and established his career as an academic. In 1886, he accepted an appointment at Leipzig University. His lectures were widely attended, notably by the influential American geographer Ellen Churchill Semple as well as Martha Krug-Genthe, the first woman to obtain a doctorate in geography.

Ratzel produced the foundations of human geography in his two-volume Anthropogeographie in 1882 and 1891. This work was misinterpreted by many of his students, creating a number of environmental determinists. He published his work on political geography, Politische Geographie, in 1897. It was in this work that Ratzel introduced concepts that contributed to Lebensraum and Social Darwinism. His three volume work The History of Mankind was published in English in 1896 and contained over 1100 excellent engravings and remarkable chromolithography.

Ratzel continued his work at Leipzig until his sudden death on 9 August 1904, in Ammerland, Lake Starnberg, Germany. Ratzel, a scholar of versatile academic interest, was a staunch German. During the outbreak of Franco-Prussian War in 1870, he joined the Prussian army and was wounded twice during the war.

== Writings ==
Influenced by thinkers including Darwin and zoologist Ernst Heinrich Haeckel, he published several papers. Among them is the essay Lebensraum (1901) concerning biogeography, creating a foundation for the uniquely German variant of geopolitics (Geopolitik). In Germany human geography was defined as environmental determinism, where landscape and climate produced the social and cultural organization of humans. Halford Mackinder moved on and attempted to map heartlands in the global geopolitical space, but focused on Great Britain, Germany, and Russia. The debate on Marxist geography is not over, with prominent geographers responding to demands for "urban theory without an outside".

Ratzel's writings coincided with the growth of German industrialism after the Franco-Prussian War and the subsequent search for markets that brought it into competition with Britain. His writings served as welcome justification for imperial expansion. Influenced by the American geostrategist Alfred Thayer Mahan, Ratzel wrote of aspirations for German naval reach, agreeing that sea power was self-sustaining, as the profit from trade would pay for the merchant marine, unlike land power.

Ratzel's idea of Raum (space) would grow out of his organic state conception. His early concept of lebensraum was not political or economic but spiritual and racial nationalist expansion. The Raum-motiv is a historically-driving force, pushing peoples with great Kultur to naturally expand. Space, for Ratzel, was a vague concept, theoretically unbounded. Raum was defined as where German peoples live, and other weaker states could serve to support German peoples economically, and German culture could fertilize other cultures. However, it ought to be noted that Ratzel's concept of Raum was not overtly aggressive, but he theorized simply as the natural expansion of strong states into areas controlled by weaker states.

The book for which Ratzel is acknowledged all over the world is Anthropogeographie. It was completed between 1872 and 1899. The main focus of this monumental work is on the effects of different physical features and locations on the style and life of the people.

== Quotations ==
- "Der Grenzraum ist das Wirkliche, die Grenzlinie ist das Abstraktion davon" (The borderlands are the reality, the boundary line is an abstraction thereof). (Ratzel, 1895)
- "A philosophy of the history of the human race, worthy of its name, must begin with the heavens and descend to the earth, must be charged with the conviction that all existence is one—a single conception sustained from beginning to end upon one identical law."
- "Culture grows in places that can adequately support dense labor populations."

== Selected bibliography ==
Here are his other notable writings:

- Wandertage eines Naturforschers (Days of wandering of a student of nature, 1873–74)
- Vorgeschichte des europäischen Menschen (Prehistory of Europeans, 1875)
- Die Vereinigten Staaten von Nordamerika (The United States of North America, 1878–80)
- Die Erde, in 24 Vorträgen (The Earth in 24 lectures, 1881)
- Völkerkunde (Ethnology, 1885,1886,1888)
- Der Staat und sein Boden
- Politische Geographie, (Political Geography, 1897)
- Die Erde und das Leben (The Earth and life, 1902)

== See also ==
- Carl Ritter

== Sources ==
- Gilman, D. C.; Peck, H. T.; Colby, F. M., eds. (1905). "Ratzel, Friedrich" . New International Encyclopedia (1st ed.). New York: Dodd, Mead.
