= Chorology =

Study of geographic causal relationships

Distribution map of European beech (Fagus sylvatica) : historical range, current range, and occasional observations.

Chorology (from Greek χῶρος, khōros, "place, space"; and -λογία, -logia) can mean

- the study of the causal relations between geographical phenomena occurring within a particular region
- the study of the spatial distribution of organisms (biogeography).

== Use ==
The Greek geographer, Strabo (64 or 63 BC – 24AD) wrote in his work Geographica that a geographer is "the person who attempts to describe the parts of the earth" (in Greek, chorographein).

In the twentieth century, German geographer Alfred Hettner used the term:

The goal of the chorological point of view is to know the character of regions and places through comprehension of the existence together and interrelations among different realms of reality and their varied manifestations, and to comprehend the earth surface as a whole in its actual arrangement in continents, larger and smaller regions, and places.

— Alfred Hettner

Distribution map of holly oak (Quercus ilex, natural and introduced range) and holm oak (Quercus rotundifolia, current range).

In the US, Richard Hartshorne worked on the notion again.

The term was popularized by Ferdinand von Richthofen.

== See also ==
- Chorography
- Khôra
