= Chorography =

Text describing the history and geography of a country or landscape

Chorography (Note: IPA: /kəˈrɒgrəfi/; less commonly called chorographia in English.) (Ancient Greek: χωρογραφία, romanized: khōrographía, from χώρᾱ khṓrā, "place", and γράφειν gráphein, "to write") is the art of describing or mapping a region or district, and by extension such a description or map. This term derives from the writings of the ancient geographers Pomponius Mela and Ptolemy, where it meant the geographical description of regions. However, its resonances of meaning have varied at different times. Richard Helgerson states that "chorography defines itself by opposition to chronicle. It is the genre devoted to place, and chronicle is the genre devoted to time". Darrell Rohl prefers a broad definition of "the representation of space or place". The description can address geographical, sociopolitical, or cultural aspects of a particular land. The scholarly site for rhetorical terms and usage, Silva Rhetoricae, defines chorographia as "...[t]he description of a particular nation". Chorographia is a type of enargia, which is a rhetorical term for vivid, visual description. Enargia is used in many forms and has several sub-categories such as: Topographia, Geographia, Hydrographia, etc. It is possible to conclude that chorographia not only describes a land, but works as a rhetorical tool during the invention canon of rhetoric. Chorographia is visual as well as textual. A depiction of a national or geographical landmark is an example of chorographia, whether the depiction is photographic or textual in nature.

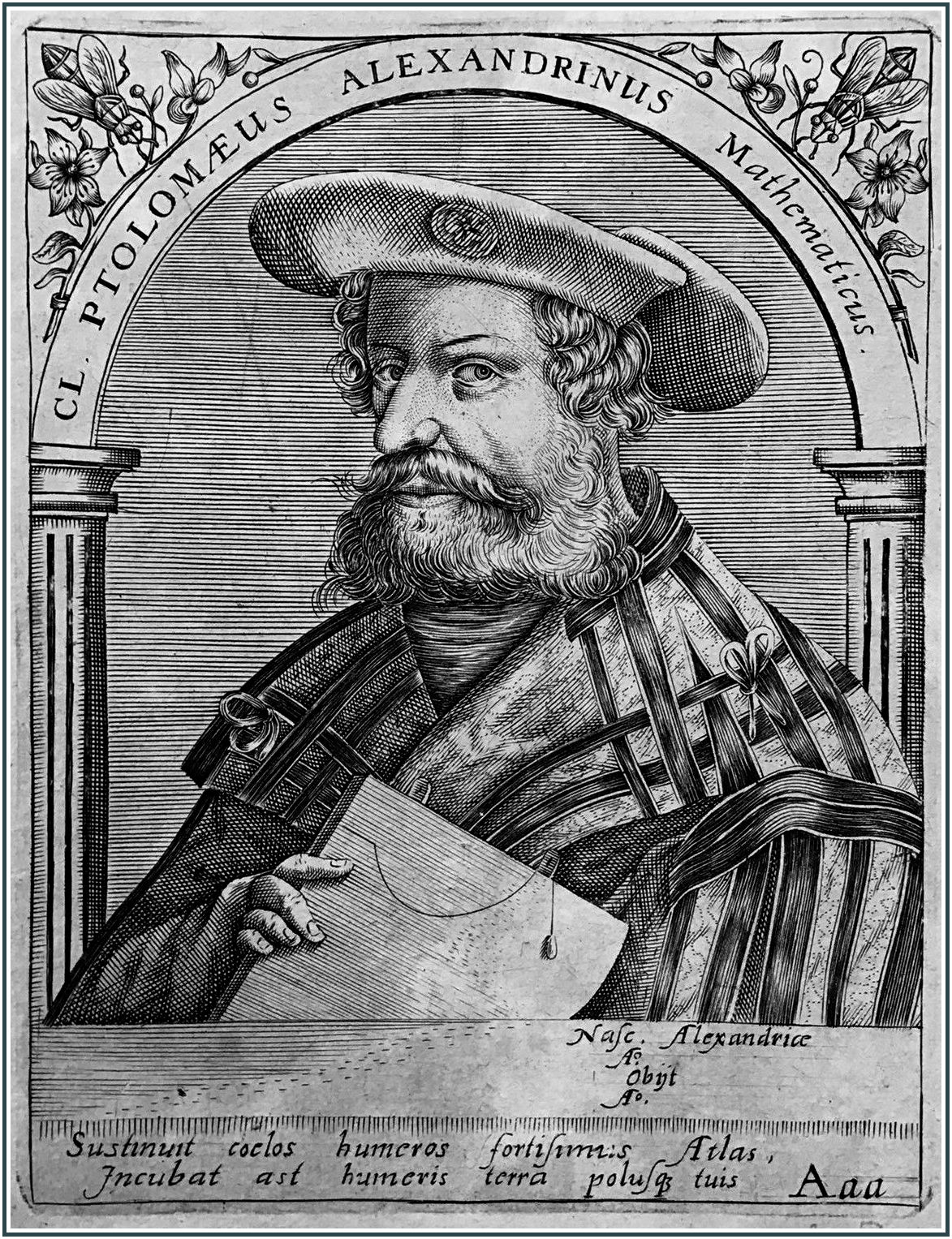
Ptolemy as imagined by a 16th-century artist

== Ptolemy's definition ==
In his text of the Geographia (2nd century CE), Ptolemy defined geography as the study of the entire world, but chorography as the study of its smaller parts—provinces, regions, cities, or ports. Its goal was "an impression of a part, as when one makes an image of just an ear or an eye"; and it dealt with "the qualities rather than the quantities of the things that it sets down". Ptolemy implied that it was a graphic technique, comprising the making of views (not simply maps), since he claimed that it required the skills of a draftsman or landscape artist, rather than the more technical skills of recording "proportional placements". Ptolemy's most recent English translators, however, render the term as "regional cartography".

== Renaissance revival ==
Ptolemy's text was rediscovered in the West at the beginning of the fifteenth century, and the term "chorography" was revived by humanist scholars. (Note: For example, by Lucia Nuti.) John Dee in 1570 regarded the practice as "an underling, and a twig of Geographie", by which the "plat" [plan or drawing] of a particular place would be exhibited to the eye.

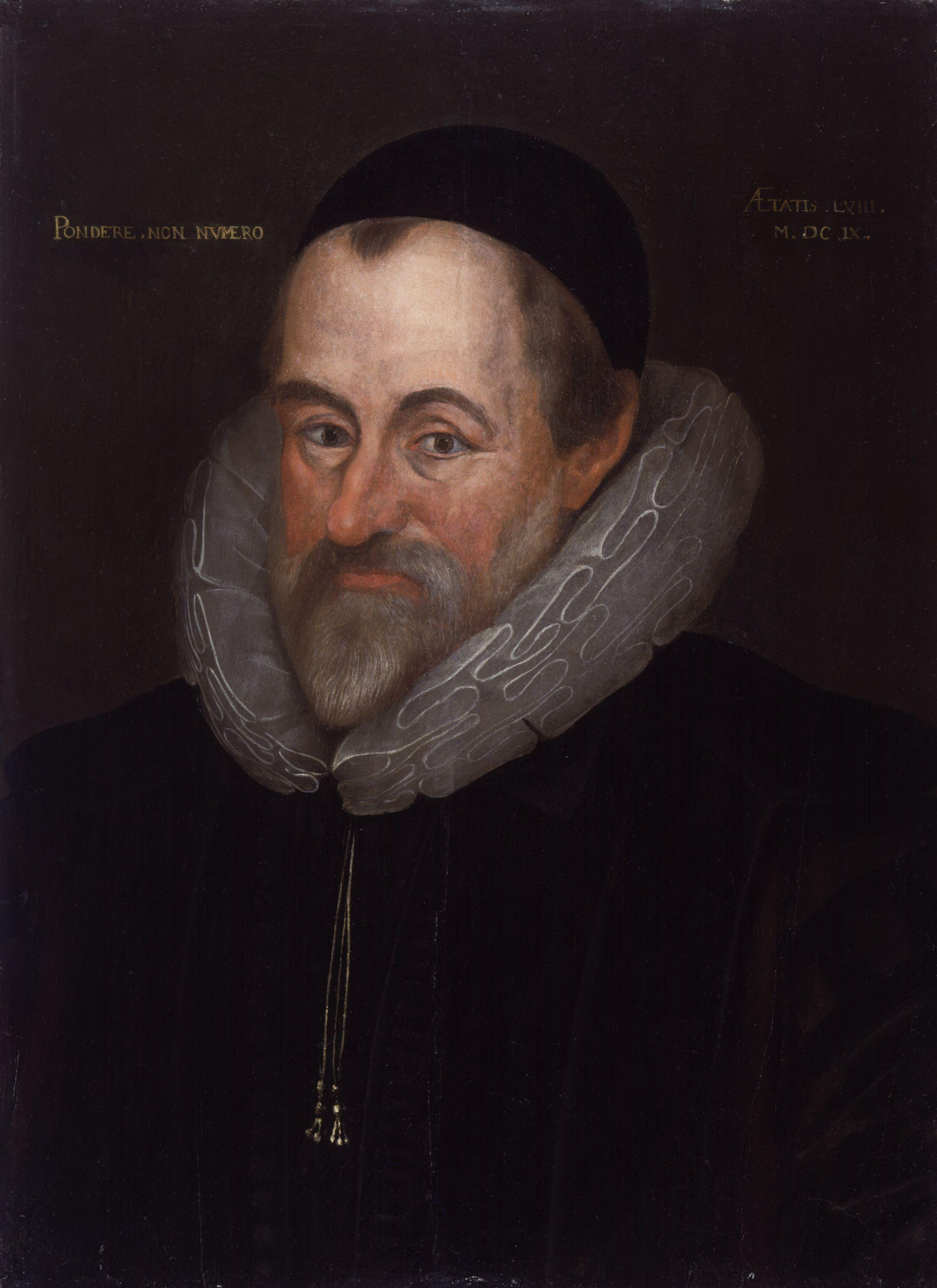
William Camden

The term also came to be used, however, for written descriptions of regions. These regions were extensively visited by the writer, who then combined local topographical description, summaries of the historical sources, and local knowledge and stories, into a text. The most influential example (at least in Britain) was probably William Camden's Britannia (first edition 1586), which described itself on its title page as a Chorographica descriptio. William Harrison in 1587 similarly described his own "Description of Britaine" as an exercise in chorography, distinguishing it from the historical/chronological text of Holinshed's Chronicles (to which the "Description" formed an introductory section). Peter Heylin in 1652 defined chorography as "the exact description of some Kingdom, Countrey, or particular Province of the same", and gave as examples Pausanias's Description of Greece (2nd century AD); Camden's Britannia (1586); Lodovico Guicciardini's Descrittione di tutti i Paesi Bassi (1567) (on the Low Countries); and Leandro Alberti's Descrizione d'Italia (1550).

Camden's Britannia was predominantly concerned with the history and antiquities of Britain, and, probably as a result, the term chorography in English came to be particularly associated with antiquarian texts. William Lambarde, John Stow, John Hooker, Michael Drayton, Tristram Risdon, John Aubrey and many others used it in this way, arising from a gentlemanly topophilia and a sense of service to one's county or city, until it was eventually often applied to the genre of county history. A late example was William Grey's Chorographia (1649), a survey of the antiquities of the city of Newcastle upon Tyne. Even before Camden's work appeared, Andrew Melville in 1574 had referred to chorography and chronology as the "twa lights" [two lights] of history.

The following two examples of chorography are excerpts from Álvar Núñez Cabeza de Vaca's book, Castaways:

The land is level for the most part, from the place where we disembarked to this town and land of Apalachee; the ground is sand and also loam, everywhere there are large trees and clearings in which there are walnut trees and bay trees and others of the kind called gum trees...

[The people of the nation] wore their hair loose and very long and were covered in cloaks made of sable skins...

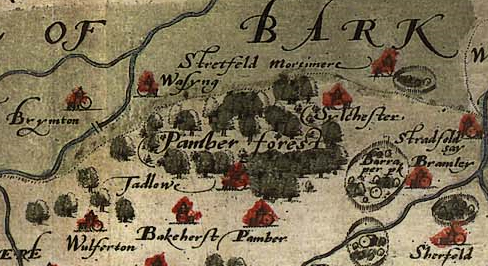
Example of Christopher Saxton's cartography

However, the term also continued to be used for maps and map-making, particularly of sub-national or county areas. William Camden praised the county mapmakers Christopher Saxton and John Norden as "most skilfull (sic) Chorographers"; and Robert Plot in 1677 and Christopher Packe in 1743 both referred to their county maps as chorographies.

By the beginning of the eighteenth century the term had largely fallen out of use in all these contexts, being superseded for most purposes by either "topography" or "cartography". Samuel Johnson in his Dictionary (1755) made a distinction between geography, chorography and topography, arguing that geography dealt with large areas, topography with small areas, but chorography with intermediate areas, being "less in its object than geography, and greater than topography". In practice, however, the term is only rarely found in English by this date.

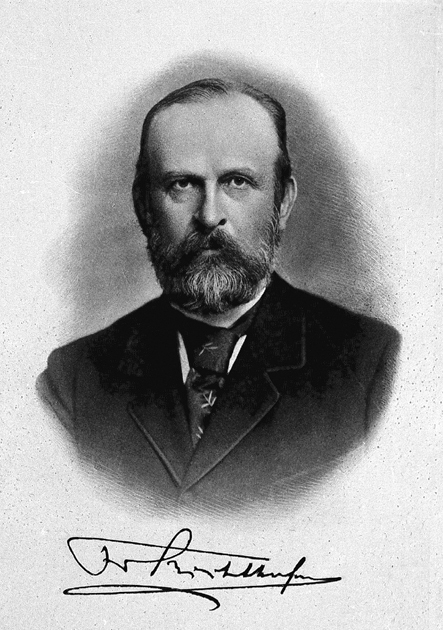
Ferdinand von Richthofen

== Modern usages ==
In more technical geographical literature, the term had been abandoned as city views and city maps became more and more sophisticated and demanded a set of skills that required not only skilled draftsmanship but also some knowledge of scientific surveying. However, its use was revived for a second time in the late nineteenth century by the geographer Ferdinand von Richthofen. He regarded chorography as a specialization within geography, comprising the description through field observation of the particular traits of a given area.

The term is also now widely used by historians and literary scholars to refer to the early modern genre of topographical and antiquarian literature.

== See also ==
- Local history
- Antiquarianism
- Cartography
- Khôra
- Chorology
- English county histories
- Regional geography

== Sources ==
- Helgerson, Richard (1992). Forms of Nationhood: the Elizabethan Writing of England. Chicago: University of Chicago Press. ISBN 0-226-32633-0.
- Kinloch, G. R., ed. (1829). The Diary of Mr James Melvill, 1556–1601. Edinburgh: Bannatyne Club.
- Nuti, Lucia (1999). "Mapping Places: chorography and vision in the Renaissance". In Cosgrove, Denis (ed.). Mappings. London.
- Plot, Robert (1677). The Natural History of Oxford-shire. Oxford.
- Rohl, Darrell J. (2011). "The Chorographic Tradition and Seventeenth- and Eighteenth-Century Scottish Antiquaries" (PDF). Journal of Art Historiography. 5.
