= Sabine Hettner =

French modernist painter

Sabine Hettner (4 October 1907 in Florence – October 1985 in Paris) was a French modernist painter.

== Life ==
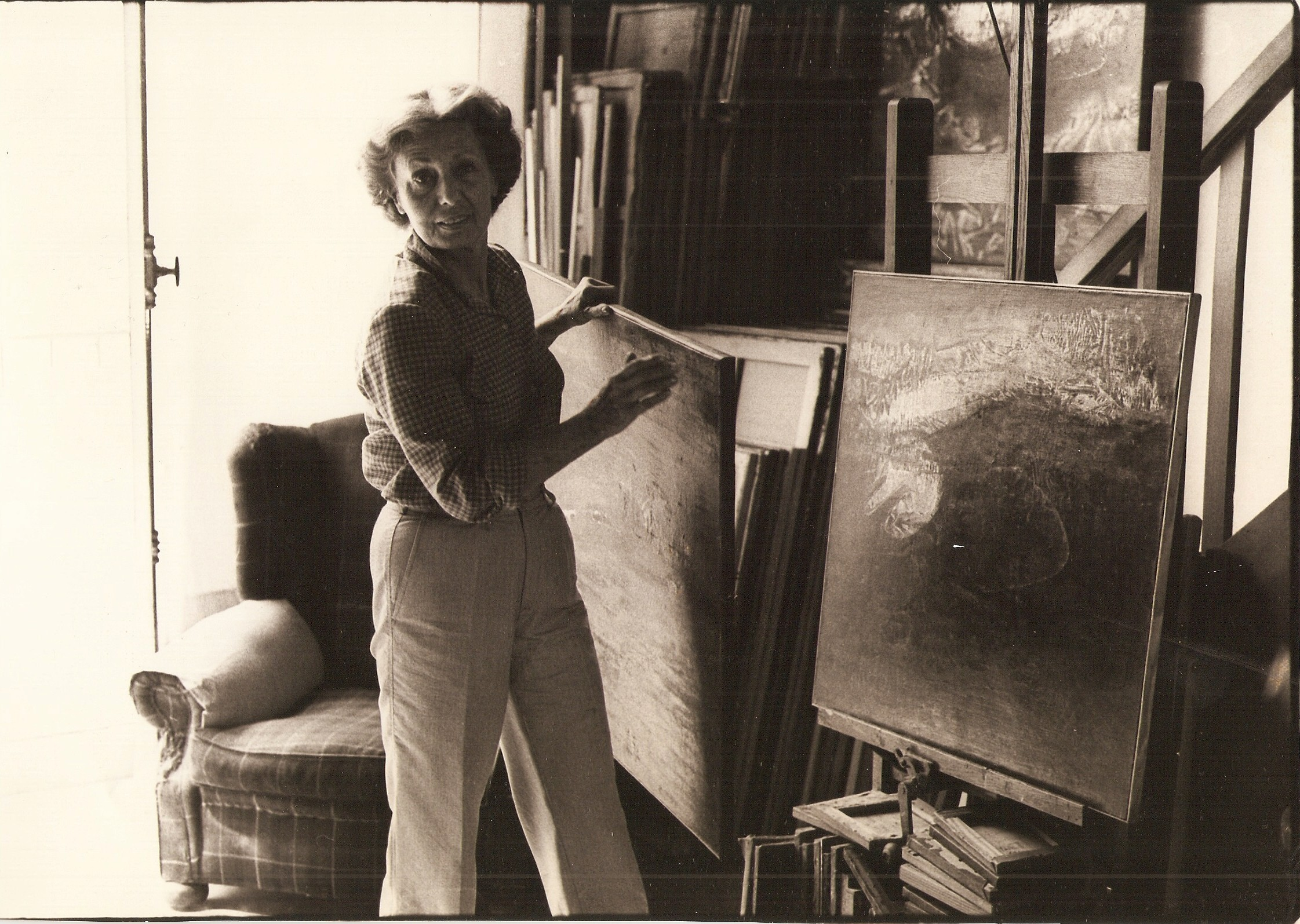
Sabine Hettner in her studio in Paris

Sabine Hettner started painting as a child, largely acquiring her artistic and technical skills through her father Otto Hettner and his friends Oskar Kokoschka and Otto Dix, who were all professors at the Dresden Art Academy. Her older brother Roland Hettner was a student of Otto Dix, and was a painter and ceramist in Italy. Her mother was from France; Sabine Hettner spent most of her life in Paris. She was the godchild of Gerhart Hauptmann.

During the German occupation of France during World War II Sabine Hettner married a French Jew who took her name and thus escaped persecution by the Nazis. The marriage ended after the war, and Hettner received from him a lifelong right to live in a studio in the Parisian district of Saint-Germain-des-Prés on the Rue de Saint-Simon, where she lived until the end of her life. She was friends there with the painters Sonia and Robert Delaunay, who lived in the same house.

Starting 1946 she exhibited regularly in France, and also in Italy, Spain, Denmark, England, and the USA. In Germany she exhibited in the Museum für Völkerkunde Hamburg (1960), in Gronau-Epe (1980, 1983) and in the Salon for Abstract Art Hamburg (1981).

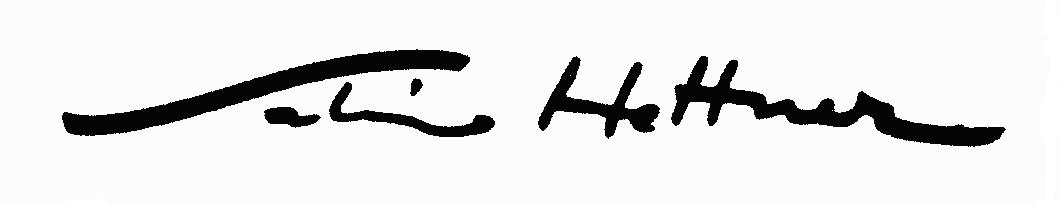
Signature

Sabine Hettner created numerous works (oil, gouaches, drawings). After a short figurative period, she oriented herself towards the abstraction of the universe, such as the sea, earth, sky and the world of minerals. Her pictures point to a pantheistic communion with nature, in a world shaped by mysticism.

Her pictures have no titles. She began to sign pictures with "S. Hettner" after an incident of sexism with Pablo Picasso when she signed her work with the full name "Sabine Hettner." When he saw her work he was enthusiastic about her pictures, but at the first meeting he noticed that "the artist" was a woman and lost interest.
