= Otto Hettner =

German painter

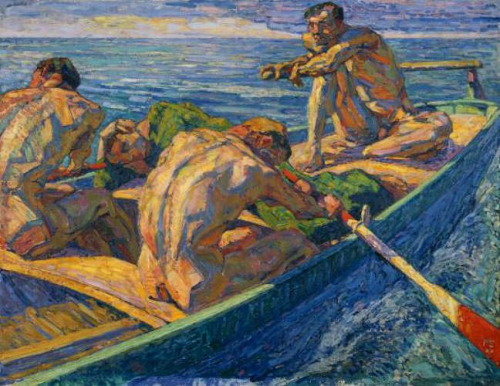
Otto Hettner, Rowers (n.d.)

Hermann Otto Hettner (27 January 1875, in Dresden – 19 April 1931, in Dresden) was a German painter, illustrator, engraver, and sculptor, and a professor at the Dresden Academy of Fine Arts.

== Life ==
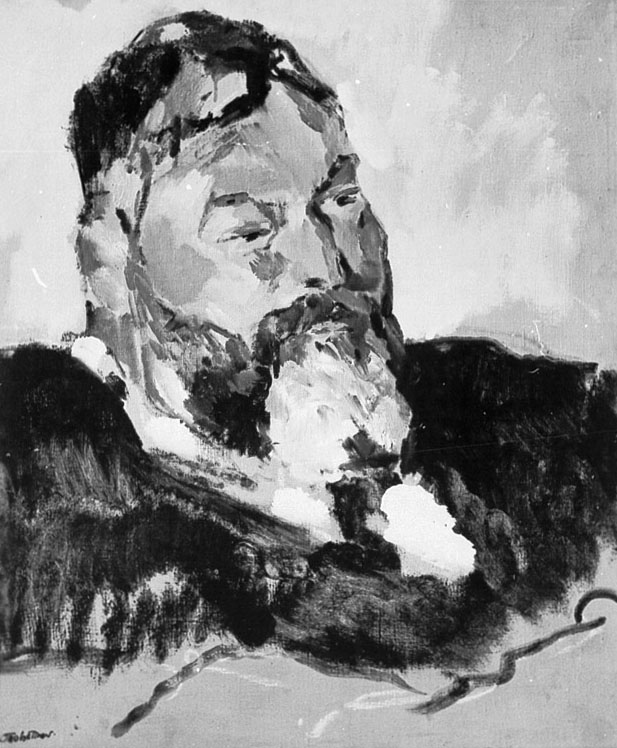
Otto Hettner, Portrait of Theodor Däubler (n.d.)

Otto Hettner was the son of the literary historian Hermann Theodor Hettner (1821–1882) and Anna Hettner (1838–1897), the oldest daughter of German painter August Grahl.

At the turn of the century, between 1897 and 1904, Hettner studied at the Academy of Fine Arts, Karlsruhe, with Robert Pötzelberger, and at the Académie Julian in Paris.

From 1904 to 1911, Hettner lived in Florence, where Jeanne Alexandrine Thibert (1878–1958) gave birth to his son Roland Hettner (1905–1978) on 26 October 1905. Roland later worked as an illustrator. In May 1907, Otto Hettner married Jeanne Thibert (1878–1958), a French woman, in London. Shortly thereafter, their daughter Sabine Hettner was born. As an adult, Sabine became a noted painter of landscapes and portraits.

With his family, Hettner returned to Dresden in 1913 and studied at the Dresden Academy of Fine Arts. In 1916 he became a member of the executive committee of the Free Secession, and the next year he became the director of the Dresden Academy of Fine Arts, where he worked as a professor and president from 1918 to 1927.

Hettner illustrated various books for renowned publishers of the time, including Avalun-Verlag, Marees-Gesellschaft, and Pan-Presse. Among his lithographic works are Hugo von Hofmannsthal’s Florindo and Miguel de Cervantes’s La Galatea (Avalun-Verlag) and Heinrich von Kleist’s The Earthquake in Chile (Pan-Presse).

== Notable works ==
- Hofmannsthal, Hugo von. Florindo. Vienna: Avalun-Verlag, 1923. (illustrated by Hettner)
- Longus. Daphnis und Chloe. Munich: Buchenau & Reichert, 1923. (illustrated by Hettner)
