= Fred K. Schaefer =

Fred Kurt Schaefer (July 7, 1904 – June 6, 1953) was a geographer. He is considered one of the pioneers of quantitative revolution.

Kurt Schaefer was a whole man, a conscious member of the human race, a scientist, and an intellectual who remembered his humanist commitment.

— William Bunge 1968

== Life ==
Fred K. Schaefer was born in Berlin, Germany in the family of metal worker. He was involved in politics as a member of Social Democratic party and after the rise of fascism he fled from Nazi Germany. He attended the University of Berlin pursuing both undergraduate and postgraduate studies from 1928 through 1932. As an undergraduate he studied economics, economic geography, and political geography. As a graduate student he studied mathematics and population statistics.

Later in the United States he became an inaugural member of the Department of Geography at Iowa.

In 1947 he married Mary Strub, a native of Iowa City. He died of a heart attack on June 6, 1953.

== Works ==
He is well known for his article in flagship American periodical, Annals, Association of American Geographers called Exceptionalism in geography: A Methodological Examination It was both a repudiation of Richard Hartshorne's position in United States, and a call for a scientific approach to geography based upon the search for geographical laws (the ultimate form of a scientific generalization). Schaefer died before his article even appeared in print, and so he was never able to elaborate his argument, nor defend himself from Hartshorne's subsequent critique. But the article became a rallying point for the younger generation of economic geographers who were intent on reinventing the discipline as a science, or spatial science as it was later dubbed. The subject has now been revived by economists under the umbrella of the new economic geography.

== Other sources ==
Schaefer's papers were donated to the American Geographical Society by his wife, Mary Strub Schaefer. They include at least two unpublished manuscripts by Schaefer, “Political Geography,” and “The Nature of Geography.”.
