= Richard Hartshorne =

American geographer (1899–1992)

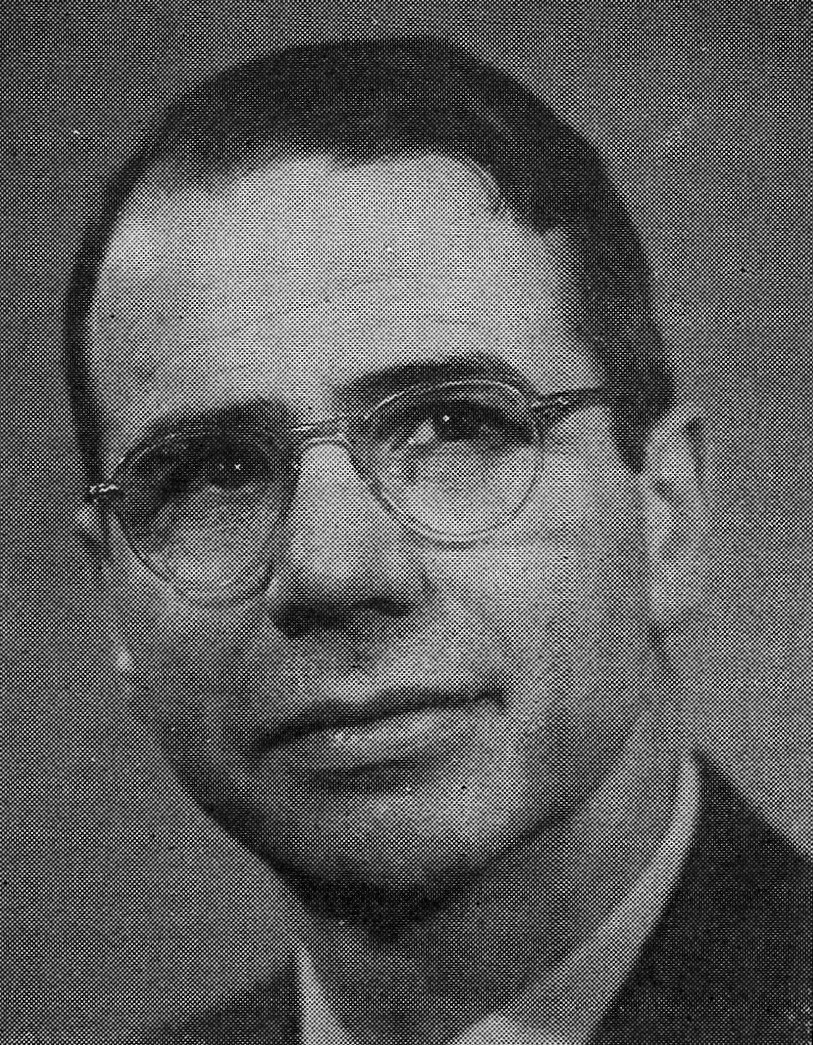
Portrait of Richard Hartshorne

Richard Hartshorne (/ˈhɑːrtshɔːrn/; December 12, 1899 – November 5, 1992) was a prominent American geographer, and professor at the University of Wisconsin-Madison, who specialized in economic and political geography and the philosophy of geography. He is known in particular for his methodological work The Nature of Geography, published in 1939.

== Biography ==
Born in Kittanning, Pennsylvania, Hartshorne completed his undergraduate studies at Princeton University in 1920, and his doctorate at the University of Chicago in 1924. His dissertation was titled The Lake traffic of Chicago.

Hartshorne taught at the University of Minnesota from 1924 to 1940, and at the University of Wisconsin-Madison from 1945 to 1970. In the war-time interruption from 1941 to 1945 he established and ran the Geography Division in the branch of Research and Analysis of the Office of Strategic Services (OSS).

Hartshorne was president of the Association of American Geographers in 1949. The association gave him its top award in 1960. He was also awarded a Doctor of Laws (honoris causa) from Clark University, April 17, 1971, and the Victoria medal from the Royal Geographical Society in 1984.

He died of cancer at his home in Madison, Wisconsin. Among his brothers was the prominent American philosopher Charles Hartshorne.It also Takes Note Of the Association and Inter-Relationship between the Phenomenon Resuliting from the Dynamic Interaction between Human beings and their Physical Environment.

== Work ==
Hartshorne's 1939 book The Nature of Geography: A Critical Survey of Current Thought in the Light of the Past, reflected his concern that geographers, as scientists and scholars, should familiarize themselves with, and take account of, past work in their field. The book itself became a standard in the field and remained in print for decades; the seventh edition was published in 2000. The German geographer Alfred Hettner ((1859-1941) had a significant impact on Hartshorne's The Nature of Geography.

In the 1950s Hartshorne was part of a key geographical debate over the nature of the subject. Fred K. Schaefer called for the adoption of the 'scientific method' and study of spatial laws and criticised the 'old method' promoted by Hartshorne as the 'Hartshornian orthodoxy'.

His 1970 book The Academic Citizen: Selected Statements by Richard Hartshorne with introduction and notes by Mark Hoyt Ingraham, contains various statements on academic issues, authored (in some cases, co-authored) by Hartshorne, from the late 1940s through the 1960s, his pre-emeritus years at the University of Wisconsin.

== Publications ==
Books, a selection:

- 1939. The Nature of Geography: A Critical Survey of Current Thought in the Light of the Past
- 1959. Perspective on the Nature of Geography
- 1970. The Academic Citizen: Selected Statements by Richard Hartshorne. University of Wisconsin

Articles, a selection

- 1927. "Location as a Factor in Geography", Annals of the Association of American Geographers, Vol. 17, No. 2 (Jun., 1927), pp. 92–99
- 1933. "Geographic and Political Boundaries in Upper Silesia", Annals of the Association of American Geographers, Vol. 23, No. 4 (Dec., 1933), pp. 195–228.
- 1935. (and Samuel N. Dicken) "A Classification of the Agricultural Regions of Europe and North America on a Uniform Statistical Basis", Annals of the Association of American Geographers, Vol. 25, No. 2 (Jun., 1935), pp. 99–120.
- 1935. "Recent Developments in Political Geography, I", The American Political Science Review, Vol. 29, No. 5 (Oct., 1935), pp. 785–804.
- 1935. "Recent Developments in Political Geography, II", The American Political Science Review, Vol. 29, No. 6 (Dec., 1935), pp. 943–966.
- 1938. "Six Standard Seasons of the Year", Annals of the Association of American Geographers, Vol. 28, No. 3 (Sep., 1938), pp. 165–178.
- 1940. "The Concepts of 'Raison d'Être' and 'Maturity' of States; Illustrated from the Mid-Danube Area", Annals of the Association of American Geographers, vol. 30, pp. 59–60; 1940.
- 1941. "The Politico-Geographic Pattern of the World", Annals of the American Academy of Political and Social Science, Vol. 218, Public Policy in a World at War (Nov., 1941), pp. 45–57.
- 1958. "The Concept of Geography as a Science of Space, from Kant and Humboldt to Hettner", Annals of the Association of American Geographers, Vol. 48, No. 2 (Jun., 1958), pp. 97–108.
- 1960. "Political Geography in the Modern World", The Journal of Conflict Resolution, Vol. 4, No. 1, The Geography of Conflict (Mar., 1960), pp. 52–66.

== See also ==
- Geographers on Film
