= Maximilien Sorre =

French geographer (1880-1962)

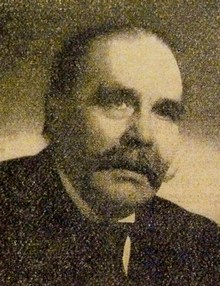
- Born: Maximilien Joseph Sorre; 16 July 1880; Rennes, Brittany, France
- Died: 10 August 1962 (aged 82); Messigny, Côte-d'Or, France
- Occupation: Geographer

Maximilien Sorre (16 July 1880 – 10 August 1962), known as Max Sorre, was a French geographer whose work was mainly in the areas of biological and human geography.

== Life ==
Maximilien Sorre, who signed his works "Max Sorre", was born in Rennes, Brittany, on 16 July 1880. He studied at the École Normale de Rennes. From 1899 to 1901 he studied at the École normale de Saint Cloud, which trained teachers for the departmental écoles normales. On 6 August 1901 he was awarded a certificate to teach as a professor at the Écoles Normales and the Écoles primaires supérieures. In 1902 he was appointed professor at the École Normale de La Roche-sur-Yon.

Sorre was appointed to Perpignan and then to Montpellier in 1903. He had already accepted the geographic views of Paul Vidal de La Blache and Emmanuel de Martonne. At the University of Montpellier he was taught by Charles Flahault, professor of botany. This course let him enroll in a doctorate under the direction of Paul Vidal de La Blache on a theme of biological geography in the eastern Pyrenees, a pioneering work he presented in 1913. His complementary thesis was entitled: "A critical study of the sources of the history of viticulture and the trade of wines and spirits in Lower Languedoc in the eighteenth century".

During World War I (1914–18) Sorre was mobilized as an officer in 1914, and was seriously wounded in Artois in the autumn of 1915. While convalescing he established a closer relationship with Vidal, whose son had been lost in the war. After the war he was accepted in turn by the universities of Bordeaux, Strasbourg and then Lille in 1922. After the death of Antoine Vacher in 1920 the teaching of geography at the University of Lille had been disorganized for two years. Sorre stayed at Lille for a long period, and in 1925 accepted the chair of Regional Geography there. In 1929 he was appointed Dean of the Faculty of Letters of Lille, holding that position for eleven years. He also held the posts of Rector of the Académie de Clermont (1931–34) and Rector of the Academy of Aix-Marseille (1934–37).

Sorre had left-wing views, and under the Popular Front he was named director of primary education by Jean Zay. He was director of Primary and Post-school Education from 2 June 1937. During World War II (1939–45) The Vichy Regime dismissed him from this position due to his political views, and he was returned to the Lille Faculty of Letters by a decree of 29 July 1940. In October 1940 Sorre was given the chair of Human Geography at the Sorbonne, where he ended his teaching career. At the end of his life Maximilien Sorre was President of the École Normale Supérieure in the rue d'Ulm, Paris. He died on 10 August 1962. The Lycée Maximilien Sorre in Cachan, Val-de-Marne, is named after him.

== Views ==
During the first half of the 20th century Maximilien Sorre developed the concepts that Paul Vidal de La Blache had laid out in his Principes de géographie humaine, adding concepts from the biological sciences and exploring the relations of man with his environment. Albert Demangeon had paved the way for more systematic conceptualizations of Social geography with his posthumously published argument that social groups ought to be within the center of human geographical analysis. That task was carried out by Pierre George and Maximilien Sorre, among others. Sorre was interested in the biological conditions of habitability of regions of the world, and the process of transfer of populations and cultures by international migrations. He was interested in the effect of epidemics and of changing environmental conditions. With this orientation he disregarded the dominant trends of post-war French geography.

== Appointments ==
- Assistant Secretary-General of the Société languedocienne de géographie (1906–1914)
- Assistant Secretary-General of the Société de géographie de Lille (1923–1929)
- Dean of the Faculty of Letters of Lille (1929–1931)
- Vice-president (1947–1953) then President (1953–1961) of the Comité national français de géographie (CNFG)
- Vice-president (1952–1960) of the International Geographical Union
- Vice-president of the Association de géographes français (AGF)
- Member of the Comité des travaux historiques et scientifiques (CTHS)
- Animator of the Société de biogéographie (Muséum national d'histoire naturelle)
- Director of the Annales de Géographie
- President (1952–1956) of both the Commission de géographie humaine and the Commission de biogéographie du CNFG.
- Director of the Centre d’études sociologiques (CNRS) (1951–56.

== Publications ==
Selected publications:

- Maximilien Sorre (1913), "Les Pyrénées méditerranéennes. Etude de géographie biologique", Nature (thesis), 91 (2286), Paris: Armand Colin: 508, Bibcode:1913Natur..91..632W, doi:10.1038/091632a0, S2CID 3949910
- Maximilien Sorre (1928), "L'organisme humain et le milieu géographique", Bulletin de la Société de Géographie de Lille: 108–122
- Maximilien Sorre (1933), "Complexes pathogènes et géographie médicale", Annales de Géographie, 42 (235): 1–18, doi:10.3406/geo.1933.10619
- Maximilien Sorre (1928), Mexique, Amérique centrale, Géographie Universelle, vol. 14, Paris: Armand Colin, p. 234
- Maximilien Sorre (1934), "1st part: généralités, Espagne, Portugal", Méditerranée. Péninsules méditerranéennes, Géographie Universelle, vol. 7, Paris, Armand Colin, p. 232
- Maximilien Sorre (1943–1952), Les fondements de la géographie humaine, vol. 1–3, Paris: Armand Colin
  - Maximilien Sorre (1943), Les fondements biologiques de la géographie humaine, vol. 1 : Essai d’une écologie de l’homme, p. 440
  - Maximilien Sorre (1947), Les fondements biologiques de la géographie humaine, vol. 1 : Essai d’une écologie de l’homme (2 ed.), p. 440
  - Maximilien Sorre (1950), Les fondements biologiques de la géographie humaine, vol. 2 : Les fondements techniques, p. 1031
  - Maximilien Sorre (1952), Les fondements biologiques de la géographie humaine, vol. 3 : L’habitat. Conclusion générale, p. 499
- Maximilien Sorre (1955), Les migrations des peuples. Essai sur la mobilité géographique, Paris: Flammarion, p. 267
- Maximilien Sorre (1957), Rencontres de la géographie et de la sociologie, Paris: Ed. Marcel Rivière, p. 213
- Maximilien Sorre (1961), L'Homme sur la Terre, Paris: Hachette, p. 365

== Sources ==
- Beaujeu-Garnier, J. (1963), "Maximilien Sorre (1880–1962)", L'Information géographique (in French), 27 (1)
- Condette, Jean-François (January 2001), "Les enseignants d'histoire et de géographie à la faculté des Lettres de Lille sous la Troisième République (1887–1940)", Revue du Nord, 339 (339): 65, doi:10.3917/rdn.339.0065
- Demangeon, Albert (1942), Problèmes de géographie humaine, Paris: Armand Colin
- Hérin, Robert (1984), "Social Geography in France – Heritages and Perspectives", GeoJournal, 9 (3), doi:10.1007/BF00149031, S2CID 140747434
- "Lycée Maximilien Sorre – Cachan", L'Express (in French)
- Tissier, Jean-Louis, "Maximilien Sorre", Hypergeo (in French)
- Werlen, Benno (2008), Sozialgeographie: Eine Einführung (in German) (3 ed.), Bern et al.: Haupt
