= Antoine Vacher =

French geographer

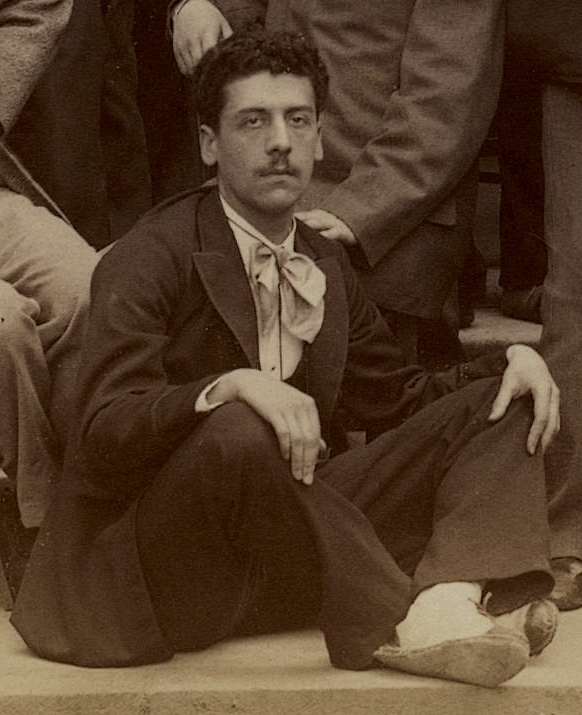
- Antoine Vacher, 1895
- Born: 18 November 1873; Montluçon, Allier, France
- Died: 16 September 1920 (aged 46); Paris, France
- Occupation: Geographer

Antoine Vacher (18 November 1873 – 16 September 1920) was a French geographer, mainly interested in physical geography, and particularly in hydrography.

== Early years (1873–1905) ==
Antoine Vacher was the brilliant son of a family of tailors from Montluçon, Allier. His paternal grandfather was a farmer in the Allier, while his maternal grandfather was a craftsman. His father experienced serious financial difficulties and had to go into debt to save his small business. Antoine Vacher was an honorary scholar at the Lycée de Lyon (1880), and a scholar at the Lycée Henri-IV in Paris (1891). He studied at the École Normale Supérieure (ENS). While at the ENS he had to work in various casual jobs during the summer holidays to help repay the family loans. He was a student of Paul Vidal de La Blache, but in his doctorate wrote almost exclusively about physical geography, and ignored human geography. Vacher's fieldwork was mostly concerned with valley forms and measurements of river flows, but he also read widely on oceanography, and wrote on that subject in the Annales de Géographie.

In his time at Lycée Henri-IV, Vacher studied under Henri Bergson, his lecture notes on the 1892-3 course on psychology have been published by PUF.

== Pre-war university career (1905–14) ==
In October 1905 he became a lecturer at the University of Rennes, replacing Emmanuel de Martonne, who had moved to the University of Lyon. De Martonne had founded the institute of geography on the German model. Vacher collaborated with Albert Demangeon, Joseph Blayac and others on the Dictionnaire-manuel illustré de géographie (Paris, Armand Colin, 1907). Vacher was an undisciplined scholar who missed deadlines and whose work often contains errors. The book received hostile reviews, and Demangeon seems to have accused Vacher of sabotaging the project. He later became a Docteur ès lettres in 1908. After Demangeon left (in 1911) he was the sole teacher, although not yet a professor.

Vacher was replaced by Henri Baulig when he left Rennes in 1912. He then taught at the University of Lille until the outbreak of World War I (1914–18). In 1912 Vacher was among 43 European geographers, guests of the American Geographical Society, who arrived in New York around 12 August 1912 for a transcontinental excursion. The geographers travelled west via Chicago and Yellowstone to Seattle, south to San Francisco, then returned via Phoenix, Denver, Memphis and Washington, leaving from New York in October 1912. Vacher focused on "Steppes and deserts" in his report of the excursion. He was impressed by the way in which the Mormons had transformed Utah through water control and irrigation schemes. He wrote of the area around Phoenix, Arizona, that the "predominance of evaporation over precipitation, all serve to constrain the area assigned by nature to human activity, but none is capable of destroying human effort, especially when this is courageous and methodical. The example of Phoenix is the proof; it is also proof of the good work that the Reclamation Service has undertaken in the arid West."

== Last years (1914–20) ==
Vacher suffered from poor health, and in July 1914 underwent surgery in which chloroform was used as an anaesthetic. During World War I (1914–18), in January 1915 the Geographical Commission was established in close liaison with the 2nd Bureau of the Army Staff with six geographers, Albert Demangeon, Lucien Gallois, Emmanuel de Martonne, Emmanuel de Margerie, Louis Raveneau and Paul Vidal de la Blache. It seems that Vacher contributed intermittently to the work of the commission, since his name appears on some of its documents. After the armistice of November 1918 Vacher provided help with maps for the peace negotiations, some of which were added to the collection of the Lille geography department. He was given a personal professorship at Lille on 24 April 1919 but on 16 November 1919 was given leave due to health problems. He was given a full professorship on 1 January 1920. His health continued to deteriorate and Vacher died on 16 September 1920 in Paris at the age of 46.

After his death the teaching of geography at the university was disorganized for two years until the arrival of Maximilien Sorre in 1922.

== Publications ==
Publications included:

- Antoine Vacher (1908), Le Berry: contribution à l'étude géographique d'une région française (thesis), Paris: A. Colin, p. 548
- Antoine Vacher (1908), Fleuves et rivières de France (étude sur les documents réunis par l'administration des Ponts et Chaussées), Paris: Impr. nationale, p. 70

Vacher made several contributions to the Annales de Géographie:

- Antoine Vacher (1904), "Montluçon", Annales de Géographie, 13 (68): 121–137, doi:10.3406/geo.1904.6611
- Antoine Vacher (1905), "L'irrigation pérenne en Égypte et les projets de Sir William Willcocks", Annales de Géographie, 14 (73): 80–83, doi:10.3406/geo.1905.6502
- Antoine Vacher (1905), "La vallée de la Vienne et le coude d'Exideuil", Annales de Géographie, 14 (74): 111–117, doi:10.3406/geo.1905.6465
- Antoine Vacher (1905), "L'océanographie moderne", Annales de Géographie, 14 (76): 289–295, doi:10.3406/geo.1905.6407
- Antoine Vacher (1905), "Le haut Cher, sa vallée et son régime", Annales de Géographie, 14 (78): 399–423, doi:10.3406/geo.1905.2930
- Antoine Vacher (1909), "Rivières à méandres encaissés et terrains à méandres", Annales de Géographie, 18 (100): 311–327, doi:10.3406/geo.1909.6666
- Antoine Vacher (1912), "La septième excursion géographique interuniversitaire (1911)", Annales de Géographie, 21 (115): 80–83, doi:10.3406/geo.1912.7295
- Antoine Vacher (1913), "La région de Phoenix et le barrage Roosevelt", Annales de Géographie, 22 (122): 197–208, doi:10.3406/geo.1913.8362
- Antoine Vacher (1919), "La rade de Brest et ses abords", Annales de Géographie, 28 (153): 177–207, doi:10.3406/geo.1919.9318

== Sources ==
- "Antoine Vacher", BnF: Bibliotheque nationale de France
- Clout, Hugh (2004), "Lessons from experience: French geographers and the transcontinental excursion of 1912", Progress in Human Geography, 28 (5): 597–618, doi:10.1191/0309132504ph507oa, S2CID 143272385
- Condette, Jean-François (January 2001), "Les enseignants d'histoire et de géographie à la faculté des Lettres de Lille sous la Troisième République (1887-1940)", Revue du Nord, 339 (1): 65–100, doi:10.3917/rdn.339.0065
- Ginsburger, Nicolas (30 November 2010), " La guerre, la plus terrible des érosions " Cultures de guerre et géographes universitaires Allemagne-France-Etats-Unis (1914–1921) (PDF) (thesis) (in French), Université Paris Ouest Nanterre-La Défense, archived from the original (PDF) on 2020-11-27
- Lorimer, Hayden; Withers, Charles W. J. (2012-09-27), Geographers – Biobibliographical Studies, A&C Black, ISBN 978-1-4411-8624-9
- "The Society's Transcontinental Excursion", Bulletin of the American Geographical Society, 44 (9), American Geographical Society: 664–668, 1912, JSTOR 200815
