= Social geography =

Branch of human geography

Social geography is the branch of human geography that is interested in the relationships between society and space, and is most closely related to social theory in general and sociology in particular, dealing with the relation of social phenomena and its spatial components. Though the term itself has a tradition of more than 100 years, there is no consensus on its explicit content. In 1968, Anne Buttimer noted that "[w]ith some notable exceptions, (...) social geography can be considered a field created and cultivated by a number of individual scholars rather than an academic tradition built up within particular schools". Since then, despite some calls for convergence centred on the structure and agency debate, its methodological, theoretical and topical diversity has spread even more, leading to numerous definitions of social geography and, therefore, contemporary scholars of the discipline identifying a great variety of different social geographies. However, as Benno Werlen remarked, these different perceptions are nothing else than different answers to the same two (sets of) questions, which refer to the spatial constitution of society on the one hand, and to the spatial expression of social processes on the other. (Note: The outline of these questions is basically of dialectical purpose, and, in its original context, wasn't used as a subject's definition. (Cf. Jackson, Peter (2003): Introduction: The Social in Question. In: Anderson, Kay et al. (eds.) (2003): Handbook of Cultural Geography. London et al. (Sage): 37-42.) Also note that Werlen's original two questions that social geography has to answer slightly differ from these two, and that Buttimer (1968: 135) provides another two of such questions.)

The different conceptions of social geography have also been overlapping with other sub-fields of geography and, to a lesser extent, sociology. When the term emerged within the Anglo-American tradition during the 1960s, it was basically applied as a synonym for the search for patterns in the distribution of social groups, thus being closely connected to urban geography and urban sociology. In the 1970s, the focus of debate within American human geography lay on political economic processes (though there also was a considerable number of accounts for a phenomenological perspective on social geography), while in the 1990s, geographical thought was heavily influenced by the "cultural turn". Both times, as Neil Smith noted, these approaches "claimed authority over the 'social'". In the American tradition, the concept of cultural geography has a much more distinguished history than social geography, and encompasses research areas that would be conceptualized as "social" elsewhere. In contrast, within some continental European traditions, social geography was and still is considered an approach to human geography rather than a sub-discipline, (Note: for a more detailed account on the German-language geography, see Bobek, Hans (1962): Über den Einbau der sozialgeographischen Betrachtungsweise in die Kulturgeographie. Verhandlungen des deutschen Geographentages 33: 148-166. (in German)) or even as identical to human geography in general.

== History ==
=== Before World War II ===
The term "social geography" (or rather "géographie sociale") originates from France, where it was used both by geographer Élisée Reclus and by sociologists of the Le Play School, perhaps independently from each other. In fact, the first proven occurrence of the term derives from a review of Reclus' Nouvelle géographie universelle from 1884, written by Paul de Rousiers, a member of the Le Play School. Reclus himself used the expression in several letters, the first one dating from 1895, and in his last work L'Homme et la terre from 1905. The first person to employ the term as part of a publication's title was Edmond Demolins, another member of the Le Play School, whose article Géographie sociale de la France was published in 1896 and 1897. After the death of Reclus as well as the main proponents of Le Play's ideas, and with Émile Durkheim turning away from his early concept of social morphology, Paul Vidal de la Blache, who noted that geography "is a science of places and not a science of men", remained the most influential figure of French geography. One of his students, Camille Vallaux, wrote the two-volume book Géographie sociale, published in 1908 and 1911. Jean Brunhes, one of Vidal's most influential disciples, included a level of (spatial) interactions among groups into his fourfold structure of human geography. Until the Second World War, no more theoretical framework for social geography was developed, though, leading to a concentration on rather descriptive rural and regional geography. (Note: As Paul Claval (1986) puts it: "At mid-century, French geography was more open to social problems than other schools, but there is nothing like a recognised social geographical field." (p. 15)) However, Vidal's works were influential for the historical Annales School, who also shared the rural bias with the contemporary geographers, and Durkheim's concept of social morphology was later developed and set in connection with social geography by sociologists Marcel Mauss and Maurice Halbwachs.

The first person in the Anglo-American tradition to use the term "social geography" was George Wilson Hoke, whose paper The Study of Social Geography was published in 1907, yet there is no indication it had any academic impact. Le Play's work, however, was taken up in Britain by Patrick Geddes and Andrew John Herbertson. Percy M. Roxby, a former student of Herbertson, in 1930 identified social geography as one of human geography's four main branches. By contrast, the American academic geography of that time was dominated by the Berkeley School of Cultural Geography led by Carl O. Sauer, while the spatial distribution of social groups was already studied by the Chicago School of Sociology. Harlan H. Barrows, a geographer at the University of Chicago, nevertheless regarded social geography as one of the three major divisions of geography.

Another pre-war concept that combined elements of sociology and geography was the one established by Dutch sociologist Sebald Rudolf Steinmetz and his Amsterdam School of Sociography. However, it lacked a definitive subject, being a combination of geography and ethnography created as the more concrete counterpart to the rather theoretical sociology. In contrast, the Utrecht School of Social geography, which emerged in the early 1930s, sought to study the relationship between social groups and their living spaces.

=== Post-war period ===
==== Continental Europe ====
In the German-language geography, this focus on the connection between social groups and the landscape was further developed by Hans Bobek and Wolfgang Hartke after the Second World War. (Note: Though the term "Sozialgeographie" had been used before, the first call for a systematic consideration of social groups within German-language geography came from Richard Busch-Zantner (1937): Zur Ordnung der anthropogenen Faktoren. Petermanns Geographische Mitteilungen 83: 138-141 [139]. (in German) (Cited by: Werlen, Benno (2008): 75-76.). However, he died in the Second World War.) For Bobek, groups of Lebensformen (patterns of life)—influenced by social factors—that formed the landscape, were at the center of his social geographical analysis. In a similar approach, Hartke considered the landscape a source for indices or traces of certain social groups' behaviour. The best-known example of this perspective was the concept of Sozialbrache (social-fallow), i.e. the abandoning of tillage as an indicator for occupational shifts away from agriculture.

Though the French Géographie Sociale had been a great influence especially on Hartke's ideas, no such distinct school of thought formed within the French human geography. Nonetheless, Albert Demangeon paved the way for a number of more systematic conceptualizations of the field with his (posthumously published) notion that social groups ought to be within the center of human geographical analysis. That task was carried out by Pierre George and Maximilien Sorre, among others. Then a Marxist, George's stance was dominated by a socio-economic rationale, but without the structuralist interpretations found in the works of some the French sociologists of the time. However, it was another French Marxist, the sociologist Henri Lefebvre, who introduced the concept of the (social) production of space. He had written on that and related topics since the 1930s, but fully expounded it in La Production de L'Espace as late as 1974. Sorre developed a schema of society related to the ecological idea of habitat, which was applied to an urban context by the sociologist Paul-Henry Chombart de Lauwe. For the Dutch geographer Christiaan van Paassen, the world consisted of socio-spatial entities of different scales formed by what he referred to as a "syn-ecological complex", an idea influenced by existentialism.

A more analytical ecological approach on human geography was the one developed by Edgar Kant in his native Estonia in the 1930s and later at Lund University, which he called "anthropo-ecology". His awareness of the temporal dimension of social life would lead to the formation of time geography through the works of Torsten Hägerstrand and Sven Godlund.

== See also ==
- Geographical segregation
- History of geography
- Human ecology
- Sociology of space
- Urban vitality
