= Société de Géographie =

Geographical society based in Paris

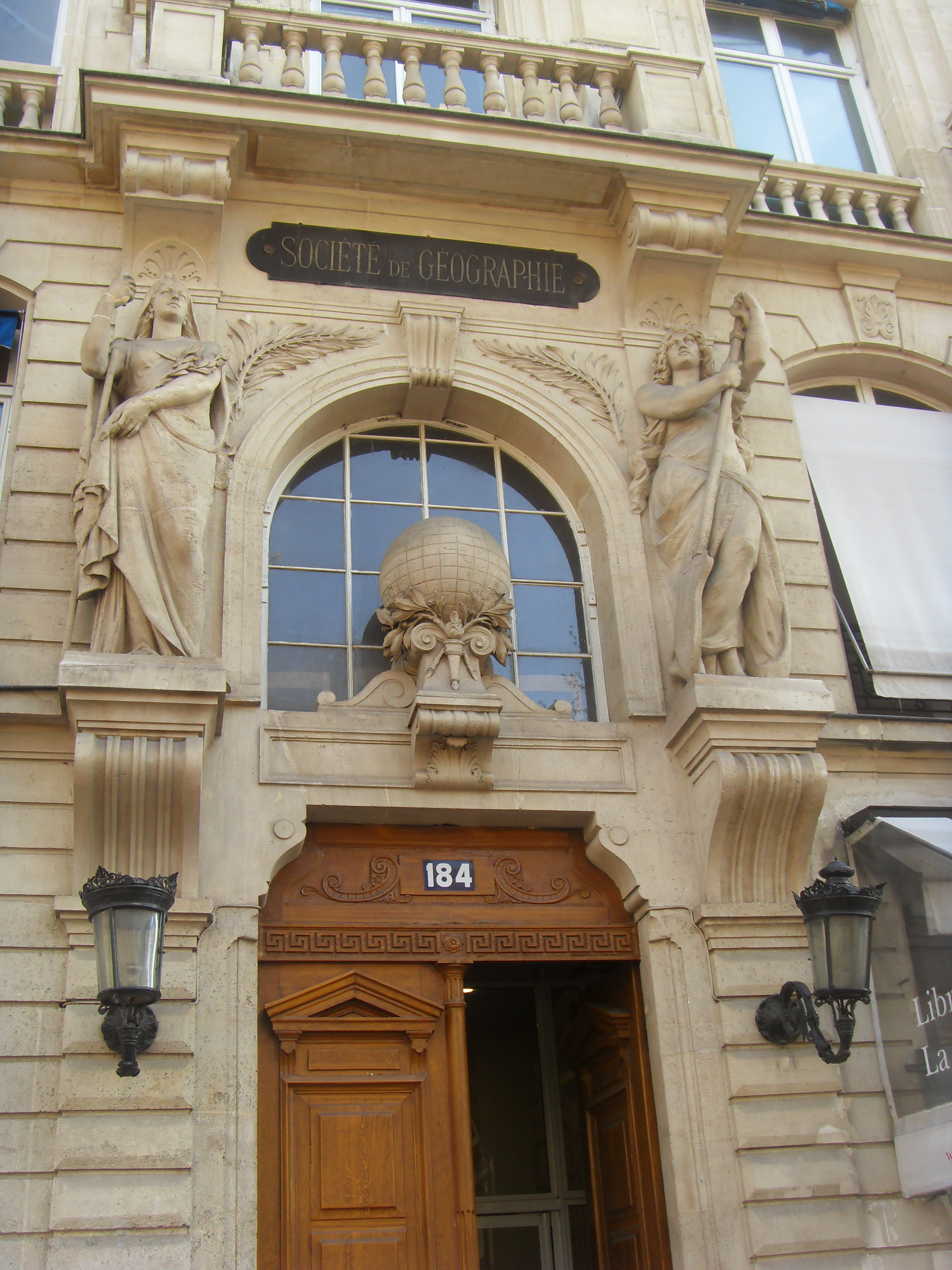
Société de Géographie

The Société de Géographie (French: [sɔsjete də ʒeɔgʁafi]; lit. '"Geography Society"'), is the world's oldest geographical society. It was founded in 1821 as the first Geographic Society. Since 1878, its headquarters have been at 184 Boulevard Saint-Germain, Paris. The entrance is marked by two gigantic caryatids representing Land and Sea. It was here, in 1879, that the construction of the Panama Canal was decided. The society has been publishing the journal La Géographie since 1822.

== History ==
The Geographical Society was founded at a meeting on 15 December 1821 in the Paris Hôtel de Ville. Among its 217 founders were some of the greatest scientific names of the time, including Pierre-Simon Laplace (the Society's first president), Georges Cuvier, Charles Pierre Chapsal, Vivant Denon, Joseph Fourier, Gay-Lussac, Claude Louis Berthollet, Alexander von Humboldt, Champollion, and François-René de Chateaubriand. Most of the men who had accompanied Bonaparte in his Egyptian expedition were members: Edme-François Jomard, Conrad Malte-Brun, Jules Dumont d'Urville, Jules Paul Benjamin Delessert, Hottinguer, Henri Didot, Bottin and others such as Jean-Baptiste Benoît Eyriès.

Although the Society rarely funded scientific travel, by issuing instructions to voyagers, encouraging research through competitions, and publishing the results of their work, it served in its early years as "an important institutional support" for the study of Mesoamerica. Two members in the "active core" of the society played central roles in this regard: Jomard and the Irish exile and former United States consul David Ballie Warden. Their terms for a competition for the best new work on "American antiquities", including maps "constructed according to exact methods" and "observations on the mores and customs of the indigenous peoples, and vocabularies of the ancient languages." extended decades-old scientific practices to a new field of anthropological inquiry.

The society was to be associated in time with the greatest French and foreign explorers from René Caillié, the first European to return alive from the town of Timbuktu, to the underwater explorer Jacques Cousteau, and leading geographers, among them Vidal de la Blache, founder of the French School of Geopolitics.

In 1879, under the leadership of Ferdinand de Lesseps, the Society hosted an international congress on the questioning of an Interocéanique canal across Central America, the findings of which led to the initial efforts to construct the Panama Canal.

The Society was the location of the Arab Congress of 1913, which took place from June 18 to June 23 of that year and marked the confluence of events surrounding the decline of the Ottoman Empire, the beginnings of Arab nationalism, and the early Arab reaction to Zionist immigration to Palestine.

== Publications ==
The Society's revue has appeared monthly since 1822, as Bulletin de la Société de Géographie (1822–1899) – offering in octavo format early news of all the discoveries of the nineteenth century – or quarterly, as La Géographie, with a break from 1940 until 1946. Since 1947 the Society's magazine has appeared three times a year, as Acta Geographica.

== List of presidents ==
1822	Marquis Pierre-Simon de Laplace (1749–1827)
1823	Marquis Claude-Emmanuel de Pastoret (1755–1840)
1824	Vicount François-René de Chateaubriand (1768–1848)
1825	Gilbert Joseph Gaspard de Chabrol de Volvic (1773–1843)
1826	Louis Becquey (1760–1849)
1827	Count Christophe Chabrol de Crouzol (1771–1836)
1828	Baron Georges Cuvier (1769–1832)
1829	Jean-Guillaume Hyde de Neuville (1776–1857)
1830	Duke Ambroise-Polycarpe de La Rochefoucauld (1765–1817)
1831	Antoine Maurice Apollinaire d'Argout (1782–1858)
1832	Admiral Count Henri de Rigny (1782–1835)
1833	Duke Élie Decazes (1788–1860)
1834	Count Camille de Montalivet (1801–1880)
1835	Baron Prosper de Barante (1782–1866)
1836	Lieutenant-General Baron Jean-Jacques Germain Pelet-Clozeau (1777–1858)
1837	François Guizot (1787–1874)
1838	Count Narcisse-Achille de Salvandy (1795–1856)
1839	Baron Jean Tupinier (1779–1850)
1840	Count Hippolyte Jaubert (1798–1874)
1841	Abel-François Villemain (1790–1867)
1842	Laurent Cunin-Gridaine (1778–1859)
1843	Admiral Baron Albin Roussin (1781–1854)
1844	Vice-admiral Baron Ange-René-Armand de Mackau (1788–1855)
1845	Baron Alexander von Humboldt (1769–1859)
1846	Baron Charles Athanase Walckenaer (1771–1852)
1847	Count Louis-Mathieu Molé (1781–1855)
1848	Edmé François Jomard (1777–1862)
1849	Jean-Baptiste Dumas (1800–1884)
1851	Rear-Admiral Pierre-L.-A. Mathieu
1853	Vice-Admiral (1853) C. Laplace (1793–1875)
1854	Hippolyte Fortoul (1811–1856)
1855	Noël Jacques Lefebvre-Duruflé (1792–1877)
1856	Joseph-Daniel Guigniaut (1794–1876)
1857	Pierre Daussy (1792–1860)
1858	General Eugène Daumas (1803–1871)
1859	Jean-Baptiste Élie de Beaumont (1798–1874)
1860	Gustave Rouland (1806–1878)
1861	Admiral Joseph Romain-Desfossés (1798–1864)
1862	Count Victor de Persigny (1808–1872)
1863	Count Alexandre Florian Joseph Colonna Walewski (1810–1868)
1864	Marquis Prosper de Chasseloup-Laubat (1805–1873)
1873	Vice-Admiral Camille Clément de La Roncière-Le Noury (1813–1881)
1881	Ferdinand de Lesseps (1805–1894)
1890	Jean Louis Armand de Quatrefages de Bréau (1810–1892)
1892	Antoine d'Abbadie d'Arrast (1810–1897)
1893	Gabriel Auguste Daubrée (1814–1896)
1894	Auguste Himly (1823–1906)
1895	Jules Janssen (1824–1907)
1896	Anatole Bouquet de La Grye (1827–1909)
1897	Alphonse Milne-Edwards (1835–1900)
1901	Alfred Grandidier (1836–1921)
1906	Charles Marie Le Myre de Vilers (1833–1918)
1909	Ernest Hamy (1842–1908)
1910	Prince Roland Bonaparte (1858–1924)
1925	Henri Cordier (1849–1925)
1926	Ernest Roume (1858–1941)
1928	Édouard-Alfred Martel (1859–1938)
1931	Marshal Louis Félix Marie François Franchet d’Esperey (1856–1942)
1939	General Georges Perrier (1872–1946)
1947	Emmanuel de Martonne (1873–1955)
1953	Robert Perret (1881–1965)
1960	Engineer-General Louis Hurault (fr) (1886–1973)
1965	Jean Despois (fr) (1901–1978)
1975	Aimé Perpillou (1902–1976)
1976	Roger Blais (1926–2009)
1983	Jacqueline Beaujeu-Garnier (1917–1995)
1995	Jean Bastié (fr) (1919–2018)
2009	Jean-Robert Pitte (fr) (1949–)

== Awards ==
=== Grande Médaille d'Or des Explorations ===
The Grande Médaille d'Or des Explorations et Voyages de Découverte (Great Gold Medal of Exploration and Journeys of Discovery) has been awarded since 1829 for journeys whose outcomes have enhanced geographical knowledge. Notable recipients have been John Franklin (1829), John Ross (1834), David Livingstone (1857), Ernest Shackleton (1910) and Roald Amundsen (1913).

The Société de Géographie Peninsula in Kerguelen was named in honor of this institution.

== See also ==
- Recueil de Voyages et de Mémoires
