= Aimé Perpillou =

French geographer (1902 - 1976)

Aimé Vincent Perpillou
- Born: 24 January 1902; Glanges, Haute-Vienne, France
- Died: 12 February 1976 (aged 74); Paris, France
- Occupation: Geographer

Aimé Vincent Perpillou (24 January 1902 – 12 February 1976) was a French geographer.

== Early years ==
Aimé Vincent Perpillou was born in Glanges, Haute-Vienne, on 24 January 1902. He was from an old Limousin family. His parents were André Perpillou, a soldier, and Marie Bancaud.

For his secondary education, he first attended the Lycée Gay-Lussac in Limoges, then after his father had been posted to western France, he attended the Lycée Henri IV in Poitiers. In 1923, he passed the entrance exam and was admitted to the École Normale Supérieure (ENS) in the rue d'Ulm, Paris. While at this school, he also attended classes taught by Lucien Gallois and Albert Demangeon at the Institut de Géographie of the Sorbonne (University of Paris). His classmates included Jean-Paul Sartre and the geographer, Jean Dresch. He undertook research into climatology, earning a diplôme d'études supérieures for this work.

While studying in Paris, Perpillou met Suzanne Demangeon, daughter of the professor of social geography Albert Demangeon. They later married, and had a son and three daughters.

In 1927, he came first in France in the agrégation exam in history and geography. He undertook a year of military service, then accepted a teaching position at his former school, the Lycés Gay-Lussac in Limoges.

== Academic career ==
Perpillou soon moved from Limoges to teach maritime geography in Brest at the École Navale and the École des élèves ingénieurs mécaniciens de la Marine. He remained in Brest until 1939. During his time in Brest in the 1930s, he published several articles on the coastline and sea bed around the west of Brittany. He also examined terrain and changes in land use in the Limousin area, the basis for his doctorat d'état in 1940. Perpillou, based on careful study of land use in Limousin, stated that before the eradication of the heath at the end of the nineteenth century, for eight centuries the agricultural landscape in Limousin had undergone only minor modifications.

During World War II (1939–45) he was active with the Société de géographie of Paris. In 1945, Perpillou became a lecturer at the Faculty of Letters in the University of Lille. His assistant in Lille was Philippe Pinchemel, who would follow Perpillou when he moved back to the Sorbonne and would lecture on economic geography at the Institut d'Études Politiques de Paris from 1948 to 1953. In 1947, Perpillou was appointed secretary-general of the Société de géographie, and held this position for the next 25 years. In 1948, he accepted the chair of economic geography at the Institut de géographie of the Sorbonne, and was given the same office that had been used by his father-in-law. He taught there for the rest of his academic career. Perpillou also taught at the ENS at Saint Cloud from 1944 to 1955, and at the ENS rue d'Ulm from 1948 to 1952. He was elected to the Académie de Marine in 1958. In 1960, Perpillou moved to the Lycée Henri-IV in Paris.

Perpillou retired from the Sorbonne in 1972 and accepted the position of President of the Société de géographie. He died in Paris on 12 February 1976.

== Publications ==
Perpillou influenced Marc Bloch with his treatment of climate, in which he did not rely on averages but argued that "It is not 'le temps qu'il fait' [the weather], in its often brutal integrality and reality, from which above all man suffers the repercussions." At first, Perpillou was mainly interested in physical geography, but most of his publications concerned human geography, particularly economic geography. He was very interested in the study of marine geography and history. Perpillou extended his work in Limousin to cover the whole of France in a series of colored national and regional maps that display land use in the early 19th century, early 20th century and post-war period.

Perpillou's publications include:

- Albert Demangeon; Aimé Perpillou (1937), Asie. Insulinde. Afrique Classe de cinquième, Paris: Hachette, p. 266
- Albert Demangeon; Aimé Perpillou (1938), Le Monde moins l'Europe (Nouveau cours de géographie, publié sous la direction de M. Albert Demangeon), Coulommiers, Paris: impr. Brodard et Taupin; Paris, Hachette
- Aimé Perpillou (1940), Cartographie du paysage rural limousin. Essai d'utilisation rationelle des documents cadastraux. Commentaires. Atlas, Paris: Hachette
- Aimé Perpillou (1940), Le Limousin, étude de géographie physique régionale, Paris: Hachette.
- Albert Demangeon; Aimé Perpillou (1941), Géographie générale classe de 2e..., Paris: Hachette
- Aimé Perpillou (1945), La Région parisienne (Collection de monographies), Paris: Bourrelier; (Corbeil, impr. de Crété), p. 40
- Aimé Perpillou (1947), Géographie, Paris: Didier (impr. de Chaix)
- Atlas Blondel, Preface by A. Perpillou, Paris: Blondel La Rougery, 1947
- Louis François; André Meynier; Aimé Perpillou (1948), Les Principales puissances et la vie économique du monde (Cours de géographie A. Demangeon), Paris: Hachette; (Coulommiers, impr. de Brodard et Taupin)
- Albert Demangeon; Aimé Perpillou (1948), Géographie générale (Nouveau cours de géographie Demangeon), Paris: Hachette; (Corbeil, impr. de Crété)
- Albert Demangeon; Aimé Perpillou (1949), Le Monde (Classiques Hachette), Paris: Hachette; (Coulommiers, impr. de Brodard et Taupin)
- Léon Bocquet; André Mabille de Poncheville; Aimé Perpillou (1949), Visages de la Flandre et de l'Artois, Paris: Editions des Horizons de France
- André Betgé-Brezetz; Marie-Madeleine Gauthier; Serge Gauthier; Aimé Perpillou (1950), Visages du Limousin et de la Marche, Paris: Editions des Horizons de France
- André Adenis; Aimé Perpillou (1950), Géographie du Limousin, Guéret: les Presses du Massif central
- Aimé Perpillou (1951), Le Japon (Sorbonne course), Paris: Centre de documentation Universitaire
- Aimé Perpillou (1952), Géographie de la circulation (Sorbonne course), Paris: Tournier et Constans
- Aimé Perpillou (1952), Géographie de la circulation. Navigation maritime et navigation aérienne. le domaine Atlantique, Paris: Centre de documentation Universitaire
- Albert Demangeon; Aimé Perpillou (1952), Géographie humaine (Classiques Hachette), Paris: Hachette; (Coulommiers, impr. de Brodard et Taupin
- Aimé Perpillou (1953), Géographie de la circulation. Les Routes, Paris: Centre de documentation universitaire
- Aimé Perpillou (1953), Géographie économique. La Laine (Sorbonne course), Paris: Tournier et Constans
- Aimé Perpillou (1953), L'Habitat rural (Sorbonne course), Paris: Centre de documentation universitaire
- Aimé Perpillou (1954), L'Élevage : l'exploitation des bovins (Sorbonne course), Paris: Centre de documentation universitaire
- Aimé Perpillou (1954), Géographie de la circulation. Les Chemins de fer dans le Nouveau Monde, Paris: Centre de documentation universitaire
- Aimé Perpillou (1954), Géographie des céréales (Sorbonne course), Paris: Centre de documentation universitaire
- Pierre Birot; Maurice Pardé; Aimé Perpillou; L. Solé Sabarís; Jean Tricart (1954), André Cholley (ed.), Mémoires et documents Tome 4, Paris: C.N.R.S.
- Aimé Perpillou (1954), Géographie économique des Etats Unis, Paris: Centre de documentation Universitaire
- Aimé Perpillou (1954), La Morphologie des côtes du Léon (C.N.R.S. Centre de documentation cartographique et géographique.), Paris: Centre national de la recherche scientifique
- Aimé Perpillou (1956), Géographie de la circulation. Les Chemins de fer en Afrique et en Australie (Sorbonne course), Paris: Centre de documentation universitaire
- Aimé Perpillou (1956), Introduction à la géographie de l'alimentation, Paris: Centre de Documentation Universitaire
- Aimé Perpillou (1956), La vigne, Paris: Centre de Documentation Universitaire
- Aimé Perpillou (1957), La Pêche (Sorbonne course), Paris: Centre de documentation universitaire
- Aimé Perpillou (1958), L'économie agricole de l'Australie, Paris: Centre de Documentation Universitaire, p. 72
- Aimé Perpillou (1958), Les routes, Paris: Centre de Documentation Universitaire, p. 67
- Lucien Pernet; Aimé Perpillou (1959), 50 diapositives de géographie. Géographie générale, Paris: Hachette (impr. Brodard et Taupin)
- Aimé Perpillou (1959), Géographie de la circulation Les transports en Europe méridionale et occidentale, Paris: Centre de documentation universitaire
- Aimé Perpillou (1959), Géographie de la circulation. La navigation et les transports maritimes. 1ère partie. les transports maritimes et les ports, Paris: Centre de Documentation Universitaire
- Aimé Perpillou (1960), "Perspectives économiques dans le département de la Haute-Vienne", Technique, Art, Science (140), Paris: 9–28
- Aimé Perpillou (1960), L'évolution de l'utilisation du sol par l'agriculture dans huit départements du Midi de la France, Paris: Centre national de la recherche scientifique
- Georges Chabot; Marcel Dubois; Aimé Perpillou (1960), Mémoires et documents. Tome VII, Paris: C.N.R.S. et Institut de géographie
- Aimé Perpillou (1961), L'Agriculture dans les régions climatiques du globe... 1 Régions tempérées et régions tropicales humides, Paris: Centre de documentation universitaire, p. 107
- Aimé Perpillou (1961), Géographie de la circulation Les Transports maritimes et les ports, Paris: Centre de documentation universitaire
- Aimé Perpillou (1961), Les Industries métallurgiques (Sorbonne course), Paris: Centre de documentation universitaire
- Aimé Perpillou (1961), L'Industrie textile (Sorbonne course), Paris: Centre de documentation universitaire
- Aimé Perpillou (1962), Activités maritimes et problèmes portuaries dans l'économie moderne (Sorbonne course), Paris: Centre de documentation universitaire, p. 113
- Aimé Perpillou (1962), "Problèmes portuaires dans l'économie contemporaine", Comité des travaux historiques. Bulletin de la section de géographie, LXXV, Paris: Impr. nationale: 197–217
- Aimé Perpillou (1962), Le Commerce international des produits agricoles (Sorbonne course), Paris: Centre de documentation universitaire
- Aimé Perpillou (1962), Les Liaisons fluviales Seine-Est de la France, Paris: Académie de marine; (Houilles : Impr. marine)
- Aimé Perpillou (1962), Seine-Moselle, esquisse d'une voie d'eau intérieure, Paris: Impr. H. François et fils, p. 44
- Aimé Perpillou (1962), Les Forêts (Sorbonne course), Paris: Centre de documentation universitaire
- Lucien Pernet; Aimé Perpillou (1962), Géographie "Nouveaux programmes", Paris: Hachette (impr. G. Lang)
- Aimé Perpillou (1963), Les Transports intérieurs aux États-Unis (Sorbonne course), Paris: Centre de documentation universitaire, p. 65
- Aimé Perpillou (1964), Les Chemins de fer français et leur place dans le réseau ferroviaire de l'Europe nord-occidentale (Sorbonne course. Géographie), Paris: Centre de documentation universitaire
- Aimé Perpillou (1965), Géographie rurale (Sorbonne course), Paris: Centre de documentation universitaire
- Aimé Perpillou (1965), Les Transports par mer et le commerce maritime (Sorbonne course), Paris: Centre de documentation universitaire, p. 130
- Aimé Perpillou (September 1965), "Robert Perret, 1881–1965", Acta Geographica (57), Paris: Société de géographie: 2–4
- Aimé Perpillou (1966), Géographie. Cours élémentaire, classes de 10e et 9e des lycées et collèges, Paris: Didier
- Aimé Perpillou (1966), Human geography, London: Longmans
- Aimé Perpillou (1966), Les produits de l'élevage, types de production et commercialisation, Paris: Centre de Documentation Universitaire, p. 101
- Aimé Perpillou (1967), Les Grandes pêcheries mondiales (Sorbonne course), Paris: Centre de documentation universitaire
- Aimé Perpillou (1967), L'Industrie des constructions navales (Sorbonne course), Paris: Centre de documentation universitaire
- Aimé Perpillou (1967), L'Industrie et les ports (Sorbonne course), Paris: Centre de documentation universitaire
- Aimé Perpillou (1967), Le Ravitaillement des grandes villes (Sorbonne course), Paris: Centre de documentation universitaire, p. 116

== Sources ==
- Aimé Perpillou (1902–1976), BnF: Bibliotheque nationale de France
- Borde, Christian (2007), "La Securite maritime dans les constructions navales (1855-1912)", Les constructions navales dans l'histoire (in French), Presses Paris Sorbonne, ISBN 978-2-84050-509-9
- Clout, Hugh (2012-09-27), "Aimé Vincent Perpillou", Geographers – Biobibliographical Studies, A&C Black, ISBN 978-1-4411-8624-9
- Clout, Hugh D. (2013-10-02), Themes in the Historical Geography of France, Elsevier, ISBN 978-1-4832-6724-1
- Friedman, Susan W. (2004-11-11), Marc Bloch, Sociology and Geography: Encountering Changing Disciplines, Cambridge University Press, ISBN 978-0-521-61215-9
- Lorimer, Hayden; Withers, Charles W. J. (2015-12-14), Geographers: Biobibliographical Studies, Bloomsbury Publishing, ISBN 978-1-4742-2719-3
- Tricard, Jean (2003), Le village des limousins: études sur l'habitat et la société rurale du Moyen Âge à nos jours (in French), Presses Univ. Limoges, ISBN 978-2-84287-258-8
