= Emmanuel de Martonne =

French geographer (1873–1955)

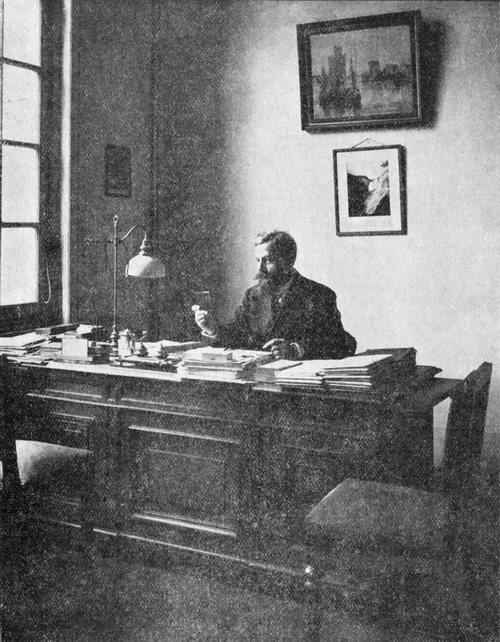
- Emmanuel de Martonne, taken before 1929
- Born: 1 April 1873; Chabris, France
- Died: 24 July 1955 (aged 82); Sceaux, France
- Occupation: Geographer

Emmanuel de Martonne (French pronunciation: [ɛmanɥɛl də maʁtɔn], 1 April 1873 – 24 July 1955) was a French geographer. He participated in the Paris Peace Conference.

== Early life and education ==
Martonne was born on 1 April 1873 in Chabris, Indre, France, and was the son-in-law of Paul Vidal de la Blache. In 1892, he entered the École Normale Supérieure. He graduated three years later with a degree in history and geography. After that, he worked with Ferdinand von Richthofen and Albrecht Penck.

== Career ==
In 1899, de Martonne became a professor at the University of Rennes. There he founded the institute of geography on the German model. In October 1905 he moved to the University of Lyon, replaced at Rennes by Antoine Vacher. Four years later he moved to the Sorbonne. During World War I (1914–18), in January 1915 the Geographical Commission was established in close liaison with the 2nd Bureau of the Army Staff with six geographers, Albert Demangeon, Lucien Gallois, Emmanuel de Martonne, Emmanuel de Margerie, Louis Raveneau and Paul Vidal de La Blache.

During the Paris Peace Conference after the war, de Martonne was an adviser of Minister of Foreign Affairs André Tardieu and Prime Minister Georges Clemenceau. He also lobbied for the return of Alsace-Lorraine to the French. De Martonne was also secretary of the Comité D'études, which worked on fixing boundary issues following the war, especially in Romania and the Balkans. He was familiar with Central Europe and Romania, as he had conducted studies in the Southern Carpathians earlier in his life.

After that, he taught at the University of Cluj in 1921. He died on 24 July 1955 in Sceaux, a commune near Paris.

== Awards and honors ==
He became an honorary member of the Geographical Society of the USSR in 1933., and, from 1938 to 1952, was president of the International Geographical Union. He was awarded the Cullum Geographical Medal in 1939, and the Victoria Medal in 1950. He became a member of the French Academy of Sciences in 1942.

== Publications ==
In 1909, he published the first edition of his book Traité de géographie physique: Climat, Hydrographie, Relief du sol, Biogéographie. It contains 396 three-dimensional, painstakingly researched illustrations and maps. It covers many aspects of geography, including different map projections, the geographic coordinate system, physical geography, climate, hydrography, erosion, glaciers, and biogeography. The second edition was published in 1913, and the third in 1920.

He published Les Alpes: Géographie générale, a study about the Alps, in 1926. This led to the "De Martonne aridity index".

In his work Problème des régions arides Sud-Américaines De Martonne was the first to coin and define the South American Arid Diagonal.

== Sources ==
- Brock, Numa; Giusti, Christian (February 2007), "Autour du Traité de Géographie physique d'Emmanuel de Martonne", Géomorphologie (in French), 13 (2): 125–144, doi:10.4000/geomorphologie.921, ISSN 1957-777X
- Ginsburger, Nicolas (30 November 2010), " La guerre, la plus terrible des érosions " Cultures de guerre et géographes universitaires Allemagne-France-Etats-Unis (1914–1921) (PDF) (thesis) (in French), Université Paris Ouest Nanterre-La Défense, archived from the original (PDF) on 2020-11-27
- Lorimer, Hayden; Withers, Charles W. J. (2012-09-27), Geographers – Biobibliographical Studies, A&C Black, ISBN 978-1-4411-8624-9
