= Sorre =

Sorre is a French surname. Notable people with the surname include:

- Bertrand Sorre (born 1965), French politician
- Maximilien Sorre (1880–1962), French geographer
