= Jean Gottmann =

French geographer (1915–1994)

(Ivan) Jean Gottmann (10 October 1915 – 28 February 1994) was a French Jewish geographer who was best known for his seminal study on the urban region of the Northeast megalopolis. His main contributions to human geography were in the sub-fields of urban, political, economic, historical and regional geography. His regional specializations ranged from France and the Mediterranean to the United States, Israel, and Japan.

== Early life and education ==
Gottmann was born in Kharkiv, Ukraine, Russian Empire. He was the only child of prosperous Jewish parents of French and Dutch descent, Elie Gottmann and Sonia-Fanny Ettinger, who were killed in February 1918, following the Russian Revolution of 1917. He was adopted de facto by his aunt, Emily Gottmann, and uncle, Michel Berchin, and escaped with them to Paris in 1921 through what was then Constantinople in present-day Istanbul. In Constantinople, he changed his first name, Iona, to the French cognate Jean.

== Career ==
Gottmann received a French education and became early a research assistant in economic geography at the Sorbonne (1937–41) under the guidance of Albert Demangeon, but was forced to leave his post with the Nazi invasion of France and the 1940 Statute of Jews, which banned him from public employment. He found refuge in the United States, where he received a Rockefeller Foundation fellowship to attend the Institute for Advanced Study in Princeton, New Jersey, in the seminar of Edward M. Earle. During the war, he contributed to the U.S. effort by consulting for the Board of Economic Warfare in Washington and other agencies; he also joined Free France and the exiled French academic community teaching at the New School for Social Research. Isaiah Bowman hired him as a non-tenured professor at his new institute of geography of the Johns Hopkins University (1943–48). In 1945, he returned to France to work for the French Ministry of the Economy, and he also spent two years as director of research at the United Nations (1946–47).

After World War II, he started to commute between France and the United States in an effort to explain America's human geography to the French public and Europe's to the American. His multicultural perspective allowed him to get a grant from Paul Mellon to produce the first regional study of Virginia (1953–55) and financial support from The Century Foundation to study the megalopolis of the North-Eastern seaboard of the United States, which soon became a paradigm in urban geography and planning to define polynuclear global city-regions.

In 1957, he married Bernice Adelson. In 1961, he was invited to join the École des Hautes Études en Sciences Sociales in Paris by Fernand Braudel, Claude Lévi-Strauss, and Alexandre Koyré and in 1968 became Professor of Geography and Head of the School of Geography at the University of Oxford (1968–1983). In the 1980s, Gottmann wrote numerous essays to develop his ideas about ‘transactional’ cities, whose primary economic function is the processing and distribution of information. After retiring as emeritus professor, he remained in Oxford until the end of his life.

Beyond his contribution to the study of megalopolis and to urban geography, his theoretical work on the political partitioning of geographical space as a result of the interplay between movement flows and symbolic systems (iconographies) has been rediscovered after his death.

== Awards ==
Gottmann was awarded an Honorary Fellowship from the American Geographical Society in 1956, and its Charles P. Daly Medal in 1964. In 1980, he received the Victoria Medal of the Royal Geographical Society. He also was a fellow of the American Academy of Arts and Sciences and the British Academy.

== Bibliography ==
Jean Gottmann's bibliography lists about 400 references. The following list is a selection of some of his most relevant books and papers:

- L'homme, la route et l'eau en Asie sud-occidentale (1938)
- De la méthode d'analyse en géographie humaine, Annales de Géographie (1947)
- L'Amerique (1949)
- A geography of Europe (1950, 1969)
- La politique des Etats et leur géographie (1952)
- Virginia at mid-Century (1955)
- Les marchés des matières premières (1957)
- Etudes sur l'Etat d'Israel (1958)
- Megalopolis: The Urbanized Northeastern Seaboard of the United States (1961)
- Essais sur l'amenagement de l'espace habité (1966)
- The significance of territory (1973)
- Centre and Periphery (1980)
- La città invincibile (1983)
- Since Megalopolis (1990)
- Beyond Megalopolis (1994)

== See also ==
- Geographers on Film
- Megalopolis (city type)
