= Recueil de Voyages et de Mémoires =

French publication series

Recueil de voyages et de mémoires (first volume)

Recueil de voyages et de mémoires (Collection of Travels and Memoirs) is a French publication series with travel accounts and memoirs which was published by the Société de Géographie (Geography Society) in Paris, the world's oldest geographical society, which was founded in 1821. It was published from 1824 to 1866. Its first volume was Voyage de Marc Pol.

In volume 4 it contains f.e. the work of Friar Jordanus, who became Bishop of Quilon in Kerala in 1329, the only work written during the Medieval period that focussed on India, which was the first in Europe to mention the Marathi country. It was used by the Hakluyt Society for its own edition. This volume also contains accounts by William of Rubruck and Giovanni da Pian del Carpine. Volumes 5 and 6 are both entitled Géographie d'Édrisi.

Some parts of the volumes also appeared as separate editions, f.e. Mémoire sur la partie méridionale de l'Asie centrale by Nicolas de Khanikoff [ru] (1819–1878).

== Overview (in selection) ==
- I. Voyage de Marc Pol. 1824
- II.

Une relation de Ghanat et des coutumes de ses habitants
Des relations inédites de la Cyrénaïque
Une notice sur la mesure géométrique de quelques sommités des Alpes
Résultats des questions adressées à un Maure de Tischit et à un Négre de Walet
Réponses aux questions de la Sociéte sur l'Afrique septentrionale
Un itinéraire de Constantinople à la Mecque -
Une description des ruines découvertes près de Palenqué : suivie de Recherches sur l'ancienne population de l'Amérique
Une notice sur la carte générale des pachalicks de Hkaleb, Orfa et Bagdad
Un mémoire sur la géographie de Perse
Des recherches sur les antiquités des États-Unis de l'Amérique septentrionale

- III. L'orographie de l'Europe / M.L. Bruguiere
- IV. digitalized copy

Description des merveilles d'une partie de l'Asie / P. Jordan, de Sévérac
Relation d'un voyage à l'île d'Amat, d'après les manuscrits de M. Henri Ternaux
Vocabulaires de plusieurs contrées de l'Afrique, d'après M. Koenig
Voyages en Orient de Guillaume de Rubruk
Notice sur les anciens voyages de Tartarie en général, et sur celui de Jean du Plan de Carpin en particuler
Relation de la Tartarie de Jean du Plan de Carpin
Voyage de Bernard et de ses compagnons en Égypte et en Terre-Sainte
Relation des voyages de Saevulf à Jérusalem et en Terre-Sainte

- V. and VI. La géographie d'Edrisi / traduite de l'arabe en français
- VII.

Grammaire et dictionaire de la langue Berbère.
Mémoire sur la partie Méridionale de l'Asie centrale (Nicolas de Khanikoff)
Recherches sur Tyr et Palaetyr
Essais de restitution et d'interprétation d'un passage de Scylax.

- VIII.

Mémoire de l'ethnographie de la Perse par Nicolas de Khanikoff. 1866

== See also ==
- Voyages, relations et mémoires (in German)
- Works issued by the Hakluyt Society (in German)
