= Lycée Maximilien Sorre =

Senior high school in Val de Marne, France

Lycée Maximilien Sorre (LMS) is a sixth-form college/senior high school in Cachan, Val de Marne, France, in the Paris metropolitan area.
