= Société de Géographie Peninsula =

Peninsula in France

Presqu'île de la Société de Géographie
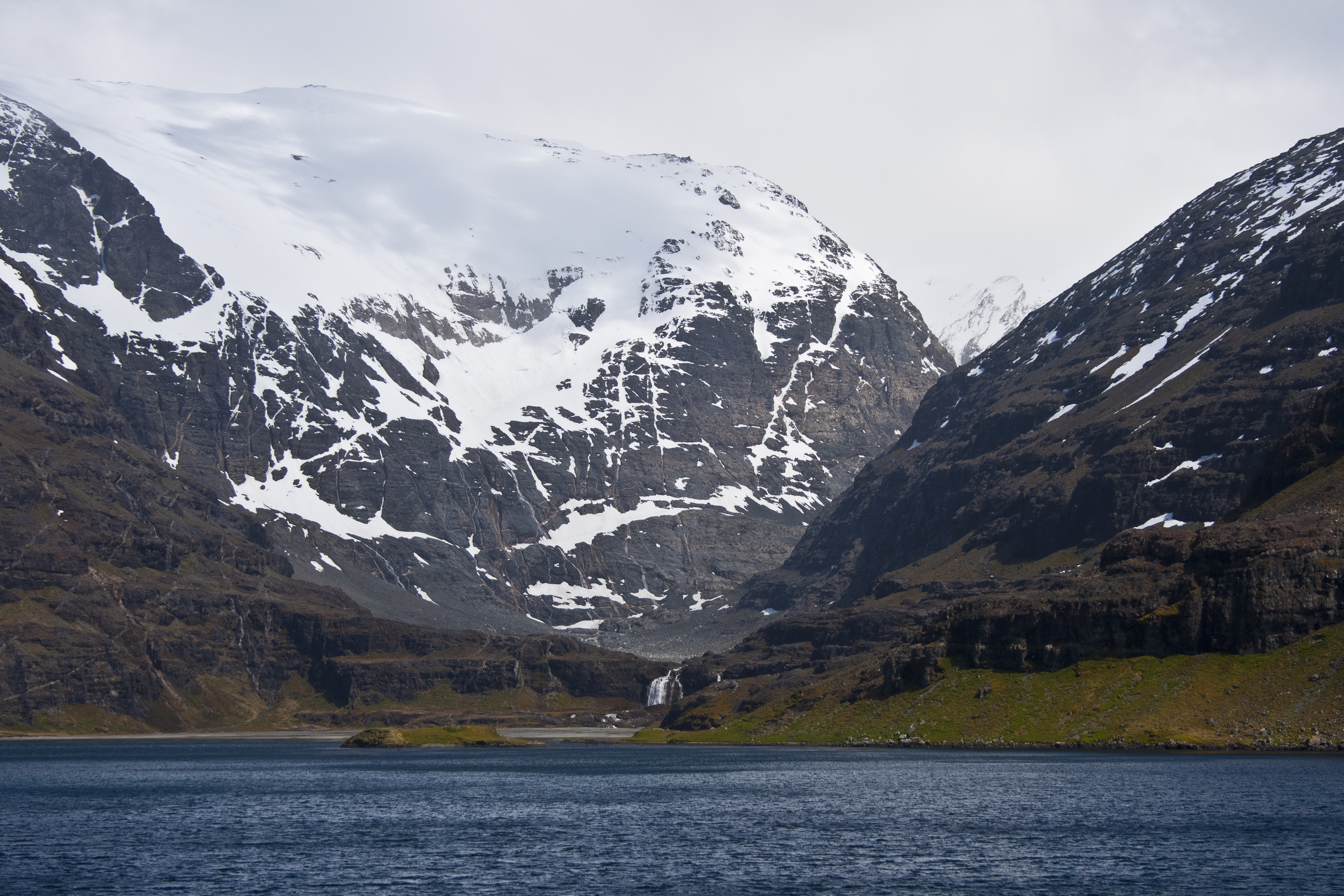
- Panorama of the Peninsula's shore seen from the Baie du Français

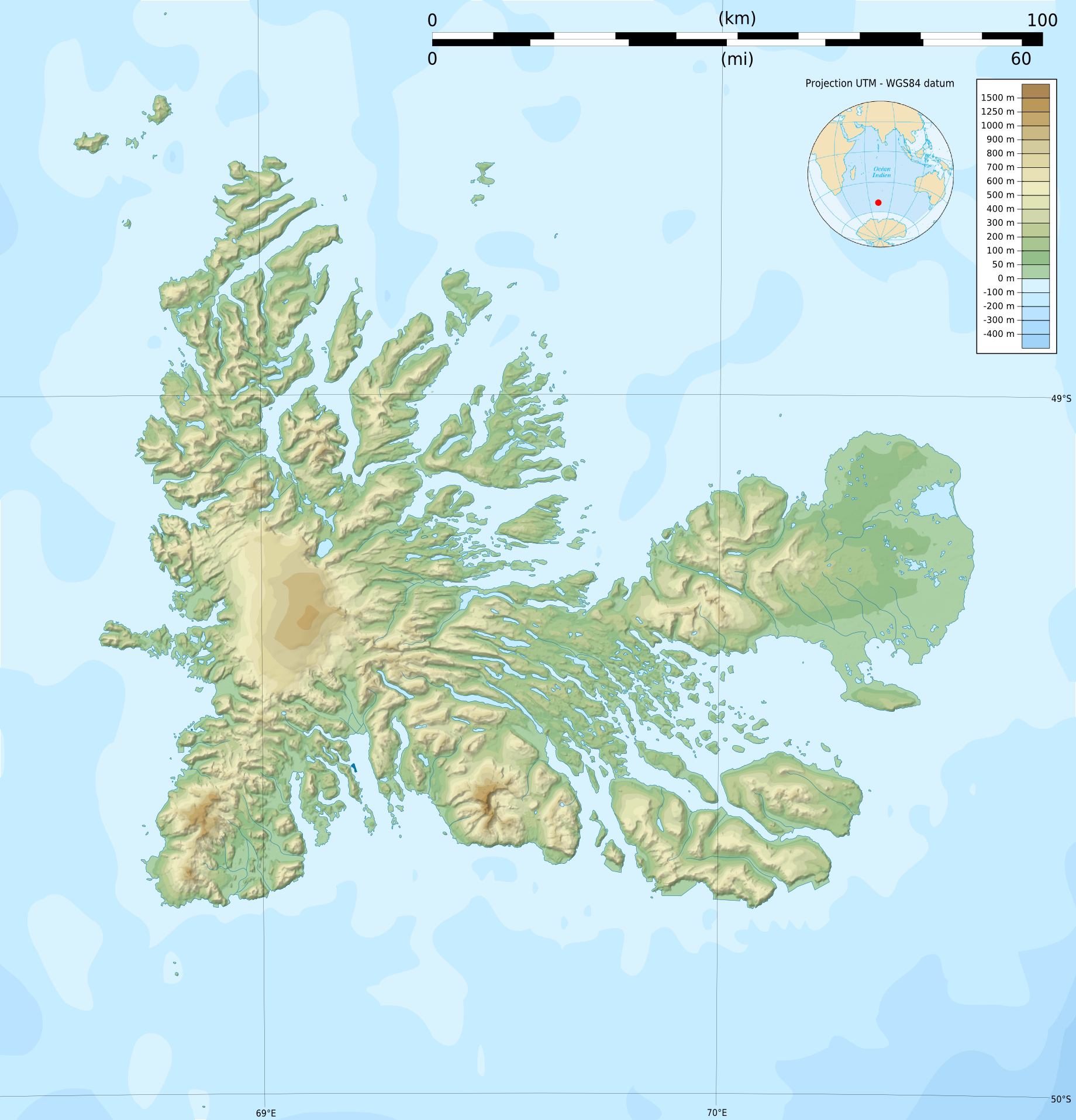
- Location within Kerguelen

Geography
- Location: Grande Terre, Kerguelen Islands
- Coordinates: 49°03′06″S 69°06′52″E
- Adjacent to: Baie Laissez-Porter; Baie du Français
- Length: 18 km (11.2 mi)
- Width: 12 km (7.5 mi)
- Highest elevation: 1,081 m (3547 ft)
- Highest point: Mont Richards

Administration
- France
- French Southern and Antarctic Lands

Demographics
- Population: 0

The Société de Géographie Peninsula (French: Presqu'île de la Société de Géographie [pʁɛskil də la sɔsjete də ʒeɔɡʁafi]) is a peninsula in the Kerguelen Islands, French Southern and Antarctic Lands.

It was named in 1913 or 1914 by Raymond Rallier du Baty and his brother Henri Rallier du Baty in honor of the Société de Géographie, which had sponsored their expedition. It first appeared with this name on a map in 1922.

== Geography ==
The peninsula is mountainous. Its highest point is Mont Richards, rising to a height of 1,081 metres (3,547 ft) above sea level. The largest water body is Lac Virgule.

== See also ==
- Toponymy of the Kerguelen Islands
