= Mont Richards =

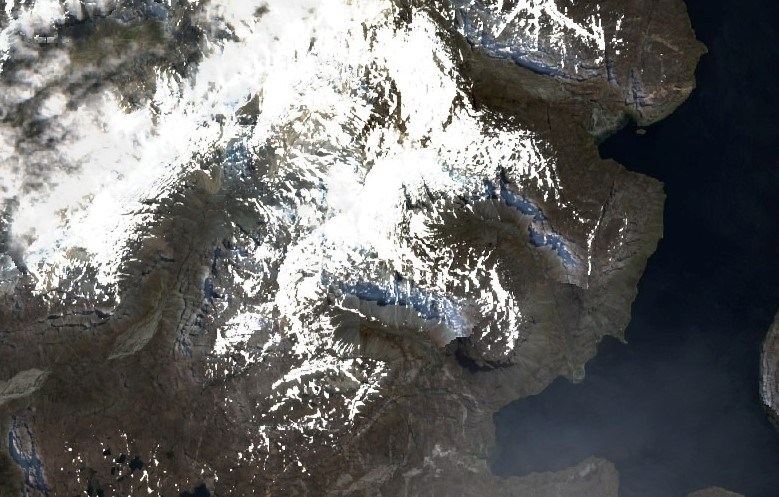
- Sentinel-2 picture centered on Mont Richards

Highest point
- Elevation: 1,081 m (3,547 ft)
- Prominence: 963 m (3,159 ft)
- Coordinates: 49°05′08″S 69°07′53″E

Geography
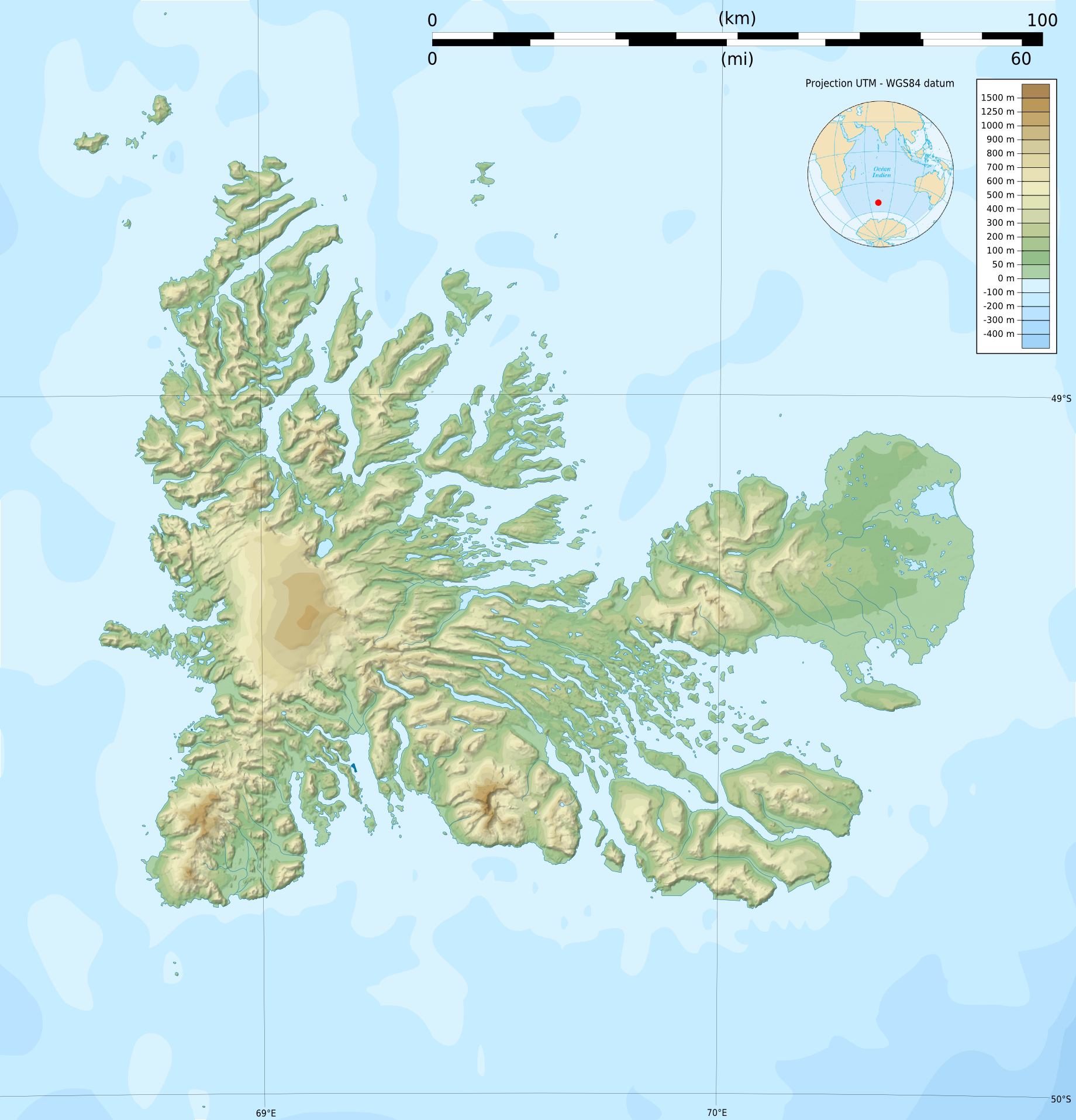
- Location within Kerguelen
- Location: Grande Terre, Kerguelen Islands, French Southern and Antarctic Lands

Climbing
- First ascent: Unknown

Mont Richards is a mountain in the French Southern and Antarctic Lands. Located in the Société de Géographie Peninsula, Kerguelen, it rises to a height of 1,081 metres (3,547 ft) above sea level.

Mont Richards is the highest point of the Société de Géographie Peninsula. It rises in the southeastern sector of the peninsula, not far from the isthmus.

This mountain was named in 1874 during the Challenger expedition after R. R. A. Richards, the steward of HMS Challenger.

== See also ==
- Toponymy of the Kerguelen Islands
