= Géomorphologie =

- Discipline: Geomorphology
- Language: French, English

Publication details
- History: 1995-present
- Publisher: Paris Groupe Français de Géomorphologie (France)
- Frequency: quarterly

Standard abbreviations
- ISO 4: Géomorphologie

Indexing
- ISSN: 1266-5304 (print); 1957-777X (web)
- OCLC no.: 827302817

Links
- Journal homepage; Online access

Géomorphologie: Relief, Processus, Environnement is a quarterly peer-reviewed scientific journal covering research on geomorphology and allied disciplines such as archaeology, physical geography, ecology and other Earth sciences.
