= Pierre George =

French geographer

- Born: 11 October 1909
- Died: 11 September 2006 (aged 96)

Pierre George (11 October 1909 – 11 September 2006) was a French geographer.

George was a member of the French Communist Party and his Marxist beliefs informed his work on economic geography.
