= Paul Vidal de La Blache =

French geographer

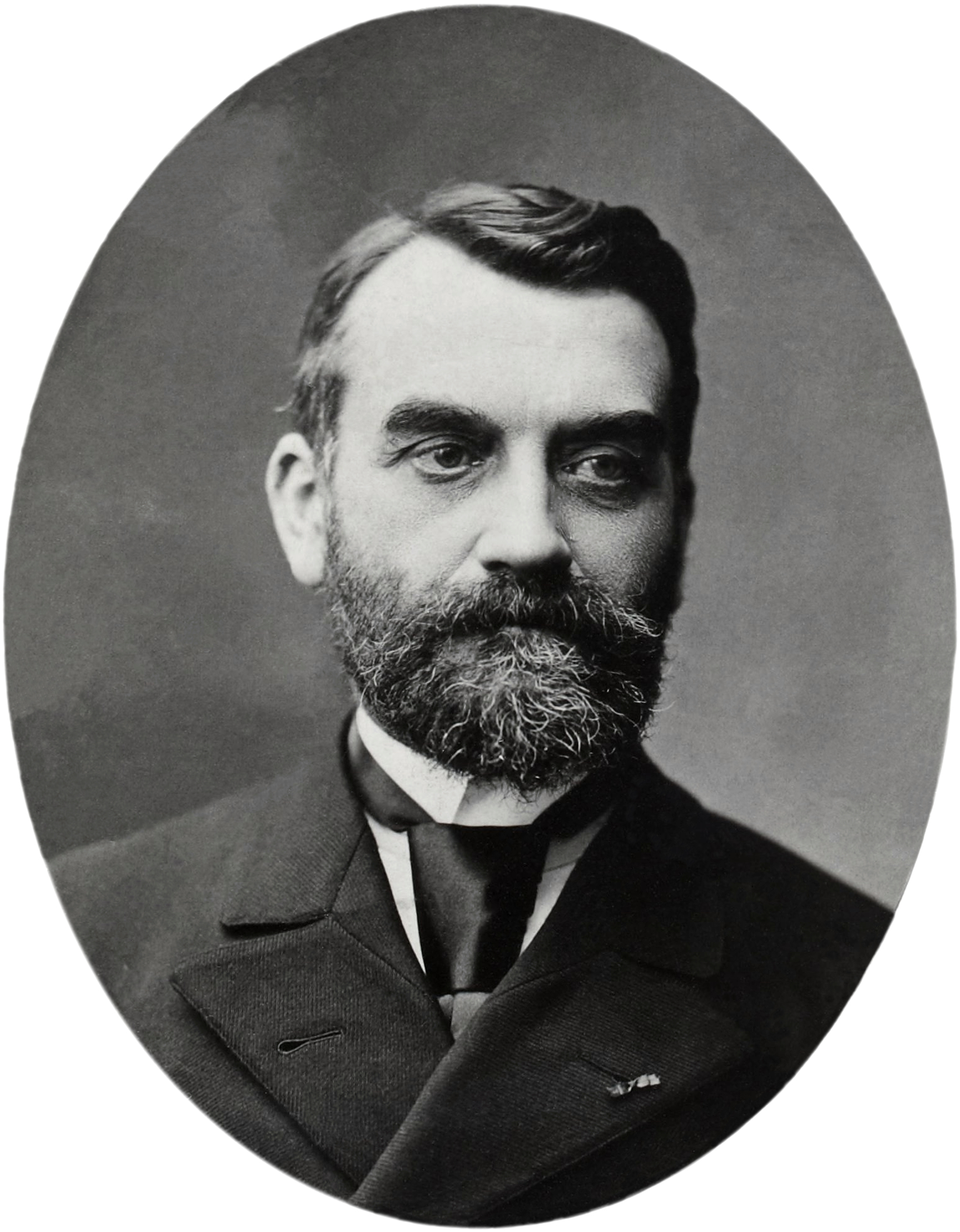
Paul Vidal de La Blache

Paul Vidal de La Blache (French pronunciation: [pɔl vidal də la blaʃ], Pézenas, Hérault, 22 January 1845 – Tamaris-sur-Mer, Provence-Alpes-Côte d'Azur, 5 April 1918) was a French geographer. He is considered to be the founder of modern French geography and also the founder of the French School of Geopolitics. He conceived the idea of genre de vie, which is the belief that the lifestyle of a particular region reflects the economic, social, ideological and psychological identities imprinted on the landscape.

== Life ==
Paul Vidal de la Blache was the son of a teacher at the Collège de Pézenas who subsequently became an academic administrator. He was sent to school at the Institution Favard at the Lycée Charlemagne in Paris. Afterward, he attended the École Normale Supérieure. He entered the École Normale Supérieure in 1863 at the age of eighteen and received the agrégation (certification) in history and geography in 1866. He was appointed to the École française d’Athens, taking advantage of the opportunity to travel in Italy, Palestine, and Egypt (in the latter, being present at the inauguration of the Suez Canal). There he studied Greek archeology for three years.

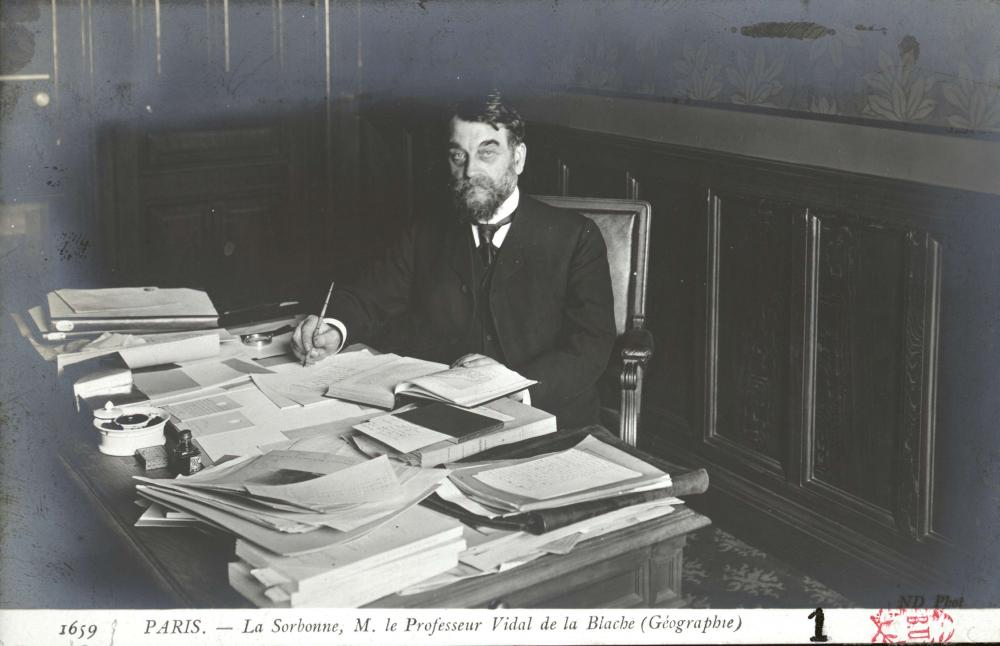
The Sorbonne. Professor Vidal de La Blache – Geography (Bibliothèque de La Sorbonne, NuBIS)

Upon returning to France, in 1870 he married Laure Marie Elizabeth Mondont, with whom he had five children. He held several teaching positions, notably at the Lycée d'Angers and at the École Préparatoire de l'Enseignment Supérieur des Lettres et des Sciences. La Blache received his doctorate at the Sorbonne in 1872 with a dissertation in ancient history, afterwards published as Hérode Atticus: étude critique sur sa vie. He began working at the Nancy-Université. Vidal de la Blache returned to the École Normale Supérieure in 1877 as a full Professor of Geography and taught there for the next 21 years. He transferred to the Université de Paris, where he continued teaching until he retired in 1909, at the age of 64.

Vidal de la Blache founded the French school of geography and, together with Marcel Dubois and Lucien Gallois, the Annales de Géographie (1893), of which he was the editor until his death. The Annales de Géographie became an influential academic journal that promoted the concept of human geography as the study of man and his relationship to his environment. Vidal de la Blache's pupil Albert Demangeon was deeply influenced by his emphasis on the importance of historical influences in the study of geography, and went on to become France's leading French academic in the field of human geography. During World War I (1914–18) in January 1915 the Geographical Commission was established in close liaison with the 2nd Bureau of the Army Staff with six geographers, Albert Demangeon, Lucien Gallois, Emmanuel de Martonne, Emmanuel de Margerie, Louis Raveneau and Paul Vidal de la Blache. Antoine Vacher contributed intermittently to the work of the Commission.

== Works ==
Vidal de la Blache produced a large number of publications; including 17 books, 107 articles, and 240 reports and reviews. Only some of these have been translated into English. His most influential works included an elementary textbook Collection de Cartes Murales Accompagnées de Notices along with Histoire et Géographie: Atlas General and La France de l'Est. Two of his best-known writings are Tableau de la Géographie de la France (1903) and Principles of Human Geography (1918).

== The "Vidalian" program ==
The Tableau de la Geographie de la France was a summary of Vidal's methods, a manifesto whose production required a dozen years of work. It surveyed the entire country, taking note of everything he had observed in his innumerable notebooks. He took an interest in human and political aspects, geology (an infant discipline at the time, little connected with geography), transportation, and history. He was the first to tie together all those domains in a somewhat quantitative approach, using numbers sparingly, essentially narrative, even descriptive—not far removed, in some ways from a guidebook or a manual for landscape painting.

Influenced by German thought, especially by Friedrich Ratzel whom he had met in Germany, Vidal has been linked to the term "possibilism", which he never used but which summed up conveniently his opposition to the determinism of the sort that was defended by some nineteenth century geographers. The concept of possibilism has been used by historians to evoke the epistemological fuzziness that, according to them, characterized the approach of Vidal's school. Described as "idiographic", this approach was seen as blocking the evolution of the discipline in a "nomothetic" direction that would be the result of experimentation, making it possible to unlock laws or make scientific demonstrations.

Vidal published a visionary article on the regions of France in 1910. He had been requested by the Prime Minister, Aristide Briand, to create some regional groupings with representative organs. Vidal proposed to cut France into regions organized around a metropolis. The economic realities of the modern world, with worldwide competition and the shrinking of the planet due to accelerated communications, made him think that less centralized, less static modes of organization ought to be promoted.

"Vidalian" geography is based on varied forms of cartography, on monographs, and on several notable concepts, including "landscapes" (paysages), "settings" (milieux), "regions", "lifeways" (genres de vie), and "density". Many of the master's students, particularly in their dissertations, produced regional geographies that were both physical and human (even economic). The context chosen for these descriptions was a region, whose contours were not always very firmly fixed scientifically. Undoubtedly because this approach was more structured, many of Vidal's successors, and still more those of Martonne, specialized in a geomorphology that became gradually stronger, but that also, by its narrowness, weakened French geography.

Between the two world wars, "classical geography" stayed in the mold established by the Vidalian tradition. It was defended by an establishment that marginalized all attempts at epistemological renewal, to such an extent that after World War II the discipline was at the same stage where it had been left at Vidal's death. Arguably, his disciples were bound to a particular aspect of the master's thought and did not know how to deal with complexity and growth, and as a consequence the field of the discipline shrank. An immutable triad imposed itself on research and university studies: physical geography (Martonne, Baulig), regional geography (Blanchard, Cholley), and human geography (Brunhes, Demangeon, Sorre); in descending order of frequency and importance geomorphology, then rural geography, regional geography, and finally tropical geography.

This classical geography—naturalistic, monographic, morphological, literary, and didactic—would experience a rapid renewal and a radical transformation into a social science with the revolution of the 1960s and 1970s and the rise of urban and industrial studies.

== Criticism of Vidalian geography ==
Some adherents to modern geography as the science of the social dimension of space have criticized Vidal's geography as the natural science of lifeways. According to this view, Vidal's ideas made nature the external force that drove societies. They served to validate the equation of nation, territory, and sovereignty, and the fundamental idea of the French Third Republic that patriotism was the supreme value. The reasoning that made nature the driving force for societies was only tenable in regard to rural and seemingly static societies. Vidal avoided looking at industrialization, colonialism, and urbanization. He called those concepts "historical winds", like gusts on the surface of a pond. As he himself wrote at the end of his Tableau de la géographie de la France, "Close study of what is fixed and permanent in the geographical conditions of France ought to be or to become more than ever our guide."

Why was Vidalian geography so triumphant in France up to 1950? A notable explanation is that French thought during the Third Republic was dominated by nationalism, which was, arguably, a means of controlling the populations. History saw itself as being given the role of showing the emergence of the nation, and geography's role was not to refer to politics. A nearly static society could be explained by a static nature. Vidal's ideas formed the main paradigm for the geographical science of the epoch, controlling the universities, the research centers, and the granting of degrees. Urban thinkers had no place in France until 1950, which explains why geographers such as Jean Gottmann left France to make their careers in the United States.
