= Hugh Clout =

Hugh Donald Clout (born 29 April 1944) is a British historical and rural geographer and emeritus professor of geography at University College London (UCL). His research focuses on the historical geography of France, rural landscapes and regional development, postwar reconstruction, and the history of geographical scholarship. He is an Emeritus Fellow of the British Academy, a Fellow of University College London, and the Academia Europaea.

== Education and Career ==
He earned a BA, MPhil and PhD from University College London, a Doctorat from the Université Paris I, and a DLit from the University of London. Sorbonne University later awarded him an honorary doctorate.

Clout joined University College London's Department of Geography as a lecturer in 1967 and later became professor of geography. He introduced rural geography teaching at UCL in the late 1960s and served as Dean of Social and Historical Sciences from 1995 to 2004. He was elected a Fellow of the British Academy in 1997 and a Fellow of UCL in 2008. In 2005, he shared the Newbigin Prize of the Royal Scottish Geographical Society with Iain Stevenson.

== Research and scholarly work ==
Clout's research has focused on rural and historical geography, particularly France and Western Europe. His books include Agriculture in France on the Eve of the Railway Age (1980), The Land of France, 1815–1914 (1983) and After the Ruins: Restoring the Countryside of Northern France after the Great War (1996), which examined agricultural change and postwar reconstruction.

He has also written on French geographers, the history of geographical thought and the development of geography as an academic discipline. His other works include Histoire de Londres and The Times History of London.
