= Lucien Gallois =

French geographer

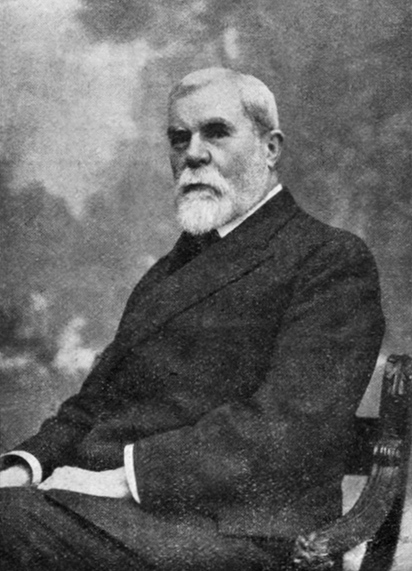
Lucien Gallois (before 1929)

Lucien Louis Joseph Gallois (21 February 1857 – 21 March 1941) was a French geographer born in Metz.

He was a student at the École Normale Supérieure in Paris, where he took classes from Paul Vidal de la Blache (1845–1918). In 1884 he received his agrégation, later becoming a lecturer at the Sorbonne (1893). From 1898 to 1907 he was a professor of geography at the École Normale Supérieure, and afterwards a professor at the Sorbonne, where he remained until his retirement in 1927.

Gallois made major contributions to the Annales de géographie, a geographical journal that he co-founded with his mentor, Paul Vidal de la Blache. Following the death of Vidal de la Blache in 1918, he assumed directorship of Géographie universelle, a major project involving regional geography of the entire world.

Gallois had a keen interest in the fields of cartography and history of geography, as made evident by an influential 1890 study on German geographers of the Renaissance titled Les géographes allemands de la Renaissance. Another noted publication of his was Régions naturelles et noms de pays: Étude sur la région Parisienne (Natural regions and country names: A study of the Paris region).
