= Albert Demangeon =

French academic (1872-1940)

- Born: 13 June 1872; Cormeilles, Eure, France
- Died: 25 July 1940 (aged 68); Paris, France
- Occupation: Professor of economic geography

Albert Demangeon (13 June 1872 – 25 July 1940) was a Professor of social geography at the Sorbonne in Paris for many years. He was an educator, a prolific author, and in the 1930s was the leading French academic in the field of human geography. He was a pioneer in the use of surveys to collect information on social questions.

== Life ==
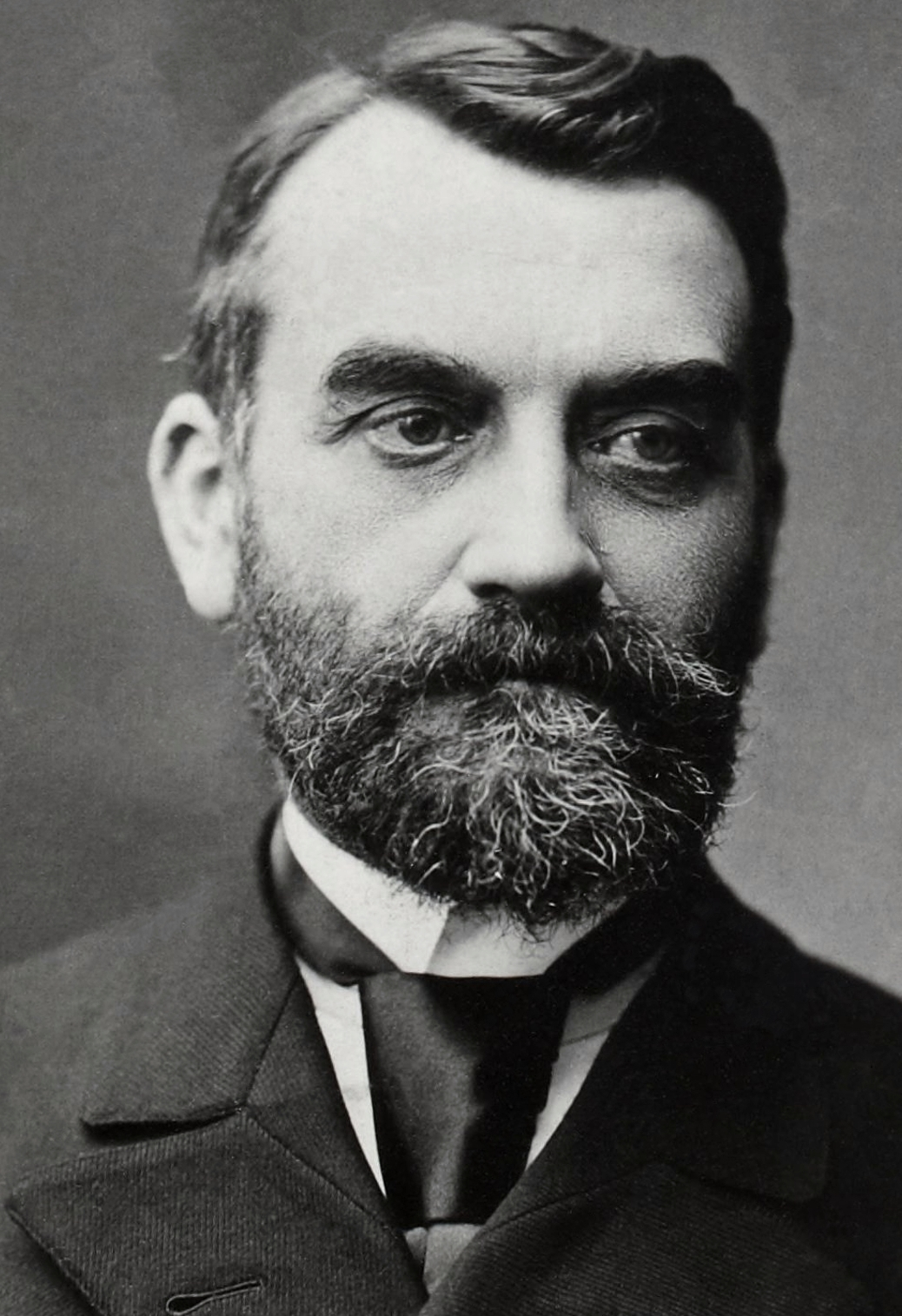
Paul Vidal de La Blache (1845–1918), Demangeon's teacher

Albert Demangeon was born on 13 June 1872 in Cormeilles, Eure, France. His parents were not well off but Albert was an outstanding student and won admission to the École Normale Supérieure in 1892. There he became interested in geography and in the teachings of Paul Vidal de La Blache. He graduated in geography in 1895 and became a teacher in a secondary school. He later was employed in the École Normale Supérieure preparing students for the Agrégation.

Demangeon presented his thesis on Picardy in 1905, considered a model of a regional monograph. He obtained a teaching post at the University of Lille. He collaborated with Antoine Vacher, Joseph Blayac and others on their Dictionnaire-manuel illustré de géographie (1907). The book received hostile reviews, and Demangeon seems to have accused Vacher of sabotaging the project. From 1911 he taught in Paris at the Sorbonne. During World War I (1914–18) Demangeon served in the geographical corps of the army and drafted memos for the army staff. Towards the end of the war he was a member of the committee studying preparation for peace. The "section géographique française" helped define the policies that France would follow after the war on territorial arrangements.

Demangeon returned to the Sorbonne after the war. He was Professor of economic geography at the Faculty of Letters from 1925 to 1940. He served on the editorial board of the Revue d'Histoire Moderne, which was relaunched in 1926. By 1927 he was one of the directors of Armand Colin's Annales de Géographie. Demangeon was noted as a university teacher, and also contributed to primary education. He was responsible for a well known collection of secondary school textbooks. In the mid-1930 he taught at the École des hautes études commerciales de Paris (HEC). One of his students was the future economist Albert O. Hirschman, who recorded that he gave "brilliant lectures", and used large and colorful maps to illustrate his themes of commerce and trade between geographical regions, and the resulting economic rivalries. Demangeon acted as an arbitrator in social conflicts at the time of the Popular Front (1936–38).

Demangeon's daughter Suzanne married the geographer Aimé Vincent Perpillou (1902–76), who also became a distinguished economic geographer. Albert Demangeon died on 25 July 1940 in Paris, France.

== Work ==
Demangeon was a prolific author. His pre-war work focused on physical regional geography, but later he also wrote on larger topics including several volumes of the Géographie Universelle published under the direction of Paul Vidal de La Blache and Lucien Gallois. At the Sorbonne he turned from physical to human geography. He avoided theoretical work, and did not write a book about the general subject of human geography, although his writings on the subject were published after his death in Problems of Human Geography (1942). This collection of his main articles covered a broad spectrum of human geography topics.

Demangeon was interested in the interactions of man and nature, and also in history, although he felt that geography must remain a distinct subject. He wrote in 1906, "To explain the geographical phenomena of which man has been the witness or contriver, it is necessary to study their evolution in the past with the aid of documents." Later he defined three principles for the study of human geography:

1. It should avoid determinism. Causes are always complex and involve human initiative and choice.
2. It should be based upon a territorial unit. To understand and describe regional units is one of the main objectives of geographical study.
3. It must consider not only the present day. The idea of age and of evolution is indispensable. Without it, the reason for what exists often escapes us.

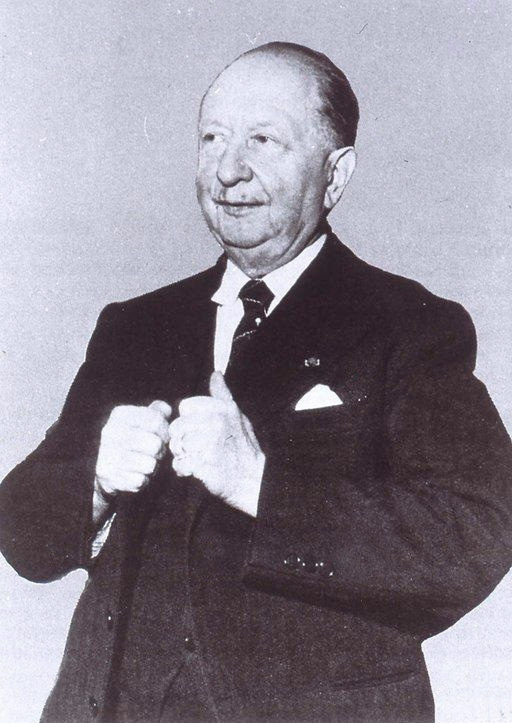
Lucien Febvre (1878–1956) co-authored The Rhine, Problems of History and Economy (1935)

Demangeon's 1905 study of Picardy had a strong historical element, reflecting Vidal de la Blache's emphasis on the role of man in changing the face of the earth. Also in 1905 he produced a valuable guide to the National Archives for the use of geographers. He cooperated with historians, and coauthored The Rhine, Problems of History and Economy (1935) with Lucien Febvre. He studied current issues such as colonialism, globalization, the Great Depression and German ambitions. His Le déclin de l'Europe (1920) was published in the US in 1921 under the title America and the Race for World Domination. It argued that Europe was deeply in debt and exhausted by the war, with reduced agricultural and industrial output, and low birth rates. The US and Japan had expanded their industries, replaced Europe's exports with their own, and were owed huge sums in exchange for the supplies they had shipped to Europe during the war.

Demangeon wrote several studies of cities, but was more interested in the country, and also in economics. Throughout his career Demangeon was interested in spatial variations of farmsteads. He presented a famous study of rural houses to the 1st International Congress of Folklore in 1937. His two-volume work France Économique et Humaine, published posthumously in 1944 and 1948, surveyed the rural life and economy, road, railway and canal routes and their traffic, coastal and inland towns, industry and Paris. There are in-depth surveys of agriculture, towns and industry for each region. Throughout the work there is a historical flavour with references to evolution of land use, development of routes, evolution of industry, changes to urban area.

Demangeon used a precise vocabulary and linked observed facts in order to formulate new questions. He made use of questionnaires to investigate patterns as early as 1909. In the 1930s he used questionnaires in large surveys for a 1939 study of foreigners in French agriculture. The surveys, sponsored by the Rockefeller Institute, gathered information on rural habitat, the organization of farms and the use of foreign farm labour.

== Works ==
=== Major works ===
Major work by Demangeon include:

- Albert Demangeon (1905), La Picardie et les régions voisines. Artois, Cambrésis, Beauvaisis, Paris: Armand Colin, p. 496
- Albert Demangeon; Joseph Blayac; Isidore Gallaud; Jules Sion; Antoine Vacher (1907), Dictionnaire-manuel illustré de géographie, Paris: Armand Colin, p. 860
- Albert Demangeon (1920), Le déclin de l'Europe, Paris: Payot, p. 314
- Albert Demangeon (1923), L'Empire britannique. Etude de géographie coloniale, Paris: Armand Colin, p. 280
- Albert Demangeon (1927), Les Iles Britanniques, Géographie universelle, vol. I, Paris: Armand Colin, p. 320
- Albert Demangeon (1927), Belgique, Pays-Bas, Luxembourg, Géographie universelle, vol. II, Paris: Armand Colin, p. 250
- Albert Demangeon (1933), Paris, la ville et sa banlieue, Paris: Bourrelier, p. 62
- Albert Demangeon; Lucien Febvre (1935), Le Rhin. Problèmes d'histoire et d'économie, Paris: Armand Colin, p. 304
- Albert Demangeon; Alfred Weiler (1937), Les maisons des hommes de la hutte au gratte-ciel, Paris: Bourrelier, p. 127
- Albert Demangeon (1942), Problèmes de géographie humaine, Paris: Armand Colin, p. 408
- Albert Demangeon (1946–1948), La France économique et humaine, Géographie universelle, vol. VI, 2nd & 3rd volumes, Paris: Armand Colin, p. 900

=== Pre-war 1895–1912 ===
- Léo Claretie; Albert Demangeon (1895), Galerie française. Eure, Paris: Curel, Gougis et Cie
- Albert Demangeon (1905), Les Sources de la géographie de la France aux Archives nationales, Paris: Bellais
- Albert Demangeon (1910), "Impressions d'Irlande", Bulletin de la Société normande de géographie, Rouen: A. Lestringant
- Albert Demangeon (1911), Eléments de Géographie par l'image, Paris: Librairie de l'Enseignement
- Albert Demangeon (1912), Esquisse géographique de la région du Nord, Lille: C. Robbe

=== Post-war 1930–1939 ===
- Albert Demangeon (1931), Troisième rapport de la commission de l'habitat rural, préparé pour le congrès international de géographie, Paris, 1931, Florence: Bureau du secrétariat Général
- Albert Demangeon (1932), "Excursion B 1. L'ouest de l'Ile-de-France et la Normandie", Congrès international de géographie. Paris, 1931, Orléans, Paris: H. Tessier, Armand Colin
- Albert Demangeon (1932–1938), France, métropole et colonies, Paris: Librairie de l'Enseignement : Camille Sauty
- Albert Demangeon; Charles Robequain (1933), L'Afrique du Nord genres de vie et peuplement, Paris: Librairie de l'enseignement
- Albert Demangeon (1933), Les pays du Nord: vie industrielle et urbaine, Paris: Librairie de l'enseignement
- Albert Demangeon (1933), Les pays du Nord: paysages, vie rurale, Paris: Librairie de l'enseignement
- André Cholley; Albert Demangeon (1933), Région parisienne: Paris, environs, Paris: Librairie de l'enseignement
- Albert Demangeon; Charles Robequain (1933), L'Afrique du Nord régions et paysages, Paris: Librairie de l'enseignement
- André Cholley; Albert Demangeon (1933), Paris et l'agglomération parisienne: Paris, environs, Paris: Librairie de l'enseignement
- Albert Demangeon (1934), Paris et le département de la Seine, Paris: Bourrelier
- Albert Demangeon; Charles Robequain (1934), L'Indochine française: les montagnes, Paris: Librairie de l'enseignement
- Albert Demangeon; Charles Robequain (1934), L'Indochine française: les plaines, Paris: Librairie de l'enseignement
- André Cholley; Albert Demangeon; Charles Robequain (1935), L'Afrique Équatoriale Française, Paris: Camille Sauty
- André Cholley; Albert Demangeon; Charles Robequain (1935), L'Afrique Occidentale Française, Paris: Camille Sauty
- André Cholley; Albert Demangeon (1935), Les pays de l'Ouest: paysages et vie rurale, Paris: Librairie de l'enseignement
- André Cholley; Albert Demangeon (1935), Les pays de l'Ouest: vie maritime et urbaine, Paris: Librairie de l'enseignement
- André Cholley; Albert Demangeon (1935), Provence, Paris: Librairie de l'enseignement
- André Cholley; Albert Demangeon (1935), Les Alpes l'économie alpestre, Paris: Camille Sauty
- André Cholley; Albert Demangeon (1935), Massif Central, Paris: Librairie de l'enseignement
- André Cholley; Albert Demangeon (1935), Le Midi méditerranéen: Languedoc, Roussillon, Corse, Paris: Libr. de l'enseignement, Camille Sauty
- André Cholley; Albert Demangeon; Charles Robequain (1936), États du Levant. Colonies d'Amérique et du Pacifique. Établissements de l'Inde. Djibouti, Paris: Camille Sauty
- Albert Demangeon; André Meynier (1936), Géographie générale, Amérique, Australasie, Coulommiers, Paris: Brodard et Taupin, Hachette
- André Cholley; Albert Demangeon; Charles Robequain (1936), Madagascar. La Réunion, Paris: Camille Sauty
- Albert Demangeon; Aimé Perpillou (1937), Géographie générale, Paris: Hachette
- Albert Demangeon; Aimé Perpillou (1937), Asie. Insulinde. Afrique: Classe de cinquième, Paris: Hachette
- André Cholley; Albert Demangeon (1937), Les Pays de la Loire, Paris: Camille Sauty
- André Cholley; Albert Demangeon (1937), Les pays de la Saône et du Rhône, le Jura, Paris: Camille Sauty
- André Cholley; Albert Demangeon (1937), Les pays du Sud-Ouest, Paris: Camille Sauty
- Raymond Aron; Albert Demangeon; Jean Meuvret (1937), Les sciences sociales en France: enseignement et recherche, Paris: P. Hartmann
- Albert Demangeon; Louis François (1938), La France, Paris: Hachette
- Albert Demangeon; André Meynier (1939), L'Europe, Paris: Hachette
- Albert Demangeon (1939), Types de peuplement rural en France
- Albert Demangeon (1939), Géographie. L'Économie française, Coulommiers, Paris: Brodard et Taupin, Hachette
- Albert Demangeon; Georges Mauco (1939), Documents pour servir à l'étude des étrangers dans l'agriculture française, Paris: Hermann

=== Later works ===
- Albert Demangeon; Louis François (1941), Géographie. La région méditerranéenne, Paris: Hachette
- Albert Demangeon (1946), France économique et humaine, Paris: A. Colin
- Albert Demangeon (1946), Géographie, Paris: Hachette
- Albert Demangeon (1946), Géographie. La Région parisienne, Paris: Hachette
- Albert Demangeon (1948), Géographie économique et humaine de la France. Tome second..., Paris: A. Colin
- Albert Demangeon; Aimé Perpillou (1948), Le Monde moins l'Europe, Paris: Hachette
- Albert Demangeon; Louis François (1949), La France et la France d'outre-mer, Paris: Hachette
- Albert Demangeon; Aimé Perpillou (1949), Le Monde, Paris: Hachette
- Albert Demangeon; Louis François (1952), L'Union française: France et Outre-mer, Paris: Hachette
- Albert Demangeon; Aimé Perpillou (1952), Géographie humaine, Paris: Hachette

== Sources ==
- Adelman, Jeremy (2013-04-07), Worldly Philosopher: The Odyssey of Albert O. Hirschman, Princeton University Press, ISBN 978-1-4008-4684-9
- "Albert Demangeon", Encyclopédie Larousse (in French), Éditions Larousse
- Blouet, Brian (2001), Geopolitics and Globalization in the Twentieth Century, Reaktion Books, ISBN 978-1-86189-085-6
- Darby, Henry Clifford (2002), The Relations of History and Geography: Studies in England, France and the United States, University of Exeter Press, ISBN 978-0-85989-699-3
- Demangeon, Albert (1872-1940), BnF: Bibliothèque nationale de France
- Friedman, Susan W. (2004-11-11), Marc Bloch, Sociology and Geography: Encountering Changing Disciplines, Cambridge University Press, ISBN 978-0-521-61215-9
- Lorimer, Hayden; Withers, Charles W. J. (2012-09-27), Geographers - Biobibliographical Studies, A&C Black, ISBN 978-1-4411-8624-9
- Mondal, P. (26 January 2014), "Biography Albert Demangeon Geographer", Your Article Library
- Wolff, Denis (5 July 2014), "Albert Demangeon", Hypergeo
