= Annales de Géographie =

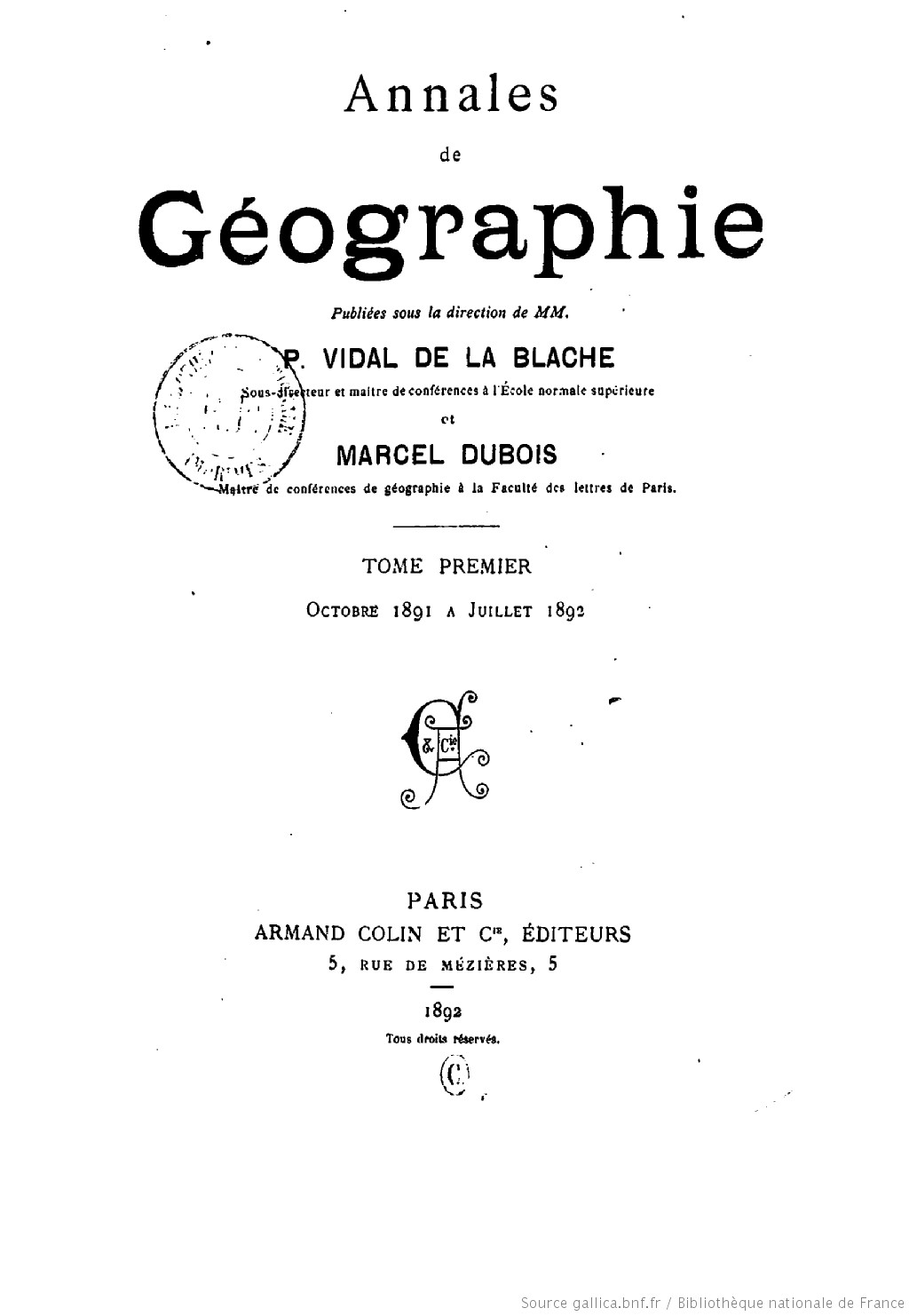
- Cover of the first issue
- Discipline: Geography
- Language: French

Publication details
- History: First edition: 15 October 1891
- Publisher: Armand Colin (France)
- Frequency: Bi-monthly

Standard abbreviations
- ISO 4: Ann. Géogr.

Indexing
- ISSN: 0003-4010 (print); 1777-5884 (web)

The Annales de Géographie is a French journal devoted to geography, first published in 1891.

== History ==
The Annales de Géographie was founded in 1891 by Paul Vidal de La Blache (1845–1918). It was published by Armand Colin from the first edition until the present. From 1893 to 1915 the journal contained a yearly Bibliographie de l'année (Bibliography of the Year). Until 1946 the title on the cover was Annales de géographie, Bulletin de la Société de géographie. With volume 282 (April/May 1941) the journal absorbed the society's La Géographie (1900). It did not appear in 1944. The Société de géographie's bulletin was published independently from 1947 under the title Acta geographica.

== Coverage ==
The Annales de Géographie became an influential academic journal that promoted the concept of human geography as the study of man and his relationship to his environment. Vidal de la Blache's pupil Albert Demangeon was deeply influenced by his emphasis on the importance of historical influences in the study of geography, and went on to become France's leading French academic in the field of human geography. Demangeon was one of the directors of the journal by 1927. The journal takes a general view of geography, discussing the different aspects and approaches. It also publishes relevant articles on related subjects including ecology, history, economics and law.

== Editors ==
Editors included:

- 1891–1918 Paul Vidal de La Blache (1845–1918)
- 1891–1895 Marcel Dubois (1856–1916)
- 1896–1926 Emmanuel de Margerie (1862–1953).
- 1897–1919 Louis Raveneau (1865–1937)

== Sources ==
- "Annales de géographie", BnF: Bibliotheque nationale de France, A. Colin, 1891
- "Annales de Géographie", JSTOR
- Friedman, Susan W. (2004-11-11), Marc Bloch, Sociology and Geography: Encountering Changing Disciplines, Cambridge University Press, ISBN 978-0-521-61215-9
- Knox, Paul L.; Marston, Sallie A. (2015), Human Geography
- Wolff, Denis, "Albert Demangeon", Hypergeo
