= Antoine Bailly =

Swiss geographer (1944–2021)

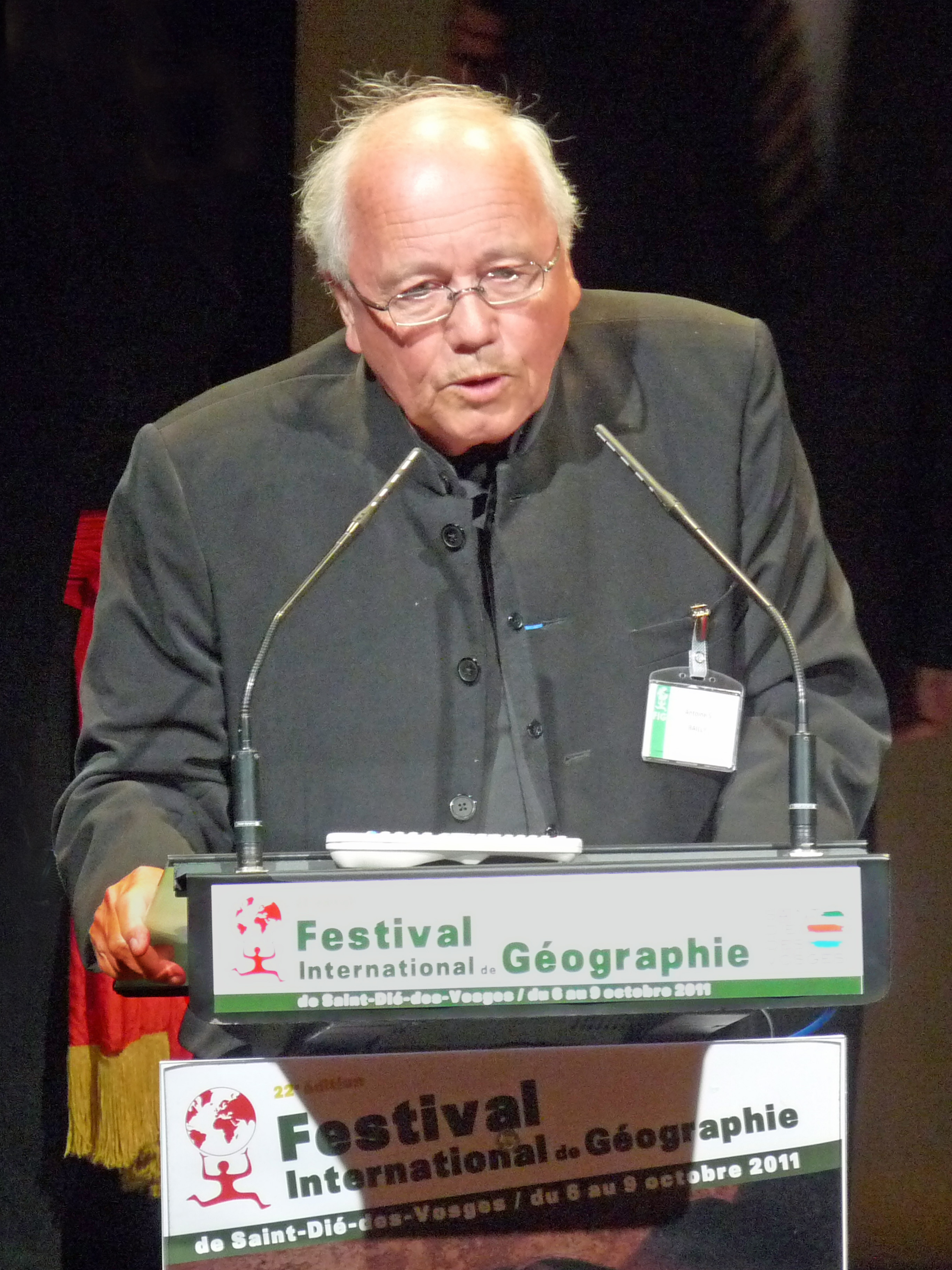
- Bailly in 2011
- Born: 4 July 1944; Belfort, France
- Died: 26 June 2021 (aged 76)
- Occupation: Geographer

Antoine Bailly (4 July 1944 – 26 June 2021) was a French-born Swiss geographer. He worked as a professor of geography in France, Canada, and Switzerland. He held a doctoral degree from Paris-Sorbonne University, as well as degrees from the University of Pennsylvania and the University of Franche-Comté.

== Biography ==
Bailly was the co-author of over 30 books and more than 300 articles in the fields of geography and regional science. He drew inspiration from Walter Isard, Peter Gould, and Paul Claval and was one of the pioneers of geographical representation and regional medicometrics. He was a co-founder of the École suisse de nouvelle géographie alongside Jean-Bernard Racine and Claval.

Bailly received the Founder's Medal from the Regional Science Association International, the highest distinction in regional science, in 2008. On 6 October 2011, he was awarded the Vautrin Lud Prize as part of the International Festival of Geography. He was given a doctor honoris causa from Alexandru Ioan Cuza University, the University of Lisbon, the Université du Québec, and the Hungarian Academy of Sciences. In 2000, he was made a Knight of the Ordre national du Mérite. In 2021, he was nominated for membership into the Lisbon Academy of Sciences.

Antoine Bailly died on 26 June 2021 at the age of 76.
