= Adam Tickell =

British economic geographer (born 1965)

Adam Tickell FAcSS
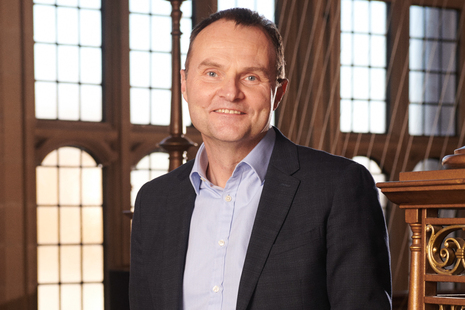

Vice Chancellor of the University of Birmingham
- Incumbent
- Assumed office January 2022
- Preceded by: David Eastwood

Vice Chancellor and President of the University of Sussex
- In office September 2016 – December 2021
- Preceded by: Michael Farthing
- Succeeded by: David Maguire

Personal details
- Born: 1965 (age 60–61)
- Education: University of Manchester (BA, MA, PhD)

Academic background
- Thesis: The Social Regulation of Banking: Restructuring Foreign Banks in Manchester and London (1992)

Academic work
- Discipline: Geography
- Sub-discipline: Economic geography
- Institutions: University of Bristol; Royal Holloway; University of Sussex; University of Birmingham

Adam Tickell FAcSS (born 1965) is a British economic geographer, whose work explores finance, English local governance, and the politics of ideas. He is Vice-Chancellor of the University of Birmingham, and was formerly Vice-Chancellor of the University of Sussex. He also edited the Transactions of the Institute of British Geographers.

== Background ==
Adam Tickell obtained a first-class degree in Geography in 1987 from the University of Manchester and a PhD from the same institution on the social regulation of banking.

Tickell moved jobs frequently, holding positions and professorships at the universities of Bristol, Leeds, Southampton, Birmingham and Royal Holloway, University of London.

At the University of Bristol, from 2000, he became research director of the Faculty of Social Sciences and Law. Simultaneously, he was the vice chair of the Research Grants Board of the Economic and Social Research Council (ESRC).

He later joined Royal Holloway, becoming dean and vice-principal. He joined the University of Birmingham in 2011, becoming provost and vice-principal. He became the vice-chancellor of the University of Sussex in 2016. He became vice-chancellor of the University of Birmingham in January 2022.

He is the current chair of Universities UK Open Access Implementation Group.

Launched in March 2021, Tickell led a review, on behalf of the Department for Business, Energy & Industrial Strategy, with an overarching goal 'to advise on a substantial reduction in unnecessary research bureaucracy in government and the wider sector, supporting researchers to focus on research and related activities which contribute to a healthy research base”.

In July 2022, Tickell released The Independent Review of Research Bureaucracy having been asked to carry out the review by the government in the previous year. The review highlighted the need for coordinated change across the research and innovation community.

In November 2024, he was appointed as a non-executive director at The Department for Science, Innovation and Technology. The main responsibilities of a member are to attend meetings of the departmental board, chaired by the Secretary of State and to provide over-arching strategic and insight to the department.

== Scholarship ==
Tickell is one a number of geographers active since the 1980s studying the spatial and economic expression of capital, finance, and global markets. Others with whom he has coauthored work include Eric Sheppard, Nigel Thrift and Jamie Peck. In particular, he has explored the nature of post-Fordism and regional decentralisation in the UK.

Tickell's most cited work is "Neoliberalizing space", an article with Jamie Peck in Antipode journal, published in 2002 and cited 4,600 times by 2018.

He was editor of Transactions of the Institute of British Geographers in the mid-2000s and is a Fellow of the Academy of Social Sciences.

== Controversy ==
In 2018, Tickell attracted hostility from academics and students who felt his academic critiques of neoliberalism were at odds with the stance he took as a Vice Chancellor during the 2018 USS pension dispute over threats to academic pensions. Posters appeared saying "Critiques neoliberalism in academic articles, but privatises the university for cash".

In December 2020, during his tenure as vice-chancellor, Tickell presided over the largest rent strike in the University's history. Involving more than 750 students, it lasted seven months. It was led by the Sussex Renters’ Union in response to yearly increases in rent and poor mental health support and treatment by the University during the COVID-19 pandemic.

In Autumn 2021, the Sussex branch of the University College Union (UCU) strongly criticised Tickell over a statement sent via email to all students enrolled at the university, regarding academic freedom and Kathleen Stock, related to transphobia on the university campus.

== Publications ==
- Thrift, N, A. Tickell, W.H, Rupp and S. Woolgar (eds). 2014. Globalization in Practice. Oxford University Press.
- Tickell A., E. Sheppard, J. Peck and T. Barnes (eds). 2007. Politics and Practice in Economic Geography. Sage.
