= Jamie Peck =

British geographer

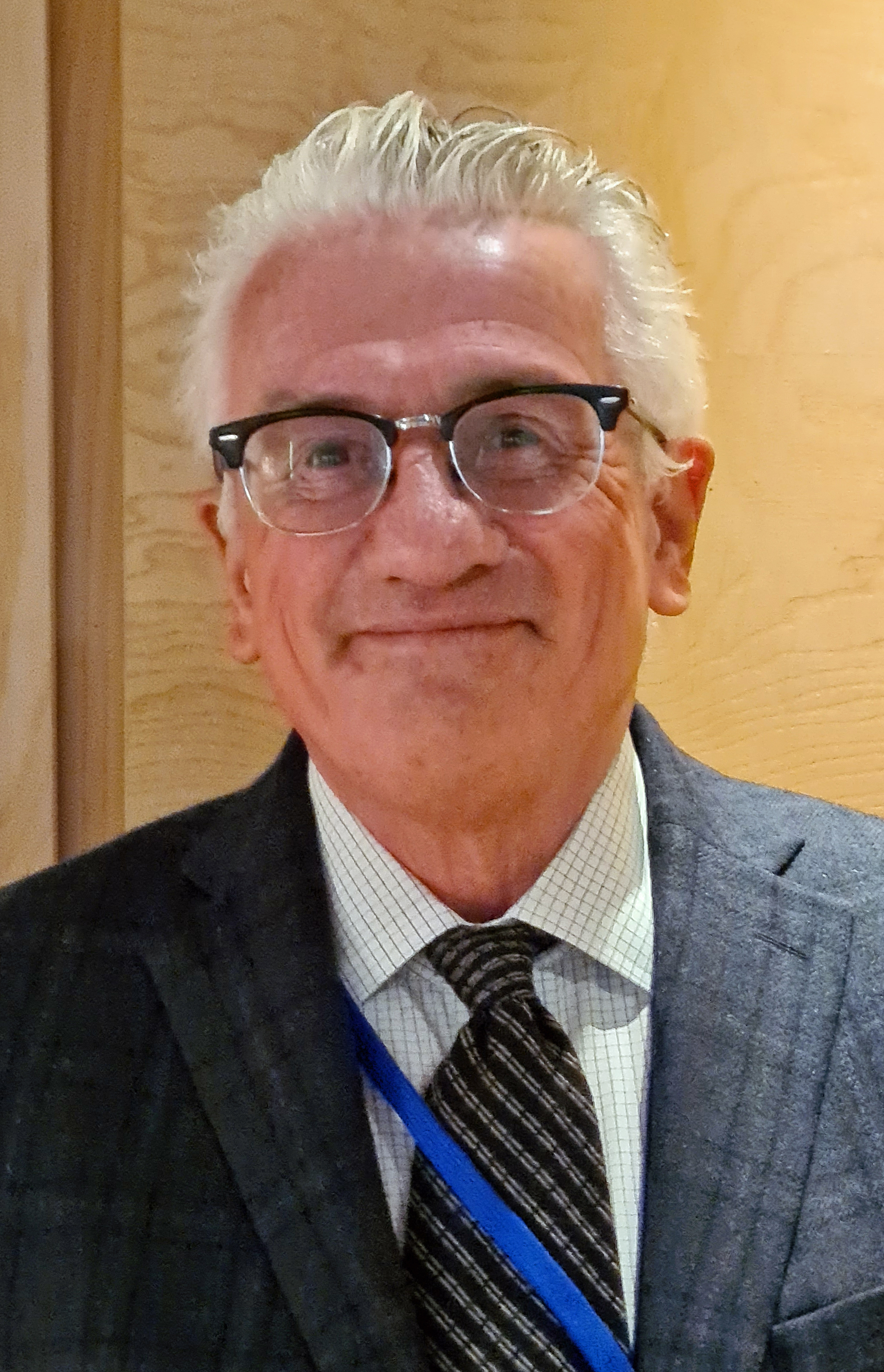
Jamie Peck in Saint-Dié-des-Vosges in 2023

Jamie Peck FRSC FAcSS (born July 9, 1962, in Kimberley, Nottinghamshire, UK) is Canada Research Chair in Urban & Regional Political Economy and professor of geography at the University of British Columbia, Canada. He is the Managing Editor of Environment and Planning A and the convenor of the Summer Institute in Economic Geography.

Peck was awarded the Vautrin Lud Prize, known as the "Nobel Prize for Geography," in 2023.

During the academic year 2026–2027, Jamie Peck is a Residential Fellow at the Swedish Collegium for Advanced Study in Uppsala, Sweden.

== Background ==
The recipient of Guggenheim and Harkness fellowships, he was previously professor of geography and sociology at the University of Wisconsin-Madison and professor of geography at the University of Manchester, and has held visiting positions at Johns Hopkins University, Oxford University, the National University of Singapore, University of the Witwatersrand, the University of Melbourne, the University of Nottingham, the University of Amsterdam, the University of Oslo, and Queen's University Belfast.

== Scholarly contributions ==
Peck's research interests include the political economy of neoliberalization, policy mobility, economic governance, labor market theory and policy, and urban restructuring. His publications include Fast policy: experimental statecraft at the thresholds of neoliberalism (2015, with Nik Theodore), Constructions of neoliberal reason (2010), Contesting neoliberalism: urban frontiers (2007, coedited with Helga Leitner & Eric Sheppard), Politics and practice in economic geography (2007, coedited with Adam Tickell, Eric Sheppard & Trevor Barnes), Workfare states (2001), Work-place: the social regulation of labor markets (1996), and the Wiley-Blackwell companion to economic geography (2012, coedited with Trevor Barnes & Eric Sheppard). His current research is concerned with the sociology of global outsourcing, the politics of labor in the American South, and the political economy of urban restructuring.

== Recognition ==
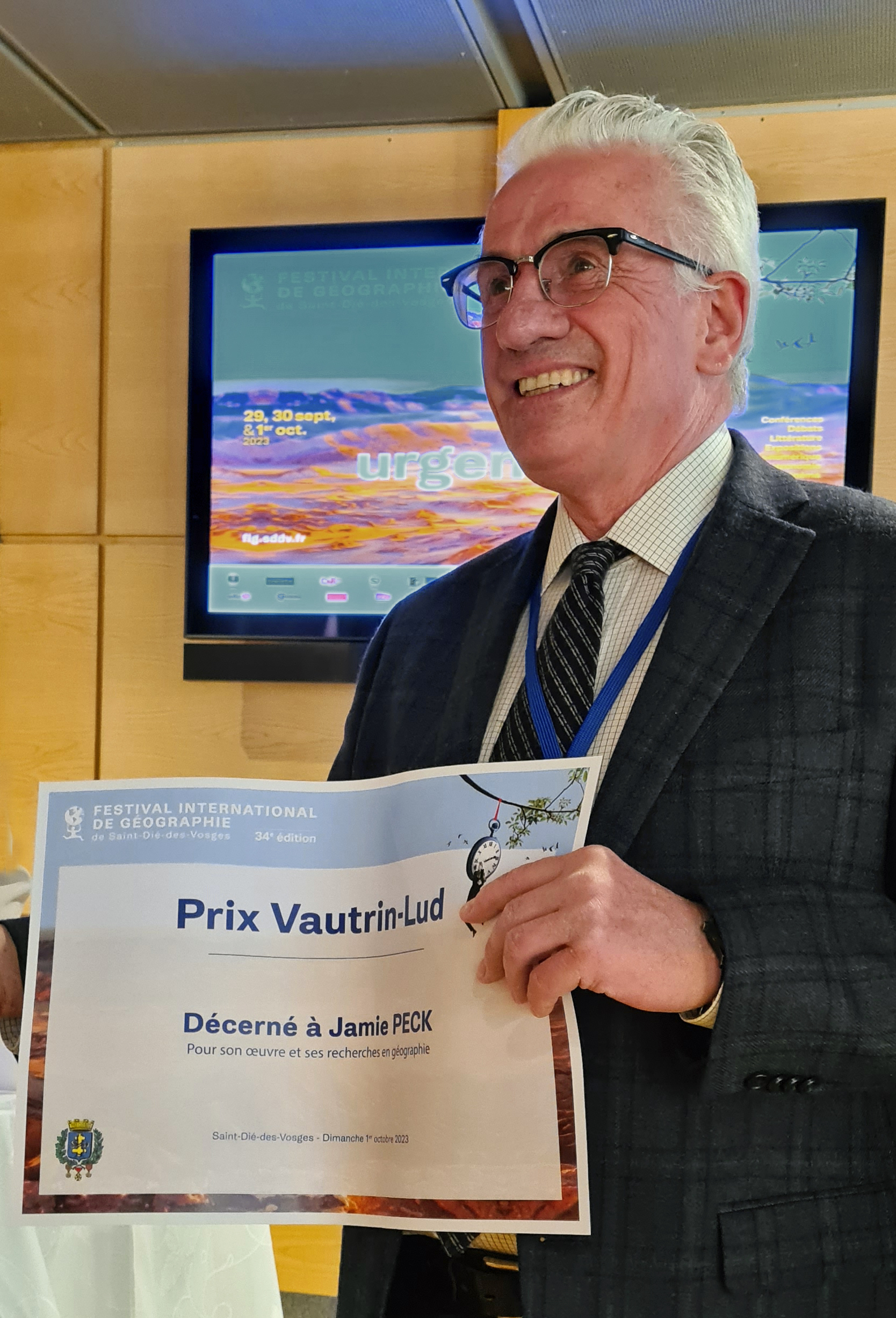
Jamie Peck awarded the Vautrin Lud Prize in 2023

- Vautrin Lud Prize (2023)
- Ellen Churchill Semple award, Department of Geography, University of Kentucky, 2008
- Fellow of the Royal Society of Canada
- Fellow of the Academy of the Social Sciences
- Fellow, John Simon Guggenheim Memorial Foundation (2006–2007)
- Back Award, Royal Geographical Society, for "contributions to new economic geography"
- Harkness Fellow, Commonwealth Fund of New York (1995–1996)
