= Department of Geography, University of Kentucky =

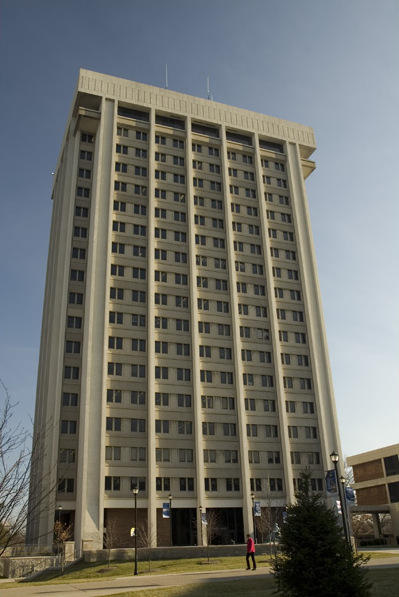
- Established: July 21, 1944
- Chair: Tony Stallins
- Academic staff: 18
- Administrative staff: 2
- Undergraduates: 119
- Postgraduates: 33
- Location: Lexington, Kentucky, U.S. 38.0386°N 84.5042°W
- Website: geography.uky.edu

The Department of Geography in the College of Arts & Sciences at the University of Kentucky offers undergraduate degrees and graduate degrees and courses in physical and human geography. The department has an international reputation for the study of social theory and critical geography, including political ecology. Located in Lexington, Kentucky, the department is consistently ranked among leading geography graduate programs in the United States. The graduate students have organized the annual international conference, Dimensions of Political Ecology or DOPE, since 2010. In the summer of 2012, the department and faculty offices moved to the eighth floor of Patterson Office Tower.

Since 1973, the department has named a scholar the Bluegrass Day Speaker (formerly named for Ellen Churchill Semple). This internationally renowned individual delivers an afternoon address and evening remarks at an awards ceremony. Past Bluegrass Day Speakers have included David Harvey, Anne Buttimer, Peirce F. Lewis, Harm de Blij, Eric Sheppard, Jamie Peck, Lynn Staeheli, Trevor J. Barnes, Sarah Whatmore and Katherine McKittrick.

== History ==
In the 1920s and 1930s, few universities in the American South employed geographers. While there was evidence of interest in geography both in and outside the University of Kentucky, educators deplored the meager offerings and the ineffective teaching of geography in the state's secondary schools. Indeed, there were preparatory courses in geography in the course catalog of the University of Kentucky at the founding of the institution; the earliest course on record being Ancient and Modern Geography in 1865. Educators were pleading for more effective geographic instruction and the business world was demanding a content of more practical value. Among the prominent American geographers, Ellen Churchill Semple, a native of Louisville, Kentucky, informally encouraged Frank L. McVey, President of the University of Kentucky, to establish a geography program, when in 1920 she donated to the university the Cullum Geographical Medal (awarded to her in 1914 by the American Geographical Society). The need for a separate geography program was clearly demonstrated during the next two decades, but it was the decision of the recently appointed president, Herman Lee Donovan, to recommend the establishment of a Geography Department within the College of Arts and Sciences early in the summer of 1944.

UK Geography would begin active work at the opening of the fall semester in September 1944. Since 1923, well before the establishment of the department, courses titled Physiography, Elements of Geography, Economic Geography, Conservation of Natural Resources, Land Problems, Geography of North America, and Geographic Basis of American History had been offered in departments of Geology, Economics, History, and Agriculture. These geography courses were transferred to the new department and additional course offerings in geography were approved for undergraduate and master's degree programs. Joseph R. Schwendeman, who earned a PhD from Clark University in 1941, was appointed head of the new department.

With J. R. Schwendeman as head, and three assistant professors, Harry K. Hutter and Guy N. Parmenter (also from Clark) and Thomas P. Field (from UNC-Chapel Hill) and an associate professor, Richard L. Tuthill (Columbia University), the new department had five full-time faculty and an enrollment of 354 students from 1944 to 1945. In 1952, James Shear (Clark) and Daniel Jacobson (LSU) joined the department to teach climatology and cultural geography. The department, along with anthropology and sociology, established an interdisciplinary general education course for first year students attending the university after World War II entitled Societies Around the World. This two-semester program was taught by members of the three departments for most of the next two decades. Three societies were studied each semester. The first course examined the Eskimo, the Navajo, and Buganda in East Africa; the second analyzed three other areas: China, the Cotton South (in the U.S.), and the British Midlands. Thousands of students were enrolled in these courses to satisfy lower level requirements. It was a bold academic enterprise in multidisciplinary and cross-disciplinary studies led by the geography department. With the support of the Sears Roebuck Foundation, the department also maintained a summer field studies program at this time in Monterrey, Mexico.

In the mid-1960s the department added new faculty to replace those who accepted positions elsewhere. William Withington (Northwestern University) joined to teach economic geography and North America; P. P. Karan (Indiana University) to teach Asia and physical geography; and Forrest McElhoe (Ohio State University) to teach regional and human geography. Faculty members were also involved in various international activities. James Shear spent 1957 to 1959 in Antarctica as part of the International Geophysical Year program; P.P. Karan spent 1957 to 1958 in Nepal as an assistant on the United Nations team that developed the first Five Year Plan for the country, and in 1964 to 1966 as leader of the Geographical Expedition to Bhutan Himalaya project supported by the National Geographic Society.

Between 1950 and 1960 the department averaged about 70 majors each year. There were 21 master's degrees awarded and 2,841 students were enrolled in geography courses from 1966 to 1967. Three of these earned a PhD in geography: Paul Cooper at University of Georgia; Sanford Bederman at University of Minnesota, and Richard Silvernail at University of North Carolina at Chapel Hill. The first MA was granted in 1948 to Wilton Tucker, who taught at a college in Lake Worth, FL. The department's influence was strongest on education throughout Kentucky and in neighboring states. Kentucky MA degree students were employed at Eastern Kentucky University, East Tennessee State University, Marshall University, Morehead State University, Appalachian State University, Minnesota, Southeastern Louisiana, Austin Peay, Western Carolina University, and as high school teachers, climatologists, and city planners in various places throughout the South. In 1967, Schwendeman received the Meritorious Achievement award from the American Association of Geographers, the AAG's highest honor. That summer, he retired after serving as head of department for 23 years.

There have been ten chairs of the department since Schwendeman's term as Head (a designation no longer used at the university),

1. Joseph R. Schwendeman, 1944–1967 (Head)
2. P.P. Karan 1967–1975
3. Karl Raitz, 1975–1980, 1991 (interim), 1996–2008
4. Stan Brunn, 1980–1988
5. Richard Ulack, 1988–1996
6. Susan Roberts 2008–2012
7. Anna Secor, 2012–2013 (interim)
8. Richard Schein, 2013–2017
9. Patricia Ehrkamp, 2017–2022
10. Matthew Zook, 2019–2020 (interim)
11. Matthew Wilson, 2022–2023 (interim), 2023–2026
12. Tony Stallins, 2026-present

The first doctorates were awarded in 1972 to Thomas P. Grimes and Robert Daniel Joseph. The first PhDs awarded to women were Janice Averitt (1975), Helen Parson (1976), who taught at Wilfrid Laurier University, Macel Marteva Wheeler (1977), who taught at Northern Kentucky University, and Wilma Walker (1977) who taught at Eastern Kentucky University.

=== Graduate program ===
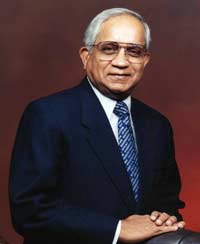
P.P. Karan led the department in the creation of the graduate program in 1968.

Following a national search, Karan was named as chair in 1967. On August 12, 1967, the old Social Sciences Building which housed the department (on the site of the present Fine Arts Library) was gutted by fire, damaging or destroying most of the department's cartographic and meteorological equipment, wall maps, and other teaching aids. The department moved to temporary quarters in Breckinridge Hall for two years (1967 to 1969). In the fall of 1969, the department moved to the fourteenth floor of Patterson Office Tower. A doctoral program was established in 1968 and the faculty size increased from four (Field, Karan, Withington, and McElhoe), to twelve by the mid-1970s.

In 1975 Karl Raitz was named chair. Student enrollment in the program approached 2500 students each semester in the 1970s. Between 1967 and 1980, the department awarded 53 MA and 23 PhD degrees. Graduates of the department were employed at universities in Wisconsin, Minnesota, Kansas, Ohio, Taiwan, Saudi Arabia, Jordan, and Canada in addition to colleges and universities in Kentucky. During the next several years, the department experienced growth in a number of areas, including bringing in new faculty members.

Richard Ulack's appointment as chair of the department in 1988 energized the department's upward trajectory in the college, on campus, and in the discipline. It was during his tenure that the department began to develop one of its current major strengths: a center for critical social theory. The department played a central role in initiating and advancing this program during the late 1980s and early 1990s on campus and in by in the discipline. es. The department's annual research productivity, including books, chapters, and presentations, etc. was instrumental in attracting strong applicants for entrance into the graduate program from the 1980s through the present. Students were active in contributing papers at SEDAAG and AAG meetings, working with faculty on research grants, and publishing articles with faculty or on their own.

The department's commitment to human geography was strengthened through participation in the women's studies program (now the Department of Gender & Women's Studies).

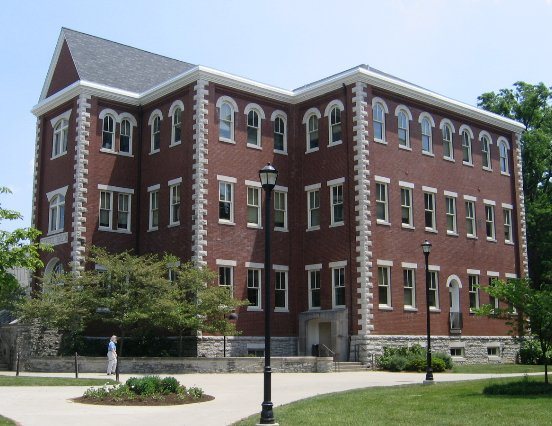
Miller Hall

This concretized interests of the faculty in the GIS & Society debates of the 1990s. Edited by Pickles, Ground Truth was published in 1995 with contributions from Roberts, Schein, Jon Goss (Kentucky), and Pat McHaffie (Kentucky) -- this text quickly catalyzed the development of critical GIS.

=== Early 2020s: COVID-19 and environmental studies ===
The arrival of COVID-19 in Kentucky led to the first video conference meeting for the entire department (with over 30 participants) on 25 March 2020. On May 6, 2020, the department conducted a virtual graduation ceremony/Semple Day (renamed Geography in the Bluegrass Day) to recognize the accomplishments of graduating students. The interdisciplinary major of environmental and sustainability studies moved under the department's administration. This followed a revision of the undergraduate major in the summer of 2020, including the offering of a new minor in urban studies.

== Current research ==
Research in the department is organized in the following research clusters:

- Black Geographies
- Critical Financial Geographies
- Critical Mapping and GIS
- Digital Geographies
- Environmental Geographies
- Political Ecology
- Political Geographies
- Queer and Feminist Geographies
- Social Theory
- Urban Geographies

== Notable people ==
- Carolyn Finney (author), Clark PhD, former faculty member from 2015 to 2018
- John Pickles, former faculty member; now professor at the University of North Carolina at Chapel Hill
- Matthew Zook, current University Research Professor in Economic Geography
