= Karen Seto =

Geographer, urbanization and land change scientist

- Seto after receiving the Vautrid Lud International Geography Prize at the 2026 Festival International de Géographie.
- Born: Hong Kong
- Scientific career
- Born: Karen Ching-Yee Seto
- Education: University of California, Santa Barbara (BA); Boston University (MA, PhD)
- Awards: Vautrin Lud International Geography Prize (2026); Benjamin Franklin Medal in Earth and Environmental Science (2026); Member of the Council on Foreign Relations (2023); Member of the American Academy of Arts and Sciences (2022); Member of the Connecticut Academy of Science and Engineering (2018); Member of the U.S. National Academy of Sciences (2017); Fellow of the American Association for the Advancement of Science (2017); NSF CAREER award (2004)
- Workplaces: Stanford University; Yale University
- Doctoral advisor: Robert K. Kaufmann; Curtis E. Woodcock
- Website: environment.yale.edu/profile/seto

Chinese name
- Traditional Chinese: 司徒靜儀
- Jyutping: Si1tou4 Zing6ji4

Karen Ching-Yee Seto is a geographer, urbanisation and land change scientist, and the Frederick C. Hixon Professor of Geography and Urbanisation Science at Yale University. She is also Director of the Yale Hixon Center for Urban Sustainability and Co-Director of the Yale Center for Geospatial Solutions. She is one of the world's leading experts on urbanisation and global sustainability.

Seto was the co-lead for the chapter on urban mitigation in Intergovernmental Panel on Climate Change (IPCC) 6th Assessment Report and IPCC 5th Assessment Report. From 2014 to 2020, she was the co-editor-in-chief of the scientific journal Global Environmental Change. She is an elected member of the U.S. National Academy of Sciences (NAS), the Connecticut Academy of Science and Engineering (CASE), the American Academy of Arts and Sciences, the Council on Foreign Relations, and a fellow of the American Association for the Advancement of Science (AAAS). She is the first U.S. woman to win the Vautrin Lud International Geography Prize (2026).

== Early life and education ==
Seto was born in Hong Kong and immigrated to the U.S. as a child. She attended Pomona Catholic High School and the University of California, Santa Barbara (UCSB), where she earned her bachelor's degree in political science. She went to Boston University for a joint master's degree in international relations, and resource and environmental management, followed by a doctorate in geography, where she worked with Robert C. Kaufmann and Curtis E. Woodcock. Her dissertation research studied urban land expansion and impacts on agricultural land in the Pearl River Delta of China. She was a pioneer in combining satellite imagery with socioeconomic data using time series econometric methods.

== Career and research ==
Seto was awarded a NASA New Investigator Program in Earth Science Award in 2000 and an National Science Foundation CAREER Award in 2004. She was appointed a faculty member at Stanford University in 2000, where she held joint appointments at the Institute for International Studies and the Woods Institute for the Environment. Seto conducts research on the human transformation of land, understanding the processes of urbanisation and exploring the global-scale environmental effects of urbanization. Her early work considered the relationship between economic development, urbanisation and land use in China and Vietnam. She uses satellite remote sensing and field interviews as a means to document land use and spatial structure. She led the Ecosystem Management Tools for the Commission on Ecosystem Management of the International Union for Conservation of Nature (IUCN) from 2002 to 2008 and co-chaired the International Project on Urbanisation and Global Environmental Change from 2005 to 2016. In 2008, Seto joined the faculty of the Yale School of Forestry and Environmental Studies. In 2013, she was the first woman of color and the first Asian woman to be tenured at the Yale School of Forestry and Environmental Studies (now Yale School of the Environment). Seto was appointed Associate Dean for Research and Director of Doctoral Studies at the Yale School of Forestry & Environmental Studies in 2014 and the Frederick C. Hixon Professor of Geography and Urbanisation Science in 2017.

Seto is a global leader in urbanisation science. Her research has shown that urbanisation is central to many global challenges including climate change, biodiversity loss, and food security. Seto and David Sattherwaite were instrumental in the addition of urban areas as a topic in the IPCC reports, and made the case at the 2009 Scoping Meeting for the IPCC 5th Assessment Report. Seto was on the scientific steering committee of IPCC Working Groups II and III Expert Meeting on Human Settlements and Infrastructure, which subsequently led to standalone urban mitigation and adaptation chapters in the IPCC 5th Assessment Report. She has been a Coordinating Lead Author for two IPCC reports. She co-led the urban mitigation chapter of the 2022 Intergovernmental Panel on Climate Change (IPCC) 6th Assessment Report (AR6) and the 2014 IPCC 5th Assessment Report (AR5), which explored options to mitigate greenhouse gases in urban areas. After an earthquake devastated areas in Nepal in 2015, Seto was inspired to investigate how the evolving urban developments were affecting vulnerability to hazards in the region. She led a NASA project that looks at the links between urban growth, vulnerability and natural disasters. She has studied the "hidden linkages" between urbanisation and food systems. She has used a range of satellite imagery to study urbanisation, including from the Defense Meteorological Satellite Program (DMSP) Operational Linescan System (OLS) nighttime lights imagery, Visible Infrared Imaging Radiometer Suite (VIIRS) and Landsat.

She has held visiting professor positions at National Taipei University and the University of Copenhagen. She was the executive producer of the short documentary film 10,000 Shovels: Rapid Urban Growth in China, which used archival photos and satellite imagery to chronicle urban growth in China.

=== Books and films ===
- City Unseen: New Visions of an Urban Planet
- Handbook on Urbanisation and Global Environmental Change
- 10,000 Shovels: Rapid Urban Growth in China (documentary film)

=== Awards and honours ===
Awards and honours Seto has received include:

- 2009 Aldo Leopold Leadership Fellow
- 2014 Yale School of Forestry & Environmental Studies Faculty Award for Outstanding Teaching and Advising
- 2017 Elected member of the U.S. National Academy of Sciences
- 2017 American Association of Geographers Human Dimensions of Global Change Research Excellence Award
- 2017 Fellow of the American Association for the Advancement of Science
- 2017 Ecological Society of America Sustainability Science Award
- 2018 Elected member of the Connecticut Academy of Science and Engineering
- 2018, 2019, 2020, 2021, 2022, 2023, 2024 Clarivate Analytics Highly Cited Researchers List
- 2019 American Association of Geographers Outstanding Contributions to Remote Sensing Research award
- 2022 Elected member of the American Academy of Arts and Sciences
- 2022 American Geographical Society, Alexander and Ilse Melamid Medal
- 2023 Lifetime member of the Council on Foreign Relations
- 2025 Boston University Distinguished Alumni Award
- 2026 Benjamin Franklin Medal in Earth and Environmental Science
- 2026 Vautrin Lud International Geography Prize
