= David Seamon =

American geographer, phenomenologist and academic

ZProf. David Seamon
- Born: April 14, 1948 (age 78)
- Occupations: Phenomenologist; geographer; academic; researcher; editor; author
- Years active: 1972–present
- Title: Professor Emeritus of Environment-Behavior & Place Studies

Academic background
- Education: Clark University (BA (1970), PhD (1977))
- Thesis: Movement, Rest, and Encounter: A Phenomenology of Everyday Environmental Experience (1977)

Academic work
- Sub-discipline: architectural and environmental phenomenology
- Institutions: Kansas State University
- Main interests: Phenomenologies of place and placemaking
- Notable works: A Geography of the Lifeworld (1979); Life Takes Place: Phenomenology, Lifeworlds and Place Making (2018)

David Seamon (born 14 April 1948) is an American geographer, phenomenologist, author and academic. Seamon in known for his work on the theory of architectural phenomenology, environmental phenomenology, and environmental design as placemaking. He is the editor of the Environmental and Architectural Phenomenology journal, published since 1990. Seamon is the author of several books in behavioral geography and place phenomenology including Life Takes Place: Phenomenology, Lifeworlds and Place Making (2018, Routledge) and A Geography of the Lifeworld: Movement, Rest and Encounter. (Note: St. Martin's Press 1979 1st edition, Routledge 2015 reprint) Seamon has been Professor of Environment-Behavior and Place Studies at Kansas State University since 1993.

== Biography ==
Seamon was born on 14 April 1948. He graduated with a Bachelor of Arts from the State University of New York at Albany in 1970 and from Clark University with a PhD in geography in 1977. As a post-doctoral research fellow, he attended the University of Lund in Sweden from 1978 to 1980, working with humanistic geographer Anne Buttimer. Seamon was Visiting assistant professor at the University of Oklahoma from 1980 to 1983. He joined the Department of Architecture at Kansas State University in 1983 first as a Tenure-track assistant professor, and then as an associate professor from 1987 to 1993 when he was promoted to full Professor.

== Bibliography ==
=== Select books ===
- Seamon, David. Phenomenological perspectives on place, lifeworlds, and lived emplacement. Routledge, 2023.
- Seamon, David. Life takes place: Phenomenology, lifeworlds, and place making. Routledge, 2018.
- Seamon, David. A Geography of the Lifeworld: Movement, Rest and Encounter (Routledge Revivals). Routledge, 2015. (Note: Originally published in 1979.)
- Buttimer, Anne, and David Seamon, eds. The human experience of space and place (Routledge Revivals). Routledge, 2015. (Note: Originally published in 1980.)
- Seamon, David, and Arthur Zajonc, eds. Goethe's way of science: A phenomenology of nature. State University of New York Press, 1998.
- Seamon, David, and Robert Mugerauer, eds. Dwelling, place and environment: Towards a phenomenology of person and world. Dordrecht, the Netherlands: Springer, 1985.

=== Select journal articles ===
- Seamon, David. Ways of Understanding Wholeness: Place, Christopher Alexander, and Synergistic Relationality, World Futures: Journal of New Paradigm Research, 80, 2 (2024). doi:10.1080/02604027.2024.2330288
- Seamon, David. Serendipitous Events in Place: The Weave of Bodies and Context via Environmental Unexpectedness and Chance, Intertwining: Weaving Body Context, No. 3 (2021): 120–133. Milan: Mimesis International.
- Seamon, David. Christopher Alexander’s Theory of Wholeness as a Tetrad of Creative Activity: The Examples of A New Theory of Urban Design and The Nature of Order, Urban Science 3, (2019): 1–13. doi:10.3390/urbansci3020046
- Seamon, David. Understanding Place Holistically: Cities, Synergistic Relationality, and Space Syntax, Journal of Space Syntax, 6 (2015), pp. 32–43.
- Seamon, David. Situated Cognition and the Phenomenology of Place: Lifeworld, Environmental Embodiment, and Immersion-in-World, Cognitive Processes,16, 1 (2015): 389–92. doi:10.1007/s10339-015-0678-9
- Seamon, David. Looking at a Photograph—André Kertész's 1928 Meudon: Interpreting Aesthetic Experience Phenomenologically, Academic Quarter [Akademisk Kvarter], 9 (2015): 322–35.
- Seamon, David. Lived Bodies, Place, and Phenomenology: Implications for Human Rights and Environmental Justice, Journal of Human Rights and the Environment, 4, 2 (2013): 143–66
- Seamon, David. “A Jumping, Joyous Urban Jumble”: Jane Jacobs’s Death and Life of Great American Cities as a Phenomenology of Urban Place, Journal of Space Syntax, 3 (2013): 139–49.
- Seamon, David. Place, Placelessness, Insideness, and Outsideness in John Sayles’ Sunshine State. In Aether: A Journal of Media Geography, 3 (2008): 1–19.
- Seamon, David. Goethe’s Way of Science as a Phenomenology of Nature, Janus Head, 8 (2005): 86–101.
- Seamon, David. Emotional Experience of the Environment, American Behavioral Scientist, 27 (1984): 757 770.
- Seamon, David. The phenomenological contribution to environmental psychology. Journal of environmental psychology 2 (1982): 119–140.

=== Book chapters ===
- Seamon, David. Phenomenological Research Methods and Urban Design, in Hesam Kamalipour, Patricia Aelbrecht, and Nastaran Peimani (eds.), Routledge Handbook of Urban Design Research Methods, pp. 224–231. London: Routledge, 2024.
- Seamon, David. Architecture and Phenomenology, in Duanfang Lu (ed.), Routledge Companion to Contemporary Architectural History, pp. 218–229. London: Routledge, 2024.
- Seamon, David and Thomas Larsen. Humanistic Geography, in Douglas Richardson (ed.), International Encyclopedia of Geography: People, the Earth, Environment, and Technology. NY: Wiley, 2021.
- Seamon, David. Place Attachment and Phenomenology: The Dynamic Complexity of Place, in Lynne Manzo and Patrick Devine-Wright (eds.), Place Attachment: Advances in Theory, Methods and Research, 2nd edition, pp. 29–44. London: Routledge, 2021.
- Seamon, David. Atmosphere, Place, and Phenomenology: Depictions of London Place Settings in Three Writings by British-African Novelist Doris Lessing, in T. Griffero and M. Tedeschini (eds.), Atmosphere and Aesthetics, pp. 133–146. London: Palgrave Macmillan, 2019.
- Seamon, David. Merleau-Ponty, Lived Body and Place: Toward a Phenomenology of Human Situatedness, a chapter in T. Hünefeldt and A. Schlitte (eds.), Situatedness and Place, pp. 41–66. Cham, Switzerland: Springer, 2019.
- Seamon, David. A Phenomenological and Hermeneutic Reading of Rem Koolhaas's Seattle Central Library, in Ruth Conway Dalton and Christopher Hölscher (eds.), Take One Building: Interdisciplinary Research Perspectives on the Seattle Central Library, pp. 67–94. London: Routledge, 2017.
- Seamon, David. Architecture, Place, and Phenomenology: Buildings as Lifeworlds, Atmospheres, and Environmental Wholes, a chapter in Janet Donohoe (ed.), Phenomenology and Place, pp. 247–263. Lanham, MD: Rowman and Littlefield, 2017.
- Seamon, David. Hermeneutics and Architecture: Buildings-in-Themselves and Interpretive Trustworthiness, in Bruce Janz (ed.), Hermeneutics, Space, and Place, pp. 347–360. NY: Springer, 2017
- Seamon, David and Harneet Gill. Qualitative Approaches to Environment-Behavior Research: Understanding Environmental and Place Experiences, Meanings, and Actions, in Robert Gifford (ed.), Research Methods for Environmental Psychology, pp. 115–135. NY: Wiley/Blackwell, 2016.
- Seamon, David. Lived Emplacement and the Locality of Being: A Return to Humanistic Geography? In Stuart Aitken and Gill Valentine (eds.), Approaches to Human Geography, 2nd edn., pp. 35–48. London: Sage, 2015.
- Seamon, David. Physical and Virtual Environments: Meaning of Place and Space, in B. Schell and M. Scaffa (eds.). Willard & Spackman's Occupational Therapy, 12th Edition, B. Schell & M. Scaffa, pp. 202–14. Philadelphia: Lippincott, Williams & Wilkens, 2014
- Seamon, David. Phenomenology and Uncanny Homecoming: Homeworld, Alienworld, and Being-at-Home in Alan Ball's HBO Television Series, Six Feet Under, in Daniel Boscaljon Resisting the Place of Belonging, pp. 155–70. Burlington, Vermont: Ashgate, 2013

== Memberships ==
- The Society for Phenomenology and the Human Sciences (SPHS)
- The International Association for Environmental Philosophy (IAEP)
- The Society for Phenomenology and Existential Philosophy (SPEP)
- The Environmental Design Research Association (EDRA)
