= Terence McGee =

Terence McGee may refer to:

- Terence Gary McGee or Terry McGee (born 1936), geographer
- Terrence McGee (born 1980), American football cornerback and return specialist
- Terrence Magee (born 1993), American football running back
