= Jean-Christophe Gay =

French geographer and university professor (born 1962)

Academic work
- Discipline: Geography

Jean-Christophe Gay, born in 1962, is a French geographer and full professor at the Côte d'Azur University. Initially a specialist in spatial discontinuities, he has oriented his research towards the practices and places of tourism as well as towards territories).

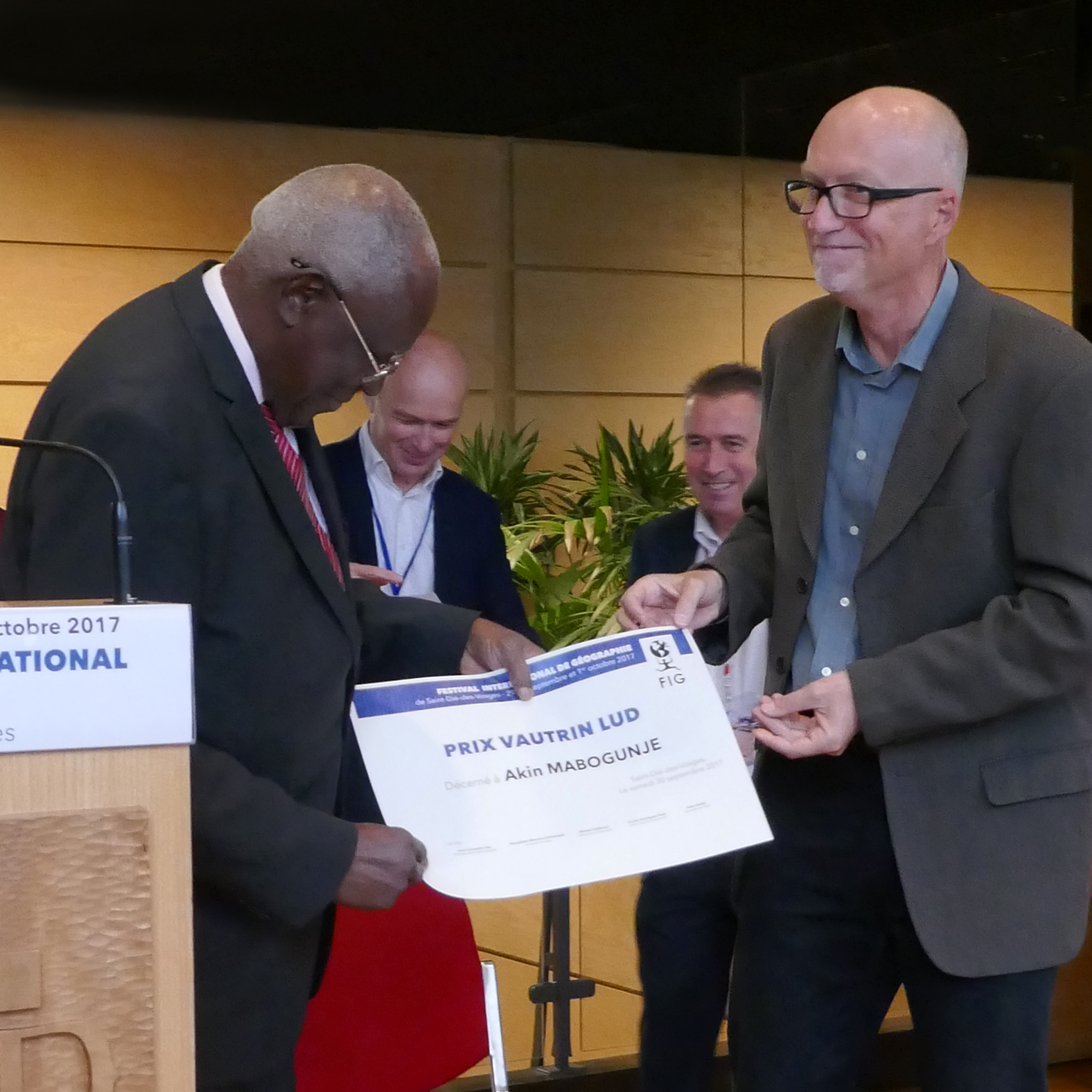
Jean-Christophe Gay awarding the prix Vautrin Lud to Akin Mabogunje in 2017.

Many of his works are devoted to the tropical island world, particularly overseas France where he lived for more than ten years, first as a research fellow to ORSTOM (now IRD) from 1987 to 1989 in Tahiti, within the scientific and technical team of the Atlas of French Polynesia (1993), then as a senior lecturer at the University of Reunion Island from 1995 to 2000, and finally as a research director in New Caledonia, within the IRD from 2009 to 2012. He coordinated the Atlas of New Caledonia, of which he is the scientific co-director as well as the main author, and for which he received the scientific book prize in 2013 at the 15th Salon du livre insulaire d'Ouessant.

From 1995 to 2011, he was part of the MIT research team (Mobilities, itineraries, territories) attached to the Paris Diderot University (Paris 7) and participated in the writing of the series Tourismes in three parts, published from 2002 to 2011 by Belin.

He was the general secretary of the prix Vautrin Lud awarded as part of the International Festival of Geography (FIG) and chaired, from 2015 to 2020, the committee evaluating the GIP "CNRT Nickel and its environment" in New Caledonia.

Since 2021, he has been the scientific director of the Institut du tourisme Côte d'Azur (ITCA) and a member of the scientific committee of the Overseas Chair at Sciences Po Paris.

== Bibliography ==
A complete bibliography is available online

=== Books ===
- Les discontinuités spatiales, coll. « Géopoche », Économica, Paris, 1995 (rééd. 2004)
- (Co-author) Tourismes 1. Lieux communs, Belin, Paris, 2002
- L’Outre-mer français en mouvement, Paris, La Documentation française, coll. « La Documentation photographique » n° 8031, 2003.
- L’Outre-mer français. Un espace singulier, coll. « SupGéo », Belin, 2003 (rééd. 2008)
- (Co-author) Tourismes 2. Moments de lieux, Belin, 2005
- Les cocotiers de la France. Tourismes en outre-mer, coll. « SupTourisme », Paris, Belin, 2009
- (Co-author) Tourismes 3. La révolution durable, Belin, 2011
- (Codirection) Atlas de la Nouvelle-Calédonie, Marseille-Nouméa, IRD-Congrès de la Nouvelle-Calédonie, (J. Bonvallot, J.-C. Gay et E. Habert), 2012
- La Nouvelle-Calédonie, un destin peu commun, Marseille, IRD éditions, 2014.
- Le DVD des communes de la Nouvelle-Calédonie, Marseille, IRD éditions, 2014 (in association with C. Chauvin).
- L'Homme et les limites, Paris, Economica-Anthropos, 2016.
- Un Coin de paradis. Vacances et tourisme en Nouvelle-Calédonie, Musée de la ville de Nouméa, 2017
- Tourisme et transport. Deux siècles d’interaction, Levallois-Perret, Bréal (in association with Véronique Mondou), 2017
- Les Outre-mers européens, Paris, La Documentation française, coll. «La Documentation photographique» n° 8123, 2018
- La France d’outre-mer. Terres éparses, sociétés vivantes, Paris, Armand Colin, 2021, 285 p. ISBN 978-2-200-629-18-2 (interview)
- Le tourisme en France, 1 & 2, Londres, ISTE (in association with Philippe Violier, Philippe Duhamel, Véronique Mondou), 2021, 288 p. et 232 p.
