= Life Takes Place =

2018 book by David Seamon

- Cover
- Author: David Seamon
- Language: English
- Subject: Phenomenology, geography, place studies
- Genre: Non-fiction
- Publisher: Routledge
- Publication date: April 24, 2018
- Publication place: United States
- Pages: 230
- ISBN: 9780815380719

Life Takes Place: Phenomenology, Lifeworlds, and Place Making is a book by American geographer and phenomenologist David Seamon. It was published in 2018 by Routledge. The book explores the significance of place in human existence within the context of our modern, mobile society. Through a phenomenological lens, Seamon delves into the multifaceted nature of places, emphasizing their role in gathering, activating, and interconnecting various elements of human experience. Drawing on practical examples from fields such as architecture and urban design, Seamon advocates for a holistic understanding of place that informs rigorous place-making practices, ultimately contributing to the enrichment of environmental experiences.

== Summary ==
The book explores of the relationship between life and place from a phenomenological perspective. Through a detailed analysis, Seamon introduces the concept of 'synergistic relationality' as a holistic approach to understanding the dynamic nature of place. The book outlines an interpretive methodology, drawing from Systems Theory, to examine the interconnectedness of experiences, actions, and meanings within various environments. It aims to develop a comprehensive phenomenology of place while addressing critical concerns and historical perspectives. Seamon emphasizes the embodied nature of human activities within their surroundings and advocates for a deeper understanding of place beyond rationalist approaches. Through the lens of progressive approximation, the book navigates through the complexities of place, revealing hidden structures and interconnected relationships.

=== The six places processes ===
A major phenomenological question asked by Seamon in the book is how places change for better or worse. Are there underlying lived processes impelling ways that places are what they are and what they become? To answer this question, he identified six processes that can work in constructive or undermining ways. He defined these six processes as follows:

1. Place interaction: The typical goings-on in a place and the constellation of actions, situations, and events unfolding in that place. One speaks of the “rounds of a place, “the seasons of a place,” or “a day in the life of the place.” Some place interactions are routine and taken for granted, while others are occasional or once-in-a-lifetime.
2. Place identity: People associated with place take up that place as a significant part of their world. Place becomes integral to a personal and communal sense of self and self-worth. If people live their entire lives in one place, place identity is an integral aspect of who people are. Today, many people regularly change places, and strong place identity is less certain, since it requires time and continual, active involvement with place.
3. Place release: Happenstance encounters and events arising because of serendipitous moments in place. Through surprising, unexpected engagements and situations in place, people are “released” more deeply into themselves. Partly because of serendipitous experiences offered by place, “life is good.”
4. Place realization: The distinctive environmental presence fostered by both tangible and intangible qualities of place, including ambience and atmosphere. The place evokes a unique feeling and character that is as real in itself as the people who know and experience that place. The less effable aspects of place realization relate to “sense of place” or spirit of place.”
5. Place intensification: The independent power of the physical and spatial environment to contribute actively to human wellbeing and place quality. The independent power of the material, designable aspects of place to make a difference in the actions, experiences, and meanings of a place. The recognition that environmental and spatial features of place can strengthen or weaken the quality of life-in-place.
6. Place creation: People responsible for a place draw on their commitment to that place to envision and fabricate creative changes that make the place better. Individuals and groups associated with a place empathize with that place and generate designs, plans, policies, and actions that respect the place and make it more actualized, robust, and whole.

== Critical reception ==
Michael J. Broadway praised the book and commended its intellectually stimulating exploration of the essence of geography and place. He particularly valued the author's phenomenological approach and sequential organization, which effectively build upon each chapter's content. Broadway appreciated the book's holistic perspective on place, emphasizing its relevance to human existence and well-being.

Andrew Turk wrote:

David Seamon’s latest book Life Takes Place: Phenomenology, Lifeworlds, and Place Making (2018) is very readable for those from disciplines other than the obvious ones of architecture, urban planning, geography and philosophy. The content and structure of this book provides both an introduction to the topic and a summary of key issues.

Thomas Barclay Larsen praised Seamon's adept synthesis of phenomenology and humanistic geography, highlighting the value of understanding place through lived experience. He commended the book for its significant contributions to the humanistic tradition in geography, suggesting it as essential reading for students and researchers interested in exploring the dynamic relationships between people and place. Larsen wrote:

Life Takes Place aims to further emplace our thinking about the human condition, to elucidate 'the significance of places in human life and how they might be envisioned and made to strengthen human well-being.'

== See also ==
- Phenomenology (philosophy)
- Maurice Merleau-Ponty
- Anne Buttimer
- Edward S. Casey
- Jeff Malpas
- Edward Relph
- Yi-Fu Tuan
