= Peirce F. Lewis =

American geographer and professor (1927–2018)

Peirce Fee Lewis (October 26, 1927 – February 18, 2018) was an American geographer and professor at Pennsylvania State University who has extensively written on the subjects of the American landscape and the cultural geography of America. He served as president of the Association of American Geographers in 1983–1984.

== Recognitions ==
- Ellen Churchill Semple award, Department of Geography, University of Kentucky, 1981
- Guggenheim Fellowship, 1986
