= Harm de Blij =

American geographer (1935–2014)

Harm Jan de Blij (Dutch: [ɦɑrm jɑn də blɛi̯]; October 9, 1935 – March 25, 2014) was a Dutch-American geographer. He was a geography editor on ABC's Good Morning America and an editor of National Geographic magazine and the author of several books, including Why Geography Matters.

== Education and career ==
De Blij was born in Schiedam, the Netherlands, and received his early schooling in Europe. He received his B.Sc. from the University of the Witwatersrand in South Africa in 1955, and his M.A. in 1957 and Ph.D. in 1959 in the United States from Northwestern University. He published more than 30 books and over 100 articles and has received five honorary degrees. Several of his books have been translated into foreign languages. He was the editor of Oxford's Atlas of North America. A native of the Netherlands, he was a professor of geography and viticulture at Michigan State University and the University of Miami and a visiting professor at the Colorado School of Mines.

Dr. de Blij was a Distinguished Professor of Geography at Michigan State University. He held the George Landegger Chair in Georgetown University's school of Foreign Service and the John Deaver Drinko chair of geography at Marshall University; he also taught at the Colorado School of Mines and the University of Miami.

== Recognitions ==
- Ellen Churchill Semple award, Department of Geography, University of Kentucky, 1989

== Bibliography ==
- Mombasa: An African City, Northwestern University Press, 1968.
- Systematic Political Geography, John Wiley & Sons, 1973
- Essentials of Geography: Regions and Concepts, John Wiley & Sons, 1974.
- Geography of Viticulture, Miami Geographical Society, 1981.
- Harm De Blij's Geography Book: A Leading Geographer's Fresh Look at Our Changing World, John Wiley & Sons, 1995.
- Why Geography Matters: Three Challenges Facing America, Oxford Univ. Press, 2005.
- Wartime Encounter, Hudson River Enterprises, 2006.
- Human Geography: People, Place, and Culture, John Wiley and Sons, Inc.
- Realms, Regions and Concepts: With College Atlas of the World, John Wiley & Sons, Inc., 2007.
- The Power of Place: Geography, Destiny, and Globalization's Rough Landscape, Oxford Univ. Press, 2008.
- Why Geography Matters: More than Ever, Oxford Univ. Press, 2012.
