= Brenda Yeoh =

Singaporean academic and geographer

Brenda Yeoh Saw Ai
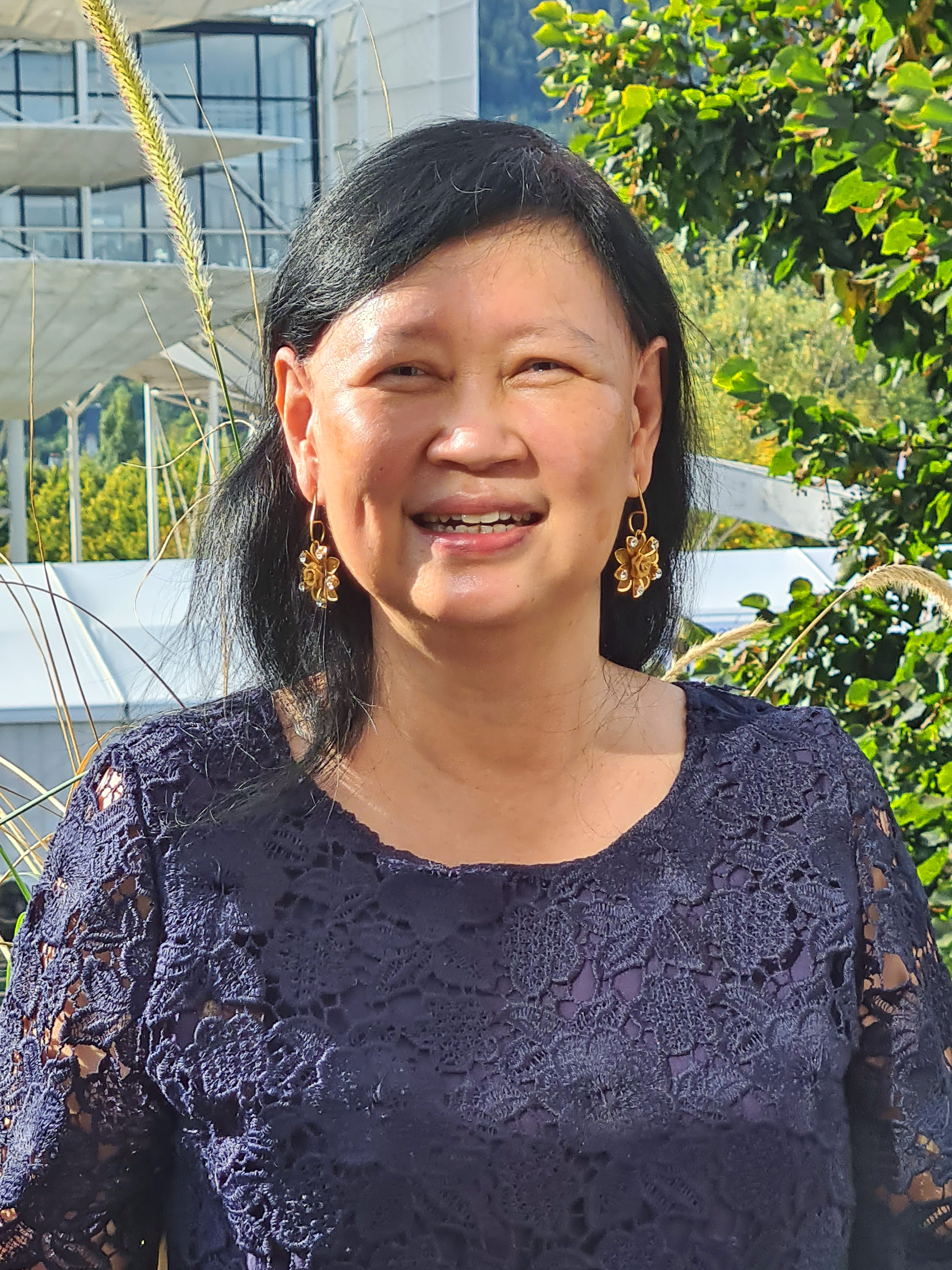
- Yeoh in 2021
- Education: University of Cambridge; University of Oxford
- Occupations: Geographer, academic
- Known for: Vautrin Lud Prize

Brenda Yeoh Saw Ai FBA (Chinese: 杨淑爱) is a Singaporean academic and geographer. She is currently a Distinguished Professor at the National University of Singapore.

== Biography ==
In 1985, Yeoh received a Bachelor of Arts in geography from the University of Cambridge, earning a first class honours degree. She went on to read a Diploma in Education from the Institute of Education before completing a stint as a teacher at Victoria Junior College. After leaving the teaching service, she read a DPhil in geography from the University of Oxford, and joined the National University of Singapore as an academic. She joined NUS as a senior tutor in 1987, was made full professor in 2005, and served as the Dean of the Faculty of Arts and Social Sciences from 2010–2016.

In 2000, she received a Fulbright Program scholarship to study at the University of California, Berkeley.

Yeoh is editor of the journal Asian Population Studies and a member of the International Geographical Union’s Population Geography Commission.

== Vautrin Lud Prize ==
In 2021, Yeoh received the Vautrin Lud Prize "for her contributions to migration and transnationalism studies". The award is one of the highest honours presented for developments in geography, and widely considered the 'Nobel Prize in Geography'. In the same year she was elected a corresponding fellow of the British Academy.
