= Matthew Zook =

American geographer

Matthew Zook is an American geographer and professor in the Department of Geography, University of Kentucky. He studies the geography of the Internet, the GeoWeb, economic geography and domain names In 2009 Matthew Zook and Mark Graham cofounded the FloatingSheep blog to understand the interactions between the GeoWeb and the offline world. In 2011 Zook cofounded the New Mappings Collaboratory at the University of Kentucky to focus on public engagement in Lexington, 'big data' and user-generated Internet content, as well as the affordances of place-based thinking, analysis, and representation.

== Early and personal life ==
Matthew Zook was born to mother Bonnie Zook and father Gordon Zook.

== Education ==
- Ph.D., University of California, Berkeley - Dept. of City and Regional Planning. 2000
- M.R.P., Cornell University (Ithaca, New York) 1995.
- B.A., Earlham College (Richmond, Indiana) 1989

== Research ==
Much of Zook's early work is on how economic factors have influenced and shaped the internet and the ICT industry (Information, Communications and Technology). He discusses how the infrastructure of the ICT industry was constructed upon an existing network of Venture Capital [grounded capital]. This research showed how despite the image of the internet being a tool of egalitarian communication and commerce, the resources of production were creating a digital divide.

His work as an economic geographer contributed to a greater understanding of the expansion and impact of Walmart in USA. Zook also created a heat map generated from the data being collected from the Price of Weed project, which was featured in Wired.

His more recent research looks at the GeoWeb. Although the transition was gradual, what seems to have started with mapping content creation has turned into a fascination with mapping not only user generated content, but specifically geo-coded data.

== Awards ==
- University of Kentucky Provost's Outstanding Teaching Award (2013)
- Maps made by Matthew Zook

In 2006, Zook provided expert testimony about the Geography of Internet Pornography in a federal court case American Civil Liberties Union vs. Alberto Gonzales

- In 2007 and 2013 Matthew Zook won a Fulbright Fellowship to study in Estonia.
- In 2015, Zook was named the Kentucky State Geographer by Governor Steve Beshear.

== Publications ==
Notable Work
Title	Journal/Publisher	Year	Cites
The Web of Production: The Economic Geography of Commercial Internet Content Production	Environment and planning A/PION LTD	2000	174
Old Hierarchies or New Networks of Centrality?	American Behavioral Scientist/SAGE	2001	127
Grounded Capital: Venture Financing and the Geography of the Internet Industry	Journal of Economic Geography/Oxford University Press	2002	124
The Geography of the Internet Industry: Venture Capital, dot-coms, and Local Knowledge	Wiley-Blackwell	2005	145
The Creative Reconstruction of the Internet: Google and the privatization of cyberspace and DigiPlace.	Geoforum	2007	93
Volunteered Geographic Information and Crowdsourcing Disaster Relief: A Case Study of the Haitian Earthquake.	World Health and Medical Policy	2010	89
