= Maria Dolors García Ramón =

Spanish geographer (born 1943)

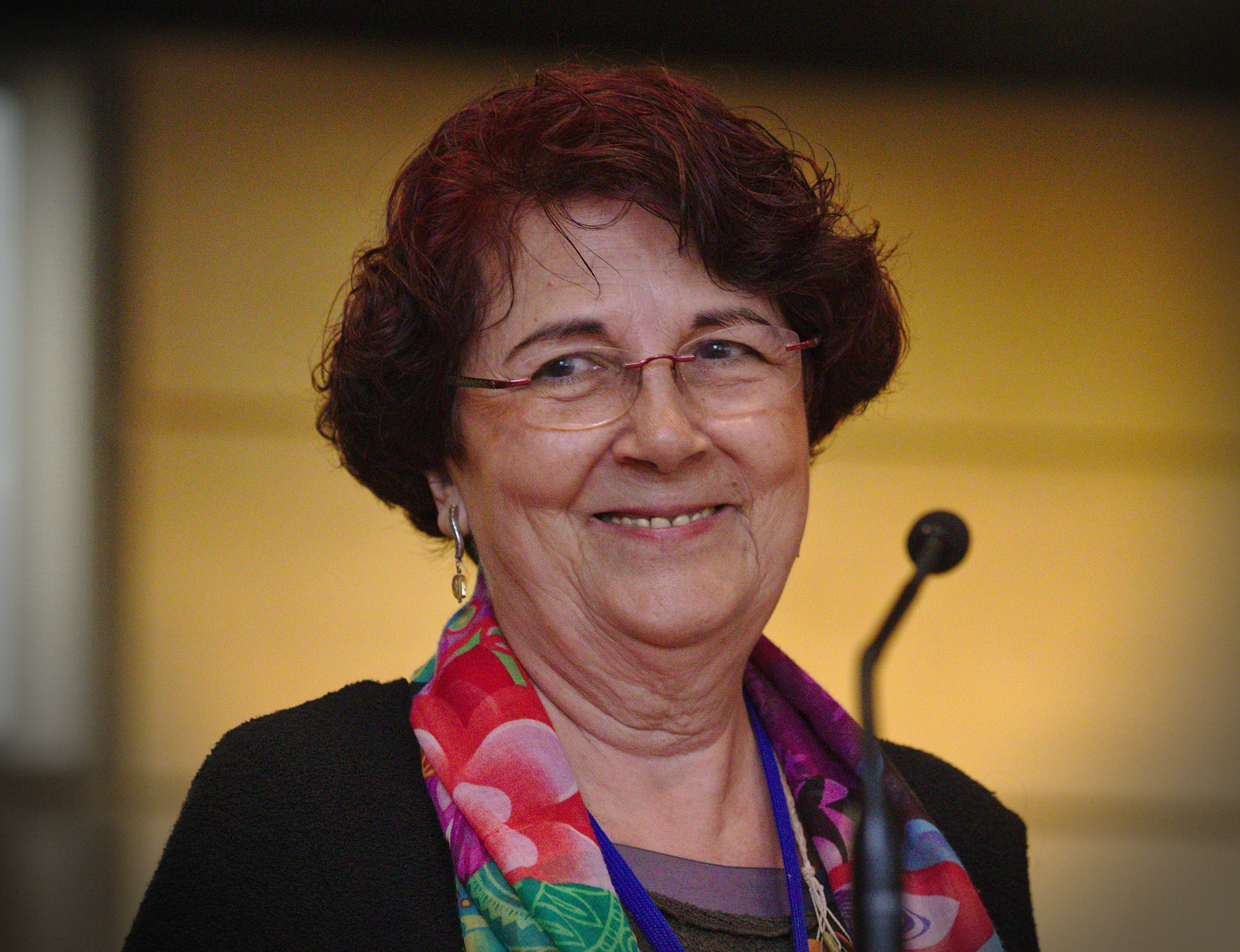
García Ramón in 2016

Maria Dolors García Ramón (born 1943) is a Spanish geographer. She is emeritus professor of geography of the Autonomous University of Barcelona.

== Early life and education ==
García Ramón was born on 7 November 1943 in Gandia, Valencia. She has a BA and PhD from the University of Barcelona and an MA from the University of California.

== Career ==
García Ramón was professor of geography at the Autonomous University of Barcelona from 1969 to 2010, and also held appointments as professor or research fellow at the University of Arizona, Cornell University, University of Buenos Aires, Durham University and the London School of Economics.

She lists her research specialisms as Rural Geography, Geographical Thought, and Geography and Gender.

From 1988 to 1996 she was Secretary of the International Geographical Union's Study Group on Gender and Geography.

She was awarded the 2016 Vautrin Lud Prize (Le Prix Vautrin-Lud), which has been described as "the highest award that can be bestowed on a geographer" and "the Nobel of geography".
