= Price of Weed =

User-generated price database for cannabis

- Website type: User generated database
- Website: http://www.priceofweed.com/
- Commercial: No
- Registration: None
- Launched: 2010
- Current status: Online

Price of Weed (or priceofweed.com) is a user-generated database of marijuana prices. Users may submit prices and quantities for transactions, and their location is geolocated in order to generate a price index for states and cities. While user-generated prices have no inherent check on accuracy, the criminal status of marijuana in many countries means a formal price index may be difficult to construct.

In August 2011, Matthew Zook, a professor of geography at the University of Kentucky, generated a detailed heatmap using data from the site. The map was included in an issue of Wired and drew attention to Price of Weed from Barry Ritholtz's Big Picture and Flowing Data. In 2014, Allen B. Downey, a professor from Olin College, utilized data from Price of Weed in his book Think Stats: Probability and Statistics for Programmers (Second Edition). In May 2015, Frank Bi of Forbes published a piece title All 50 States Ranked By The Cost Of Weed. In June 2015, The Washington Post generated a detailed infographic portraying pricing data from eight major US cities. This marks the first data shared publicly portraying a time series of data by city from Price of Weed. In August 2015, Mingshu Wang from The Department of Geography at University of Georgia generated a detailed graphic portraying the crowdsourced data from The Price of Weed. In October 2016, David Floyd of Investopedia published an infographic in a post titled What Does Weed Cost in Your State?
