= Trevor J. Barnes =

British academic (born 1956)

Trevor John Barnes
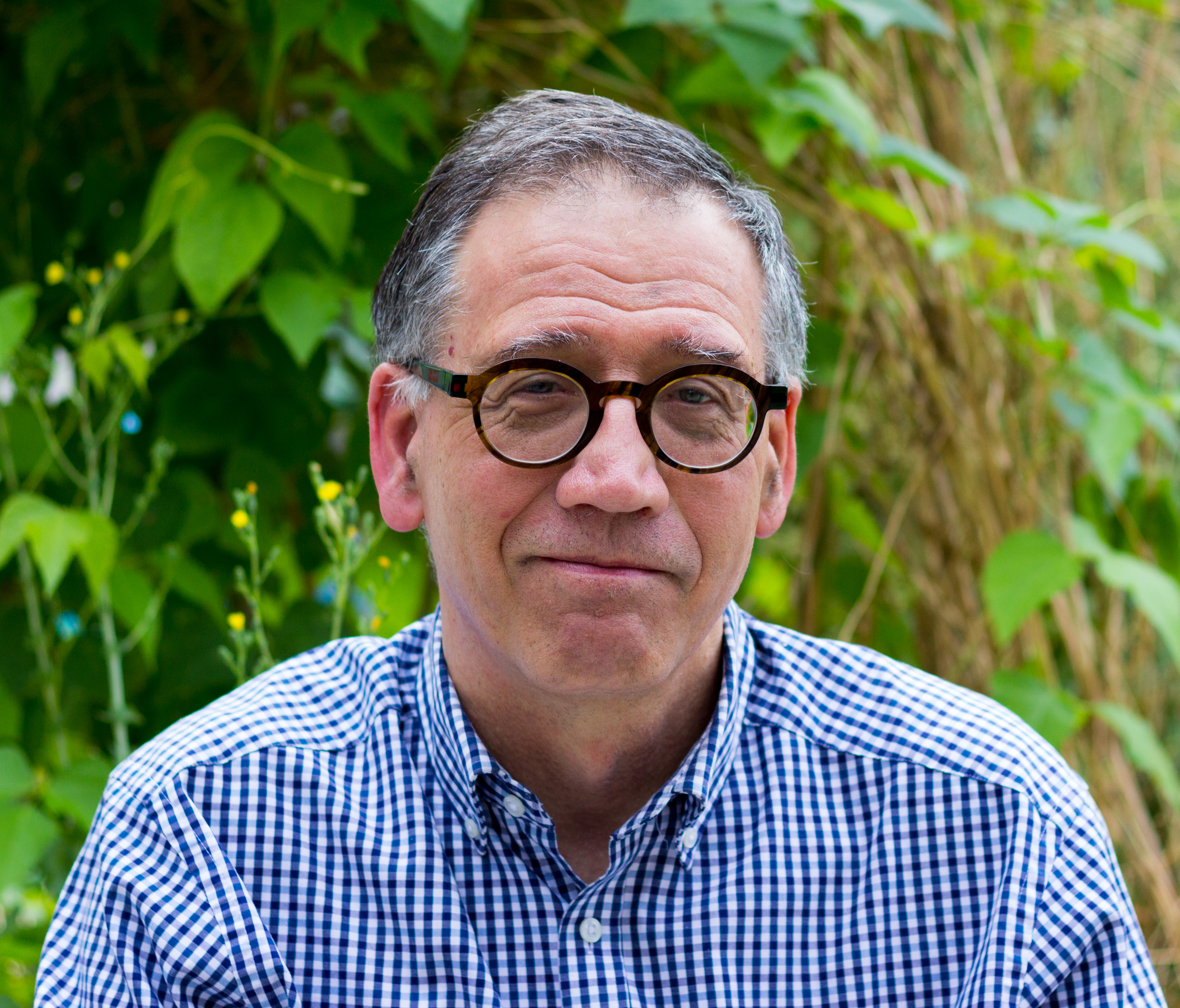
- Barnes in 2017
- Born: 14 July 1956 (age 70); London, England
- Scientific career
- Fields: Economic geography

Trevor John Barnes, FBA (born 14 July 1956, London, England) is a British geographer and Professor of Economic geography at the University of British Columbia.

== Background ==
Trevor Barnes received his MA and Ph.D. in geography in 1983 at University of Minnesota with a thesis under the supervision of Eric Sheppard titled The Geography of Value, Production, and Distribution: Theoretical Economic Geography after Sraffa. Barnes began his career as a spatial scientist, but in recent years his interest has moved to the history of economic geography. His current projects concern the history of geography's quantitative revolution; epistemological pluralism in economic geography; the institutional analysis of forestry with Roger Hayter; and creative industries. His co-edited volume, Writing Worlds helped initiate geography's turn towards questions of discourse; it has been widely cited by researchers studying the geography of media and communication. In 2014 he was elected a Corresponding Fellow of the British Academy.

== Recognition ==
In 2019, Barnes was awarded the Royal Geographical Society's Founder’s Medal for his "sustained excellence and pioneering developments in the field of economic geography".

Barnes is considered by notable geographers as a "Key Thinker on Space and Place" and in 2011 was made a Fellow of the Royal Society of Canada. In 2012, he was given the Ellen Churchill Semple award at the Department of Geography, University of Kentucky.

== Publications ==
- Sheppard, E., and Barnes, T.J. The Capitalist Space Economy: Geographical Analysis After Ricardo, Marx and Sraffa. London: Unwin Hyman, 1990.
- Barnes, T.J., and Duncan, J.S. (eds.) Writing Worlds: Texts, Discourses and Metaphors in the Interpretation of Landscape. London: Routledge, 1992.
- Barnes, T. J. Logics of Dislocation: Models, Metaphors, and Meanings of Economic Space. New York: The Guilford Press, 1995.
- Barnes, T.J., Gregory, D. (eds.) Reading Human Geography: The Poetics and Politics of Inquiry. New York: Wiley, 1997.
- Barnes, T. J. and Hayter, R. (eds.) Troubles in the Rainforest: British Columbia's Forest Economy in Transition. Victoria: Western Geographical Press, 1997.
- Barnes, T. J. and Gertler, M. S. (eds.) The New Industrial Geography: Regions, Regulation and Institutions. London: Routledge, 1999.
- Sheppard, E. and Barnes, T. J. (eds.) A Companion to Economic Geography. Oxford: Blackwell, 2000.
- Barnes, T. J., Peck, J., Sheppard, E., and Tickell, A. (eds.) Reading Economic Geography. Oxford: Blackwell, 2003.
- Tickell, A., Sheppard, E., Peck, J., and Barnes, T. J. (eds.) Politics and Practice in Economic Geography. London:Sage, 2007.
- Barnes, T. J., Peck, J., and Sheppard, E. (eds.) The Wiley-Blackwell Companion to Economic Geography. Chichester: Wiley-Blackwell, 2012.
