= Denise Pumain =

French geographer & academic

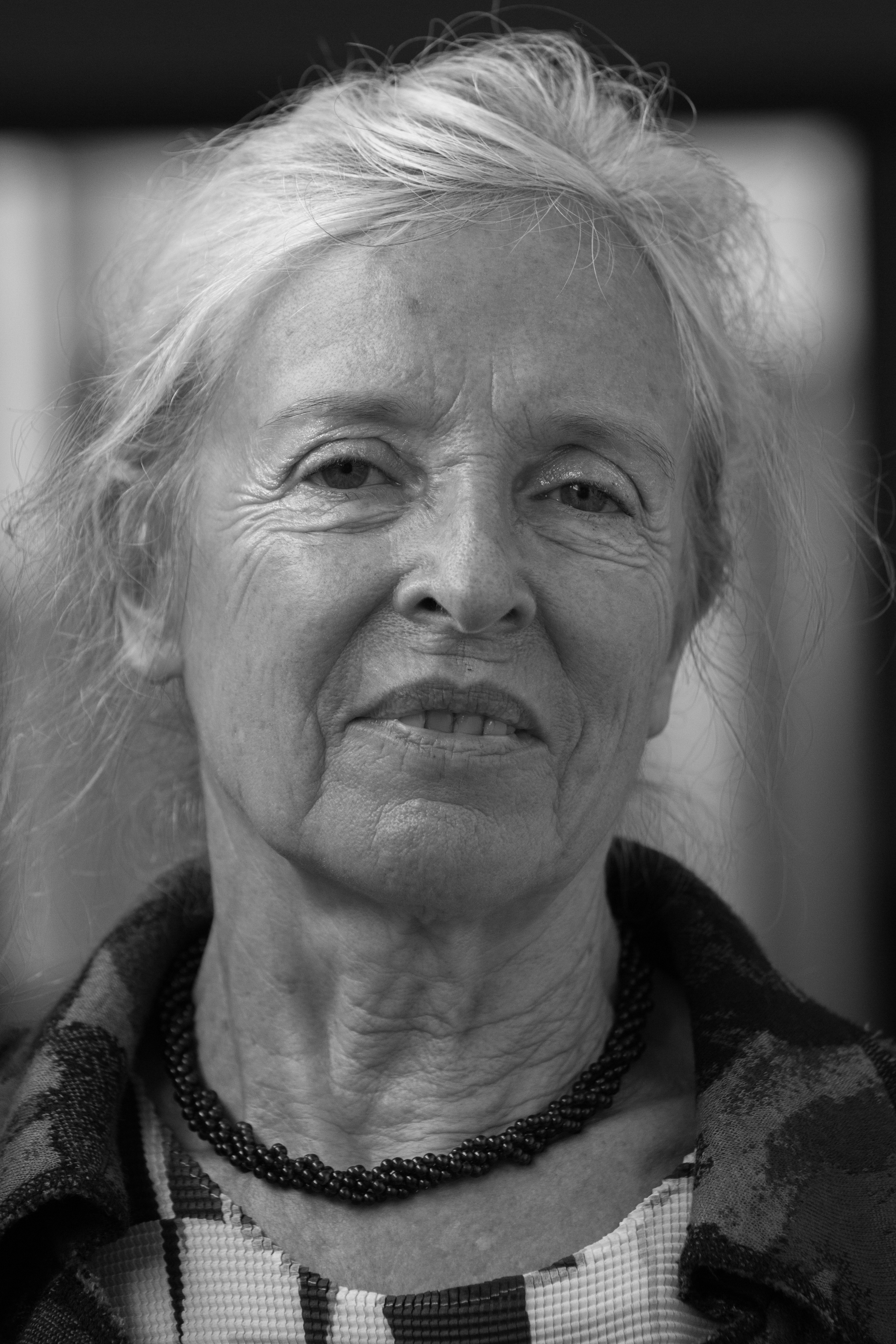
- Denise Pumain in October 2013 (photo by Claude Truong-Ngoc)
- Born: 1946 (age 79–80)
- Occupation: Geographer

Denise Pumain (born 1946) is a French geographer. Pumain specialises in urban and theoretical geography. She is a member of the Austrian Academy of Sciences and of the British Academy.

== Early life and education ==
Pumain was born in 1946. She studied geography at the École Normale Supérieure between 1965 and 1969 and received her doctorate in human sciences and literature in 1980.

== Career ==
She began teaching at the Paris 1 Panthéon-Sorbonne University in 1970. She became a researcher for the Institut national d'études démographiques in 1981 until 1986. In 1986, she became a Professor at the Paris 13 University before returning to the Paris 1 Pantheon-Sorbonne University to teach in 1989. She also held the post of rector at the Académie de Grenoble between 2000 and 2001. In 1996, she founded the geography journal Cybergeo.

She was awarded with a CNRS Bronze medal in 1984, decorated as a Chevalier of the Order of the Légion d'honneur in 1999 and decorated as an officer of the National Order of Merit in 2009. Pumain also became a member of the Academia Europaea in 1995, became a Corresponding Member of the Austrian Academy of Sciences in 2009 and became a Corresponding Fellow of the British Academy in 2012. In 2010, she won the Vautrin Lud Prize and also received an Advanced Grant from the European Research Council to research different urban dynamics in cities across the world.
