= Philippe Pinchemel =

French geographer (1923–2008)

Philippe Pinchemel (10 June 1923 – 16 March 2008) was a French geographer. He received the Lauréat Prix International de Géographie Vautrin Lud in 2004.
