= Eric Sheppard =

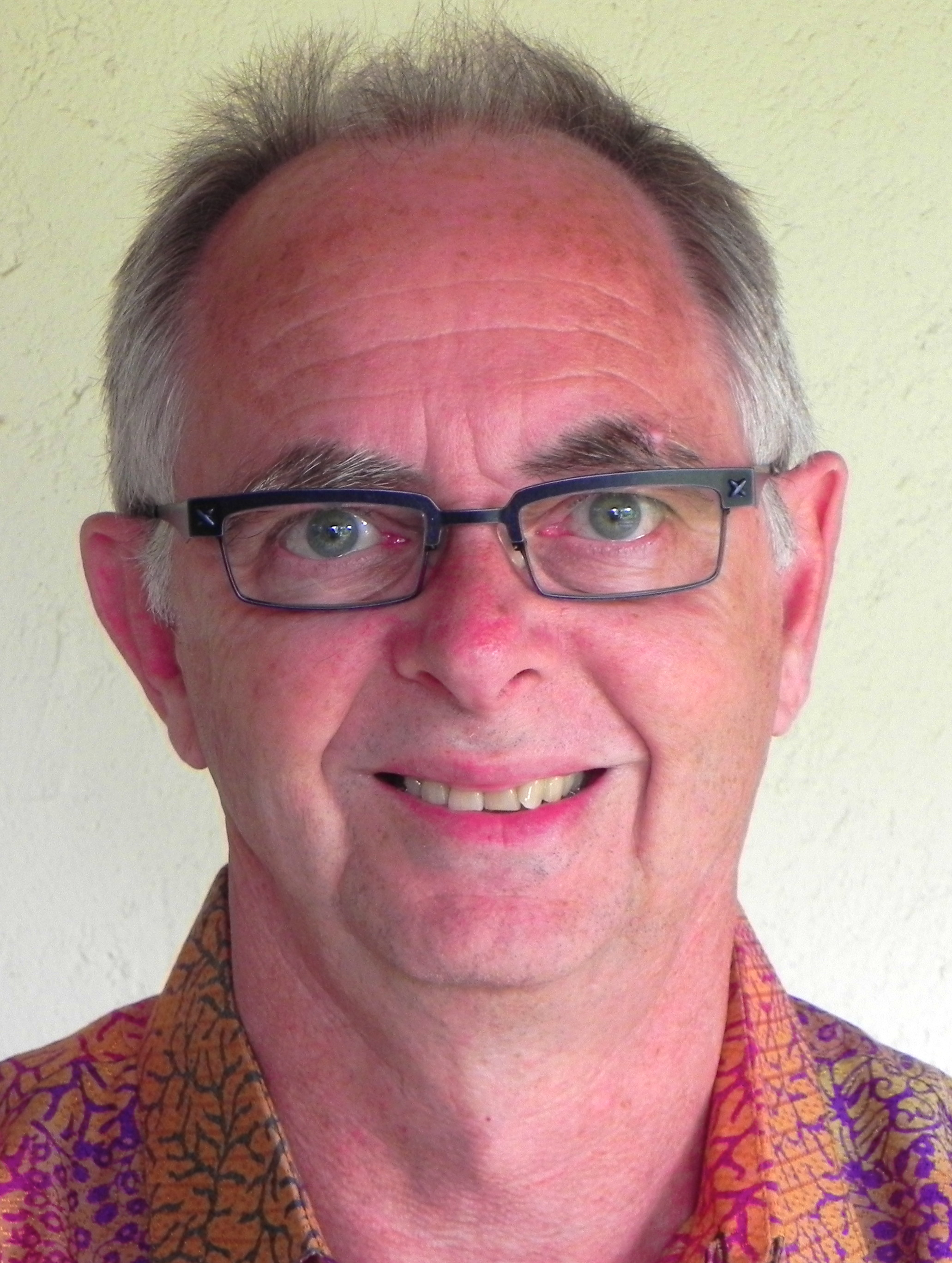
- Eric Sheppard, 2025
- Born: October 1, 1950 (age 75); Cambridge, England
- Education: Bristol University (BS); University of Toronto (MA, PhD)
- Scientific career
- Fields: Economic geography
- Workplaces: University of California, Los Angeles

Eric Sheppard (born 1 October 1950) is a British and American geographer, currently Distinguished Research Professor of Economic geography at UCLA.

== Background ==
Sheppard grew up in Cambridge, England, the son of Norman Sheppard and Kay McClean/Sheppard. He studied geography at the University of Bristol under Andy Cliff and Peter Haggett, graduating in 1972. He moved to the University of Toronto, where he completed his MA in 1974 and Ph.D. in geography in 1976, advised by Leslie Curry, Ross MacKinnon and Allen Scott. He taught at the University of Minnesota from 1976 to 2012, where he was appointed Regents Professor, before being appointed to the Alexander von Humboldt Chair of Geography at UCLA, 2012-2022. He served as president of the Association of American Geographers (2012-2013).

== Contributions ==
Sheppard has made contributions to geographical political economy, uneven geographies of globalization, spatial capitalist economic dynamics, urban sustainability and environmental justice, and the use of critical geographic information technologies. He is identified with a group of radical economic geographers including Trevor J. Barnes and Jamie Peck, who are critical of the tendency of the modern capitalist economy to create great differences in wealth and poverty, and to create environmental problems and injustices.

== Awards ==
- Distinguished Scholarship Honors, Association of American Geographers (1999)
- Ellen Churchill Semple award, Department of Geography, University of Kentucky, 2000
- Fellow, Center for Advanced Studies in the Social and Behavioral Sciences, Stanford University (2005-6)
- Regents Professor, University of Minnesota (2008–12)

== Publications ==
- Urban Studies Inside-out (co-edited with H. Leitner and J. Peck). London: Sage, 2020.
- Spatial Histories of Radical Geography: North America and Beyond (co-edited with T. Barnes). Oxford: Wiley-Blackwell, 2019.
- Limits to Globalization: Geographical disruptions of capitalist development. Oxford: Oxford University Press, 2016, 212 pp. AAG Meridian Book Prize, 2017
- The Wiley-Blackwell Companion to Economic Geography (co-edited with T. Barnes and J. Peck). London: Wiley-Blackwell, 2012.
- A World of Difference: Encountering and contesting development (second, fully revised and expanded edition with P. W. Porter, R. Nagar and D. Faust). New York: Guilford Press, 2009, 664 pp.
- A Companion to Economic Geography (co-edited with T. Barnes). Oxford: Basil Blackwell, 2000, 2003. 590 pp. (translated into Chinese, published by the Commercial Press of China, 2008)
- Reading Economic Geography (co--edited with T. Barnes, J. Peck and A. Tickell). Oxford: Blackwell, 2004, 432 pp. (translated into Chinese, published by the Commercial Press of China, 2007)
- Contesting Neoliberalism: Urban Frontiers (co-edited with H. Leitner and J. Peck). New York: Guilford Press, 2007, 340 pp.
- Politics and Practice in Economic Geography (co-edited with T. Barnes, J. Peck and A. Tickell). Beverly Hills: Sage Publishers, 2007, 320 pp.
- Scale and Geographic Inquiry (co-edited with R. B. McMaster). Oxford: Blackwell, 2004, 272 pp.
- A World of Difference: Society, Nature, Development (with P. W. Porter). New York: Guilford Press, 1998, 614 pp.
- Rediscovering Geography: New relevance for the new century (with T. Wilbanks and 14 others). Washington DC: National Research Council, 1996. 233 pp.
- The Capitalist Space Economy: Geographical Analysis after Ricardo Marx and Sraffa (with T. J. Barnes). London: Unwin and Hyman, 1990. 328 pp.

- Geography or economics? Conceptions of space, time, interdependence, and agency.'' In: Gordon L. Clark, Maryann P. Feldman and Meric S. Gertler (editors). The Oxford handbook of economic geography. Oxford (England): Oxford University Press, 2000. ISBN 0-19-823410-4
