= Peter Gould (geographer) =

American geographer and professor (1932–2000)

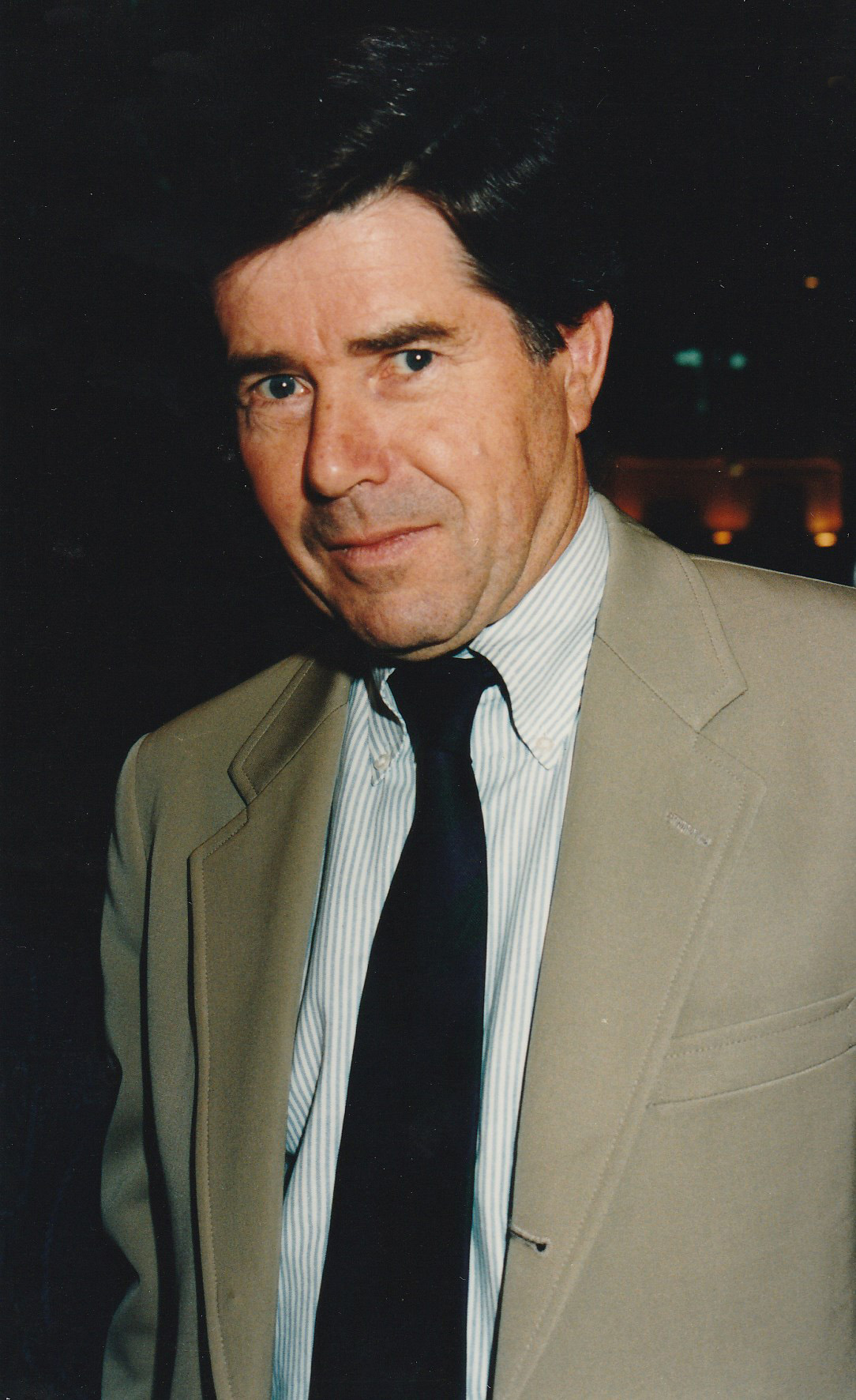
- Gould in 1997
- Born: November 18, 1932; Coulsdon, Surrey, England
- Died: January 22, 2000 (aged 67)
- Education: Colgate University (BA); Northwestern University (MA, PhD)
- Occupations: Geographer, professor
- Awards: Vautrin Lud Prize (1993)
- Scientific career
- Fields: Geography

Peter Gould (November 18, 1932 – January 22, 2000) was an Evan Pugh Professor Emeritus of Geography at Penn State University. Throughout his tenure at Penn State University, Gould received many awards including the Lauréat Prix International de Géographie Vautrin Lud, the Retzius Gold Medal of the Swedish Society for Anthropology and Geography, as well as an honorary Doctor of Science from the Universitaire de Strasbourg. Dr. Gould was a main contributor to the quantitative revolution in the field of Geography.

== History ==
Born in 1932 in Coulsdon, Surrey, Peter Gould decided he was going to become a geographer at a fairly young age. He graduated from Colgate University in 1956 with a BA (summa cum laude, Phi Beta Kappa). He attended Northwestern University for both his MA, and PhD.

== Legacy ==
Professor Gould is still well known for his work with spatial analysis, and mental maps. His research on dynamic structures of geographic space and on television in particular constitute early building blocks for researching the geography of media and communication. The Peter R. Gould Center for Geography Education and Outreach within the Department of Geography at the Pennsylvania State University was named in his honor. Colgate University's Geography Department gives a Peter Gould Award in Geography annually.

== Bibliography ==
- Gould, Peter (1969). Spatial Diffusion (Commission on College Geography Resource Paper No. 4). Washington, D.C.: Association of American Geographers.
- Abler, Ronald F.; Adams, John S.; Gould, Peter (1971). Spatial Organization: The Geographer's View of the World. Englewood Cliffs: Prentice-Hall.
- Gould, Peter; White, Rodney (1974). Mental Maps. Harmondsworth: Penguin Books.
- Gould, Peter (1975). People in Information Space: The Mental Maps and Information Surfaces of Sweden (Lund Studies in Geography Series B Human Geography No. 42). Lund: The Royal University of Lund Department of Geography.
- Gould, Peter.; Johnson, Jeffrey; Chapman, Graham (1984). The Structure of Television. London: Pion Ltd.
- Gould, Peter (1985). The Geographer at Work. London: Routledge.
- Gould, Peter; White, Rodney (1986). Mental Maps (2nd ed.). London: Routledge.
- Gould, Peter (1990). Fire in the Rain: The Democratic Consequences of Chernobyl. Baltimore: Johns Hopkins University Press.
- Cliff, A.D.; Gould, Peter; Hoare, Anthony G.; Thrift, Nigel, eds. (1991). Diffusing Geography: Essays Presented to Peter Haggett. New York: John Wiley and Sons.
- Gould, Peter (1993). The Slow Plague: A Geography of the AIDS Epidemic. New York: John Wiley and Sons.
- Gould, Peter (1999). Becoming a Geographer. Syracuse: Syracuse University Press.
- Gould, Peter; Pitts, Forrest, eds. (2002). Geographical Voices: Fourteen Autobiographical Essays. Syracuse: Syracuse University Press.
