= Jean-Bernard Racine =

Swiss geographer and academic (1940–2026)

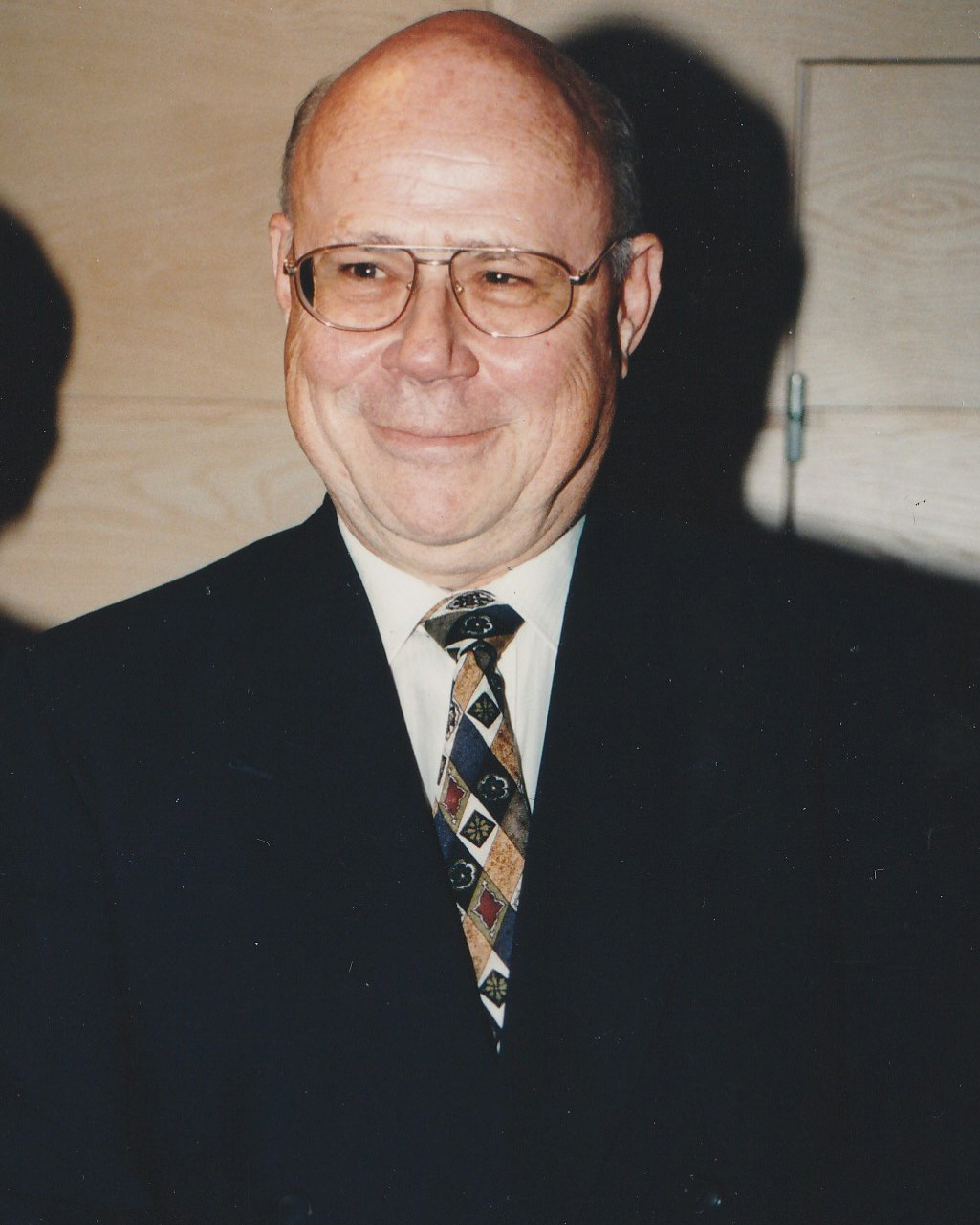
- Racine in 1997
- Born: 29 April 1940; Neuchâtel, Switzerland
- Died: 23 March 2026 (aged 85)
- Awards: Vautrin Lud International Geography Prize (1997)
- Scientific career
- Fields: Geography
- Workplaces: University of Lausanne

Jean-Bernard Racine (29 April 1940 – 23 March 2026) was a Swiss geographer and academic who was a professor of geography at the Institute of Geography, Faculty of Geosciences and Environment of the University of Lausanne (UNIL) and at HEC Lausanne Business School. He was a professor at the University of Sherbrooke between 1965 and 1969, and at the University of Ottawa from 1969 to 1973.

== Life and career ==
Racine received his first PhD in geography from the University of Aix-en-Provence (1965) and his State PhD in geography (1973) from the University of Nice. He was the author of many articles and books in the fields of quantitative geography, epistemology and social geography. Influenced by Brian Berry, Walter Isard, Peter Gould and David Harvey, he published L’Analyse quantitative en géographie in 1973 with H. Reymond and was widely considered one of the pioneers of the “new geography” in the 1970s in the Francophone world. Racine also contributed to the development of epistemology in the social sciences as evidenced by his 1981 book called Problématiques de la géographie published with H. Isnard and H. Reymond. In the 1990s and 2000s, his interests moved again, to become concerned with issues of social and cultural geography: La ville entre Dieu et les hommes was published in 1993.

He received the Vautrin Lud International Geography Prize (France) in 1997. He also held an honorary doctorate from Iasi (Romania).

Racine died on 23 March 2026, at the age of 85.

== Articles ==
- 1967. Exurbanisation et métamorphisme périurbain: introduction à l’étude de la croissance urbaine au sud du Saint-Laurent. Revue de Géographie de Montréal XXI/2: 313–342.
- 1973. La centralité commerciale relative des municipalités du système métropolitain montréalais: un exemple d’utilisation des méthodes d’analyse statistique en géographie. L’Espace Géographique 4: 275–289.
- 1973. L’analyse quantitative en géographie. Paris, PUF (with H. Reymond).
- 1977. Discours idéologique et discours géographiques: perspectives épistémologiques et critiques. Hérodote 6: 109–159.
- 1978. Des directions (encore) nouvelles pour la géographie moderne. Annales de Géographie 87/1: 182–194 (with C. Raffestin).
- 1979. La géographie et l’espace géographique: à la recherche d’une épistémologie de la géographie. L’Espace Géographique VIII/4: 283–292 (with A. Bailly).
- 1981. Problématiques de la géographie. Paris, PUF (with H. Isnard and H. Reymond).
- 1984. La géographie urbaine Anglo-saxonne: manuels des années 80. L’Espace Géographique XIII/4: 379–381.
- 1990. Nouvelle Géographie de la Suisse et des Suisses. Lausanne, Payot (with C. Raffestin).
- 1993. Le Canada, in R. Brunet (ed.) Etats-Unis/Canada. Géographie Universelle 4. Paris, Hachette/Reclus (with P. Villeneuve).
- 1993. La ville entre Dieu et les hommes. Paris, Anthropos-Economica.
- 1999. The foreigner and the city. From co-presence to interaction, in A. Aguilar and I. Escamilla (eds) Problems of Megacities: Social inequalities, Environmental risk and Urban governance. Mexico City: UGI: 477–498 (with C. Mager).
- 1999. Ways of Writing Geographies, in A. Buttimer, S. D. Brunn and U. Wardenga (eds) Text and Image, Social Construction of Regional Knowledges. Leipzig, Institut für Länderkunde: 266–279 (with L. Mondada).
- 2000. Integrated Urban Systems and Sustainability of Urban Life. Bucarest, Editura Tehnicà (with D. Pumain and I. Janos).
- 2002. Migration, Places and intercultural Relations in Cities, in I. Schnell and W. Ostendorf, (eds) Studies in Segregation and Desegregation. Aldershot, Ashgate: 67–85.
- 2003. Explaining, Regulating or Monitoring Violence in the Cities of Tomorrow. Monitoring Cities: International Perspectives, Calgary, IGU Urban Commission: 557–598.
- 2003. Géographie et religions: une approche territoriale du religieux et du sacré. L'Information géographique 3: 193–221 (with O. Walther).
- 2004. Urban Violence. A challenge for geographers? Geographica Helvetica 3: 178–191.
- 2004. Lausanne entre les lignes. Exploration d’une géographie littéraire, in B. Lévy and C. Raffestin (eds) Voyage en ville d’Europe. Geneva, Métropolis: 75–132.
- 2006. Response, in J.W. Crampton, S. Elden (eds) Space, knowledge and power: Foucault and geography. Aldershot, Ashgate: 31–34 (with C. Raffestin).
- 2006. Geografia de las religiones, in Hiernaux D, Lindon A. (eds). Tratado de Geografia Humana. Mexico, Anthropos : 481–505 (with O. Walther).
- 2007. Situations de handicap et rapports au territoire, in Borioli B, Laub R. (eds) Handicap : de la différence à la singularité. Enjeux au quotidien. Geneva, Editions Médecine & Hygiène : 119–134.
- 2008. Projet urbain et démarche participative : contribution géographique à la possibilité de choisir sa ville aujourd’hui. Quelques leçons de l’expérience lausannoise. Bulletin de la Société de géographie de Liège 50: 5–15.
- 2008. La ville et l’urbain à l’aube d’un nouveau siècle : une géographie au cœur de l’ensemble des sciences humaines. Geographica Helvetica 63(4): 272–278.
- 2010. Villes et spiritualités : décrypter les projets derrière les objets. Mondes intérieurs et productions d’urbanité, in Bourg D, Roch P. (eds) Crise écologique, crise des valeurs ? Défis pour l’anthropologie et la spiritualité. Geneva, Labor et Fides: 295–309.
- 2010. Géographie, éthique et valeurs: invitation à la réflexion et à l'action. Géographie et Cultures 74: 27–42.
- 2011. Un 'droit de cité' pour les tout-petits? Penser et bien vivre la petite enfance au coeur de la ville, in Reinberg O, Blanc V. (eds) Un accident est si vite...évité! Lausanne, University Hospital of Lausanne (CHUV): 44–66.
- 2011. Villes, tourisme et élaboration d’images de marques : recherche et partage d’une identité pour publicité du territoire; les leçons du cas lausannois, in Bleton-Ruget A, Commercon N, Lefort I. (eds) Tourismes et territoires. Institut de Recherche du Val de Saône-Mâconnais: 189–198
- 2013. La démarche participative dans le projet Métamorphose de Lausanne, in Masson-Vincent M, Dubus N. (eds) Géogouvernance, Utilité sociale de l’analyse spatiale. Paris, Quae: 19–34.
- 2014. Le paysage à l’épreuve de l’urbain. Paysage, géographie, éthique: invitation à la réflexion et à l’action, in Martinelli A. (ed.) Paesaggio senza identità? Per una geografia del projetto locale. Monte Verità, GEA-associazione di geographia: 15–49.
- 2015. Villes et jardins, un nouvel art de penser le destin de nos villes? Quelques leçons de l'expérience lausannoise. Bloc notes 65: 143–160.
