= Vautrin Lud Prize =

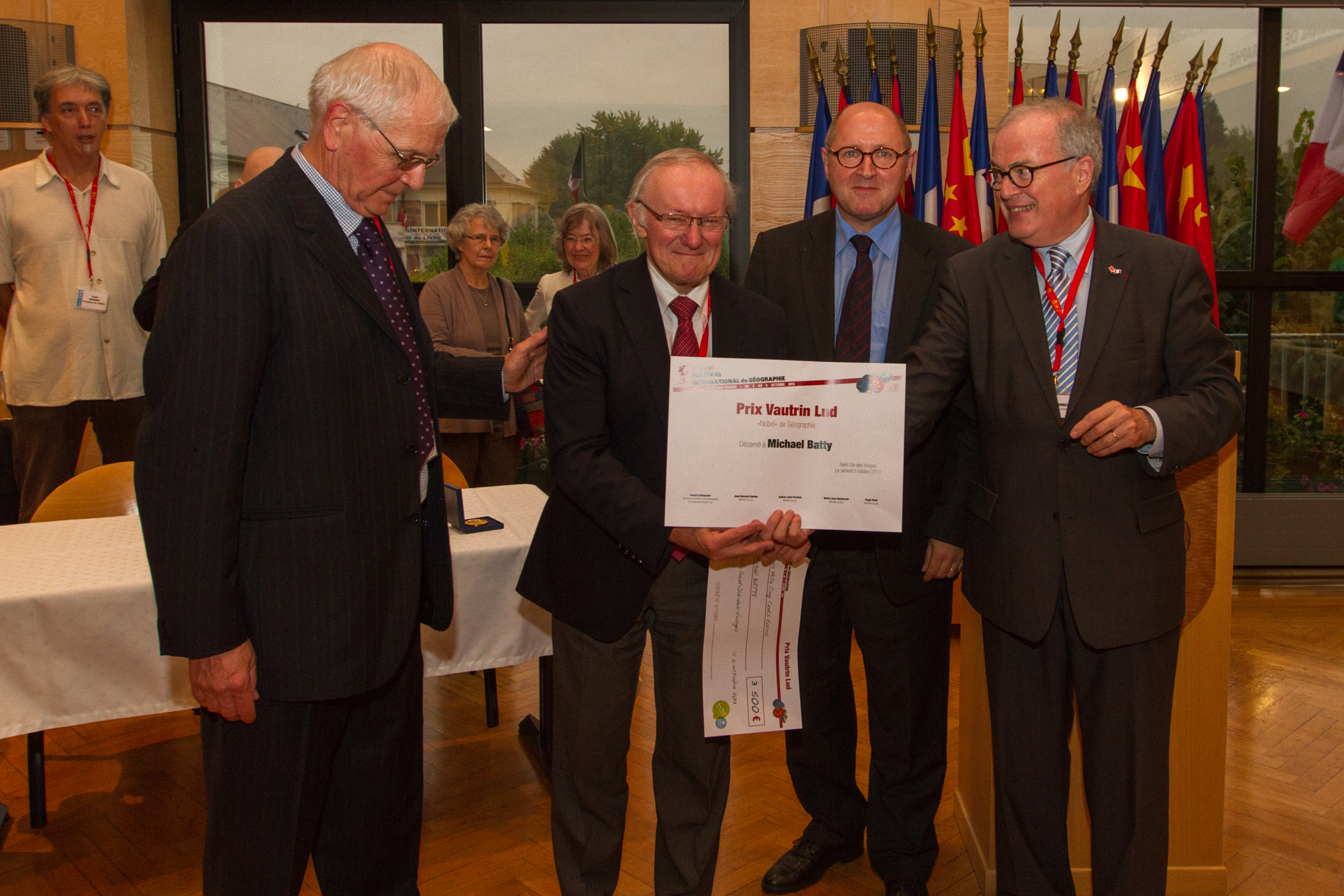
- Michael Batty being awarded the 2013 Vautrin Lud Prize
- Awarded for: Awarded for outstanding achievements in the field of geography
- Presented by: An independent, five person jury
- First award: 1991; 35 years ago
- No. of laureates: 34 Prizes to 36 Laureates as of 2025

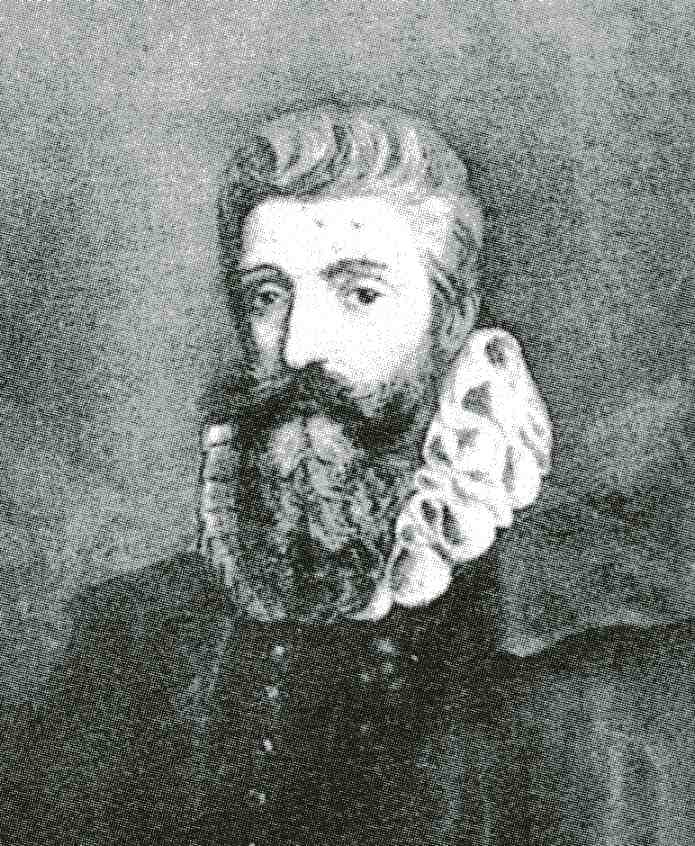
Vautrin Lud

The Prix International de Géographie Vautrin-Lud, known in English as the Vautrin Lud Prize, is the highest award in the field of geography. Established in 1991, the award is named after the 16th Century French scholar Vautrin Lud, who first named, in 1507, the new continent explored by Amerigo Vespucci "America". The award is given in the autumn of each year at the International Geography Festival in Saint-Dié-des-Vosges, France (the home town of Vautrin Lud) and decided upon by a five-person international jury.

== Recipients ==
Name	Country	Year
Peter Haggett	UK	1991
Torsten Hägerstrand and Gilbert F. White	Sweden and US	1992
Peter Gould	US	1993
Milton Santos	Brazil	1994
David Harvey	UK	1995
Roger Brunet and Paul Claval	France	1996
Jean-Bernard Racine	Switzerland	1997
Doreen Massey	UK	1998
Ron J. Johnston	UK	1999
Yves Lacoste	France	2000
Sir Peter Hall	UK	2001
Bruno Messerli	Switzerland	2002
Allen J. Scott	US	2003
Philippe Pinchemel	France	2004
Brian J. L. Berry	US	2005
Heinz Wanner	Switzerland	2006
Mike Goodchild	UK	2007
Horacio Capel Sáez	Spain	2008
Terry McGee	Canada	2009
Denise Pumain	France	2010
Antoine Bailly	Switzerland	2011
Yi-Fu Tuan	China – US	2012
Michael Batty	UK	2013
Anne Buttimer	Ireland	2014
Edward Soja	US	2015
Maria Dolors García Ramón	Spain	2016
Akin Mabogunje	Nigeria	2017
Jacques Lévy	France	2018
John A. Agnew	UK – US	2019
Rudolf Brázdil	Czech Republic	2020
Brenda Yeoh	Singapore	2021
Michael Storper	France – US	2022
Jamie Peck	Canada – UK	2023
Ron Boschma	Netherlands	2024
Anssi Paasi	Finland	2025
Karen Seto	US	2026

== See also ==
- List of geography awards
- International Geographical Union
- Victoria Medal
- Murchison Award
- Hubbard Medal
