= Connecticut Academy of Science and Engineering =

American non-profit institution

- Formation: 1976
- Headquarters: East Hartford, Connecticut
- Members: 440
- Revenue: $250,041 (2020)
- Staff: 2
- Website: https://ctcase.org/

The Connecticut Academy of Science and Engineering (CASE) is a 501(c)3 non-profit institution patterned after the National Academy of Sciences to identify, study, and provide expert guidance on science and technological advancements that are or should be of concern to the state of Connecticut. It was founded in 1976 by Special Act (No. 76-53) of the Connecticut General Assembly.

== Goals ==
The academy's goals are: to provide information and advice on science and technology to the government, industry and people of Connecticut; to initiate activities that foster science and engineering education of the highest quality, and promote interest in science and engineering on the part of the public, especially young people; and to provide opportunities for both specialized and inter-disciplinary discourse among its own members, members of the broader technical community, and the community at large.

== Membership ==
The academy's membership limit is determined by its bylaws. Members must live or work in Connecticut. New members are elected by the current membership on the following criteria: scientific distinction achieved through significant original contribution in theory or application, and/or unusual accomplishments in the pioneering of new and developing fields of applied science and technology.
