= Terry McGee =

New Zealand geographer (1936–2025)

Terence Gary McGee (5 January 1936 – 26 June 2025) was a New Zealand urban geographer and social scientist.

== Life and career ==
McGee was born in Cambridge, New Zealand on 5 January 1936. He studied geography and history in his bachelor's degree at then-Victoria College of the University of New Zealand (now Victoria University of Wellington). His master's degree, also at Victoria University of Wellington, researched the Indian immigrants living in Wellington. While teaching at University of Malaya from 1959 to 1965, McGee also researched the migration of Malays to Kuala Lumpur which would later be used towards his doctoral research. He studied under Keith Buchanan for his doctoral degree at Victoria University of Wellington, which was completed in 1969. McGee taught at University of Hong Kong from 1968 to 1973 before moving to teach at Australian National University from 1973 to 1978. He moved to Vancouver in 1978 to take up the director role of the Institute of Asian Research at the University of British Columbia, which he had held for numerous years. He had also served as President of The Canadian Association of Geographers from 1989 to 1990. He retired in 2001. After retirement, he worked on an international development project to improve governance systems in Brazil's megacities between 2003 and 2006. He also co-published a book on urban spaces in China with his former graduate students.

=== Personal life and death ===
McGee was married to his wife Lori for 50 years. They had two children and six grandchildren.

McGee died on 26 June 2025, at the age of 89.

== Key themes ==
McGee's major academic work had mainly been in the following areas:

- the geography of Southeast Asian cities
- the informal economy in developing countries;
- systems of food distribution in developing countries' cities;
- the emergence of extended metropolitan regions.
- rural-urban migration

== Key publications ==
His major publications included:

- (1967) The Southeast Asian city: a social geography of the primate cities of Southeast Asia, London, Bell
- (1971) The Urbanization Process in the Third World, T. G. McGee. G. Bell and Sons, Ltd., London
- (1985) Theatres of Accumulation: Studies in Asian and Latin American Urbanization, together with Warwick Armstrong, London: Methuen

== Awards ==
In 2000, McGee received the Award for Scholarly Distinction in Geography from the Canadian Association of Geographers (CAG). In 2009, he was the recipient of the Lauréat Prix International de Géographie Vautrin Lud.

== Other sources ==
- Institute of Asian Research
- Kelly, P.F. (editor) (2007): Essays in Honour of T.G. McGee. Asia Pacific Viewpoint.
