= Anne Buttimer =

Irish geographer

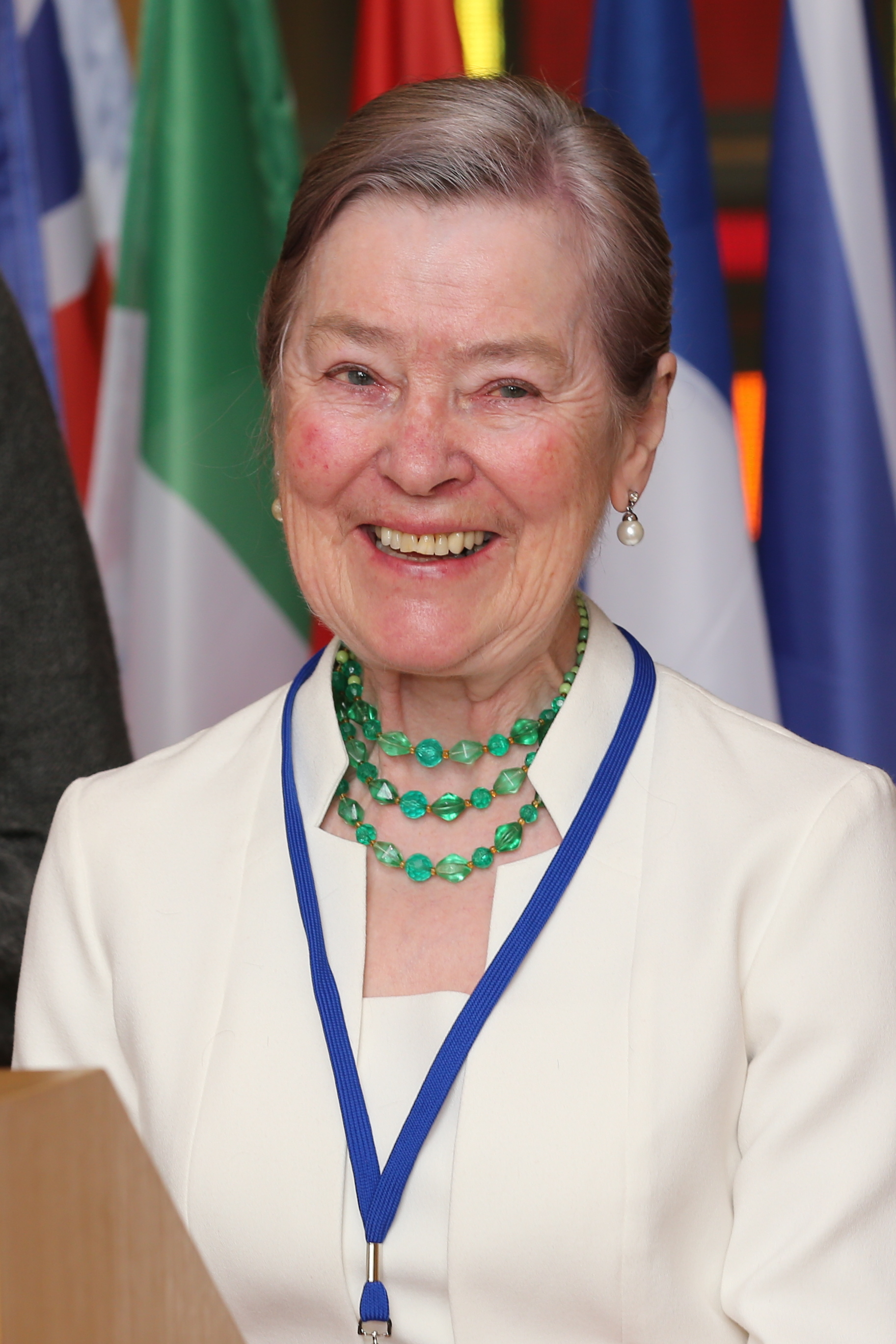
- Buttimer in 2014
- Born: October 31, 1938; Cork, Ireland
- Died: July 15, 2017 (aged 78); Dublin, Ireland
- Education: University College Cork; University of Washington
- Scientific career
- Fields: Geography
- Workplaces: Seattle University; Grenoble Alpes University; University of Texas; Lund University; Clark University

Anne Buttimer (31 October 1938 – 15 July 2017) was an Irish geographer. She was emeritus professor of geography at University College, Dublin.

== Background ==
Buttimer grew up in Ireland with strong Catholic convictions. She studied at University College Cork (BA, geography, Latin and mathematics 1957) and the National University of Ireland (master's in geography, 1959). After this, she joined the Dominican Order and moved to Seattle. She remained in the order for 17 years.

Her PhD in geography was from the University of Washington in 1965 and concerned conceptual and methodological foundations for social geography. She was a postdoctoral fellow at the University of Louvain and from 1966 to 1968 worked as an assistant professor at the Seattle University.

She spent two years at the University of Glasgow working in the social geography of housing, before joining Clark University from 1970 to 1981, where she firmly established a reputation as a social geographer and social scientist. In 1982 she was based in Lund as a research fellow of the Swedish Council for Humanities and Social Sciences, then briefly a professor at the Université d'Ottawa (1989–91) before moving to University College Dublin 1991–2003. A multilingual scholar, she has also held numerous short-term positions in Europe.

She was president of the IGU 2000–2004 and the first geographer to be vice-president of Academia Europaea in 2012.

== Scholarship ==
In the early part of her career, the quantitative revolution occupied social scientists, and Buttimer trained in this tradition at Washington before moving beyond it towards philosophical themes at the intersection of the bio-physical and human sciences. These shaped her research directions in spirituality, social geography, and particularly the humanistic documentation of everyday life experiences. These areas served as a model for the ways in which geographers can bridge the theory-practice divide.

Her contributions have been to history and philosophy of science, urban and social geography, migration and identity, environmental experience, nature and culture, environment and sustainable development, and the human dimensions of global change.

She chaired an EU-funded research network on sustainable development that had a significant influence on EU policy debates; her work provided important insights into the ways in which communication between scientists and planners can be improved.

She authored many books and articles on society and space, urban planning, the history of ideas, and environmental policy. She is perhaps best known for her The Practice of Geography (1983) and for combining French, Swedish, and anglophone academic traditions in the study of humanity and environment.

In 2014, she was awarded the Vautrin Lud Prize, colloquially called the "Nobel Prize for Geography".

She died on 15 July 2017.

== Recognition ==
- UCC alumni award 2016, Conference of Irish Geographers.
- Vautrin Lud Prize, 2014.
- Lifetime achievement honours, Association of American Geographers, 2014.
- Docteur, honoris causa, Université Joseph Fourier, Grenoble (the first woman recipient).
- Wahlberg Medal, Swedish Society for Anthropology and Geography, 2009.
- Doctor honoris causa, Tartu University 2004.
- Fellow, Royal Irish Academy 2000–.
- Royal Scottish Geographical Society Millennium Award, 2000.
- Doctor, honoris causa, University of Joensuu, 1999.
- Royal Geographical Society Murchison Award, 1997.
- Ellen Churchill Semple award, Department of Geography, University of Kentucky, 1991.
- Association of American Geographers, Honors Award 1986.
- Fulbright Hays Visiting Professor in Social Ecology to Sweden, 1976.

== Publications ==
- Buttimer, A. and T. Mels. 2006. By Northern Lights. On the Making of Geography in Sweden. London: Ashgate Press.
- Buttimer A. (ed.) 2001. Sustainable Landscapes and Lifeways: Issues of Scale and Appropriateness. Cork University Press.
- Buttimer, A., S. Brunn and U. Wardenga. 2000. Text and image: Social construction of regional knowledges. Leipzig: Inst.für Länderkunde.
- Buttimer, A. and Wallin, L. 1999. Nature and Identity in Cross-Cultural Perspective. Dordrecht: Kluwer.
- Buttimer, A. 1993. Geography and the Human Spirit. The Johns Hopkins University Press.
- Buttimer, A. 1991. Land-Life-Lumber-Leisure. Ottawa, Ont.: Royal Society of Canada.
- Buttimer, A. 1990. "Geography, humanism and global concern." Annals of the Association of American Geographers 80: 1–33.
- Buttimer, A.. 1988. The wake of Erasmus. Saints, scholars and studia in Mediaeval Norden. Lund: Lund University Press.
- Buttimer, A. and T. Hägerstrand. 1988. Geographers of Norden. Reflections on Career Experiences. Lund University Press.
- Buttimer, A. 1983. Creativity and context. Lund Studies in Human Geography, Ser. B, No. 50.
- Buttimer, A. 1983. The practice of geography. London: Longman. (Russian. 1990)
- Buttimer, A. and D. Seamon. 1980. The human experience of place and space. London: Croom Helm Publishers.
- Buttimer, A. 1976. "Grasping the dynamism of lifeworld." Annals of the Association of American Geographers 66: 277–292.
- Buttimer, A. 1974. Values in Geography. Washington, D.C., Commission on College Geography.
- Buttimer, A. 1971. Society and Milieu in the French Geographic Tradition. Chicago: Rand McNally. (Spanish, 1971)
