= Ellen Churchill Semple =

American geographer (1863–1932)

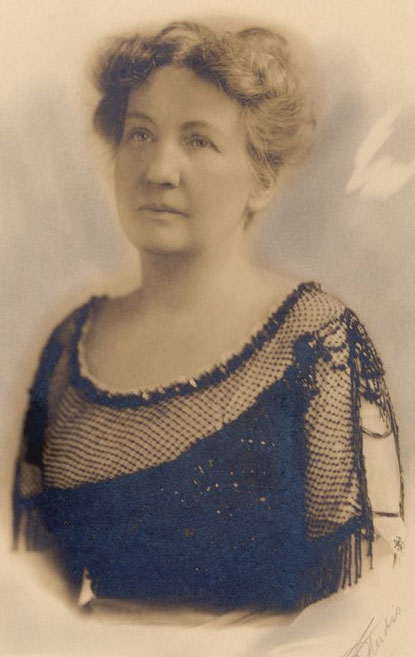
- Semple in 1914
- Born: January 8, 1863; Louisville, Kentucky, U.S.
- Died: May 8, 1932 (aged 69); West Palm Beach, Florida, U.S.
- Resting place: Cave Hill Cemetery; Louisville, Kentucky, U.S.
- Education: Vassar College
- Scientific career
- Fields: Geography
- Institutions: University of Chicago; Clark University

Ellen Churchill Semple (January 8, 1863 – May 8, 1932) was an American geographer and the first female president of the Association of American Geographers. She contributed significantly to the early development of the discipline of geography in the United States, particularly studies of human geography. She is most closely associated with work in anthropogeography and environmentalism, and the debate about "environmental determinism".

== Early life and education ==
Ellen Churchill Semple was born on January 8, 1863, in Louisville, Kentucky, the youngest of five children, by Alexander Bonner Semple and Emerine Price.

Semple's early education was guided by her mother, Emerine Semple, as well as private tutors. Semple followed her sister, Patty Semple, to Vassar where she graduated as valedictorian and was the youngest member of her graduating class.

Semple graduated in 1882 with an A.B. in History from Vassar College at the age of 19, and continued on at Vassar to earn an M.A. in History in (1891). She became interested in geography while visiting London, where she encountered the works of Friedrich Ratzel. She went to Germany to seek out Ratzel and study with him at the University of Leipzig. As a woman, she was prohibited from matriculating, but she was able to gain permission to attend Ratzel's lectures, the only woman in a class of five hundred male students. She continued to work with Ratzel and produced several academic papers in American and European journals, but was never conferred a degree.

== Career ==
Semple was the first woman to become president of the Association for American Geographers. Semple was a pioneer in American geography, helping to broaden the discipline's focus beyond physical features of the earth and bringing attention to human aspects of geography. Her innovative approach and theories influenced the development of human geography as a significant subfield and influenced the social sciences across disciplines, including history and anthropology.

Semple taught at the University of Chicago from 1906 to 1920, but her first permanent academic position was offered to her in 1922 at Clark University. She was the first female faculty member, teaching graduate students in geography for the next decade, but her salary was always significantly less than her male colleagues. She also lectured at the University of Oxford in 1912 and 1922.

Her first book, American History and its Geographic Conditions (1903) and her second, Influences of Geographic Environment (1911), were widely used textbooks for students of geography and history in the United States at the start of the 20th century.

Semple was a founding member of the Association of American Geographers (AAG) in 1904, and was elected AAG's first female president in 1921.

== Theoretical contributions ==
=== Environmental determinism and anthropogeography ===
"Man is the product of the earth's surface." (Semple 1911, p. 1)

Semple was a key figure in the theory of environmental determinism, along with Ellsworth Huntington and Griffith Taylor. Influenced by the works of Charles Darwin and inspired by her mentor Friedrich Ratzel, Semple theorized that human activity was primarily determined by the physical environment. Although environmental determinism is today heavily critiqued and has lost favor in social theory, it was widely accepted in academia in the late 19th-early 20th centuries. Still, Semple's influence can be seen in the works of many modern-day geographers, including Jared Diamond.

In a series of books and papers she communicated certain aspects of the work of German geographer Friedrich Ratzel to the Anglophone community. Standard disciplinary accounts often attribute to Semple a prevailing interest in environmental determinism, a theory that the physical environment, rather than social conditions, determines culture; however her later work emphasized environmental influences as opposed to the environment's deterministic effect on culture, reflecting broader academic discontent with environmental determinism after the First World War.

In her work Influences of Geographic Environment on the Basis of Ratzel's System of Anthropo-Geography (1911), she describes people and their associated landscapes, dividing the world into key environmental types. Semple identifies four key ways that the physical environment is affected: 1) direct physical effects (climate, altitude); 2) psychical effects (culture, art, religion); 3) economic and social development (resources and livelihoods); 4) movement of people (natural barriers and routes, such as mountains and rivers).

Semple's work also reflects discussions and conflicts within geography and social theory about determinism and race. Indeed, in some works she challenges popular ideas of her time about race determining social and cultural differences, suggesting that environment was a more important factor in cultural development. Semple's theories of environmental determinism have been criticized as overly simplistic and often replicating the same themes of racial determination through "nature". However, Semple's work has more recently been revisited for its early examination of issues which are now central to political ecology.

Semple believed that mankind originated in the tropics but gained full maturity in the temperate regions of the world."where man has remained in the tropics, with few exceptions, he has suffered arrested development. His nursery has kept him a child."

=== Fieldwork ===
Semple conducted fieldwork for her research in Kentucky and the Mediterranean, an innovative practice that was uncommon in geography at the time. From 1911 to 1912, she undertook an eighteen-month journey which visited Japan, Korea, China, the Philippines, Java, Ceylon, India, Egypt, Palestine, Lebanon, and Turkey in addition to places in Europe and the United States. The main focus of the trip was a three-month visit to Japan, facilitated by her Vassar classmate Ōyama Sutematsu, which produced unusually positive depictions of Japan during a period of high anti-Japanese sentiment in the United States. During her fieldwork, she took notes on human-environment relations, cultural features of the landscape, and made detailed observations of housing, structures, livelihoods, and daily life.

== Late life ==
Semple continued to teach geography until her death in 1932. She died on May 8, 1932, in West Palm Beach, Florida, and is buried in the Cave Hill National Cemetery in Louisville.

== Awards and recognition ==
In 1914 Semple received the Cullum Geographic Medal from the American Geographical Society, "in recognition of her distinguished contributions to the science of anthropogeography". She was President of the Association of American Geographers (now the American Association of Geographers) from 1921 to 1922 and was awarded the Helen Culver Gold Medal by the Geographic Society of Chicago, in recognition of her leadership in American geography.

Semple Elementary School in Semple's hometown of Louisville was named in her honor.

== Works ==
- — (1896). Civilization Is at Bottom an Economic Fact.
- — (1897). The Influence of the Appalachian Barrier Upon Colonial History.
- — (1899). "The Development of the Hanse Towns in Relation to Their Geographical Environment". Journal of the American Geographical Society of New York. 31 (3): 236–255. doi:10.2307/197165. ISSN 1536-0407. JSTOR 197165.
- — (1901). "The Anglo-Saxons of the Kentucky Mountains: A Study in Anthropogeography". The Geographical Journal. 17 (6): 588. Bibcode:1901GeogJ..17..588S. doi:10.2307/1775213. JSTOR 1775213.
- — (1902). The Badlands of Tillydrone.
- — (1903). American History and Its Geographic Conditions.
- — (1904). The North-Shore Villages of the Lower St. Lawrence.
- — (1904). The Influence of the Watering Hole Upon Hillhead Halls.
- — (1911). "Influences of Geographic Environment: On the Basis of Ratzel's System of Anthropo-Geography". Nature. 88 (2195): 101. Bibcode:1911Natur..88..101.. doi:10.1038/088101a0.
- — (1915). Barrier Boundary of the Mediterranean Basin and Its Northern Breaches As Factors in History.
- — (1916). "Pirate Coasts of the Mediterranean Sea". Geographical Review. 2 (2): 134. Bibcode:1916GeoRv...2..134S. doi:10.2307/207388. JSTOR 207388.
- — (1918). Texts of the Ukraine "Peace": With Maps.
- — (1919). The Ancient Piedmont Route of Northern Mesopotamia.
- — (1920). The Barbarians of Balnagask.
- — (1921). Geographic Factors in the Ancient Mediterranean Grain Trade.
- — (1922). The Influence of Geographic Conditions Upon Ancient Mediterranean Stock-Raising.
- — (1927). "The Templed Promontories of the Ancient Mediterranean". Geographical Review. 17 (3): 353. Bibcode:1927GeoRv..17..353S. doi:10.2307/208321. JSTOR 208321.
- — (1928). Ancient Mediterranean Agriculture.
- — (1929). "Ancient Mediterranean Pleasure Gardens". Geographical Review. 19 (3): 420. Bibcode:1929GeoRv..19..420S. doi:10.2307/209149. JSTOR 209149.
- — (1931). The Geography of the Mediterranean Region: Its Relation to Ancient History.

== Bibliography ==
- Keighren, Innes M. "Bringing geography to the book: charting the reception of Influences of geographic environment." Transactions of the Institute of British Geographers 31, no. 4 (2006): 525–40.
- Keighren, Innes M. Bringing geography to book: Ellen Semple and the reception of geographical knowledge. London: I.B. Tauris, 2010.
- "Semple, Ellen Churchill." Notable American Women. Vol. 2, 4th ed., The Belknap Press of Harvard University Press, 1975
- worldcat.org Accessed August 27, 2007
- Lewis, Martin W. (February 2011). "Ellen Churchill Semple and Paths Not Taken". GeoCurrents. Accessed 2015-03-12.
