= List of geographers =

This list of geographers is presented in English alphabetical transliteration order (by surnames).

== A ==
- Hardo Aasmäe (Estonia, 1951–2014)
- Aziz Ab'Saber (Brazil, 1924–2012)
- Diogo Abreu (Portugal, born 1947)
- John Adams, (England, pre–1670–1738)
- Peter Adams (Canada, 1936–2018)
- Agatharchides (Ancient Greece, 2nd c. BCE)
- Agathedaemon of Alexandria (Ancient Greece, 2nd c. CE)
- John A. Agnew (England/US, born 1949)
- Irasema Alcántara-Ayala (Mexico, born 1970)
- T. Alford-Smith (US/England, 1864–1936)
- Margaret Swainson Anderson (England) (1902–1952)
- Richard Andree (Germany, 1835–1912)
- A. W. Andrews (England, 1868–1959)
- Ash Amin (England, born 1955)
- Alypius of Antioch (Roman Empire, fl. c. 450)
- Jacques Ancel (France, 1879–1943)
- Karl Andree (Germany, 1808–1875)
- Benoît Antheaume (France, born 1946)
- Pilar Benejam Arguimbau (Spain, born 1937)
- Aaron Arrowsmith (England, 1750–1823)
- Väinö Auer (Finland, 1895–1981)
- Félix de Azara (Spain, 1742–1821)

== B ==
- Zonia Baber (US, 1862–1956)
- Karl Ernst von Baer (Russia, 1792–1876)
- Robert Bailey (US, born 1939)
- Thomas Bailey (England, 1785–1856)
- Oliver Edwin Baker (US, 1883–1949)
- Abu Abdullah al-Bakri (Al-Andalus, 1014–1094)
- Adriano Balbi (Italy, 1782–1848)
- Ahmed ibn Sahl al-Balkhi (Persia, 850–934)
- Robert Balling (US, born 1952)
- Yvette Barbaza (1914–2009), French geographer
- Alexandre Barbié du Bocage (France, 1798–1835)
- John Barrow (England, fl. 1735–1774)
- Harlan H. Barrows (US, 1877–1960)
- Mark Bassin (US, living)
- Keith Barber (England, 1944–2017)
- John George Bartholomew (Scotland, 1860–1920)
- Ibn Battuta (Morocco, 1304–1369)
- Oscar Baumann (Austria, 1864–1899)
- Jacqueline Beaujeu-Garnier (France, 1917–1995)
- Anthony Bebbington (US, born 1962)
- Battista Beccario (Italy, 15th c.)
- Bertha Becker (Brazil, 1930–2013)
- Frederick William Beechey (England, 1796–1856)
- Walter Behrmann (Germany, 1882–1955)
- Charles Tilstone Beke (England, 1800–1874)
- Elena Berezovich (Russia, born 1966)
- Lev Semenovich Berg (Russia/Soviet Union, 1876–1950)
- Heinrich Berghaus (Germany, 1797–1884)
- Luiza Bialasiewicz (Poland/Netherlands, born 1971)
- Abū Rayhān Bīrūnī (Persia, 973–1048)
- Joan Blaeu (Netherlands, 1596–1673)
- Harm de Blij (US, 1935–2014)
- Franz Boas (Germany/US, 1858–1942
- Roland Bonaparte (France, 1858–1924)
- John Bowack (England, fl. 1737)
- E. G. Bowen (Wales, 1900–1983)
- Isaiah Bowman (Canada/US, 1878–1950)
- Edward William Brayley (England, 1801–1870)
- Harold Brookfield (England/Australia, born 1926)
- John Brown (England, 1797–1861)
- Conrad Malte-Brun (Denmark/France, 1775–1826)
- Sylvie Brunel (France, born 1960)
- Manola Brunet (Spain, born 1955)
- Jean Brunhes (France, 1869–1930)
- Harriet Bulkeley (England, born 1972)
- William Bunge (US/Canada, 1928–2013)
- Cristoforo Buondelmonti (Italy, 1386 – c. 1430)
- Philip Burden (US, living)
- Richard Francis Burton (England, 1821–1890)
- Anne Buttimer (Ireland, 1938–2017)

== C ==
- Anna Cabré (Spain, born 1943)
- Rafael Torres Campos (Spain, 1853–1904)
- Giovanni da Carignano (Italy, c. 1250–1329)
- Ana Fani Alessandri Carlos (Brazil, living)
- Nathanael Carpenter (England, 1589 – c. 1628)
- Manuel Castells (Spain, born 1942)
- Emanuela Casti (Italy, born 1950)
- Richard Cathcart (US, born 1943)
- Nicolay de Caveri (Italy, fl. 15th–16th cc.)
- Andreas Cellarius (Germany/Netherlands, c. 1596–1665)
- Samuel de Champlain (France/Canada, 1567–1635)
- Sylvia Chant (England, 1960–2019)
- Chen Cheng-Siang Chen (China, 1922–2003)
- Elena Chiozza (Argentina, 1919–2011)
- George Chisholm (Scotland, 1850–1930)
- Richard Chorley (England, 1927–2002)
- Walter Christaller (Germany, 1893–1969)
- Georgius Chrysococca (Greece/Persia, fl. 1340s)
- Václav Cílek (Czech Republic, born 1955)
- Claudius Clavus (Claudus Claussøn Swart, Denmark, born 1388)
- Philipp Clüver (Poland/Netherlands, 1580–1622)
- Denis Cosgrove (England, 1948–2008)
- John Antony Cramer (England, 1793–1848)
- Abraham Cresques (Spain, 1325–1387)
- George Cressey (US, 1896–1963)
- James Croll (Scotland, 1821–1890)
- Mike Crang (England, living)
- Vital Cuinet (France/Turkey, 1833–1896)
- Janel Curry (US, living)
- Sarah Curtis (England, living)
- Susan Cutter (US, born 1950)
- Jovan Cvijić (Serbia, 1865–1927)

== D ==
- Patricia Daley (Jamaica, living)
- Alexander Dalrymple (Scotland, 1737–1808)
- Jack Dangermond (US, born 1945)
- Amanda Davies (Australia, living)
- William Morris Davis (US, 1850–1934)
- Frank Debenham (Australia/England, 1883–1965)
- John Dee (England, 1527–1608)
- Ruth DeFries (US, born 1957)
- Paul Vidal de la Blache (France, 1845–1918)
- Félix Delamarche (France, fl. 18th–19th cc.)
- Michael N. DeMers (US, born 1951)
- Jared Diamond (US, born 1937)
- Dicaearchus (Greece, c. 350–28 BCE)
- Peter Dicken (England, born 1938)
- Frans Dieleman (Netherlands, 1942–2005)
- Al-Dimashqi (Syria, 1256–1327)
- Abu Hanifa Dinawari (Iran, 828–896)
- Vasily V. Dokuchaev (Russian Empire, 1846–1903)
- William E. Doolittle (US, born 1947)
- Mona Domosh (US, born 1957)
- Veronica Della Dora (Italy, born 1976)
- Angelino Dulcert (Italy/Spain, 14th c.)
- John Dunkin (England, 1782–1846)
- G. H. Dury (England, 1916–1996)

== E ==
- William Gordon East (England, 1902–1998)
- Sally Eden (England, 1967–2016)
- Marthe Emmanuel (France, 1901–1997)
- Gerd Enequist (Sweden, 1903–1989)
- Eratosthenes (Greece, 276–194 BCE)
- Lewis Evans (Wales/British American colonies, c. 1700–1756)
- George Everest (England, 1790–1866)

== F ==
- Ahmad ibn Fadlan (Iraq, 10th c.)
- Eileen Fairbairn (New Zealand, 1893–1981)
- Ghazi Falah (Canada, living)
- Abraham Farissol (Italy, c. 1451–1525 or 1526)
- Ibn al-Faqih (Persia, 10th c.)
- Filippo Ferrari (Italy, 1551–1626)
- Franco F. Ferrario (Italy, born 1934)
- Carlos Ferrás Sexto (Iran, fl. 902)
- Abu'l-Fida (Abulfeda) (Syria, 1273–1331)
- Louise Filion (Canada, born 1945)
- Ruth Fincher (Australia, born 1951)
- Alexander George Findlay (England, 1812–1875)
- Irene Fischer (Austria, US, 1907–2009)
- W. B. Fisher (United Kingdom, 1916–1984)
- Regina Fleszarowa (Poland, 1888–1969)
- Georges Fournier (France, 1595–1652)
- Janet Franklin (US, born 1959)
- J. Keith Fraser (Canada, born 1922)
- Gemma Frisius (Netherlands, 1508–1555)
- Lynne Frostick (England, born 1949)
- Masahisa Fujita (Japan, born 1943)

== G ==
- Alfons Gabriel (Austria, 1894–1976)
- Fay Gale (Australia, 1932–2008)
- Johann Georg August Galletti (Germany, 1750–1828)
- Paul Gallez (Argentina, 1920–2007)
- Francis Galton (England, 1822–1911)
- Henry Gannett (US, 1846–1914)
- Abu Sa'id Gardezi (Iran, died 1061)
- Rita Gardner (England, born 1955)
- Alice Garnett (England, 1903–1989)
- William Garrison (US, 1924–2015)
- Artur Gavazzi (Croatia/Slovenia, 1861–1944)
- Johann Gottlieb Georgi (Germany, 1729–1802)
- Nicolaus Germanus (Germany, c. 1420 – c. 1490)
- Gerald of Wales (Wales, fl. 1310–1330)
- Ruth Wilson Gilmore (US, born 1950)
- Gim Jeong-ho (Korea, 1804 – c. 1866)
- Giuseppe Maria Giulietti (Italy, 1847–1881)
- John Alan Glennon (US, born 1970)
- John of Głogów (Poland, c. 1445–1507)
- Johann Georg Gmelin (Germany, 1709–1755)
- Johann Friedrich Goldbeck (Germany, 1748–1812)
- Reginald G. Golledge (Australia/US, 1937–2009)
- Michael Frank Goodchild (Canada/US, born 1944)
- Jean Gottman (France, 1915–1994)
- Peter Gould (US, 1932–2000)
- Derek Gregory (England/Canada, born 1951)
- Jean Grove (England, 1927–2001)
- Gu Yanwu (China, 1613–1682)
- Lev Gumilev (Russia/Soviet Union, 1912–1992)
- Arnold Henry Guyot (Switzerland/US, 1807–1884)

== H ==
- Mohammad Reza Hafeznia (Iran, born 1955)
- Toni Hagen (Switzerland, 1917–2003)
- Torsten Hägerstrand (Sweden, 1916–2004)
- Peter Haggett (England, born 1933)
- Yaqut al-Hamawi (Near East, 1179–1229)
- Hamdani (Near East, 893–945)
- Susan Hanson (US, born 1943)
- John Brian Harley (England, 1932–1991)
- Cole Harris (Canada, born 1936)
- Richard Hartshorne (US, 1899–1992)
- David Harvey (US/Britain, born 1935)
- Margaret Hasluck (Scotland, 1885–1948)
- Henri Hauser (France, 1866–1946)
- Karl Haushofer (Germany, 1869–1946)
- Harriet Hawkins (England, born 1980)
- Ibn Hawqal (Near East, died after 977)
- Iain Hay (New Zealand/Australia, living)
- Ibn al-Haytham (Alhazen) (Iraq, 965–1039)
- Zheng He (China, 1371–1433 or 1435)
- Lesley Head (Australia, living)
- John Heap (England, 1932–2006)
- Sven Hedin (Sweden, 1865–1952)
- Karl Helbig (Germany, 1903–1991)
- Gamal Hemdan (Egypt, 1928–1993)
- Andrew John Herbertson (Scotland, 1865–1915)
- Robert Heron (Scotland, 1764–1807)
- Alfred Hettner (Germany, 1859–1941)
- Hipparchus (Greece, 190–120 BCE)
- Filip Hjulström (Sweden, 1092–1982)
- Jacoba Hol (Netherlands, 1886–1964)
- Thomas Holdich (England, 1843–1929)
- John Holmes (Australia, living)
- Johann Homann (Germany, 1664–1724)
- Sally P. Horn (US, living)
- J. F. Horrabin (England, 1886–1942)
- Robert E. Horton (US, 1875–1945)
- Carl Humann (Germany, 1839–1896)
- Alexander von Humboldt (Germany, 1769–1859)
- Ellsworth Huntington (US, 1876–1947)
- Thomas Hutchins (US, 1730–1789)

== I ==
- Muhammad al-Idrisi (Dreses) (Islamic Spain, 1100–1166)
- Cosmas Indicopleustes (Greece, 6th c. CE)
- Anastas Ishirkov (Bulgaria, 1868–1937)

== J ==
- Jane Jacobs (US/Canada, 1916–2006)
- Jane M. Jacobs (Australia, born 1958)
- Preston E. James (United States, 1899–1986)
- Mariel Jean-Brunhes Delamarre (France, 1905–2001)
- Thomas Jefferys (England, c. 1719–1771)
- Alexander Keith Johnston (Scotland, 1804–1871)
- Alexander Keith Johnston (Scotland, 1844–1879)
- Ron J. Johnston (England, 1941–2020)
- Gareth Jones (England, living)
- Kelvyn Jones (Wales/England, born 1953)
- Reece Jones (US, born 1976)
- Ibn Jubayr (Taifa of Valencia/Arabia, 1145–1217)

== K ==
- Felix Philipp Kanitz (Austria-Hungary, 1829–1904)
- Mahmud al-Kashgari (Kara-Khanid Khanate, 1005–1102)
- Robert Kates (US, 1929–2018)
- Cindi Katz (US, born 1954)
- Ibn Khordadbeh (Persia, c. 820–912)
- Muhammad ibn Mūsā al-Khwārizmī (Persia, 780–850)
- Heinrich Kiepert (Germany, 1818–1899)
- Richard Kiepert (Germany, 1846–1915)
- Al-Kindi (Alkindus, Abbasid Caliphate, 801–873)
- Cuchlaine King (England, 1922–2019)
- Caroline King-Okumu (Kenya, living)
- Fred B. Kniffen (US, 1900–1993)
- Peter Knight (England, born 1947)
- Anne Kelly Knowles (US, born 1957)
- Janelle Knox-Hayes (US, living)
- Audrey Kobayashi (Canada, born 1951)
- Grigorios Konstantas (Greece, 1753–1844)
- Peter Kosler (Carniola, 1824–1879)
- Blasius Kozenn (Carniola, 1821–1871)
- Stepan Krasheninnikov (Russia, 1711–1755)
- Peter Kropotkin (Russia, 1842–1921)

== L ==
- Yves Lacoste (France, born 1929)
- Joannes de Laet (Netherlands, 1581–1649) in Dutch and Latin
- William Lambton (England, c. 1753–1823)
- Marcia Langton (Australia, born 1951)
- Wendy Larner (New Zealand, living)
- Eugenie Lautensach-Löffler (Germany, 1902–1987)
- Vanessa Lawrence (England, born 1962)
- Giovanni Leardo (Italy, 15th c.)
- Philippe Le Billon (Canada, living)
- Jean Le Clerc (France, c. 1560–1621/1624)
- Peirce F. Lewis (US, 1927–2018)
- Elisabeth Lichtenberger (Austria, 1925–2017)
- Diana Liverman (England, born 1954)
- Liu An (China, 177–122 BCE)
- David Livingstone (Scotland/East Africa, 1813–1873)
- Rita López de Llergo y Seoane (Mexico, 1905–1979)
- Fyodor Luzhin (Russia, died 1727)

== M ==
- Halford John Mackinder (UK, 1861–1947)
- Ibn Sa'id al-Maghribi (Arabia, 1213–1286)
- Ahmad ibn Mājid (Arabia, born 1432)
- Conrad Malte-Brun (Denmark/France, 1775–1826)
- Victor Adolphe Malte-Brun (France, 1816–1889)
- Luigi Ferdinando Marsili (Italy, 1658–1730)
- Kenneth Mason (England, 1887–1976)
- Doreen Massey (England, 1944–2016)
- Abu al-Hasan (Arabia, 896–956)
- Otto Maull (Austria/Germany, 1887–1957)
- Linda McDowell (England, born 1949)
- Katherine McKittrick (Canada, living)
- Megasthenes (Greece, c. 350 – c. 290 BCE)
- Simion Mehedinți (Romania, 1868–1962)
- Karl Eduard Meinicke (Germany, 1803–1876)
- D. W. Meinig (US, born 1928)
- August Meitzen (Germany 1822–1910)
- Anton Melik (Slovenia, 1890–1966)
- Josefina Gómez Mendoza (Spain, born 1942)
- Daniel Gottlieb Messerschmidt (Germany/Russia, 1685–1735)
- Alfred Merz (US, born 1924)
- Nick Middleton (England, born 1960)
- Don Mitchell (US, born 1961)
- Henry Mitchell (US, 1830–1902)
- Katharyne Mitchell (US, born 1961)
- Aleksandra Monedzhikova, (Bulgaria, 1889–1959)
- Janice Monk (Australia, born 1937)
- Mark Monmonier (US, born 1943)
- Elina González Acha de Correa Morales (Spain, 1861–1942)
- Jedidiah Morse (US, 1761–1826)
- Michael Mortimore (England, 1937–2017)
- William G. Moseley (US, born 1965)
- Al-Muqaddasi (Jerusalem/Fatimid Caliphate, c. 945–1000)
- Hamdallah Mustawfi (Persia, 1281–1349)

== N ==
- Richa Nagar (India, born 1968)
- Catherine Nash (England, living)
- Christophe Neff (Germany/France, born 1964)
- Marion Newbigin (Scotland, 1869–1934)
- Linda Newson (England, living)
- Joseph Nicollet (France, 1786–1843)
- Ng Cho-nam (Hong Kong, 1960–2019)
- Ljubinka Nikolić (Yugoslavia/Serbia, born 1964)
- Salme Nõmmik (Estonia, 1910–1988)
- Pedro Nunes (Portugal, 1502–1578)

== O ==
- Erich Obst (Germany, 1886–1981)
- Vladimir Obruchev (Russia/Soviet Union, 1863–1956)
- Patrick O'Flanagan (Ireland, born 1947)
- Miles Ogborn (England, living)
- Kenneth Olwig (US, born 1946)
- Gearóid Ó Tuathail (Ireland, born 1962)
- Susan Owens (England, born 1954)

== P ==
- Diego de Pantoja (Spain/Macau, 1571–1618)
- Xoán Paredes (Spain/Ireland, born 1975)
- Joseph Partsch (Germany, 1851–1925)
- Martin J. Pasqualetti (US, living)
- Patrick Geddes (Scotland, 1854–1932)
- Pausanias (Greece, fl. c. 150)
- Ceri Peach (Wales, 1939–2018)
- Albrecht Penck (Germany, 1858–1945)
- Walther Penck (Germany, 1888–1923)
- Jocelyne Pérard (France, born 1940)
- Nikolai Petrusevich (Russia, 1838–1880)
- Daniel Philippidis (Greece, c. 1750–1832)
- Chris Philo (England/Scotland, born 1960)
- Domenico and Francesco Pizzigano (Italy, 14th c.)
- Marco Polo (Italy, 1254–1324)
- Posidonius (Greece, 135–51 BCE)
- Alice Poulleau (France, 1885–1960)
- Allan Pred (US, 1936–2007)
- John Robert Victor Prescott (England/Australia, 1931–2018)
- Nikolai Przhevalsky (Russia, 1839–1888)
- Pseudo-Scymnus (Greece, c. 100 BCE)
- Ptolemy (Roman Egypt, c. 85–165)
- Denise Pumain (France, born 1946)
- Pytheas (Greece, fl. c. 360 BCE)

== Q ==
- Qudama ibn Ja'far (Syria, c. 873 – c. 932/948)

== R ==
- Sarah A. Radcliffe (England, living)
- Friedrich Ratzel (Germany, 1844–1904)
- Amin Razi (Persia, 16th century)
- Élisée Reclus (France, 1830–1905)
- Judith Rees (England, born 1944)
- Edward Ayearst Reeves (Britain, 1862–1945)
- Piri Reis (Turkey, 1465–1554)
- James Rennell (England, 1742–1830)
- Ebenezer Rhodes (England, 1762–1839)
- Orlando Ribeiro (Portugal, 1911–1997)
- Ferdinand Baron Von Richthofen (19th century)
- Tristram Risdon (England, c. 1580–1640)
- Carl Ritter (Germany, 1779–1859)
- Arthur H. Robinson (US, 1915–2004)
- Edward Robinson (US, 1894–1963)
- Jean Baptiste Gaspard Roux de Rochelle (France, 1762–1849)
- Joseph Rock (Austria/US, 1884–1962)
- Friedrich Gerhard Rohlfs (Germany, 1831–1896)
- Bernard Romans (Netherlands, 1741–1784)
- Albrecht Roscher (Germany, 1836–1860)
- Gillian Rose (England, born 1962)
- Thomas E. Ross (US, born 1942)
- William Roy (Scotland, 1726–1790)
- Ibn Rushd (Averroes, 1126–1198)
- Ibn Rustah (Persia, died 903 CE)

== S ==
- David Sadler (England, born 1960)
- Louis Vivien de Saint-Martin (France, 1802–1896)
- Luis García Sáinz (Spain, 1894–1965)
- Milton Santos (Brazil, 1926–2001)
- Saskia Sassen (US, born 1947)
- Carl Sauer (US, 1889–1975)
- Fred K. Schaefer (Germany/US, 1904–1953)
- Henry Schoolcraft (US, 1793–1864)
- Leopold von Schrenck (Russia, 1826–1894)
- Peter Carl Ludwig Schwarz (Germany/Russia, 1822–1894)
- Allen J. Scott (US, born 1938)
- Scymnus of Chios (Greece, fl. c. 185 BCE)
- Pyotr Semenov-Tyan-Shansky (Russia, 1827–1914)
- Ellen Churchill Semple (US, 1863–1932)
- Karen Seto (US, living)
- Edward Shackleton, Baron Shackleton (England, 1911–1994)
- Shen Kuo (沈括, China, 1031–1095)
- Yuly Shokalsky (Russia/Soviet Union, 1856–1940)
- Kirsten Simonsen (Denmark, born 1946)
- Ibn Sina (Persia, 980–1037)
- Paul Allen Siple (US, 1908–1968)
- Andrew Sluyter (US, born 1958)
- Barry Smit (Canada, born 1948)
- George Smith (Scotland, 1833–1919)
- Neil Smith (Scotland/US, 1954–2012)
- Richard G. Smith (England/Wales, living)
- Susan J. Smith (England, born 1956)
- Edward Soja (US, 1940–2015)
- Pavle Solarić (Slavonia, 1779–1821)
- Guillem Soler (Spain, fl. 1380s)
- Su Song (蘇頌, China, 1020–1101)
- Nikolai Spathari (Moldavia/Russia, 1636–1708)
- Oskar Spate (England/Australia, 1911–2000)
- John Hanning Speke (England, 1827–1864)
- Alison Stenning (England, living)
- Evelyn Stokes (New Zealand, 1936–2005)
- Strabo (Roman Empire, Greece, c. 63/64 – c. 24 BCE)

== T ==
- Andres Tarand (Estonia, born 1940)
- Pierre Tardi (France, 1897–1972)
- Ralph Stockman Tarr (US, 1864–1912)
- Eva Germaine Rimington Taylor (England, 1879–1966)
- Peter J. Taylor (England, born 1944)
- Nigel Thrift (England, born 1949)
- Johann Heinrich von Thünen (Germany, 1783–1850)
- Joy Tivy (Ireland/Scotland, 1924–1995)
- Waldo R. Tobler (US, 1930–2018)
- Wilhelm Tomaschek (Austrian Empire, 1841–1901)
- Roger Tomlinson (England, 1933–2014)
- George Trebeck (England/India, 1800–1825)
- Emil Trinkler (Germany, 1896–1931)
- Carl Troll (Germany, 1899–1975)
- Aadel Brun Tschudi (Norway, 1909–1980)
- Yi-Fu Tuan (段義孚, US/China, born 1930)
- Billie Lee Turner II (US, born 1945)
- Marinos of Tyre (Greece, c. 70–130 CE)

== U ==
- Edward Ullman (US, 1912–1976)

== V ==
- Vakhushti of Kartli (Georgia, 1696–1757)
- Gill Valentine (England, living)
- Anastasia van Burkalow (American, 1911–2004)
- Didier Robert de Vaugondy (France, 1723–1786)
- Pietro Vesconte (Italy, fl. 1310–1330)
- José Antonio Villaseñor y Sánchez (Mexico, fl. 1740s)
- Albertinus de Virga (Italy, 15th c.)

== W ==
- Alfred Russel Wallace (England, 1823–1913)
- Margaret Walton-Roberts (Canada, 1968–2025)
- Ibn al-Wardi (Arabia, died 1457)
- Michael Watts (England, born 1951)
- Bradford Washburn (US, 1910–2007)
- Alfred Weber (Germany, 1868–1958)
- Alfred Lothar Wegener (Germany, 1911–2006)
- Johannes Werner (Germany, 1468–1522)
- Sarah Whatmore (England, born 1959)
- Gilbert F. White (US, 1911–2006)
- Emma Willard (US, 1787–1870)
- John Francon Williams FRGS (Wales, 1854–1911)
- Alan Wilson (England, born 1939)
- Charles W. J. Withers (Scotland, born 1954)
- Jennifer Wolch (US, living)
- Denis Wood (US, born 1945)
- David Woodward (US, 1942–2004)
- Fanny Bullock Workman (US, 1859–1925))
- Dawn Wright (US, born 1961)
- John Kirtland Wright (US, 1891–1969)

== X ==
- Xu Xiake (徐霞客, China, 1587–1641)

== Y ==
- Naomasa Yamasaki (山崎 直方, Japan, 1870–1929)
- Ya'qubi (Abbasid Caliphate, died 897)

== Z ==
- Wilbur Zelinsky (US, born 1921)
- Jacob Ziegler (Germany, 1470/1471–1549)
- Eberhard August Wilhelm von Zimmermann (Germany, 1743–1815)
- Karl Bernhard Zoeppritz (Germany, 1881–1908)

== See also ==
- List of cartographers
- List of Graeco-Roman geographers
- List of Muslim geographers
- Russian geographers
