= Ana Fani Alessandri Carlos =

Brazilian geographer (born 1952)

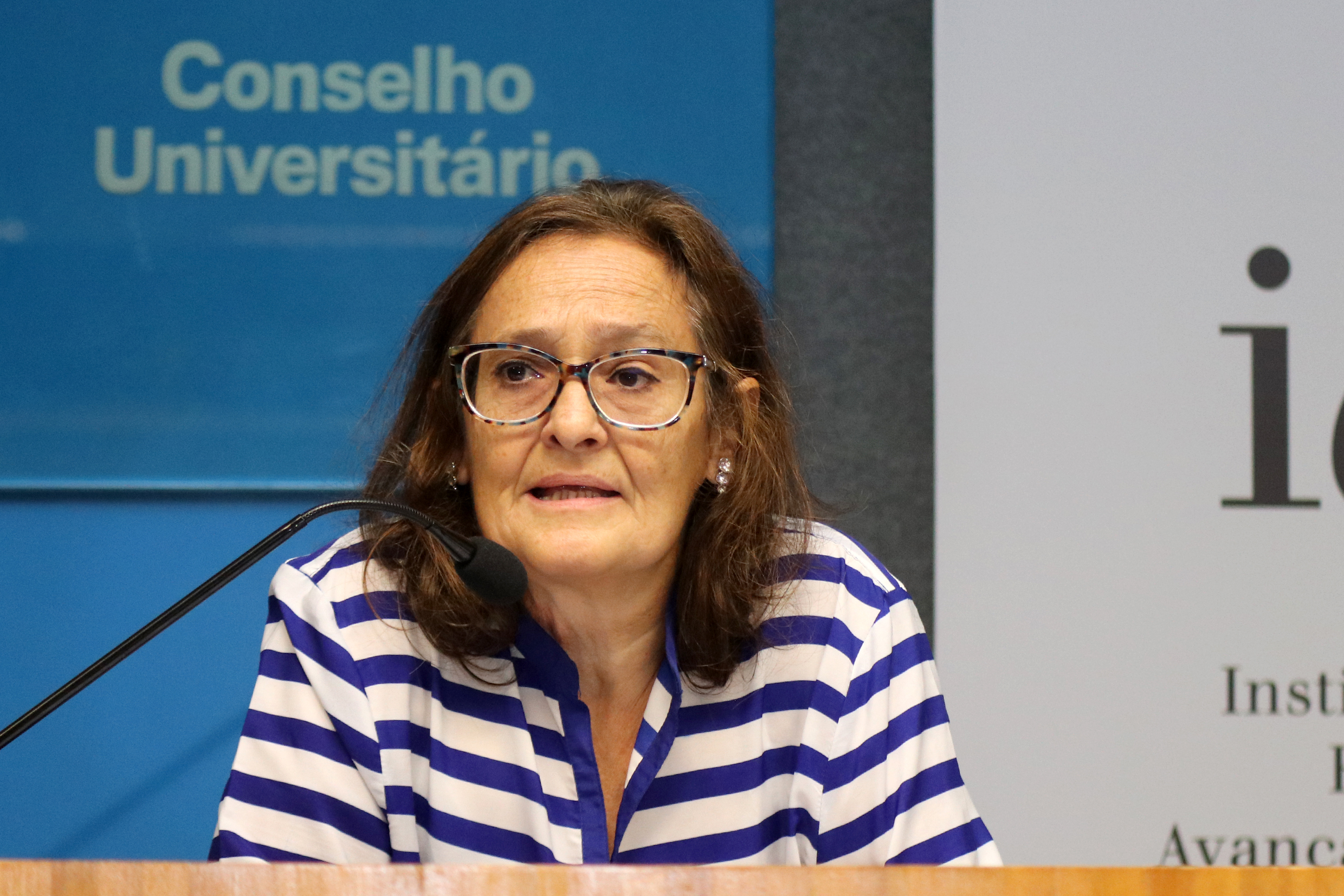
In 2018, making a presentation at the University of São Paulo.

Ana Fani Alessandri Carlos (born May 22, 1952) is a Brazilian geographer. She is a full professor in the Department of Geography at the University of São Paulo and coordinator of the São Paulo Study Group. Carlos focuses her research on the São Paulo metropolitan area and the spatial transformations which resulted from the area's development.

== Biography ==
Ana Fani was born in São Paulo, Brazil, in 1952, into an Italian family in the Barra Funda neighborhood. She enrolled in the Geography course at the University of São Paulo in 1971, where she graduated in 1975. She completed her master's degree in 1978, and her doctorate in 1987, under the guidance of Professor Léa Goldenstein.

She completed postdoctoral studies at the University of Paris VII (1989) and at the University of Paris 1 Pantheon-Sorbonne (1996), defending her habilitation in the Department of Geography at the University of São Paulo in 2000, with her thesis titled: Space-time in the daily life of the metropolis.

In addition to her professorship at the University of São Paulo, she also coordinates work at the São Paulo Studies Group. Her research is almost exclusively dedicated to the São Paulo metropolis and the spatial transformations resulting from the development of the capital. More recently, she has focused on the construction of metageography.

== Selected published books (in Portuguese) ==
- Espaço e indústria. São Paulo: Editora Contexto/Edusp, 1ª edição 1992, 4a edição 1992., 5 edição 1995, 7ª edição 1997, 70 p.
- Os Caminhos da Reflexão Sobre a Cidade e o Urbano. Edusp, 1994, 391 p.
- A cidade, São Paulo: Editora Contexto, 1ª edição 1991, 2ª edição 1995. (Coleção Repensando a Geografia), 98 p.
- A (re)produção do espaço urbano. São Paulo: Editora da Universidade de São Paulo, 1994, 270 p.
- O lugar no/do mundo. São Paulo: Hucitec, 1996, 150 p. segunda edição no prelo
- Espaço - tempo na metrópole Editora Contexto, São Paulo, 2001 368 páginas.
- Geografias de São Paulo. Editora Contexto Ana Fani Alessandri Carlos e Ariovaldo Umbelino de Oliveira, 2004, 828 p
