= Gareth Jones (geographer) =

- Scientific career
- Fields: Urban geography

Gareth Jones is a professor of urban geography in the Department of Geography and Environment at the London School of Economics (LSE), and an Associate Fellow at the Institute for the Study of the Americas in the School of Advanced Study at the University of London.

Jones is a joint editor of the Journal of Latin American Studies, a member of The British Academy Area Studies Panel for Latin America and the Caribbean, and an invited member of the Advisory Committee of the Centre of Excellence for Statistics on Governance, Public Security and Justice, at the UN Office on Drugs and Crime (Mexico).

Jones has edited and authored of a number of books, as well as many academic articles. His most recent book as editor (2009) is Youth Violence in Latin America: Gangs and Juvenile Justice in Perspective (edited with D. Rodgers). His most recent co-authored book (2010) is Bringing Youth into Development. He also has an advance contract with Temple University Press for a book tentatively titled Street Corners in a Global World: Everyday Life and Identities of Mexican Street Youth.

His research interests are urban geography, international development, youth, gated communities, gentrification, and identity. He has conducted research in Mexico, Colombia, Ecuador, Brazil, Ghana, and South Africa.

== See also ==
- Geography
- Human geography
- List of geographers
