= Manola Brunet =

Spanish geographer and climatologist (born 1955)

Manola Brunet (born 1955) (sometimes listed as Manola Brunet India) is a Spanish geographer and climatologist. In 2018, the World Meteorological Organization (WMO) named her president of the United Nations International Commission on Climatology, making her the first woman and the first Spaniard to head the group in its history. The WMO is one of eight United Nations agencies charged with researching weather, climate and water.

== Biography ==
Brunet was born in Cariñena and studied at the University of Barcelona, earning a PhD in Geography and History. Beginning in 1982, she served as a professor at the University's Tarragona campus. In 1995, she was made co-director of the Climate Change Research Group (GRCC) at the Rovira i Virgili University (URV). In 2003, Brunet became the group's director. In 2005, she was appointed co-chair of the group dedicated to climate monitoring and analysis, a position she continues to hold.

In 2008, at the Terres de l'Ebre Campus in Catalonia, URV created its own Climate Change Center and announced that Brunet would be its first director.

Since April 2018, Brunet has led the World Meteorological Organization's (WMO) Commission for Climatology for the United Nations. When asked about the consequences of climate change, she says, "More heat and more erratic rainfall are leading us to more arid climates. All climate subtypes in the [Iberian] region appear to be moving toward aridification, with more heat and less available water. We are facing a climate that is negatively impacting our water resources, one of the worst scourges of climate change, along with rising sea levels (which we are also experiencing)."

Brunet continues her work as a climatology professor in the Rovira i Virgili University's Department of Geography, and is director of the URV Climate Change Center. In addition to her work at URV and with the United Nations, she is a visiting professor at the Climatic Research Unit at the University of East Anglia, in Norwich, United Kingdom.
