= Sylvie Brunel =

French economist and geographer

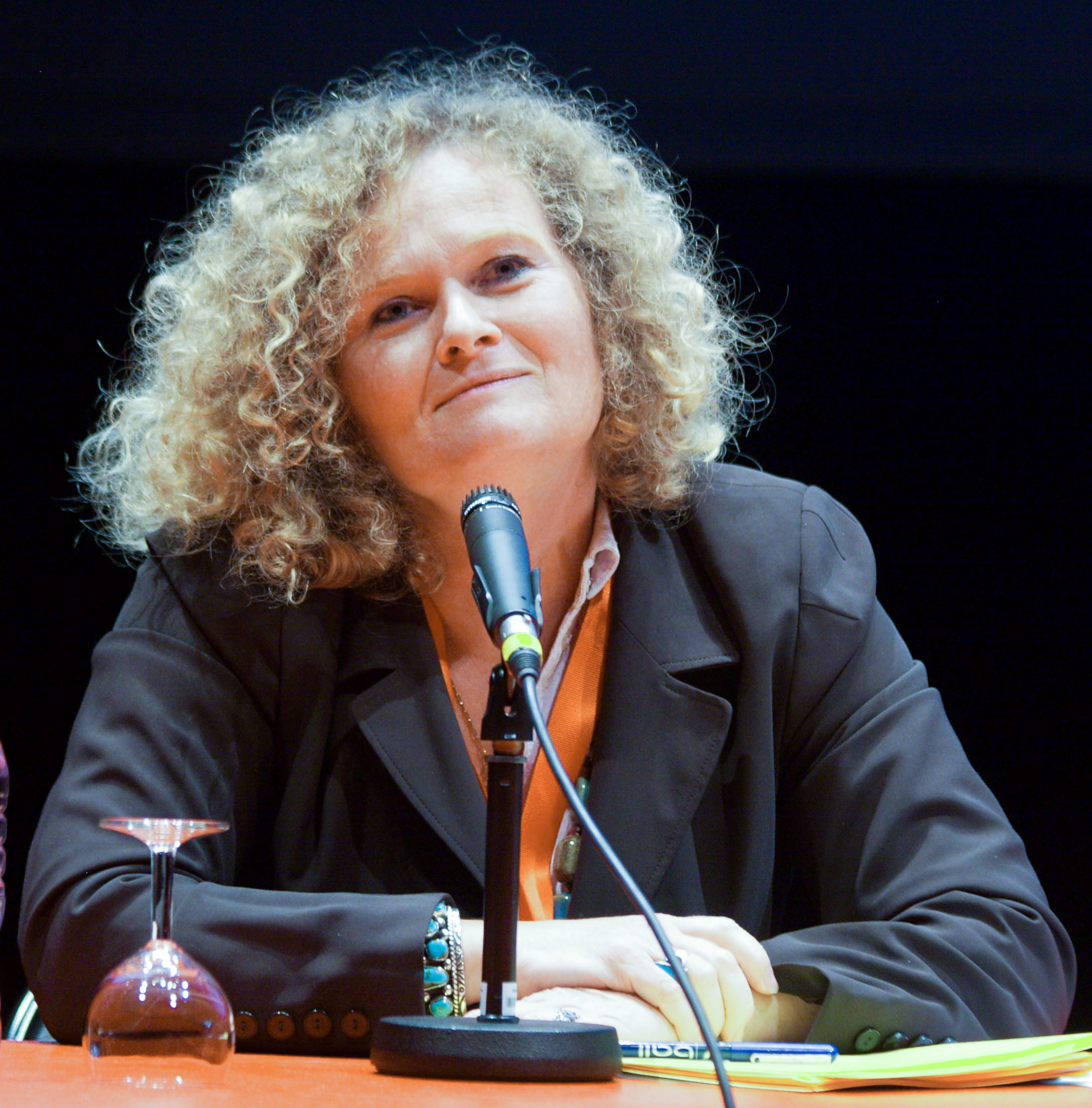

Sylvie Brunel (born 13 July 1960 in Douai) is a French economist and geographer, best known for her work for Action Against Hunger from 1989 to 2002, and her various publications in Que sais-je?. She was awarded the Legion of Honour in 2002.

== Books ==
=== Essays ===
- La vache du riche mange le grain… du riche, LSF, 1985.
- Asie, Afrique : grenier vides, greniers pleins, Economica, « Économie agricole », 1986.
- Le Nordeste brésilien, les véritables enjeux, LSF, 1986.
- Tiers Mondes. Controverses et réalités, Economica, 1987.
- Une Tragédie banalisée, la faim dans le monde, Hachette-Pluriel, 1991, Prix Pierre Chauleur from the Académie des sciences d'outre-mer
- Les Tiers Mondes, La Documentation photographique, No. 7014, La Documentation française, 1992.
- Le Gaspillage de l'aide publique, Seuil, 1993.
- Le Sud dans la nouvelle économie mondiale, PUF, 1995.
- Le Sous-développement, PUF, « Que sais-je ? », 1996.
- Ceux qui vont mourir de faim, Seuil, 1997.
- La Coopération Nord-Sud, PUF, « Que sais-je ? », 1997
- La Faim dans le monde. Comprendre pour agir, PUF, 1999. Obtention du prix Conrad Malte-Brun de la Société de Géographie en 2001
- Action contre la faim, sous la coord. de Sylvie Brunel : Géopolitique de la faim (2001) ISBN 2-13-050132-X.
- Famines et politique, Presses de Sciences Po, 2002 ISBN 2-7246-0873-9.
- Frontières (roman), Denoël, 2003 ISBN 2-207-25462-3.
- Le Développement durable, PUF, « Que sais-je ? », 2004; nouvelle édition 2009.
- L'Afrique. Un continent en réserve de développement, Éditions Bréal, 2004 ISBN 2-84291-866-5
  - prix Robert-Cornevin 2004 de l’Académie des sciences d’outre-mer.
- L'Afrique dans la mondialisation, La documentation photographique, No. 8048, La Documentation française, 2005.
- La Déliaison (roman), coécrit avec sa fille Ariane Fornia, Denoël, 2005.
- La Planète disneylandisée. Chroniques d'un tour du monde, Éditions Sciences humaines, 2006; nouvelle édition enrichie en 2012.
- À qui profite le développement durable, Larousse, 2008. Prix Luc Durand-Reville de l'Académie des sciences morales et politiques
- Nourrir le monde. Vaincre la faim, Larousse, 2009.
- Manuel de guérilla à l'usage des femmes, Grasset, 2009 (Essai en partie autobiographique)
- Géographie amoureuse du monde, Lattès, 2011.
- Géographie amoureuse du maïs, Lattès, 2012.
- L'Afrique est-elle si bien partie ?, Sciences Humaines, 2014. Obtention du grand prix du festival géopolitique de Grenoble en 2015
- Croquer la pomme, l'histoire du fruit qui a perdu le monde et qui le sauvera, Lattès, 2016.
- Plaidoyer pour nos agriculteurs. Il faudra demain nourrir le monde, Buchet/Chastel, 2017 ISBN 978-2-283-02961-9.
- Brunel, Sylvie (2019). "Toutes ces idées qui nous gâchent la vie : alimentation, climat, santé, progrès, écologie…" (in French). Paris. JC Lattès. ISBN 978-2-7096-6531-5..
- Pourquoi les paysans vont sauver le monde, Buchet-Chastel, 2020, rééd. poche Harper Collins, 2021.
- Manuel de guérison à l'usage des femmes, Albin Michel, 2021.

=== Novels ===
- Cavalcades et Dérobades (roman), éditions Jean-Claude Lattès, 2008.
  - prix Pégase de l’École nationale d'équitation 2009.
- Le Voyage à Timimoun, Lattès, 2010.
- Un escalier vers le paradis, Lattès, 2014.
- Crin Blanc ou l'invention de la Camargue (avec Florian Colomb de Daunant), Actes Sud, 2016.
- Le Bonheur à cheval (avec Alain Bellanger), Belin, 2017.
- Camargue, Crin-Blanc et ses légendes, Nevicata, coll. L'âme des peuples, 2019.
