= Yvette Barbaza =

French geographer (1914–2009)

- Born: Yvette Lucienne Marie Azéma; 29 March 1914; Cazouls-lès-Béziers
- Died: 26 August 2009; Villejuif

Yvette Barbaza (29 March 1914 – 26 August 2009), was a French geographer, professor of geography and researcher at the French National Centre for Scientific Research (CNRS). Yvette Barbaza devoted the later years of her career to the study of the Spanish Mediterranean coast called Costa Brava.

== Biography ==
Yvette Lucienne Marie Azéma was born on 29 March 1914 in Cazouls-lès-Béziers. She studied at the Béziers boarding school, at the École Normale, to become a teacher. She completed her higher education at the faculty of Montpellier (1934–1938) where she began to take an interest in geography. During the German occupation, Professor Jules Sion suggested that she study the Costa Brava. From then on, she explored her new passion: studying the beauty of the landscapes of the Catalan coasts of Empordà and Selva, Spain and the threats posed by the increase in tourists to the region.

In Montpellier, she met her future husband (René Henri Barbaza) who had degrees in literature and law, just as she did. They married in 1938, moved to Paris in 1948 and had three children: Anne, Pierre and Françoise. During this period, as an agrégée in geography, she was able to teach in several establishments: at the Saint-Germain-en-Laye Institute, at the Lycée Montaigne and then at the Lycée Victor Hugo.

=== Research ===
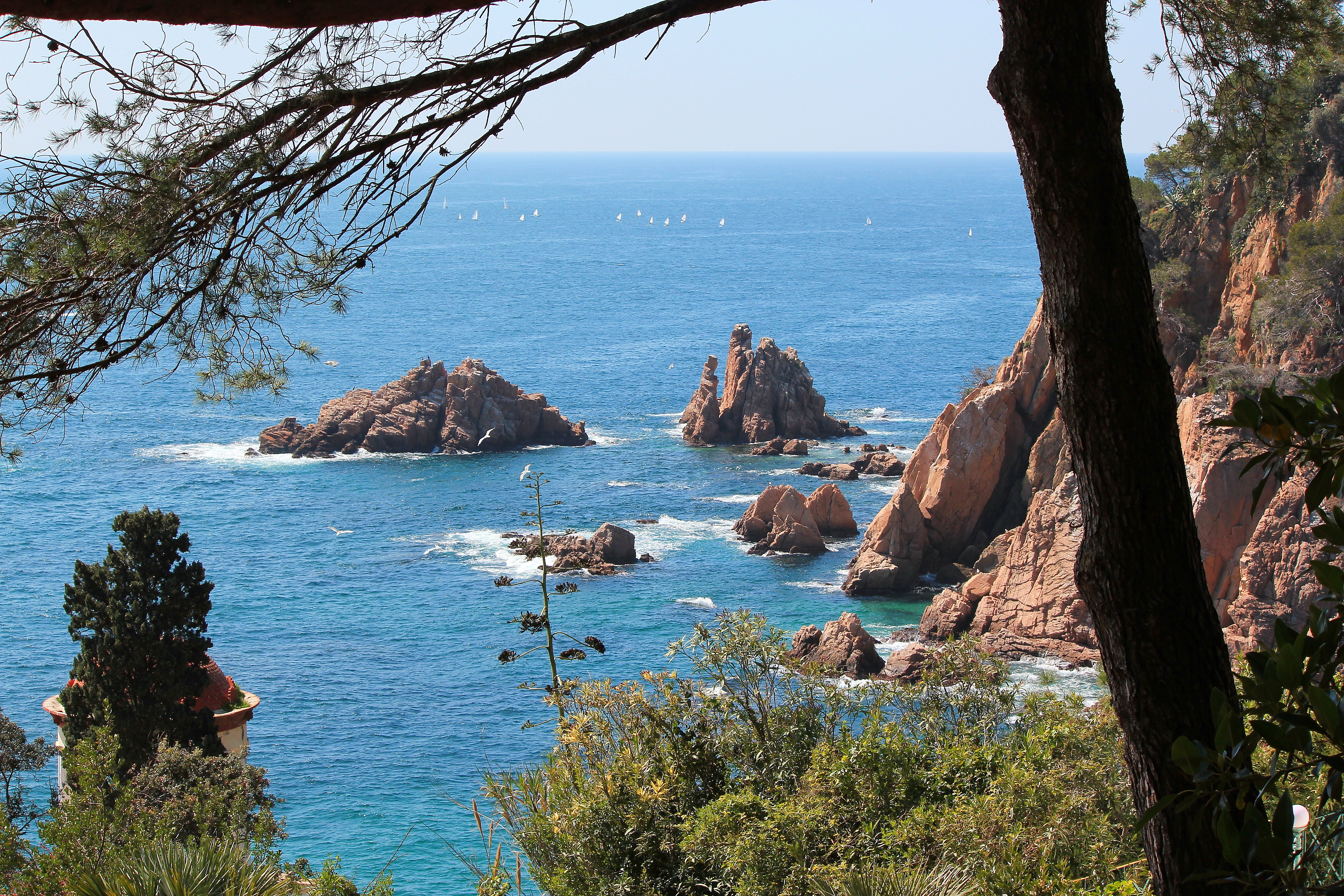
Costa Brava at Blanes

She did not begin her doctorate on the Costa Brava until 1956, under the supervision of Georges Chabot. With the help of her mother, who took care of the house and the children, she devoted herself to writing her 800-page dissertation, which was devoted to the study of the Spanish coast, from Portbou to Blanes. She travelled to the location of her study for the first time in 1956, then returned several times until 1974. It took her ten years to complete her thesis because she was also working to fulfill her responsibilities as a CNRS research officer.

In June 1966, she finally defended her thesis and, shortly thereafter, Librairie Armand Colin published it in French under the title Le paysage humain de la Costa Brava. The first part of her book, "The environment and the people" was devoted to the description of the three aspects of her subject. The first aspect discussed the Pyrenean sector made up of a rocky coast, the marshy Empordà sector, and the southern sector with sheltered bays. The second aspect, "The development of lifestyles and human landscapes" was organized chronologically, from ancient times to the present day. The third aspect "Lifestyles and human landscapes disrupted by tourism" returned to the development of tourism and industry, to the detriment of local crafts, fishing and agriculture, saying that the resulting crisis would cause a mass exodus to larger cities, especially Barcelona.

=== Professor ===
After obtaining her doctorate, she taught at the University of Lille and then at the University of Paris VII, in Vincennes.

In 1975, Barbaza went to the Ivory Coast in Africa to participate in the creation of the Institute of Tropical Geography at the University of Abidjan. Six years later, back in France, she worked at the University of Saint-Denis, until she retired in 1984.

After her retirement, she gave lectures, participated in seminars, and wrote articles. However, her most important project was the translation of her thesis into Catalan, which was published in 1988 by the publishing house Éditions 62. Joan Cals y Güell, professor of economics at the Autonomous University of Barcelona, wrote the preface to the Catalan language version of Barbaza's book.

Yvette Barbaza died on 26 August 2009 in Villejuif, France.
