= Luis García Sainz =

Spanish geographer

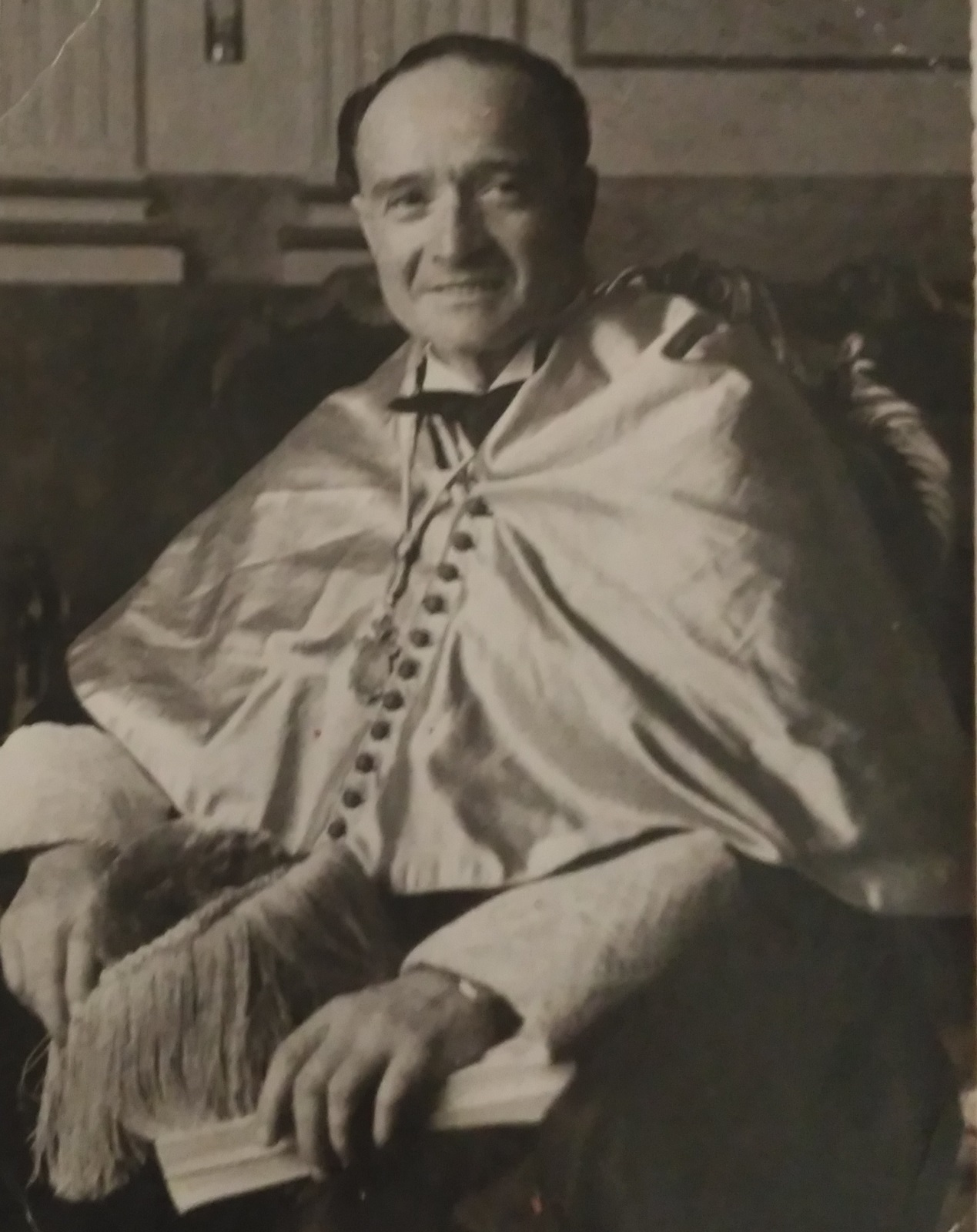
Luis García Sáinz

Luis García Sáinz (1894, in Saragossa – March 11, 1965 in Saragossa) was a pioneer of physical geography in Spain. He was the first professor of Geography en la University of Valencia and secretary at the Instituto Juan Sebastián Elcano. His final position was as a professor at the University of Barcelona.

== Teacher of geography ==
He began his academic career studying and practicing as a teacher in Teruel.

In 1917, he was appointed Teacher of Geography at the Ecole Normale of Palma de Mallorca, which he would later direct.

In 1924, he received a grant to study Geography in Switzerland, both comparative and didactic.

In 1925, he stayed at the University of Belgrade to study with Serbian geographer Jovan Cvijić the areas of evolution in surface and subsurface ice of the Alps, and the regions of the Rhine and central Germany.

He was secretary of Instituto Juan Sebastián Elcano of Consejo Superior de Investigaciones Científicas after the Spanish Civil War. This Institute had an important role in the development of Spanish geography study.

== Professor of geography ==
In 1941, he was appointed the first Professor of Physical Geography of the University of Valencia, and secretary on restart the [Instituto Juan Sebastián Elcano]. He belongs to the German School of Spanish Geographers. His last position was as a professor at the University of Barcelona.

In memoria there is a State School in Fuentes de Ebro, CEIP Luis García Sáinz.

== Physical geographer ==
He is part of the German School geographers group, influenced by German geographer's work in Spain and for their educational training in Germany. As geographers attest Horacio Capel in «Geography after the Spanish Civil War., and «Vicenç Maria Rosselló i Verger in «Spanish precursors of Physical Geography.

He was a pioneer in geomorphological research. His writings on the Ebro basin (1927, 1928, 1936 and 1939), areas of erosion, glaciers, storms from the east, the massif of Idubeda, and red soils of Mallorca were most notable.

== Death ==
Luis died in an accident while returning in his car from a court in Madrid on March 11, 1965.

Title	Year	Gender
Hydrographic-ground developments and phenomena in materials during Neogene in half Ebro river	1928	Article
An expedition to the sources of Esera	1931	Article
Glacial and preglacial morphology of the Noguera region	1935	Article
Major morphological features of the Aragonese Pyrenees during the Tertiary and Quaternary	1936	Article
Study-report of groundwater in Almonacid de la Sierra	1937	Article
Main morphological features of the middle Ebro river	1939	Article
Epiglaciares stages in Spanish Pyrenees	1940	Article
