= Jean Le Clerc (geographer) =

Jean Le Clerc (c.1560 - 1621 or 1624) was a French geographer, copperplate engraver, printer and publisher, mainly active in Paris. He was also known as Jean Le Clerc IV, Jean Le Clerc le fils, Jean Le Clerc le jeune (to distinguish him from his father Jean Le Clerc III), Joannes Le Clerc, Johannes Le Clerc, Johannes Clericus and Jean Leclerc. He was born into the French Wars of Religion, which only ended when he was thirty-eight, and as a Huguenot he fled Paris in 1588 and spent a year elsewhere in France. He gained royal concessions under kings Henri IV and Louis XIII and developed a huge publishing business, collaborating with several engravers and publishing maps, images of contemporary events and other works, including an atlas of France. His wife was Frémine Ricard or Richard.

== Life ==
He was baptised on 16 August 1560 in Paris, with the engraver François Desprez (1530–1587) and the painter Jérôme Bollery (1532–1592) as his godfathers. He came from a family of printers and publishers - Jean's younger brother David Le Clerc (1561–1613) and Jean's own son Jean Le Clerc V were both book printers and publishers.

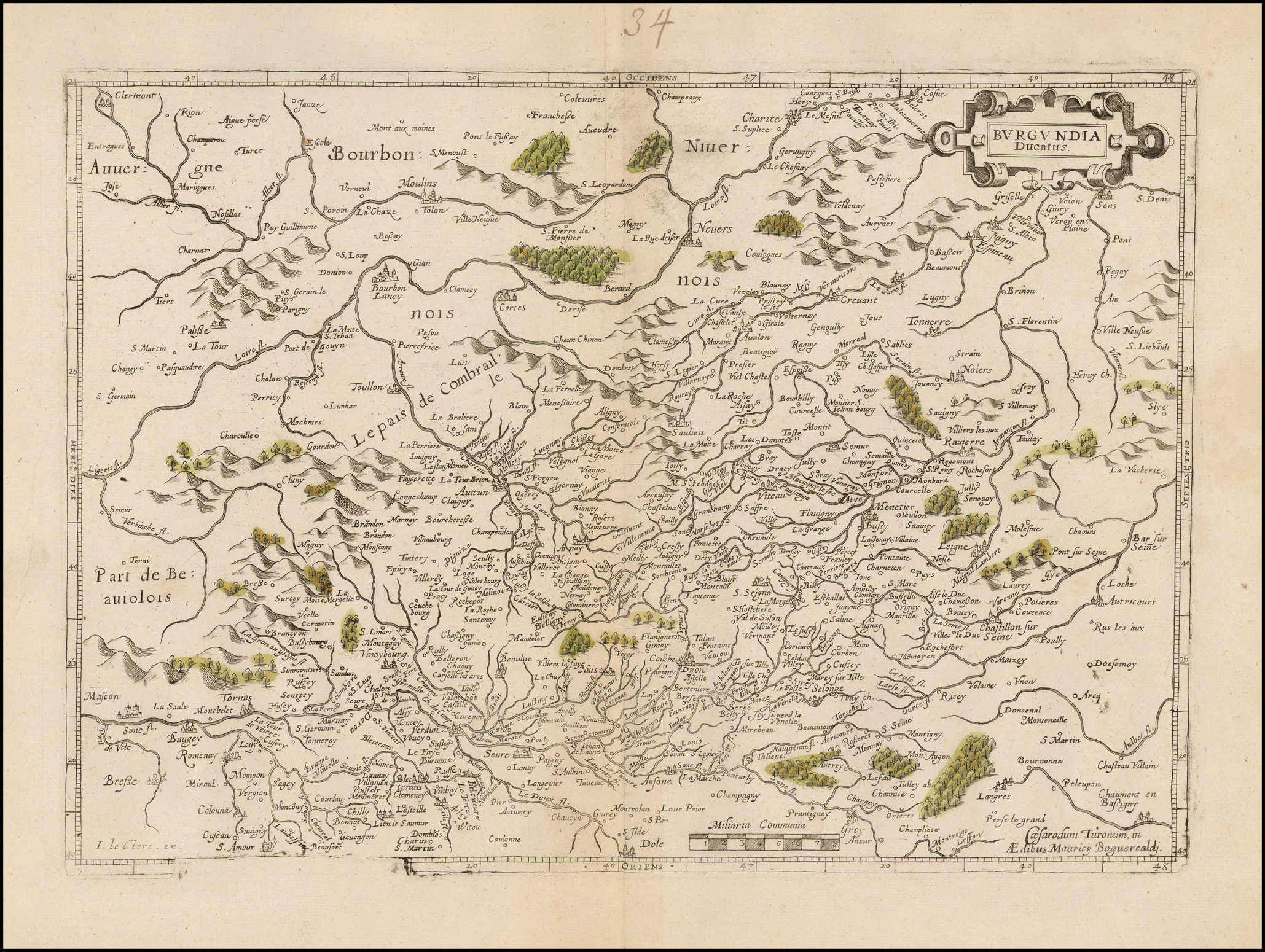
Burgundia Ducatus: Map of the Duchy of Burgundy from Maurice Bouguereau's atlas and edited by Le Clerc for his own atlas.

He had proved himself by 1587, at which date he was living and working on Rue Chartière in Paris. From 1590 to 1594 he took refuge in Tours, where he worked with the publisher and cartographer Maurice Bouguereau (15..–1596), who created Le Theatre Francoys, the first atlas of France; Le Clerc later drew on this work to create his own atlas. Le Clerc later worked at several different addresses in Paris: on Rue Saint-Jean-de-Latran until 1610 and then on Rue Saint-Jacques until 1621/24.

Jean Le Clerc's publications included portraits, maps, contemporary news events and other engravings by Jacques Granthomme (1560–1613), Pierre Firens (1580–1636) and Léonard Gaultier (1561–1635). He collaborated with the Dutch printmaker Thomas de Leu (1560–1612) to produce a collection of 179 biblical scenes, allegories, calendar pages and other works, probably published in 1606. They both produced engravings for it themselves as well as using works by Justus Sadeler (1580–1620), Isaac Briot (1585–1670) and Nicolas Briot (1579–1646).

On 20 December 1619 Le Clerc was granted a six-year royal concession to "engrave maps of the provinces of France and portraits of patriarchs and princes of the Hebrew people, with a chronological history" ("graver les cartes des provinces de France et les portraits des patriarches et princes du peuple hébreu avec l’histoire chronologique"). In 1620 he published his Le Théâtre géographique du Royaume de France, including newer plates as well as reworked plates from Bouguereau's work. The new plates were produced by artists such as Jean Fayen (1530–1616), Jodocus Hondius (1563–1612), Salomon Rogiers (1592–1640) and Hugues Picart (1587–1664). It went through several editions and Jean Le Clerc V continued to reissue it after his father's death.

== Bibliography ==
- Leo Bagrow: History of Cartography, Transaction Publishers, New Brunswick (USA) and London (UK) 2010, S. 256, ISBN 978-1-4128-1154-5
