= Benoît Antheaume =

French geographer

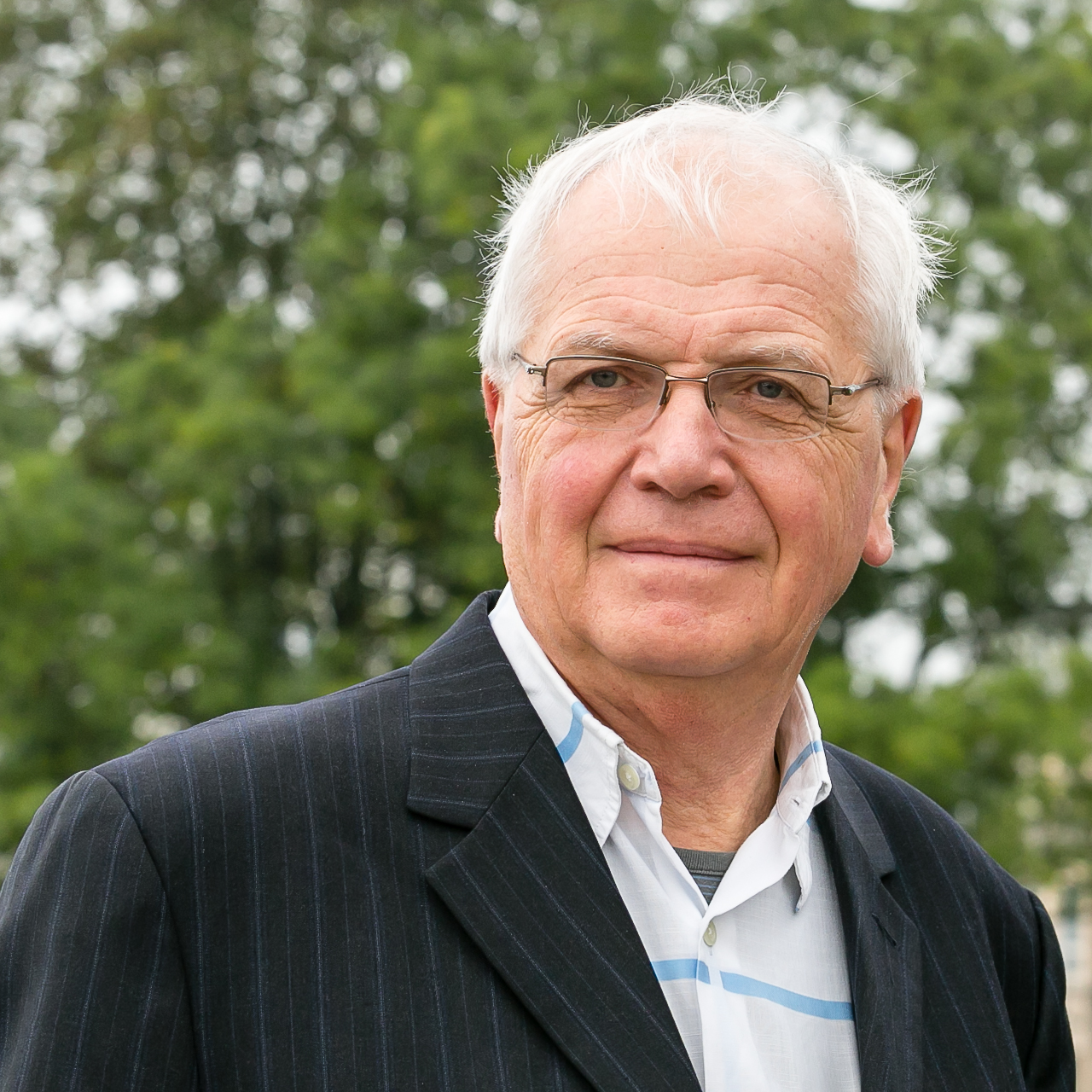
Benoît Antheaume in Saint-Dié-des-Vosges, 2013

Benoît Antheaume (born 1946) is a French geographer, specialising in the South Pacific region. He holds a doctorate in geography and is research director at the scientific institute ORSTOM. He has undertaken numerous research missions in Oceania, including in New Caledonia and New Zealand, and has written numerous scientific articles, as well as an Atlas of New Caledonia and an Atlas of the Islands and States of the Pacific with Joel Bonnemaison.

== Selected works ==
- 1988 - Antheaume B & Bonnemaison J. «Atlas des îles et États du Pacifique», Montpellier-Paris, coéd. GIP Reclus/Publisud 128 pp., 103 cartes couleurs
- 1995 - Antheaume B & Bonnemaison J. «Une aire Pacifique ?» coll. «Documentation photographique» Paris, La documentation française, photos couleurs, diapos, cartes, figures, 2 vol. 42 p & 12 p. (en collab. avec J. Bonnemaison)
- Antheaume B, Bonnemaison J., Bruneau M. & Taillard C.éds «Asie du Sud-Est, Océanie» Paris-Montpellier, Belin-Reclus, 480 p. coll Géographie Universelle, 7 sous la direction de R. Brunet
- 1999 - Antheaume B. & Deliry-Antheaume E. Cartes d'identité, les murs peints des villes d'Afrique du Sud Mappemonde
