= Ljubinka Nikolić =

Serbian geologist and geographer

- Born: 1964 (age 61–62); Belgrade, Serbia
- Education: Hunter College, Florence Design Academy, University of Belgrade
- Known for: Geological Engineering
- Scientific career
- Fields: Interior Design, Geography, Geosciences
- Workplaces: University of Belgrade

Ljubinka Nikolić is a Serbian designer and geoscientist born and raised in Belgrade, most well known for her participation in the now defunct Mars One project. Nikolić has a bachelor's degree in geological engineering as well as a master's in geography and interior design. She lives in Belgrade.

== Education ==
Born and raised in Belgrade, Nikolić studied at the University of Belgrade receiving her bachelor's degree in geological engineering. Shortly after, Nikolić travelled to the United States, attending Hunter College in New York City and getting a master's degree in geography. She later on attended the Florence Design Academy in Italy and received her second master's degree, one specialized in interior design.

== Mars One ==
The Mars One project was a Dutch colonization initiative for the planet Mars that was founded in 2011. Its aim was to establish a permanent human colony on the planet Mars by the year 2024. Nikolić was one of the few chosen to participate. Nikolić spoke about the project in early 2015, believing it to be a "bold and brilliant undertaking," and very much worth all the time and effort spent preparing. Nikolić, along with 99 other applicants were chosen from a pool of over 200,000 people, Nikolić herself being shortlisted to become one of the first to land on the planet due to her degree in Geological Engineering from the University of Belgarde's Geology and Mining program.

In 2019 Mars One filed for bankruptcy due to issues with stockholders and was permanently dissolved, cancelling the mission to Mars and leaving behind their plans for colonization. Despite all this, Nikolić believes that "The Red planet will be the next home for humanity".
