= Karl Helbig =

German explorer

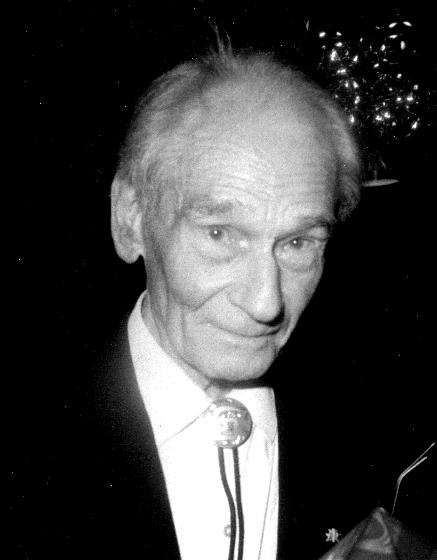
Karl Helbig in Hildesheim on July 18, 1988, after receiving the Order of Merit of the Federal Republic of Germany

Karl Martin Alexander Helbig (March 18, 1903 – October 9, 1991) was a German explorer, geographer, and ethnologist. His travels took him to Java, Sumatra, Borneo, and Central America, among other places.

Helbig's works are characterized by sharp powers of observation, instructive content, and clear, understandable language. In addition to his scientific works on geography and ethnography, he wrote popular travelogues, books for young people, and adventure novellas in which he presented his experiences to a wider public in a vivid and entertaining manner. The same applies to his lectures, which he gave at home and abroad in schools and scientific institutes. He spoke fluent English, Spanish, and Malay.

Helbig was awarded the Order of Merit of the Federal Republic of Germany with Ribbon and the State Prize for Science of the State of Mexico.

== Life ==
Helbig was born on March 18, 1903, in Hildesheim. Since the last quarter of the 19th century, professional surveying expeditions were active on behalf of the Dutch East Indian colonial government, which in decades of work surveyed and mapped large areas of the Malay Archipelago. The achievements of Karl Helbig deserve all the more recognition. Even in the 1930s, he succeeded in erasing white spots with traditional field research. He succeeded not only on the island of Borneo, whose interior was still unexplored over long distances, but also - following the research of Franz Wilhelm Junghuhn and Hermann von Rosenberg in the southern Batak - on the island of Sumatra, which was already relatively well developed at that time.

His travels in Central America were no less important. Here, too, Helbig entered unexplored areas. In Chiapas and in northeastern Honduras, his research led to a fundamental revision of the existing map material.

Helbig's research, however, was not limited to land surveys, which he - as a scientist left to his own devices - could only conduct in broad outlines, but also included geological, botanical, climatographic, ethnological and economic geographic studies. In his endeavors to create all-encompassing comprehensive representations, he often saw himself as a successor to his role model Junghuhn, whose writings he admired. The intensity with which he studied all available sources for this versatility is shown by his two thematically arranged and annotated bibliographies on Hind and Island India and Borneo.

=== Youth ===
Karl Helbig was born in Hildesheim on March 18, 1903, the son of the engineer Otto Helbig and his wife Ida, née Manß. In 1912 he transferred from the preschool to the Realgymnasium there and passed the school-leaving examination in 1921. In between, from 1919 to 1920, he served as a volunteer in the Border Guard East.

A difficult time followed for Helbig. In the winter of 1921, he worked at depths of up to 900 meters at 42 °C as a digger in a potash shaft near Diekholzen. His mother died at the end of 1921, and after his father suffered a severe heart attack in the spring of 1922, he was forced to support his sister Elisabeth, his father and himself alone. After working as a delivery man in a Thuringian brickyard, as a laborer on a farm near Peine, and as a helper on a stud farm near Celle, he began studying agriculture at the University of Göttingen in the fall of 1922. His attempt to finance his studies and the family upkeep as a stoker in a Göttingen hospital failed because of inflation, whereupon he had to abandon his studies in the summer of 1923.

His irresistible urge to see the wide world eventually led him to merchant navy, where he served as a coal trimmer and ship's stoker until 1951, and then as a greaser and assistant paymaster. His passages overseas were thus free of charge and with the pays he could at least partially finance his excursions, which were carried out with minimal effort.

His first trip was in 1923 on the steamer Drachenfels through the Red Sea to India, with stops in Karachi, Bombay, Colombo and Calcutta. In the port of Calcutta, he was handed a letter from his sister with the news of his father's death. Returning to Hamburg, the two siblings had become so destitute due to inflation that the urn containing their father's ashes had to be buried secretly at night in the family grave in Eisenach.

Eight more sea voyages followed until his study visit to Java. More than 60 ports were visited in the Malay Archipelago, in Mexico and the West Indies, in the Mediterranean in Istanbul and on the Levant coast.

=== Study and dissertation ===
In the fall of 1927, Helbig enrolled to study at the University of Hamburg. He studied geography with Siegfried Passarge, oceanography with Schultz and Schott, economic geography with Lütgens, climatology with Kuhlbrodt, geology and paleontology with Georg Gürich, Karl Gripp and Johann Wysogórski, and Indonesian languages with Dempwolff and Aichele. He financed his studies by working late and night shifts as a dockworker.

In the summer semester of 1929, Helbig was on leave. With the agreement of his doctoral advisor Siegfried Passarge, he traveled to Java as a stoker on the steamer Menes. He spent nine months in Batavia and its surroundings. Financially supported by Emil Helfferich, director of a German plantation syndicate, Helbig collected material for his dissertation, which focused on the development, the architectural structures, as well as the economic, colonial and cultural significance of Batavia, the capital of the Dutch East Indies. The result of this work, the dissertation Batavia. Eine tropische Stadtlandschaftskunde im Rahmen der Insel Java, complete with pictures, maps and drawings, was graded with distinction by the Faculty of Mathematics/Natural Sciences of the University of Hamburg on June 28, 1930; it was the first ever scientific account of a tropical urban landscape.

Since Batavia's sphere of influence was also important for its development, trips to Java and its neighboring island of Madura were also undertaken as part of these studies. Volcanoes and high plateaus were climbed and less frequented retreats were investigated. In 1929, his first work, Eine Diengwanderung, was published, followed in 1935 by the essays Der Kendeng, eine Kalklandschaft auf Südostjava and Bau und Bild der Insel Java. His book Ferne Tropen-Insel Java, a youth narrative about the life of a peasant boy in a Javanese village on the western slope of the Merapi volcano, is considered one of his most successful fiction publications. He recorded his travel experiences in his book Zu Mahamerus Füßen. Wanderungen auf Java.

=== Research in Sumatra ===
On September 4, 1930, Helbig sailed from Hamburg to Sumatra as a laundryman on the steamer S. S. Menes. It was not until October 19 that Belawan, the port of Medan on the Strait of Malacca, was reached.

For almost a year, extensive areas southeast and south of Lake Toba and the island of Nias off the west coast were explored. Accompanied by only one native porter, Helbig covered more than 2,000 kilometers on foot on partly still unknown paths. The research area extended on the one hand to the Batak south and southeast of Lake Toba, lying at a healthy altitude, and on the other hand to the sultanates of Asahan, Kualu, Bila, Kota Pinang and Pane in the then province of "East Coast of Sumatra", lying in the hot and unhealthy lowlands. These landscapes had never been described coherently before Helbig's research, and the extensive Simanalaksa Mountains, often referred to as the "Bila-Ketten", as well as large parts of the Habinsaran and Dolok landscapes were still largely unknown geographically and geologically. Helbig chose a mission house in Parsoburan in Habinsaran as his base. His longest march, which he undertook from here, lasted over three months. Ethnologically significant was his three-week visit in the summer of 1931 to the Orang Lubu, a remnant of the indigenous people of North Sumatra, who, with only 2190 individuals left, inhabited the eastern slopes of the Mandailing steppe valley in Central Sumatra. His main goal here was to record the language of this dying people for posterity.

Only after his return from Sumatra, on January 14, 1932, was he presented with his doctorate certificate in Hamburg. A few months later, on May 14, he became engaged in his hometown of Hildesheim to Liselotte Siebrecht, daughter of Heinrich and Doris Siebrecht. It did not come to a marriage.

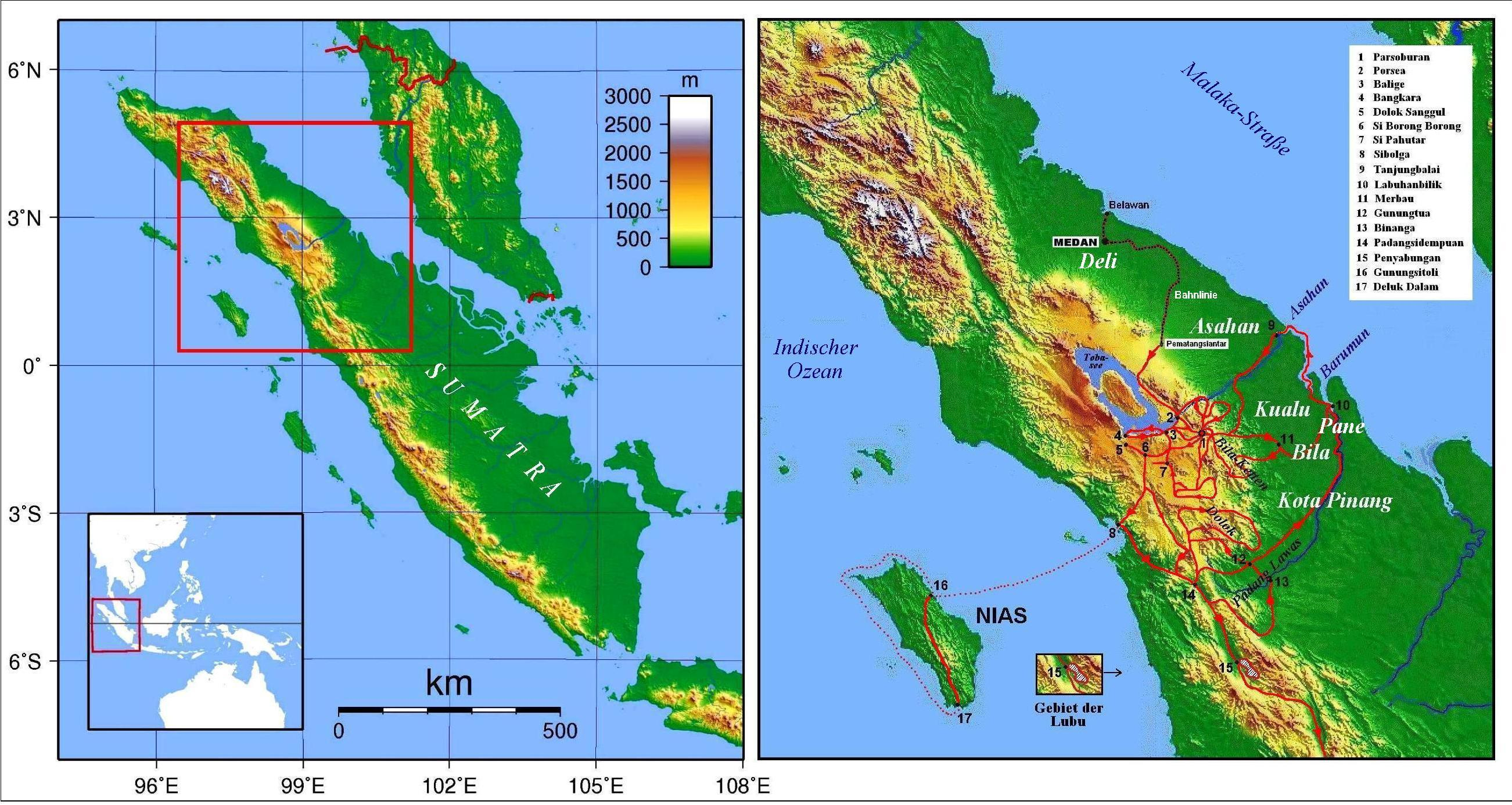
Helbig's travel routes in North Sumatra and on the island of Nias. Simplified according to Figure 4 in his study Beiträge zur Landeskunde von Sumatra. Beobachtungen zwischen Asahan und Barumun, Tobasee und Malakastraße.

The results of his travels in Sumatra were considerable. Twenty papers were published in journals, daily newspapers, and other organs. Most scientifically valuable is the study Beiträge zur Landeskunde von Sumatra. Beobachtungen zwischen Asahan und Barumun, Tobasee und Malakastraße. Also valuable are the eight articles, almost forgotten, that Helbig published in 1931 under the modest collective title Weniger bekannte Teilgebiete der Bataklande auf Sumatra in the journal Deutsche Wacht in Batavia: Habinsaran, Am Oberlauf des Koealoe, Die Bila-Ketten, Das Tal des Pahae, Das Hochtal von Sipirok, Das Bergland des Dolok, Die Gras-Steppen der Padang Lawas, Das Pane- und Bila-Gebiet. In addition to these geographic-geological descriptions, there are ethnological essays about the Toba-Batak, which deal with all aspects of their daily life, from the view of nature and religion to settlement and house construction and their moral conditions. A geographically and ethnologically substantial travelogue appeared in 1934 under the title Tuan Gila - ein verrückter Herr wandert am Äquator. This title was given to Helbig by the Batak people: This can only be a "crazy gentleman" who wanders across the steppes in the company of only one helper in a blazing sun!

In the highlands of northern Sumatra, Helbig came across a tea plantation run by the German family Heinrich Gundert. Inspired by a deep friendship with the five-year-old son of this family, which lasted until the end of his life, he wrote his book for young people Til kommt nach Sumatra. Das Leben eines deutschen Jungen in den Tropen.

=== Crossing the island of Borneo ===
After ship voyages to the Caribbean, the European North Cape, Leningrad and once more to Central America, Helbig embarked on his largest voyage in November 1936. As the world's only ship's stoker with a doctorate, he traveled to Jakarta on the cargo ship Hanau. After initial studies in West Java and on the tin islands of Bangka and Belitung, he arrived in Pontianak on the west coast of Borneo in April 1937. From here he embarked on one of the most strenuous expeditions of the pre-war period: while other explorers used waterways almost without exception, Helbig was the first to cross the island of Borneo on a 3,000-kilometer zigzag path through almost impassable jungle, mostly on foot. He accomplished this with only one white companion, German navigator Erich Schreiter, and with three, or at most four, native porters, mostly female, who were changed from village to village. Rarely has an exploration voyage of this magnitude been accomplished with so little material expenditure.

The expedition initially led along the west coast in the direction of Sarawak. In the mountains in the northwest of the then "Wester-Afdeeling" (Western Division), the Dayak tribes of Songkong, Ketungan and Iban were visited. From there the trek went to Sanggau, Sekadau and Sintang on the Kapuas River and again north towards Sarawak. After circling the lake area of the upper Kapuas, Putussibau was reached at the headwaters of this river; then the Madi Plateau was traversed in a southerly direction. Accompanied by only three porters, the Schwaner Mountains were overcome, an undertaking that involved great hardship because of the need to carry a boat. Beyond this watershed, in the "Zuider- en Ooster-Afdeeling" (South and East Divisions), Helbig and Schreiter went down the Kahayan River, visited the Ngaju and Ot-Danum Dayak, and participated in a nocturnal death ritual at Tumbang-Mahuroi. Continuing in an easterly direction, they crossed the headwaters of the "little" Kapua and Barito rivers and reached the upper Mahakam at Tering and Longiram. Following this river downstream, they entered the vast lake district on its lower course and navigated Lake Jempang in a boat. The final point of the west–east crossing, which was completed with numerous detours and side trips, was the city of Samarinda above the Mahakam delta.

From here followed a traverse of the southeastern part of Borneo, along a petroleum pipeline through the coal and oil region between Samarinda and Balikpapan, through the grassy steppe country of Pasir inhabited by Mohammedan Kutai and Pasirese, and across the Meratus Mountains into the densely populated stream area of the lower Barito. In November 1937, eight months after setting out from Pontianak, the expedition ended at Banjarmasin in southern Borneo.

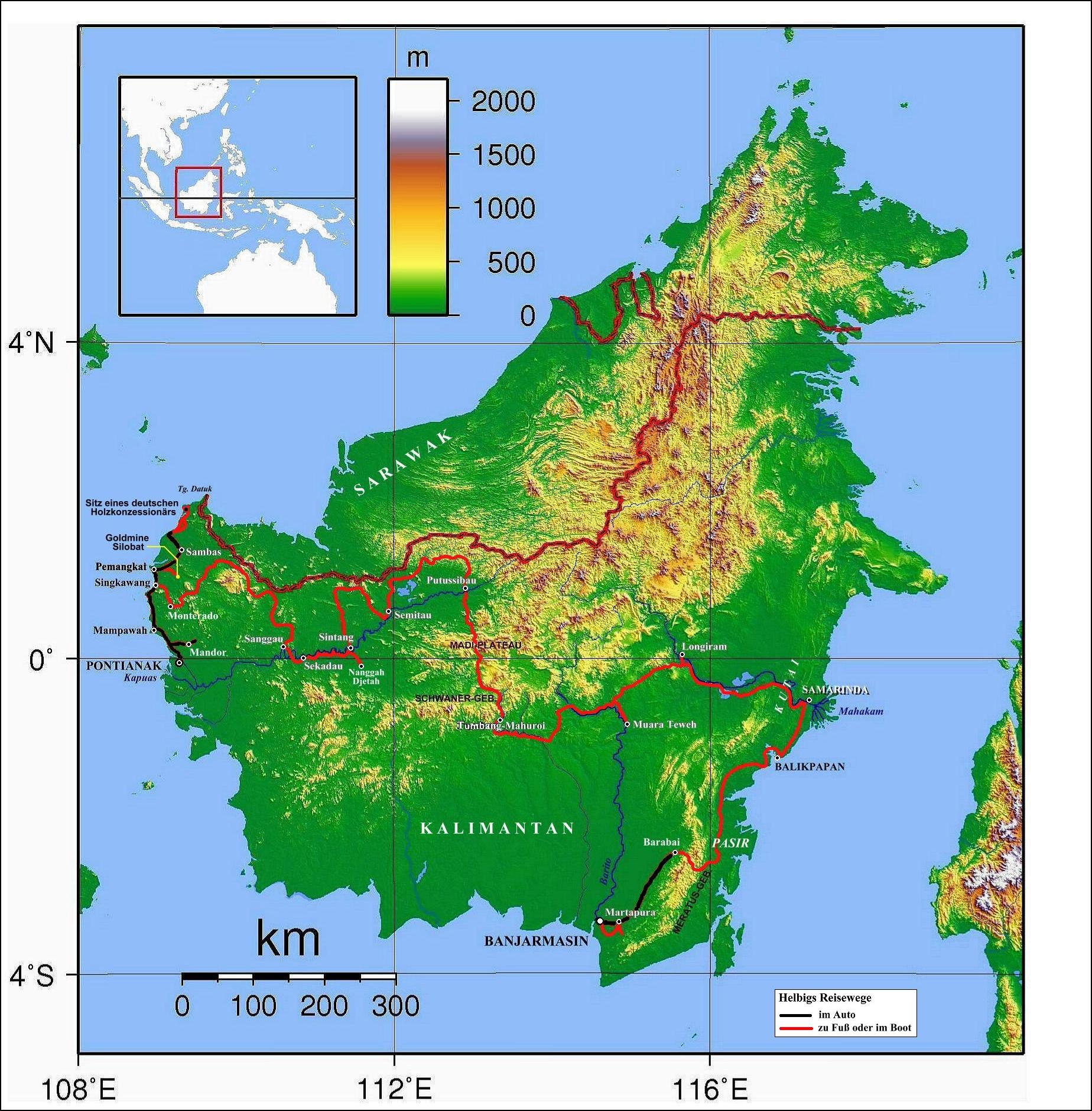
Helbig's zigzag march through Borneo. Simplified after the folding map in his work Eine Durchquerung der Insel Borneo (Kalimantan). Nach den Tagebüchern aus dem Jahre 1937.

Helbig was interviewed about this journey at the age of 86 in his apartment in Hamburg-Altona by film producer Sonja Balbach. The crossing of Borneo was 52 years ago. As a result of this interview, on January 15, 1990, the television station Südwest 3 broadcast the film Borneo. Auf den Spuren von Karl Helbig was broadcast.

Apart from numerous lectures and publications in domestic and foreign youth and professional magazines, daily newspapers and journals and the popular travelogue Urwaldwildnis Borneo, the scientific results of this expedition were not presented to German readers until 45 years later. In 1982, the two-volume work Eine Durchquerung der Insel Borneo (Kalimantan). Nach den Tagebüchern aus dem Jahre 1937 was published by Dietrich Reimer in Berlin. With its almost 800 pages in octavo, richly illustrated with drawings, maps and photographic images and provided with valuable scientific appendices, it is still an important book for those interested in Borneo. "The two volumes possess the rank of a standard work indispensable for Kalimantan research. They once again prove the author to be one of the best Indonesian connoisseurs in the German-speaking world during the pre-war period" (Werner Röll).

Helbig has explained the reasons for the delay in the publication of this work in the first volume:

"[...] By the middle of 1938, I was back in Germany. The Second World War, which broke out soon after, set many other tasks. The destruction of important source material in Hamburg and elsewhere made further elaboration of the results difficult. The unsettled situation in the Dutch colonial territory and in the entire Far East delayed many an insight and many a decision to validly form the material, and even more so any attempt to carry out a supplementary control trip. Later research undertakings and study trips in other areas, mainly in Mexico and Central America, furthermore in the Soviet Union, Scandinavia and several Mediterranean countries, together with various elaborations of the results, prevented the continuation of the scientific evaluation of my Borneo diaries. [...] The advancing age and the worry to have to leave the diaries unused after all, whereby they - especially since they are written in a shorthand no longer in use today - would have to be regarded as completely lost, drove me again and again to the continuation of the undertaken task". – Helbig, 1982

Helbig remained in the Dutch East Indies until the beginning of February 1938. He traveled through Java one more time, then to the island of Bali and its neighboring island of Nusa Penida. Bali. Erfüllungen und Enttäuschungen, Bali: Eine tropische Insel landschaftlicher Gegensätze, Nusa Penida, die Insel der „Banditen“ and Nusa Penida. Eine tropische Karstinsel are his most important essays on the latter islands.

Helbig arrived back in Hamburg in mid-1938 after an absence of one and a half years. It was his last trip to Southeast Asia.

=== Habilitation ===
In 1940 Helbig's habilitation thesis was accepted by the Philosophical Faculty of the University of Marburg. It was entitled: Die Insel Bangka. Beispiel des Landschafts- und Bedeutungswandels auf Grund einer geographischen Zufallsform. He collected the material for this work on Bangka before starting his Borneo expedition. Added to this was the habilitation lecture given in Marburg on December 2, 1940, Menschen im Urwald. Bericht über eine Reise zu den Dayak auf Borneo. Helbig, however, refused to join the NSDAP, which he despised, and so universities remained closed to him as a university lecturer.

=== War and post-war period ===
During World War II, Helbig worked as a civilian in the military support with the geographical training of officers and soldiers in Norway, Romania, the Netherlands, France, Belgium, Russia and other European countries. In the winter of 1944, he witnessed the retreat of the German army and the misery of the German refugees.

In 1949 he met the geographer and historian Dietmar Henze, with whom he remained in stimulating contact until his death. Helbig introduced Henze to researchers such as the meteorologist Johannes Georgi and the polar and earth scientist Alfred Wegener, and on his and Walter Behrmann's recommendation Henze was admitted to the Gesellschaft für Erdkunde zu Berlin in 1951.

In the same year, 1951, after he had again traveled to North America as a stoker on a freighter, Helbig was offered professorships - in both German states - by the universities of Hamburg, Leipzig, Jena, Rostock, and Greifswald. Nevertheless, he continued to freelance. This forced him to be as frugal as possible.

=== Research in Central America ===
At the suggestion of Franz Termer, director of the Hamburg Museum für Völkerkunde, Helbig turned to scientific studies in Central America. In 1953/54, with stopovers in Mexico, Guatemala, and San Salvador, his first geographic study trip, supported by the German Research Foundation, took him to the northeastern provinces of the Republic of Honduras, then little known to geographic science, which he traversed for seven months, mostly on foot, on some major rivers, and in the coastal lagoons by boat. He published part of his scientific results in his works Die Landschaften von Nordost-Honduras auf Grund einer geographischen Studienreise im Jahre 1953 and Antiguales (Altertümer) der Paya-Region und die Paya-Indianer von Nordost-Honduras. Fundamental corrections of the map material available until then about this area brought Helbig's several times folded colored map Entwurf einer topographischen Übersicht von Nordost-Honduras mit der Mosquitia: The height and arrangement of the mountains, the course of the rivers, the shape of the lagoons, the location of the settlements as well as traffic connections and place names were corrected. A hitherto nameless mountain complex was christened "Montaňas del Patuca" by Helbig. Of his popular scientific publications about these journeys, the best known are the books Von Mexiko bis zur Mosquitia and Indioland am Karibischen Meer.

Helbig's travel routes in northeastern Honduras. - Simplified representation according to the map Entwurf einer topographischen Übersicht von Nordost-Honduras mit der Mosquitia. In: Petermanns Geographische Mitteilungen, 101. Jahrgang, Gotha 1957, Heft 2, Tafel 15.

His next trip took him to central and southern Mexico in 1957/58. The focus of his research was the state of Chiapas. Following Leo Waibel's work in the Sierra Madre de Chiapas, the areas of the great depression of the upper Rio Grijalva and the Mesa Central, which adjoin this mountain range to the north, were studied, as well as the more recent changes in the coffee-growing areas of the Sierra Madre de Chiapas due to war, agrarian reform, new development and migration. Of scholarly value are his monographs Die Landschaft Soconusco im Staate Chiapas, Süd-Mexico, und ihre Kaffeezone and Das Stromgebiet des Rio Grijalva; eine Landschaftsstudie aus Chiapas, Süd-Mexiko. Among other essays in journals and newspapers, these travels also resulted in the first edition of his successful book So sah ich Mexiko mit dem Untertitel Forschungsfahrt von Tampico bis Chiapas.

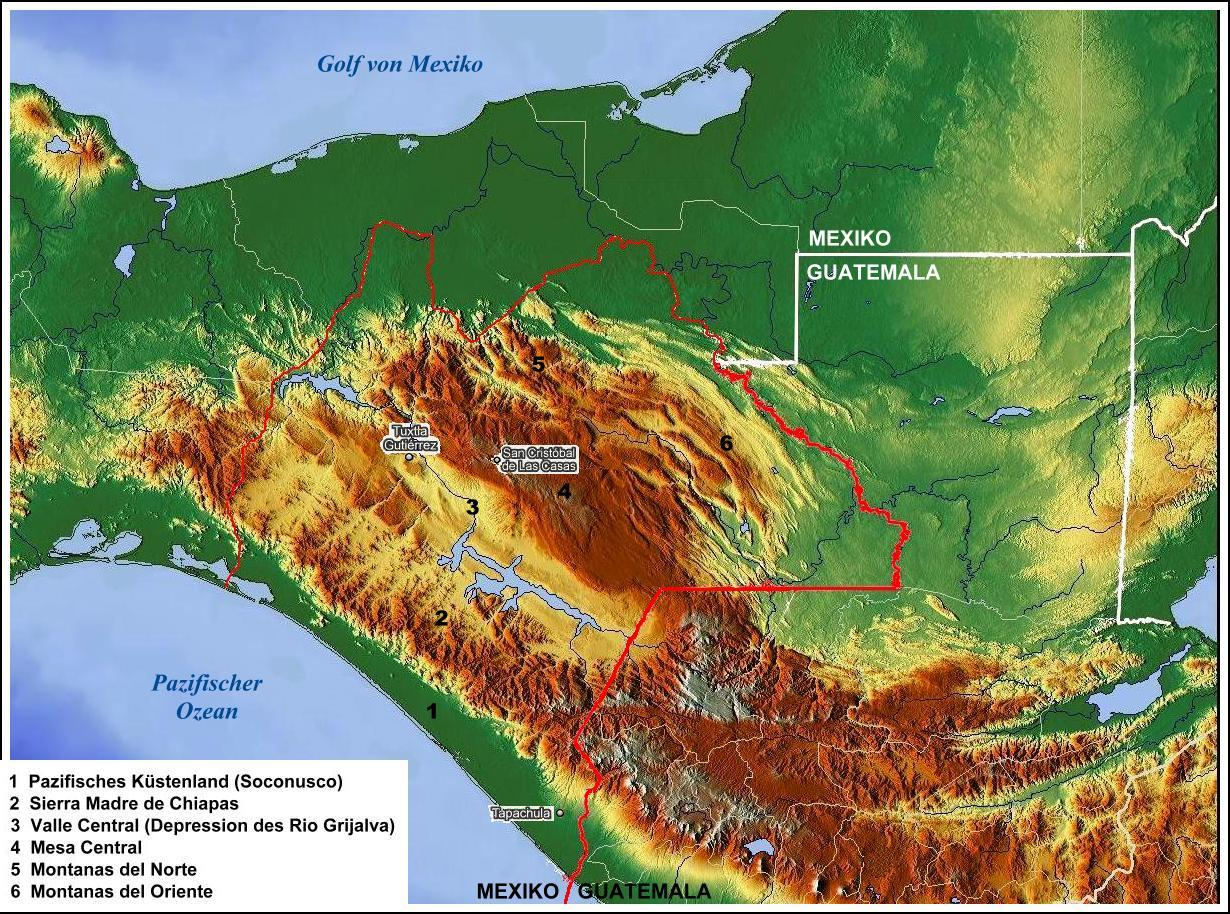
Chiapas. Landscape division according to Karl Helbig. Simplified after Fig. 1 in Helbig's essay Das Stromgebiet des oberen Rio Grijalva ..., Hamburg 1961. - The reservoirs in the depression of the Rio Grijalva did not exist at that time.

Again supported by the German Research Foundation, Helbig traveled from Mexico through Guatemala, San Salvador, British Honduras, Nicaragua, and Costa Rica to eastern Panama in 1962 to 1963. The purpose of these trips was to make a geographical and economic survey of all of Central America, to observe the changes in the landscape due to the influences of expanding agriculture, and to explore possibilities for the future planned development of this area. To this end, Helbig made a supplementary trip to northern Mexico as far as Monterrey to conclude his studies. The scientific results were published in the works Zentralamerika. Natürliche Grundlagen, ihre gegenwärtige und künftig mögliche Auswertung and Die Wirtschaft Zentralamerikas. Kartographisch dargestellt und erläutert were published. The book So sah ich Mexiko was revised and republished in 1967 with the subtitle Von Monterrey bis Tapachula.

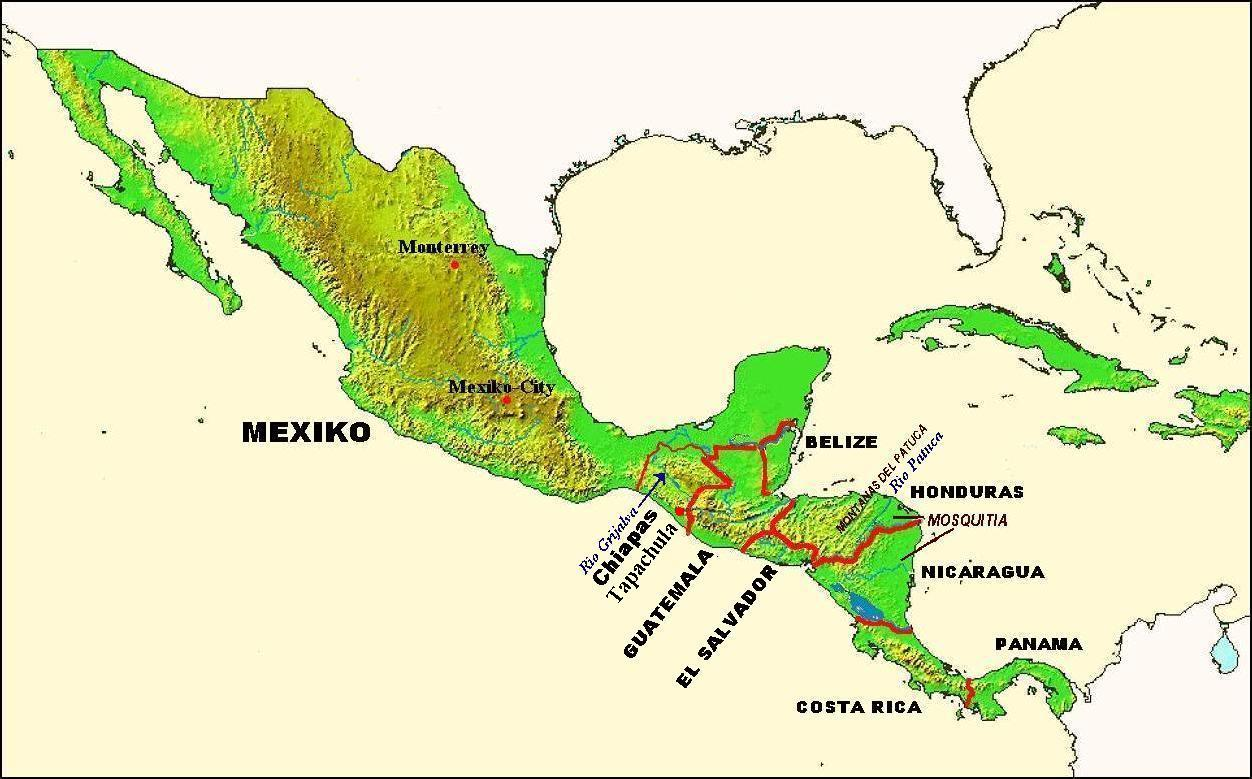
Overview map of Central America

In 1971, Helbig was commissioned by the Mexican government to conduct geographic research in the state of Chiapas. Extensive field research had to be carried out. As in all previous excursions as a scientist on his own, he worked for five years on this large project. He summarized his findings in the three-volume regional monograph Chiapas. Geografia de un Estado Mexicano, whose printing and publication he personally supervised in Mexico City. In honor of this great folio work, which was published only in Spanish, he was awarded the "Chiapas State Prize, Science Department."

=== Last years of life ===
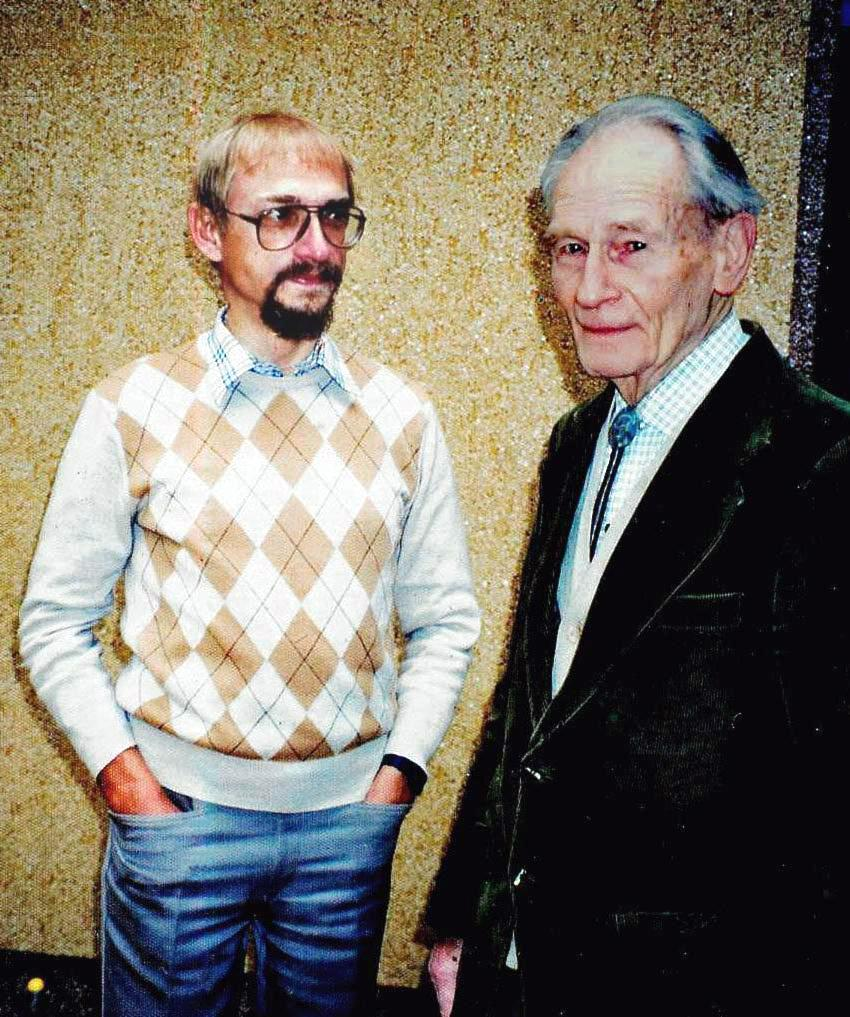
Karl Helbig as a guest of Rüdiger Siebert in May 1989

On December 21, 1973, his housekeeper Emma Mahler, née Fillsack (* 1884), whom he described in a dedication in his two-volume work on Borneo as his "... caregiver and selfless companion accompanying me for almost five decades," died. For her burial, he bought two gravesites at the Altona cemetery opposite his last apartment: one for Mrs. Mahler and next to it one for himself.

His last work is entitled Seefahrt vor den Feuern. Erinnerungen eines Schiffsheizers. This book, which describes in novel style the voyage of a steamship to Central America in the 1920s, not only reports on the technology and handling of the boiler systems and propulsion engines in steamships, but also on the hard work of coal trimmers and ship heaters in the heat and dust, which until then had hardly ever been appreciated. The book was published in German. The presentation of this book took place in the port of Travemünde on board the steam icebreaker Stettin, an occasion on which the 84-year-old Helbig himself once again became active "in front of the fires": "With youthful verve," as his publisher Hans Georg Prager described him, he demonstrated to the guests all the activities required for expert "fire tending," from monitoring the steam pressure and water levels in the boilers to shoveling in the coal, crushing the slag and hauling the ashes. In July 1988, on a voyage of the Stettin from Kiel to Travemünde, he showed his skills as a ship's stoker at sea for the last time at the age of 85.

In the fall of 1987, TV journalist Eberhard Fechner interviewed eleven seafarers who had still experienced the days of sailing and steam ships. In addition to four captains, two ship's engineers, a ship's cook, a sailmaker, a chief steward and a ship's carpenter, Helbig was there as a trimmer and stoker. On February 1, 1989, Fechner's report was broadcast in two parts by ARD and WDR under the title La Paloma. As a result, the magazine Der Spiegel published the article Fernsehen. Halber Weg zur Karibik, in which "the stern-looking man with the angular features" was described as "Fechner's secret hero."

In the last years of his rich research life, Helbig was restlessly busy organizing his ethnographic and literary estate. The ethnographica he collected ended up in the Museum für Völkerkunde Hamburg and the Museum für Völkerkunde Stuttgart, as well as in the ethnographic collection of the Roemer- und Pelizaeus-Museum in Hildesheim. The latter museum also holds his literary works, his photo collection, and his library.

In appreciation of his merits in the cultural-geographical field, Helbig was awarded the Federal Cross of Merit on Ribbon on July 18, 1988, during a ceremony in the town hall of his hometown Hildesheim. After the conclusion of the ceremonial speeches, Helbig himself spoke up. The following day, the Hildesheimer Allgemeine Zeitung devoted almost a full page to his stories.

On October 9, 1991, Helbig succumbed to a heart attack in his apartment in Hamburg-Altona. He died in the arms of Helmut Gundert, the man he had met as the five-year-old son of plantation owner Heinrich Gundert in Sumatra in 1931 and whom he preserved for posterity as "Til" in articles and books.

In his last will and testament, Helbig had stipulated that the public would not be informed of his passing until three weeks later. The funeral service on October 22 at Friedhof Bernadottestraße Cemetery therefore took place quietly: Only 14 people signed the condolence list. The Hildesheimer Allgemeine Zeitung also respected Helbig's last will and published the obituary only on October 30, 1991.

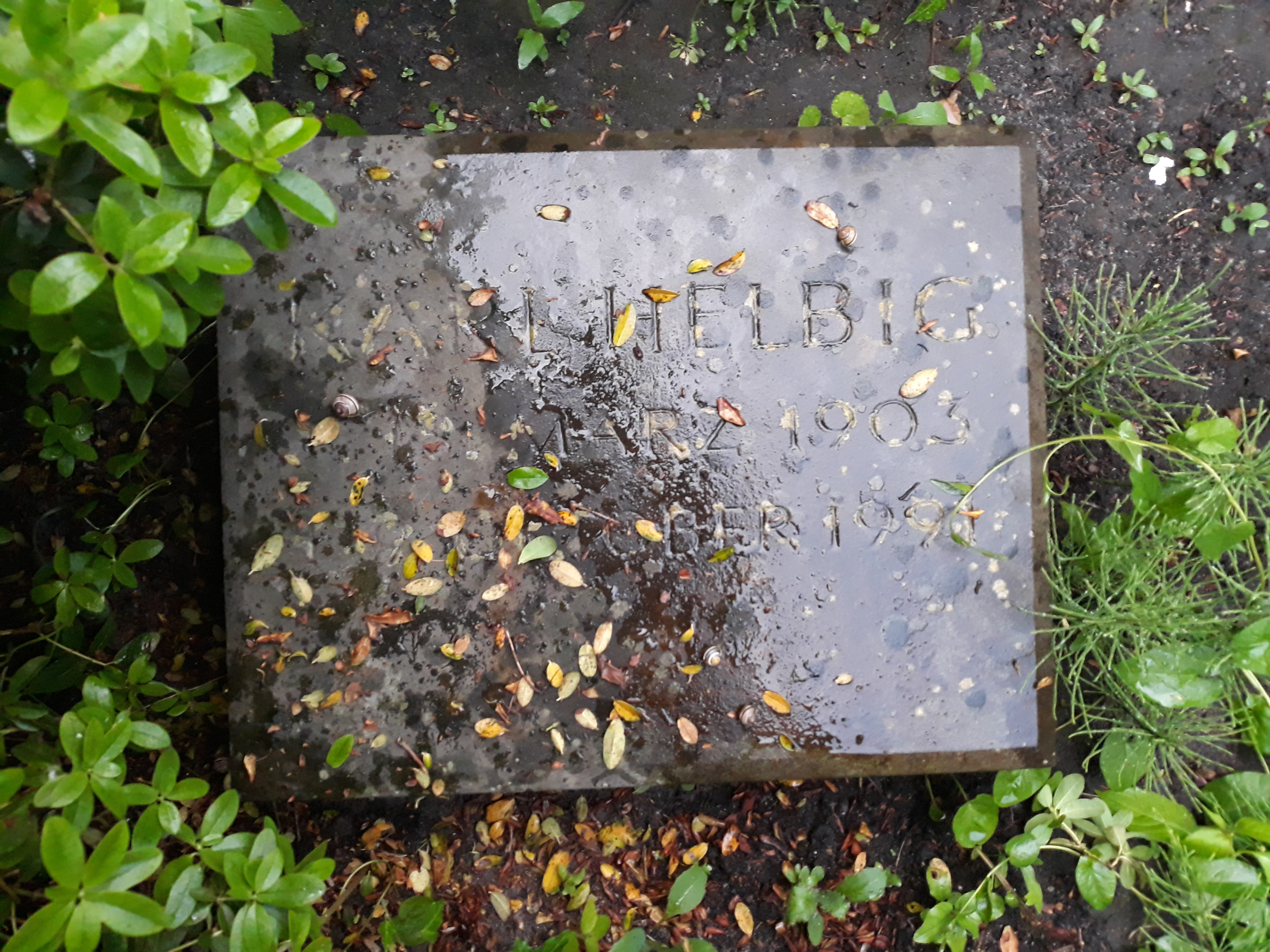
The grave of Karl Helbig at the Friedhof Bernadottestraße cemetery in Hamburg

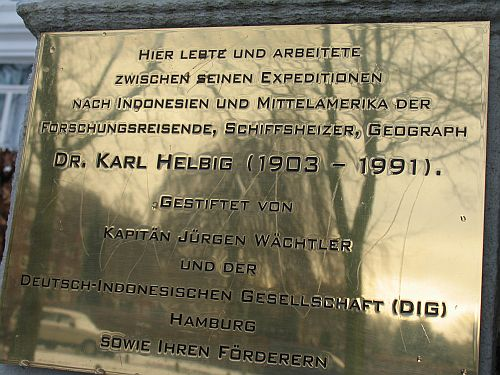
Commemorative plaque for Karl Helbig

From March 20 to 22, 2003, on the occasion of his 100th birthday, his native city of Hildesheim honored him with a scientific colloquium. At his last residence in Hamburg-Altona, Bleickenallee 22, a brass memorial plaque commemorates Karl Helbig.

== Expeditions, research and study trips ==
=== In the Dutch Indies (today Indonesia) ===
- 1929: Batavia, Java
- 1931: Sumatra
- 1937: Java, Bangka, Belitung, Bali, Borneo (Kalimantan)

=== In Central America ===
- 1953-1954: Mexico, Guatemala, El Salvador, Honduras
- 1957-1958: Mexico (Chiapas)
- 1962-1963: Mexico, Guatemala, El Salvador, British Honduras, Nicaragua, Costa Rica, Panama
- 1971-1975: Mexico (Chiapas)

== Ships on which Karl Helbig had signed on (selection) ==
- 1923: S. S. Drachenfels, as trimmer to India
- 1923: S. S. Altona, as trimmer to the Netherlands Indies
- 1925: S. S. Ursula Siemers, as trimmer and stoker to the Mediterranean Sea
- 1925: S. S. Schleswig Holstein, as stoker to Mexico
- 1926: S. S. Pontos, as stoker to the Mediterranean Sea
- 1928: S. S. Galicia, as stoker to the Caribbean (this voyage provided the material for Helbig's last work Seefahrt vor den Feuern)
- 1929: S. S. Menes, as a scrubber to Batavia (studies for his dissertation)
- 1929: S. S. Ramses, as a scrubber back from Batavia
- 1930: S. S. Menes, to Belawan-Deli (studies on Sumatra)
- 1931: S. S. Freiburg, returned from Batavia as a scrubber and steward
- 1934: S. S. Oceana, as stoker to Scandinavia
- 1935: S. S. Antioch, as stoker to West Indies and back
- 1936: S. S. Hanau, as stoker to Batavia and back in 1938 (Borneo crossing).
- 1951: S. S. Clara Blumenfeld, as stoker 1951 to the US, 1952 and 1953 to the North Sea and Baltic Sea
- 1953: M. S. Westfalen, as greaser to Mexico (studies in Honduras)
- 1954: M. S. Cläre Hugo Stinnes, returned from Mexico as a greaser
- 1957: M. S. Vulkan, as assistant paymaster to Cuba and Mexico (studies in Central and Southern Mexico)
- 1958: M. S. Augsburg, returned from Mexico as assistant paymaster
- 1962: M. S. Saarland, as deck clerk to Guatemala (studies in Central America)
- 1963: M. S. Leipzig, returned from Mexico as assistant purser
- 1971: M. S. Siegstein, as purser's assistant to Mexico (studies in Chiapas)
- 1972: T. S. Essen, returned from Mexico as assistant paymaster
- 1975: M. S. Frankfurt, as paymaster assistant to Mexico (studies in Chiapas)
- 1976: M. S. Frankfurt, returned from Mexico as purser's assistant (last voyage as a member of a ship's crew).

== Works ==
=== Books and major essays on Dutch India (Indonesia) ===
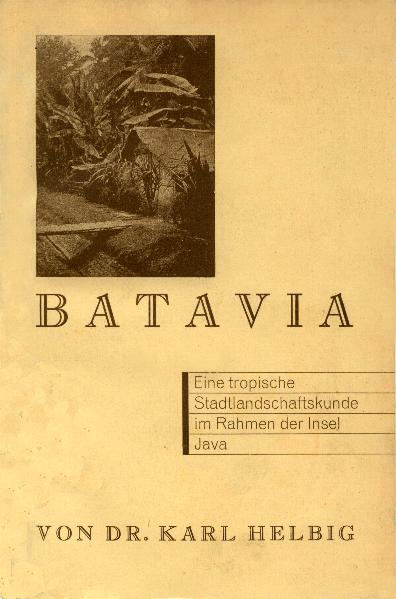
Dissertation front cover

- Batavia. Eine tropische Stadtlandschaftskunde im Rahmen der Insel Java. C. H. Wäsers Druckerei, Bad Segeberg. Ohne Jahresangabe (das Vorwort ist datiert „Hamburg, im Sommer 1930“. Die Prüfung und Wertung dieser Arbeit erfolgte im Juni 1930. In Petermanns Mitteilungen, 78. Jahrgang 1932, Geographischer Literaturbericht p. 314, Literaturbesprechung Nr. 533 wird 1931 als Erscheinungsjahr genannt). – Dissertation zur Erlangung der Doktorwürde, angenommen von der Mathematisch-Naturwissenschaftlichen Fakultät der Universität Hamburg.
- Bei den Orang-Loeboe in Zentral-Sumatra. In: Baessler-Archiv, Verlag von Dietrich Reimer (Ernst Vohsen), Bd. XVI, pp. 164–187. Berlin 1933.
- Die Lubu-Sprache auf Sumatra. In: Zeitschrift für Eingeborenensprachen, Verlag von Dietrich Reimer (Ernst Vohsen), Band XXIV, Heft 1 (1933), pp. 15–58, Band XXIV, Heft 2 (1934), pp. 100–121. Berlin 1933/34.
- Bei den Orang Loeboe in Zentral-Sumatra. In: Deutsche Wacht, Batavia, Jg. 1934, Nr. 8, pp. 32–33, Nr. 9, pp. 29–31, Nr. 10, pp. 30–33, Nr. 11, pp. 30–31, Nr. 14, pp. 30–32.
- Tropischer Urwald und Mensch. Langensalza, Verlag von Julius Beltz, Berlin-Leipzig, ohne Jahresangabe (Zwei Auflagen, 1934). – Raum und Volk. Erdkundliche Arbeitshefte. Hrsgg. von Mathias Volkenborn u. Severin Rüttgers. Gruppe II. Räume der Sammler und Jäger. Heft 1 [Über Helbigs Reise zu den Orang Lubu].
- Tuan Gila. Ein „verrückter Herr“ wandert am Äquator. Leipzig, Brockhaus 1934. – Reisen und Abenteuer, Band 54 (Zweite, im Text und Bildmaterial geringfügig erweiterte Auflage: Leipzig, Brockhaus 1945).
- Die Welt der Malaien. Langensalza, Verlag von Julius Beltz, Berlin-Leipzig, ohne Jahresangabe (1934). – Raum und Volk. Erdkundliche Arbeitshefte. Hrgg. von Mathias Volkenborn u. Severin Rüttgers. Gruppe V. Räume der Braunen und Gelben. Heft 5.
- Til kommt nach Sumatra. Das Leben eines deutschen Jungen in den Tropen. Gundert, Stuttgart 1935 (zahlreiche Auflagen bis 1957)
- Einige Bemerkungen über die sittlichen Zustände und die Erotik der Toba-Batak auf Sumatra. In: Baessler-Archiv, Verlag von Dietrich Reimer (Ernst Vohsen), Band XVIII, S. 22–37. Berlin 1935.
- Das südliche Batakland auf Sumatra. In: Ostasiatische Rundschau, Hamburg 19, Jg. 1938, pp. 278–281, 302–305, 329–332, 491–493, 515–517, 540–542.
- Die Insel Bangka. Beispiel des Landschafts- und Bedeutungswandels auf Grund einer geographischen „Zufallsform“. In: Deutsche Geographische Blätter. Herausgegeben von der Geographischen Gesellschaft in Bremen durch Dr. Herbert Abel unter Mitwirkung von C. Honigsheim. – Schriften der Bremer Wissenschaftlichen Gesellschaft, Reihe C, Band 43, Heft 3–4, Bremen 1940 (Kommissionsverlag Franz Leuwer). – Habilitationsschrift, angenommen von der Philosophischen Fakultät der Universität Marburg (auch als Sonderdruck veröffentlicht).
- Bangka-Zinn. In: Geographischer Anzeiger, 43. Jahrgang 1942, Heft 1/2, pp. 26–29. Hierzu die Tafeln 1 bis 3 mit 6 s/w-Photoabbildungen. Justus Perthes, Gotha 1942.
- Beiträge zur Landeskunde von Sumatra. Beobachtungen zwischen Asahan und Barumun, Tobasee und Malaka-Straße. Ferdinand Hirt & Sohn, Leipzig 1940. – Wissenschaftliche Veröffentlichungen des Deutschen Museums für Länderkunde. Neue Folge 8.
- Urwaldwildnis Borneo. 3000 Kilometer Zick-Zack-Marsch durch Asiens größte Insel. Gustav Wenzel & Sohn, Braunschweig 1940 (2. Auflage 1941, 3. Auflage 1942; auch erschienen bei Brockhaus, Leipzig 1957).
- Hinter- und Insel-Indien (1926–1939/40). In: Ludwig Mecking (Hrsg.): Geographisches Jahrbuch. Begründet 1866 durch E. Behm, fortgesetzt durch H. Wagner. 57. Jahrgang 1942. Justus Perthes, Gotha 1943. Erster Halbband pp. 138–360, Zweiter Halbband pp. 547–791. Personennamen-Register im 1. Halbband pp. 344–360 (dieser Teil enthält auch Personennamen eines vorangestellten Beitrags), im 2. Halbband pp. 770–791. Zum Personennamen-Register für den Abschnitt C (2. Halbband, Insel-Indien) wurden drei Seiten Berichtigungen nachgeliefert. – Bibliographie der von 1926 bis 1939/40 erschienenen Veröffentlichungen für das Gebiet Hinter- und Insel-Indien von der indisch-burmesisch-chinesischen Grenze bis zu den östlichsten Inseln des Malaiischen Archipels, einschließlich der Andamanen- und Nikobaren-Gruppe, Cocos- und Christmas Islands und der Philippinen. 3.576 Titel sind mit genauen bibliografischen Angaben gelistet. Die Sortierung dieser Titel ist ein seltenes Beispiel einer mustergültigen Fleißarbeit: Nach einer Übersicht über das Gesamtgebiet sind sie regional nach Ländern, innerhalb dieser nach Sachgebieten und in diesen Sachgebieten nach Themengruppen mit einleitenden Erläuterungen geordnet. Wissenschaftlich verwertbare Titel sind mit kurzen kritischen Inhaltsangaben und – sofern vorhanden – mit Hinweisen auf Rezensionen mit Quellenangaben versehen.
- Indonesien [Bibliographie]. In: Naturforschung und Medizin in Deutschland 1939–1946. Für Deutschland bestimmte Ausgabe der Fiat Review of German Science. Band 45 Geographie Teil II, Hrsgg. von Hermann v. Wissmann, Geograph. Institut der Univ. Tübingen. pp. 53–61. Dieterich’sche Verlagsbuchhandlung Inh. W. Klemm, Wiesbaden (ohne Jahresangabe). – Ergänzung der vorgenannten Arbeit. In thematischer Ordnung sind 85 Titel mit einleitenden Kommentaren gelistet.
- Einige Bemerkungen zum Weltbild der Ngadjoe-Dajak. In: Baessler-Archiv, Verlag von Dietrich Reimer, Bd. XXIV, pp. 60–79. Berlin 1941.
- Ferne Tropen-Insel Java. Ein Buch vom Schicksal fremder Menschen und Tiere. Gundert, Stuttgart 1946 (2. Auflage 1952).
- Ferne Tropen-Insel Java. Ein Buch vom Schicksal fremder Menschen und Tiere. Eine Auswahl. Schaffstein, Köln 1950 (2. Auflage 1965). Gekürzte Ausgabe des zuvor genannten Buches: Von Marianne Spitzler mit freundlicher Genehmigung des Verfassers und des Verlages D. Gundert aus Karl Helbig Ferne Tropen-Insel Java ausgewählt und vom Niedersächsischen Kultusministerium mit Erlass Nr. III/3056/50 vom 27. Juni 1950 für den Schulgebrauch genehmigt. – Einhundertsechzehntes der „Grünen Bändchen“.
- Indonesiens Tropenwelt. Kosmos/Gesellschaft der Naturfreunde. Franckh’sche Verlagshandlung, Stuttgart 1947.
- Die südostasiatische Inselwelt (Inselindien). Franckh’sche Verlagshandlung (In Lizenz des Siebenberg-Verlages, Wien). – Kleine Länderkunden. Unser Wissen von der Erde. Hrsgg. v. Dr. habil. W. Evers, Privatdozent der Geographie an der Technischen Hochschule Hannover, Reihe IV, Heft 7. Stuttgart 1949
- Indonesien. Eine auslandskundliche Übersicht der Malaiischen Inselwelt. Franz Mittelbach, Stuttgart 1949.
- Am Rande des Pazifik. Studien zur Landes- und Kulturkunde Südostasiens. Kohlhammer, Stuttgart 1949.
- Paradies in Licht und Schatten. Erlebtes und Erlauschtes in Inselindien. Vieweg, Braunschweig 1949.
- Inselindien. Heimat der Malaien. Eilers & Schünemann Verlagsgesellschaft mbH., Bremen 1953. – ES-Heft Nr. 92.
- Zu Mahamerus Füssen. Wanderungen auf Java. Brockhaus, Leipzig 1954.
- Die Insel Borneo in Forschung und Schrifttum. Im Selbstverlag der Geographischen Gesellschaft Hamburg. In: Mitteilungen der Geographischen Gesellschaft in Hamburg. Im Auftrage des Vorstandes herausgegeben von Prof. Dr. Franz Termer. Band 52, pp. 105–395. Hierzu die Tafeln 16–24 mit 19 s/w-Photoabbildungen. Hamburg 1955. – Thematisch geordnete und kommentierte Bibliographie, 2410 Werke enthaltend, mit ausführlicher Darstellung der Entdeckungsgeschichte.
- Eine Durchquerung der Insel Borneo (Kalimantan). Nach den Tagebüchern aus dem Jahre 1937. 2 Bände. Dietrich Reimer Verlag, Berlin 1982. ISBN 3-496-00153-4 (brosch.) und ISBN 3-496-00154-2 (Leinen). – Mit unverändertem Inhalt, jedoch in kleinerem Format, als Sonderband in: Mitteilungen der Geographischen Gesellschaft in Hamburg, 1982 (2 Bände, Teil 1 und 2).

=== Books and major essays on Central America ===
- Die Landschaften von Nordost-Honduras. Auf Grund einer geographischen Studienreise im Jahre 1953. Hermann Haack, Gotha 1959. – Ergänzungsheft 268 zu Petermanns Geographische Mitteilungen.
- Antiguales (Altertümer) der Paya-Region und die Paya-Indianer von Nordost-Honduras (Auf Grund einer geografischen Erkundungsreise im Jahre 1953). Museum für Völkerkunde und Vorgeschichte, Hamburg 1956. – Beiträge zur mittelamerikanischen Völkerkunde, Band 3.
- Von Mexiko bis zur Mosquitia. Kleine Entdeckungsreise in Mittelamerika. Brockhaus, Leipzig 1958.
- Indioland am Karibischen Meer. Zentralamerikanische Reise. Brockhaus, Leipzig 1961.
- Die Landschaft Soconusco im Staate Chiapas, Süd-Mexico, und ihre Kaffeezone. Friedrich Trüjen, Bremen 1961. In: Deutsche geographische Blätter, Band 49, Heft 1/2.
- Das Stromgebiet des oberen Rio Grijalva. Eine Landschaftsstudie aus Chiapas, Süd-Mexiko. In: Mitteilungen der Geographischen Gesellschaft zu Hamburg, Band 54, pp. 7–274, Hamburg 1961
- Zentralamerika. Natürliche Grundlagen, ihre gegenwärtige und künftig mögliche Auswertung. In: Petermanns Geographische Mitteilungen, 108. Jahrgang, pp. 160–181 und 241–260, mit 40 s/w-Abbildungen auf 8 Tafeln. VEB Hermann Haack, Gotha 1964
- So sah ich Mexiko – Forschungsfahrt von Tampico bis Chiapas. Brockhaus, Leipzig 1962.
- Die Wirtschaft Zentralamerikas. Kartographisch dargestellt und erläutert. Institut für Iberoamerika-Kunde, Hamburg 1966.
- Unter Kreolen, Indios und Ladinos: Von Belize bis Panama – Reiseeindrücke aus den sieben Ländern Zentralamerikas. Brockhaus, Leipzig 1966.
- So sah ich Mexiko – Von Monterrey bis Tapachula. Brockhaus, Leipzig 1967 (Neuauflage der Ausgabe von 1962).
- Chiapas: Geografia de un Estado Mexicano (2 Textbände und 1 Kartenband). Instituto de Ciencias y Artes de Chiapas, Tuxtla Gutiérrez (Chiapas), 1976.

=== Books and major essays on other topics ===
- Kurt Imme fährt nach Indien. Die Geschichte von der ersten Seereise eines Hamburger Schiffsjungen. Gundert, Stuttgart 1933 (zahlreiche Auflagen bis 1955).
- Levantepott im Mittelmeer. Kurt Immes abenteuerliche Seefahrt mit Mustafa, Krischan und den Dalmatinern. Für deutsche Jungen erzählt. Gundert, Stuttgart 1934.
- Nordkap in Sicht. Eine unerwartete Nordlandreise. Gundert, Stuttgart 1935.
- Vorderindien (zusammen mit R. E. Kaltofen). In: Fritz Kluthe (Hrsg.): Handbuch der Geographischen Wissenschaft. Band Vorder- und Südasien, pp. 212–326. Akademische Verlagsgesellschaft Athenaion, Potsdam 1937.
- Von den Ländern und Meeren der Welt. D. Gundert, Stuttgart 1947. – Wir fangen an. Ein Ruf an die Jugend und ein Wort auf den Weg. Eine Schriftenreihe begründet von Friedrich Gundert † herausgegeben von Kurt Müller. Heft 4.
- Trampfahrt in die Levante: Erlebnisse und Abenteuer mit allerlei Schiffsvolk auf blauen Wassern für die Jugend erzählt. Gundert, Stuttgart 1950. – Gunderts Blaue Jugendbücher (Neufassung des 1934 erschienenen Buches „Levantepott im Mittelmeer“).
- Seefahrt vor den Feuern. Erinnerungen eines Schiffsheizers. H. G. Prager Vlg., Hamburg 1987 (2. durchgesehene Auflage 1988).

Some books were translated into Czech, Slovak, Swedish and Russian, works on Central America into Spanish. For decades, Mrs. Gertrud Tischner, wife of the South Seas explorer Herbert Tischner, contributed as a book illustrator.

=== Smaller writings ===
About 600 essays, treatises, teaching templates, and book reviews were published in youth and professional journals, as well as in domestic and foreign daily newspapers. One of the most important organs for Helbig's early articles was the magazine Deutsche Wacht published in Batavia. Outstanding are the numerous illustrated articles published from 1948 to 1974 in the yearbook series "Durch die weite Welt", Stuttgart, Franckh'sche Verlagshandlung.

== Bibliography ==
- Werner Röll: Karl Helbig. Leben und Werk. In: Bernhard Dahm (Hrsg.): Asien. Deutsche Zeitschrift für Politik, Wirtschaft und Kultur. Im Auftrage der Deutschen Gesellschaft für Asienkunde e. V., Hamburg. Nr. 26, Januar 1988, pp. 59–63.
- Rüdiger Siebert: Geograph und Seemann, Wissenschaftler und Welterkunder: Karl Helbig (1903–1991). In: Ingrid Wessel (Hrsg.): Indonesien am Ende des 20. Jahrhunderts. Analysen zu 50 Jahren unabhängiger Entwicklung – Deutsche in Indonesien. 2. Auflage. Abera, Hamburg 1999, ISBN 3-934376-07-X
- Rüdiger Siebert: Promovierter Dampfschiff-Heizer erforscht Borneo. Karl Helbig, Geograph und Seemann. In: Deutsche Spuren in Indonesien. Zehn Lebensläufe in bewegten Zeiten. Horlemann, Bad Honnef 2002, pp. 154–173.
- Werner Rutz, Achim Sibeth (Hrsg.): Karl Helbig – Wissenschaftler und Schiffsheizer. Sein Lebenswerk aus heutiger Sicht. Rückblick zum 100. Geburtstag. Olms, Hildesheim u. a. 2004, ISBN 3-487-12721-0. (Inhaltsverzeichnis als Digitalisat, PDF-Datei).
