= Karl Eduard Meinicke =

German geographer

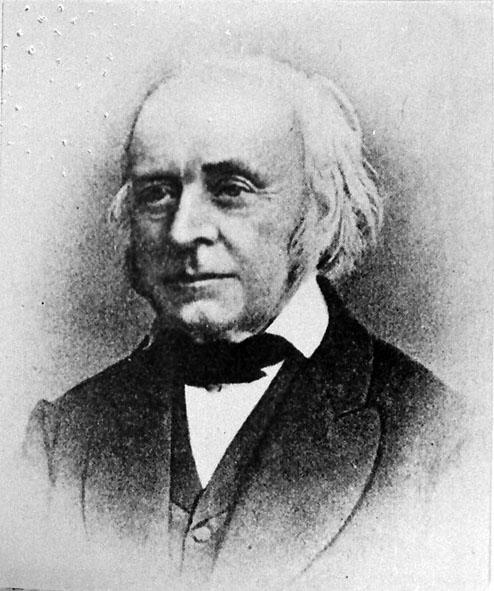
Carl Eduard Meinicke, 1868

Karl Eduard Meinicke (August 31, 1803, in Brandenburg an der Havel – August 25, 1876, in Dresden) was a German geographer.

== Early life ==
Meinicke was the son of merchant Carl Meinicke and his wife Johanna Henriette (née Wolfschmidt). His parents moved to Potsdam three years after his birth. A brother of his grandfather was the stablemaster of Frederick the Great. He initially attended a gymnasium in Potsdam for six and a half years, where he received his scientific education. From 1822 to 1825, he studied ancient philology, geography, and history under August Boeckh, Carl Ritter, and Friedrich von Raumer at the University of Berlin.

== Career ==
Meinicke worked at the gymnasium in Prenzlau starting in September 1825. Here, he initially worked as a collaborator, from 1829 as a subrector, and from 1833 as a conrector. In 1838, he was appointed a professor and served as the director from 1846 to Easter 1852, as the previous director, Schultze, was ill. From 1852 until his retirement in Easter 1868, he was the director of this institution. Afterward, he lived in Dresden until his death.

His main subjects of instruction were primarily geography and history, as well as Greek in the higher classes and, at times, Latin in the middle levels, and in the Tertia, natural sciences and French. In his long teaching career, he was considered diligent and conscientious but also strict. He was involved in implementing the system of Realklassen (real classes), and the number of students was later nearly doubled.

Meinicke had made a name for himself as a geographer in scientific circles. Through his work, he came into contact with other scientists, including Carl Ritter and the brothers Alexander and Wilhelm von Humboldt, with whom he corresponded, as well as Leopold von Buch, who visited him at his home. His main work, Die Südseevölker und das Christentum (The South Sea Peoples and Christianity), was published in 1844. After taking over the directorate, he had hardly any time to write further works. It wasn't until after his retirement that he published his last major work, Die Inseln des großen Ozeans (The Islands of the Great Ocean). He also authored a geography textbook for upper classes and a guidebook for lower classes. He delivered numerous lectures at the Verein für Erdkunde zu Dresden (Association for Geography in Dresden).

On a personal level, Meinicke was rather unpopular among those who did not know him well, as he appeared to them as heartless, cold, and stern. He was considered one of the most thorough experts on the Polynesian island world, even though he had never traveled there.

== Works ==
Versuch einer Geschichte der europäischen Kolonien in Westindien (Attempt at a History of European Colonies in the West Indies). Weimar, 1831 ([Karl Eduard Meinicke is available for free viewing and download at the Internet Archive]). Beiträge zur Ethnographie Asiens (Contributions to the Ethnography of Asia). Prenzlau, 1837. Das Festland Australien. Eine geographische Monographie; nach den Quellen dargestellt (The Mainland of Australia. A Geographic Monograph; Presented According to the Sources). 2 Volumes, F. W. Kaldersberg, Penzlau, 1837, Volume 1 ([Karl Eduard Meinicke is available for free viewing and download at the Internet Archive]), Volume 2 (books.google.de). Die Südseevölker und das Christentum (The South Sea Peoples and Christianity). Penzlau, 1844 ([Karl Eduard Meinicke is available for free viewing and download at the Internet Archive]). Die Inseln des Stillen Ozeans (The Islands of the Pacific Ocean). 2 Volumes, Leipzig, Volume 1: Melanesien und Neuseeland (Melanesia and New Zealand). 1875 ([Karl Eduard Meinicke is available for free viewing and download at the Internet Archive]), Volume 2: Polynesien und Mikronesien (Polynesia and Micronesia). 1876 ([Karl Eduard Meinicke is available for free viewing and download at the Internet Archive]).

== Literature ==
Sophus Ruge: Carl E. Meinicke. Eine biographische Skizze (Carl E. Meinicke. A Biographical Sketch). In: XV. Jahresbericht des Vereins für Erdkunde zu Dresden (Fifteenth Annual Report of the Association for Geography in Dresden). Scientific Part. A. Huhle, Dresden, 1878, pp. 56–85 ([Karl Eduard Meinicke is available for free viewing and download at the Internet Archive – with correspondence]). Meinicke, Karl Eduard, Geographer. In: Meyers Konversations-Lexikon. 4th edition. Volume 11, Verlag des Bibliographischen Instituts, Leipzig/Vienna 1885–1892, p. 433. Uta Lindgren (1990). "Meinicke, Carl Eduard". Neue Deutsche Biographie (in German). Vol. 16. Berlin: Duncker & Humblot. pp. 673–674. (full text online).Friedrich Ratzel (1885). "Meinicke, Carl Eduard" . Allgemeine Deutsche Biographie (in German). Vol. 21. Leipzig: Duncker & Humblot. pp. 237–238.
