= Elena Berezovich =

Russian linguist

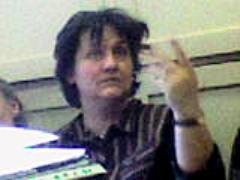
- Born: January 2, 1966 (age 60); Yekaterinburg, Russia
- Occupation: Linguist

Academic background
- Thesis: Russian Toponymy from an Ethnolinguistic Perspective (1999)

Elena Lvovna Berezovich (Russian: Елена Львовна Березович, born 1966) is a Russian linguist known for her work in onomastics, etymology, and ethnolinguistics. She is currently a professor at the Department of Russian Language and General Linguistics of the Ural Federal University (Yekaterinburg). Professor of the Russian Academy of Sciences (RAS), corresponding member of the RAS (elected in 2016).

== Biography ==
Elena Berezovich was born in Yekaterinburg in 1966. She graduated in 1988, from the Ural State University. In 1992 she defended her PhD thesis Semantic Microsystems in Russian Toponymy. After defending her habilitation thesis (the Russian degree of Doktor nauk) Russian Toponymy from an Ethnolinguistic Perspective in 1999, she became professor of the Philological Department of the Ural State University (now Ural Federal University). Since 2006 Elena Berezovich has also been a research fellow of the Russian Language Institute in Moscow.

== Work ==
Her main domains of research are onomastics, etymology, semantic reconstruction, dialectology and ethnolinguistics. Elena Berezovich is head of the Ural Toponymy Expedition, executive director of the Russian Onomasticon Project, member of the Ethnolinguistic commission of the International Committee of Slavists, editor-in-chief of the journal Questions of Onomastics, founded by her university mentor Prof. Aleksandr Matveyev. She is also the editor of several onomastic dictionaries and the definitive Dictionary of Northern Russian Dialects.

== Main publications ==
- Russian Toponymy from an Ethnolinguistic Perspective. Yekaterinburg, 2000.
- Language and Traditional Culture: Ethnolinguistic Inquiries. Moscow, 2007.
