= Antipode (journal) =

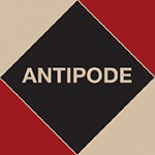
- Logo for Antipode Foundation
- Discipline: Geography
- Language: English
- Edited by: S. Chari, T. Jazeel, K. McKittrick, J.Pickerill and N.Theodore

Publication details
- History: 1969-present
- Publisher: Wiley Blackwell for the Antipode Foundation
- Frequency: 5/year
- Impact factor: 1.915 (2015)

Standard abbreviations
- ISO 4: Antipode

Indexing
- ISSN: 0066-4812 (print); 1467-8330 (web)
- LCCN: sf77000176
- OCLC no.: 39738266

Links
- Journal homepage; Antipode Foundation; All issues

Antipode: A Radical Journal of Geography is a peer-reviewed scientific journal published five times per year by Wiley-Blackwell and produced by The Antipode Foundation. Its coverage centers on critical human geography and it seeks to encourage radical spatial theorizations based on Marxist, socialist, anarchist, anti-racist, anticolonial, feminist, queer, trans*, green, and postcolonial thought. Originally inspired by the social justice movements of the 1960s, the journal supports progressive causes through the work of the Antipode Foundation, a UK registered charity. Antipode is also known for its online "Interventions", its book series, and its diverse workshops and lectures. The chief co-editors are Sharad Chari, Tariq Jazeel, Katherine McKittrick, Jenny Pickerill and Nik Theodore.

== History ==
Antipode was founded in 1969 by a group of graduate students and junior faculty of the Geography Department at Clark University. It was conceived at the end of a graduate seminar led by David Stea as an attempt to address the pressing issues of the time. The geographers were inspired by movements of the 1960s such as the protests against the Vietnam War, the Civil Rights Movement, and the increasing concern for pollution and environmental deterioration. They sought to produce a "radical geography": one that would directly address the root causes of the major societal issues of the time. Embedded in this project was an attempt to reorient the discipline of geography itself, reworking its relationship with social change and intellectual inquiry.

The first issue of Antipode began with a statement written by David Stea:

We are soliciting articles for a journal that in future issues may damn articles and journal alike. For the moment, traditional communication media are being used for the dissemination of non-traditional ideas.

Our goal is radical change – replacement of institutions and institutional arrangements in our society that can no longer respond to changing societal needs, that stifle attempts to provide us with a more viable pattern for living, that often serve no other purpose than perpetuating themselves. We do not seek to replace existing institutions with others which will inevitably take the same form; rather, we look to a new ordering of means in accordance with a new set of goals.

In its early years, the journal was independently published and it relied heavily on the unpaid labor of graduate students. Publications were not peer-reviewed and were often solicited from sympathetic authors. The editing and formatting of the Journal was conducted in a basement office and illustrations were hand drawn, mimeographed, and glued by hand. Copies of the journal were then individually addressed and mailed to subscribers.

In the 1970s, under the editorship of Richard Peet, the Journal reflected a growing engagement with Marxist political economy. During this time, the support of well-known academics, such as David Harvey and Richard Morrill, was crucial to the Journal's development, particularly when it came under attack from more established sectors of the discipline. In 1971, the journal would publish David Harvey's "Revolutionary and Counter Revolutionary Theory in Geography and the Problem of Ghetto Formation," a landmark paper in the rise of Marxist geography and critical human geography. Feminist geography appeared first in Antipode, then in other journals, an article by Alison Hayford, "The Geography of Women: An Historical Introduction."

Phil O'Keefe, who co-edited the journal with Kirsten Johnson from 1978 to 1980, outlined a plan to professionalize the journal. In 1980 the journal adopted a peer-reviewed format and in 1985 co-editors with Peet, Eric Sheppard and Joe Doherty negotiated a publishing contract with Blackwell (now Wiley-Blackwell) publishing company. This move has been criticized as corporatizing the journal and undermining the intentions set out by the journal's founders. Nonetheless, the journal has flourished in the subsequent decades and it seeks to "continue to push Geography's radical and critical edge" while remaining self-critical.

Today Antipode is widely regarded as one of the most influential academic journals in the discipline of geography. The Antipode Foundation Ltd., registered July 2011 in England and Wales, manages the production of Antipode: A Radical Journal of Geography as well as several other projects promoting and supporting critical human geography. The foundation organizes the Institute for the Geographies of Justice, the Scholar-Activist Project Awards, the Antipode Book Series, and a diverse array of lectures and workshops including the well-attended AAG Antipode Lecture.

== Notable articles ==
- Feminist geography - Hayford, Alison. (1974). The Geography of Women: An Historical Introduction. - Katz, C. (2001). Vagabond Capitalism and the Necessity of Social Reproduction. Antipode, 33(4): 709–728.
- Gentrification - Smith, N. (2002). New globalism, new urbanism: Gentrification as global urban strategy. Antipode, 34(3): 427–450.
- Neoliberalism - Peck, J., & Tickell, A. (2002). Neoliberalizing space. Antipode, 34(3): 380–404.
- Political ecology - Swyngedouw, E., & Heynen, N. C. (2003). Urban political ecology, justice and the politics of scale. Antipode, 35(5), 898–918.
- Marxist geography - Harvey, D. (1972). Revolutionary and Counter Revolutionary Theory in Geography and the Problem of Ghetto Formation. Antipode, 4(2): 1–13.
- Anderson, James. 1985, ed. The Best Of Antipode 1969-1985: Articles. Worcester, MA. 186p.

== Editors-in-Chief ==
Name	Years
Ben Wisner	1969-1970
Richard Peet	1970-1978, 1978-1985
Phil O'Keefe	1978-1980
Kirsten Johnson	1978-1980
Eric Sheppard	1986-1991
Joe Doherty	1986-1992
Richard Walker	1991-1999
Linda McDowell	1993-1999
Jamie Peck	2000-2003
Jane Wills	2000-2003
Noel Castree	2004-2009
Melissa Wright	2004-2009
Paul Chatterton	2009-2013
Vinay Gidwani	2009-2014
Nik Heynen	2009-2013
Wendy Larner	2009-2013
Rachel Pain	2009-2011
Sharad Chari	2012–present
Tariq Jazeel	2014–present
Katherine McKittrick	2012–present
Jenny Pickerill	2013–present
Nik Theodore	2013–present

Note: Since 2009, Antipode has been edited by a committee of five members serving non-renewable terms lasting up to five years.

== Abstracting and indexing ==
This journal is indexed in by the following services:

- Current Contents/ Social and Behavioral Sciences
- Arts & Humanities Citation Index
- Social Sciences Citation Index
- GeoBase
- CSA (database company)
- VINITI
