= Stephen Rice =

Stephen Rice may refer to:

- Stephen Rice (footballer) (born 1984), Irish footballer
- Stephen O. Rice (1907–1986), American electrical engineer
- Stephen Rice (journalist) (born 1957), Australian journalist
- Stephen Rice (judge) (1637–1715), chief baron of the exchequer in Ireland
- Stephen Rice (academic) (fl. 1990s–2020s), geographer
- Stephen Spring Rice (1814–1865), Anglo-Irish civil servant and philanthropist
- Stephen Spring Rice (1856–1902), British civil servant and academic
- Stephen E. Rice (c. 1905–1958), United States Tax Court judge

== See also ==
- Steven Rice (born 1971), ice hockey player
- Steven Rice (composer) (born 1979), American composer
