= Mark Jayne (academic) =

British geographer and academic

Mark Jayne is a British geographer and academic. From 2015 to 2019, he had been Professor of Human Geography at Cardiff University. He is now a Professor at the School of Geography and Planning, Sun Yat-sen University.

== Education and career ==
Jayne graduated from Keele University with a BA in geography, sociology and social anthropology in 1991. In 1995, he completed an MA in geography at the University of Sussex, and then carried out doctoral studies at Staffordshire University from 1997 to 2000; his PhD was awarded in 2002 for his thesis "Geographies of consumption and urban regeneration: a case study of Stoke-on-Trent".

Jayne began his academic career as a lecturer at Staffordshire University (1997–2001), after which he was a teaching fellow at the University of Birmingham for a year, and then spent two years as a development officer at Staffordshire University. In 2004, he was a research associate at the University of Sheffield, and then spent a year as a research fellow at the University of Leeds in 2005. He then joined the University of Manchester with the title Lecturer in Human Geography in 2005. He was promoted to a senior lectureship in 2011, and a readership in 2013. He moved to Cardiff University in 2015 to be Professor of Human Geography.

== Publications ==
- (Edited) Chinese Urbanism: Critical Perspectives (Routledge, 2017).
- (Edited with Kevin Ward) Urban Theory: New Critical Perspectives (Routledge, 2016).
- (Co-authored with Gill Valentine) Childhood, Families, Alcohol (Ashgate, 2016).
- (Edited with Tim Edensor) Urban Theory Beyond 'the West': A World of Cities (Routledge, 2012).
- (Co-authored with Gill Valentine and Sarah Holloway) Alcohol, Drinking, Drunkenness: (Dis)orderly Spaces (Ashgate, 2011).
- (Co-authored with Gill Valentine, Sarah Holloway and Charlotte A. Knell) Drinking Places: Where People Drink and Why (Joseph Rowntree Foundation, 2007).
- (Co-authored with David Bell) Small Cities: Urban Experience Beyond the Metropolis (Routledge, 2006).
- Cities and Consumption, Routledge Critical Introductions to Urbanism and the City (Routledge, 2005).
- (Edited with David Bell) City of Quarters: Urban Villages in the Contemporary City (Ashgate, 2004).
