= Mona Domosh =

American geographer and academic

Academic background
- Education: Clark University

Academic work
- Discipline: Geographer
- Institutions: Dartmouth College

Mona Domosh (born 1957) is a geographer and academic, and currently holds the Joan P. and Edward J. Foley Jr. 1933 Professorship of Geography at Dartmouth College.

== Career ==
Domosh received her bachelor's, master's, and Ph.D. from Clark University, and completed a postdoctoral fellowship at Loughborough University. She was a professor at Florida Atlantic University from 1990 to 2000, before becoming a professor at Dartmouth.

Domosh was the president of the American Association of Geographers from 2014 to 2015. Domosh is also on the board of trustees for Clark University, where she holds a six-year term from 2014 to 2020.

== Research ==
Domosh's research is primarily in the subfield of cultural/human geography, with a particular focus on late 19th- and early 20th- century United States-based globalization, as well as feminist geography. Her work is primarily archival-based, and examines historical and sociological phenomena from a geographer's background. In 1994, Domosh and Liz Bondi established Gender, Place & Culture: A Journal of Feminist Geography.

== Bibliography ==
- Invented Cities: The Creation of Landscape in Nineteenth-century New York & Boston. Yale University Press, 1998.
- Putting Women in Place: Feminist Geographers Make Sense of the World. Co-authored by Joni Seager. Guilford Publications, 2001.
- Handbook of Cultural Geography. Co-edited by Kay Anderson, Steve Pile, and Nigel Thrift. Sage, 2003.
- The Human Mosaic: A Cultural Approach to Human Geography. Co-authored by Roderick P. Neumann, Terry G. Jordan-Bychkov, and Patricia L. Price. Macmillan, 2009.
- Contemporary Human Geography: Culture, Globalization, Landscape. Co-authored by Roderick P. Neumann and Patricia L. Price. Macmillan Higher Education, 2014.
- American Commodities in an Age of Empire. Routledge, 2016
