= Sexuality and space =

Field of study in human geography

Sexuality and space is a field of study within human geography. The phrase encompasses all relationships and interactions between human sexuality, space and place, themes studied within cultural geography, i.e., environmental and architectural psychology, urban sociology, gender studies, queer studies, socio-legal studies, planning, housing studies and criminology.

Specific topics which fall into this area are the geographies of LGBT residence, public sex environments, sites of queer resistance, global sexualities, sex tourism, the geographies of prostitution and adult entertainment, use of sexualised locations in the arts, and sexual citizenship. The field is now well represented within academic curricula at the university level, and is beginning to make its influence felt on secondary level education (in both the US and the UK).

== Origins and development ==
The work of sociologists has long been concerned with the relationship between urbanization and sexuality, especially in the form of visible clusters or neighborhoods typified by specific sexual moralities or practices. Identification of 'vice areas' and, latterly, 'gay villages', has been a stock in the trade of urban sociology since at least the time of the Chicago School.

The origins of the term "Sexuality and Space" can be traced back to the early 1990s where usage of the phrase was popularized by two publications. In 1990 what may be described as 'Gay Geography' was presented to a wider audience when an article by Larry Knopp was published in the Geographical Magazine to some controversy. In 1992 Beatriz Colomina's Sexuality and Space (Princeton Papers on Architecture) was released; in which the term is used to elaborate on the symbolism of towers and other structures as Phallic icons. The paper goes on to discuss the sexual psychology of color and other design elements. A review of the papers was released by Elizabeth Wilson in Harvard Design Magazine, Winter/Spring 1997.

Within contemporary geography, studies of sexuality are primarily social and cultural in orientation, though there is also notable engagement with political and economic geography, particularly in work on the rise of queer autonomous spaces, economies and alternative (queer) capitalisms. Much work is informed by politics intended to oppose homophobia and heterosexism, inform sexual health, and promote more inclusive forms of sexual citizenship. Methodologically, much work has been qualitative in orientation, rejecting traditional 'straight' methodologies, yet quantitative methods and GIS have also been utilized to good effect. Work remains predominantly focused on the metropolitan centres of the urban West, but there have been notable studies that focus on rural sexualities and sexualities in the global South.

== Geographies of LGBT ==
Although 'minority' sexuality remains a topic that hardly gets a mention in school geography, it has become an accepted part of many university geography departments and is often taught as part of courses on Social and Cultural Geography. Arguably, the most influential book-publication to position sexuality as an accepted part of geography was Mapping Desire, an edited collection by David Bell and Gill Valentine. Bell and Valentine provide a critical review of the history of geographical works on sexuality and set an agenda for further research. They are especially critical of the earliest sexual geographies written during the 1970s and 1980s in the UK and North America. In contrast to the 'dots on maps' approach of the 1970s and 1980s, Mapping Desire represents an attempt to map the geographies of homosexuality, transsexuality, bisexuality, sadomasochism and butch-femme lesbian identities. This represented an important landmark in geographers' engagement with, and development of, queer theory. Subsequent research has developed this work, with an increasing focus on transnational LGBT activism; the intersections of nationhood and sexuality and questions of LGBT citizenship and sexual politics at scales from the body to the global.

Ever since the rise of attention to geographies of LGBT in the late 1970s and 1980s, more research has been focused on the relationship between place, space and sexuality. New phenomena and issues are being explored; for example, in Dereka Rushbrook's research, he points out that some of the secondary cities in the US like Portland, Oregon, and Austin, Texas, had seen the gay village in their cities as something that represents the modernness and diversity of their cites; furthermore, transsexual and third gender, so called the Kathoey in Thailand are worldwide famous for their dance performances and considered a must-see while visiting Thailand.

On the other side, the potential consumption of the LGBTQ+ group and cities are starting to target the group which creates the phenomenon called pink tourism or LGBTQ+ tourism where providing safe yet non-discriminate services and facilities like pubs and saunas which target LGBTQ+ people. Even more, the increasing legalization of same sex marriage in some Western countries has had a significant impact on tourism and movement, despite the possibility of same sex marriage having limited legal power in their home countries.

As Robert Aldrich said in the article "Homosexuality and the City: An Historical Overview", there is an inseparable relationship between land and people, where people are constantly shaping the landscape. For example, one of the schools in Thailand offered to build a third gender bathroom so transsexual students can avoid being forced to choose between the male or female bathroom. The relationship between sexuality and space is not independent of other areas of geography; often, there are other aspects associated with those issues and phenomena like cultural geography and political geography. In terms of cultural geography, bars have played a large role in connecting the land to the LGBTQ community, but also separating those communities. Separatism in the lesbian and male gay communities is a theory of why these communities separated and how bars played a role in that separation. Bars and queer spaces have a connection to each other. In 2012, further concern was made toward the LGBT community and retirement home in British Columbia, Canada. The Vancouver man "Alex Sangha is determined to make sure elderly LGBT people have a comfortable place to spend their twilight years" by building retirement homes for LGBT community where Montreal, Quebec, Canada, has already had one operating as well as a few in the United States.

== Heterosexual geographies ==
Research on Sexualities and Space has widened over time to encompass studies not just of LGBT populations but also the geographies and spaces of heterosexualities. This has included, inter alia, consideration of the impacts of sexuality on the visibilities of commercial sex; the design and consumption of housing; spaces of sex education; the sexualisation of leisure and retail spaces; landscapes of sex tourism; spaces of love, caring and intimacy. This has brought geographies of sexuality into dialogue with gender geography by showing that sexual norms reproduce particular ideas of masculinity and femininity.

== Spiritual spaces of LGBTQI ==
Members of non-heterosexual communities may lose the ability to worship or practice religion within the most widespread religious organizations because they are not accepted as a consequence of their sexuality. Therefore, other spiritual spaces are created, known in many cases as "Queer spiritual spaces", that can vary from sacred buildings or locations that can be "queered" to natural environments or cultural practices in themselves. This kind of behavior leads to the general population believing that LGBTQI (Lesbian, Gay, Bisexual, Transgender, Queer and Intersex) communities are largely atheist or agnostic, but instead some are just adopting non-Abrahamic faiths with pre-Christian traditions and customs, that are based on aspirational encouragement and personal well-being.

The other option to creating these Queer spiritual spaces is taking part in the "queering" of religions, a movement which allows people to still practice their traditional religions but within a space that is tolerant of their sexual choices. This forms a new way of cultural engagement and opens up religious groups to people who would otherwise be outcasts. This option is becoming more and more popular and therefore queer churches have become an alternative for the LGBTQI communities around the world.

Alternate religions/spiritual organizations have been created as well, such as the Lesbian stem of Separatist feminism that managed to give a voice to a portion of the community that was ostracized, and also had the power to give a foundation or reasoning for the differences they encountered with heterosexual society.

== Geographies of sex commerce ==
Research on the location of vice and prostitution have long been associated with the study of sexuality and space. Pioneering – if controversial – in this area was Symanski's (1988) Immoral Landscape; subsequent studies have considered the socio-legal regulation of spaces of prostitution, adult entertainment, sex shops and hostess bars, and sought to place such issues in a wider theoretical context relating to the reproduction of heteronormality. Much work, however, ignores male sex work and forms of intersex and trans-work, whilst other work continues to focus solely on the relationship between locations of sex working and the distribution of sexual infection, including HIV. Studies such as Risk Assessment of Long-Haul Truck Drivers by the University of Alabama at Birmingham, active since April 2007, may also be related to this field of study as the statistics gathered will represent sampling of sexual behaviour in a controlled population of a subgroup.

== Criticisms and conflicts ==
There have been several critiques of the field, and conflicts within the discipline. Studies of sexuality and space has been criticized for universalizing a Western-centric position that has minimal relevance beyond the urbanized Western world. These ideas of sexuality constitute a new homonormativity, which typically privileges white, middle-class males, to the exclusion of trans people, the lower class, and people of colour. Institutions meant to create non-heteronormative spaces, such as the Gay Games, are only accessible to those who are able to afford registration fees, airfare and training, and remain predominantly white. Gender differences are also erased in adopting a "queer" identity. Some assert that by foregoing the gendered term "lesbian" for "queer", women are left unrecognized by such a universalizing signifier – like when women are incorporated under "mankind". Thus, while progress is made on challenging heteronormativity, queer studies have been criticized for potentially reinforcing other forms of marginalization.

Early work on lesbian and gay geographies throughout the 1990s was done by academics working in American universities, and focused almost exclusively on the lives of those in the global North. This is problematic as the queer identity is sometimes used as a global, all-encompassing identity for the LGBT community, thus imposing Western notions of sexuality on all other cultures. Such ideas include unchallenged assumptions as to the nature of "gay rights", and what proper liberation looks like. As a result, certain cultures are labelled "forward" or "backward" based on a Western conception of the queer identity, and the cultural nuances and diversity of other sexualities are left unrecognized.

Conflicts within studies of sexuality and space also exist. One such conflict is between "assimilationist" and "liberationist" perspectives on LGBT spaces. Toronto's gay village is a site of such conflict. Assimilationists are against the creation of a "gay ghetto" in Toronto, advocating instead for the integration of LGBT people into suburbs, to show that they are just like everybody else. Liberationists see the gay village as too commercial to develop the radical, activist community they see as necessary for LGBT rights. As such, Toronto's gay village is not simply a homogenous space for sexual dissidents, but is an unfixed and contested space.

== Organizations ==
Within the discipline of geography, initial scepticism and even opposition to research on sexuality has given way to recognition that geographies of sexuality offer an important perspective on the relationship between people and place (albeit that some continue to regard the area as of marginal importance). The following academic organizations are devoted to the study of sexuality and space.

- Sexuality and Space Speciality Group of the AAG, University of Leeds, United Kingdom
- Sexuality, Space and Queer Research Group of the Royal Geographical Society, UK

== Introductory readings and key texts ==
- Bell, D. and G. Valentine, Eds. (1995). Mapping Desire: geographies of sexualities. London, Routledge.
- Binnie, J. (2004). The Globalization of Sexuality. London, Sage.
- Binnie, J. and Valentine, G. (1999). "Geographies of sexuality - a review of progress " Progress in Human Geography 23(2): 175–187.
- Blidon, M. (2008). "Jalons pour une géographie des homosexualités." Espace geographique 2(37): 175–189.
- Brown, G., Lim, J and Browne, K. (2007). Introduction, or Why Have a Book on Geographies of Sexualities? Geographies of Sexualities. K. Browne, Lim, J. and Brown, G. London Ashgate.
- Brown, M. a. K., L. (2002 ). We're Here! We're Queer! We're Over There, Too! Queer Cultural Geographies Handbook of Cultural Geography. K. Anderson, Domosh, M., Pile, S. and Thrift, N. . London, Sage.
- Greyling, M. (1995). "Inventing Queer Place: Social space and the urban environment as factors in the writing of gay, lesbian and transgender histories" http://www.marcgreyling.com/queer/
- Hubbard, P. (2008). "Here, there, everywhere: the ubiquitous geographies of heteronormativity Geography Compass. https://dspace.lboro.ac.uk/dspace-jspui/handle/2134/4408
- Hubbard, P. (2011) Cities and Sexualities. London, Routledge.
- Johnston, L. and R. Longhurst (2010). Space, place and sex: geographies of sexualities. Lanham, MA, Rowman and Littlefield.
- Kitchin, R. (2002). "Sexing the city: The sexual production of non-heterosexual space in Belfast, Manchester and San Francisco " City 6(2): 205–218.
- Knopp, L. (2007). From lesbian to gay to queer geographies: Pasts, prospects and possibilities. . Geographies of sexualities: Theory practices and politics G. L. Brown, J. and Browne, K. Chichester, Ashgate.
- L. Munuera, Ivan. "An Organism of Hedonistic Pleasures: The Palladium." Log, 41. Fall 2017
- Oswin, N. (2008). "Critical geographies and the uses of sexuality: deconstructing queer space." Progress in Human Geography 32(1): 89–103.
- Perreau, B. (2008). "Introduction:sur la champ in/discipliner la sexualite." EchoGeo 5(July/August).
