= Stephen Rice (academic) =

Stephen P. Rice is a geographer and academic. Since 2011, he has been Professor of River Science at Loughborough University.

== Education and career ==
Rice holds a PhD from the University of British Columbia. In 1995, he was appointed Lecturer in Physical Geography at the University of Loughborough. After promotions to Senior Lecturer and Reader, he was appointed Professor of River Science in 2011. Between 2016 and 2018, he was also Head of Loughborough's Department of Geography and Environment, and since 2018 he has been Associate Dean for Research in the School of Social Sciences.

== Publications ==
- (Co-authored with Lynne E. Frostick, R. E. Thomas, M. F. Johnson, and S. J. McLelland) Users Guide to Ecohydraulic Modelling and Experimentation (CRC Press, 2014).
- (Co-edited with Nick Clifford, Sarah L. Holloway, and Gill Valentine) Key Concepts in Human Geography (Sage, 2009).
- (Co-edited with André G. Roy and Bruce L. Rhoads) River Confluences, Tributaries and the Fluvial Network, (John Wiley & Sons, 2008)..
- (Co-edited with Sarah L. Holloway and Gill Valentine) Key Concepts in Geography (SAGE, 2003).
