= Richard Peet =

British geographer (born 1940)

J. Richard Peet (born 16 April 1940 in Southport, England) is a retired professor of human geography at the Graduate School of Geography at Clark University in Worcester MA, USA. Peet received a BSc (Economics) from the London School of Economics, an M.A. from the University of British Columbia, and moved to the USA in the mid-1960s to complete a PhD in Geography from the University of California, Berkeley. He began teaching at Clark University shortly after completing his PhD from Berkeley, remained there for over 50 years, with secondments in Australia, Sweden and New Zealand. He retired in 2019, when 79 years old.

== Scholarly contributions ==
Professor Peet’s areas of research include Critique of Neo-Liberal Development Theory; Globalization, Global Governance Institutions; Economic Policy, Financial Crisis; Geography of power; Global political ecology; Economic Policy in India; Global political ecology; Consciousness, rationality and ideology; semiotics; and philosophy, theory, geographic though.

Peet’s doctoral research applied von Thunen’s theories to the global expansion of commercial agriculture. However much of his later work was inspired by living in the racially and socially charged situation in America during the 1960s. His early books and articles helped define the field of radical and critical geography. Peet has written extensively on a variety of topics. Along with other authors such as David Harvey he was part of a movement of radical geographers that have drawn on Marxist theory and techniques. He uses the techniques of political economy, looking for interconnections and processes at a variety of scales and over time. Peet believed that geography must do more than simply provide explanations and descriptions of problems studied, but rather attempt to propose alternatives. His political economy focus was critiqued by post-modern and post-capitalist thinkers.

During the 1980s and 1990s Peet's focus shifted to the politics and ecology of international development, particularly the systematic underdevelopment of nations peripheral to the capitalist west. His work is critical of neo-liberal development theory and global governance institutions such as the International Monetary Fund, the World Bank and the World Trade Organization. He was a supporter of the socialist revolution in Grenada, working there prior to the US invasion in 1983.

Peet published what he called his last book, a short one entitled Global Finance Capitalism in 2021.

== Journal editing ==
Peet founded the radical journal of geography, Antipode at Clark University, in 1970 with Ben Wisner and other radical graduate students. It is now one of the top 10 journals in the anglophone world of geography, but until 1978 it was housed in a basement room in the Graduate School of Geography, and until the late 70s, mimeographed from typewritten pages stapled by hand, then distributed by mail to subscribers. Peet was an editor until 1985, when the journal was sold to Blackwell, which later became Wiley. He co-edited Economic Geography from 1992-1998. In 2008 he founded a new independent journal, Human Geography: a new radical journal, published by the independent Institute of Human Geography. As subscriptions picked up, a fund was established to support radical and activist geographical projects worldwide. Human Geography continues to be independently owned by the non-profit Institute of Human Geography and is published by SAGE. Following Peet's original intentions, it continues to fund and support radical and activist geographical projects worldwide.

== Appointments ==
- 1967-1972 Assistant Professor, Clark University, Worcester, Massachusetts
- 1972-1983 Associate Professor, Clark University, Worcester, Massachusetts
- 1983–2019 Professor, Clark University, Worcester, Massachusetts

=== Other appointments ===
- 1978-1980 Senior Research Fellow, Research School of Pacific Studies, Australian National University, Canberra
- 1982-1985 Senior Research Fellow, Beijer Institute, Royal Swedish Academy of Sciences
- 1998 Visiting Professor, University of the Witwatersrand, Johannesburg, South Africa
- 2004 and 2012 Visiting Erskine Fellow, University of Canterbury, Christchurch, New Zealand

== Honours ==
- Lifetime Achievement Award, American Association of Geographers, 2018

== Personal ==
Peet was married twice, latterly to geographer Elaine Hartwick (1962-2022). He had children with her and two sons from his previous marriage. As of 2024, he lives in central Massachusetts.

== Publications ==
=== Books ===
- Global Finance Capitalism. Institute of Human Geography, 2021.
- Global Political Ecology edited with Paul Robbins and Michael Watts, London: Routledge 2010
- India’s New Economic Policy edited by Waquar Ahmed, Amitabh Kundu and Richad Peet, London: Routledge 2010
- Unholy Trinity: The IMF, World Bank and WTO re-written and updated, London: Zed Press, 2009
- Theories of Development: Arguments, Contentions, Alternatives with Elaine Hartwick, New York: Guilford Press 2009
- Geography of Power: The Making of Global Economic Policy, London: Zed Press, 2007.
- Unholy Trinity: The IMF, World Bank, and WTO Zed Press, 2003.
- Theories of Development with Elaine Hartwick, Guilford, 1999, 2002.
- Modern Geographical Thought Blackwell, 1998.
- Liberation Ecologies: Environment, Development, Social Movements (edited with Michael Watts) Routledge, 1996; second revised edition, 2004.
- Global Capitalism: Theories of Societal Development Routledge: 1991.
- New Models in Geography: The Political Economy Approach (2 Volumes) edited with Nigel Thrift. Unwin Hyman, 1989.
- An Introduction to Marxist Theories of Underdevelopment: Papers from the Workshop on Marxist Theories of Underdevelopment, edited. Department of Human Geography, Research School of Pacific Studies, Australian National University, Canberra, A.C.T., Australia, 19–22 November 1979
- International Capitalism and Industrial Restructuring: a critical analysis. Allen & Unwin. 1987.
- Radical Geography: Alternative Viewpoints on Contemporary Social Issues edited. Maaroufa Press, 1977.

=== Articles ===
- "Perverse Expertise and the Social Unconscious in the Making of Crisis". In: Meusburger P., Werlen B., Suarsana L. (eds) Knowledge and Action. Springer, Cham. 89-97. 2017
- "Capital in the 21st century: Economics as usual" Geoforum 65: 301-303 (2015)
- "Comparative Policy Analysis: Introduction" Human Geography 6 (2) (2013): 1-10
- "Contradictions of Finance Capitalism" Monthly Review 63 (2011): 18-32
- “Marxism in the future of Nepal” Republica 2010-01-01. http://www.myrepublica.com/portal/index.php?action=news_details&news_id=13511
- “Making Sense of Globalization” (with E. Hartwick and I Chatterjee), in A Compendium of Economic Geography, London: Sage. ed R Lee, A Leyshon, L McDowell and P. Sunley (2010).
- “Ten Pages that Changed the World: Deconstructing Ricardo” Human Geography 2(1): 81-95(www.hugeog.com)
- “Global Governance”, “Development: Dependency” (with E Hartwick) and “Radical Geography” and “International Organisations” International Encyclopedia of Human Geography Oxford: Elsevier 2009
- “Global Development and Finance Institutions” and “Development Governance” in P.A. O’Hara (ed), International Encyclopedia of Public Policy. Volume 2: Economic Policy, GPERU: Perth, 2009: 139-151 and 299-309. http://pohara.homestead.com/Encyclopedia/Volume-2.pdf
- “Madness and Civilization: Global Financial Capitalism and the Anti-Poverty Discourse” Human Geography, 1, 1 (2008): 82-91 (www.hugeog.com)
- "Deconstructing Free Trade: From Epistemic Communities to Ideological Communities in Struggle” Transactions Institute of British Geographers 32 (2007): 576-580
- Review Article “Nepal's Geography of Underdevelopment” Monthly Review 2007. 59(6): 52-58
- “Imaginarios de Desenvolvimento” in B. Mancano Fernandes, M. Inez Medeiros Marques and J. C. Suzuki, Geografia Agraria: Teoria e Poder São Paulo: Editora Expressao Popular 2007. pp. 19–37
- "Neoliberalism and Nature: The Case of the WTO"(with E. Hartwick), Annals of the Academy of Social and Behavioral Sciences, 2003.
- "Ideology, Discourse and the Geography of Hegemony: From Socialist to Neoliberal Development in Post-Apartheid South Africa" Antipode 2003. 34:54-84.
- "Neoliberalism in South Africa" Globalization, the Third World State and Poverty Alleviation in the Twenty-First Century, ed B. Ikubolajeh Logan. London: Ashgate, 2002.
- "Poststructural Thought Policing" (with Elaine Hartwick) Economic Geography, 78,1 (2002), 87-88.
- "There is such a thing as Culture" Antipode 34,2 (2002).
- "Neoliberalism or Democratic Development?" Review of International Political Economy (2001), 329-343.
- "La Dialectique Spatiale, la geographie Nietschenne, et les politiques de la difference" ("Spatial Dialectics, Nietzschean Geography and the Politics of Difference") in G. Benko (ed.) Geographie, Economie, Societé 3,2 (2001), 369-79.
- "Teaching Global Society" Radical Teacher 62 (2001), pp. 8–10.
- "La Production Culturelle de Forms Economiques" in J-F Staszak et al. (eds) Geographies Anglo-Saxonnes Paris: Belin (2001), pp. 90–204.
- "Celebrating Thirty Years of Radical Geography" Environment and Planning A. Vol.27 (2000).
- "Culture, Imaginary and Rationality in Regional Economic Development" Environment and Planning A Vol. 27 (2000), 1215-1234.
- "Les Regions de la Difference, Les Espaces de la nouveaute: Aspects Culturels de la Theorie de la Regulation" ("Regions of Difference, Spaces of the New: Cultural Aspects of Regulation Theory") Geographie, Economie, Societé 1 (1999), 7-24.
- "Culture, Consumption and Experience in Global Capitalism" in Proceedings 23rd Annual Third World Conference 1998.
- "The Cultural Construction of Economic Forms" in Roger Lee and Jane Wills, Geographies of Economies London: Arnold 1997.
- "Social Theory, Postmodernism and the Critique of Development" in G.B. Benko and U. Strohmeyer (Eds) Space and Social Theory Blackwell, 1997.
- "Re-Encountering Development as Discourse", New Political Economy (1997) 2, 2 341-347.
- "Spatial Dialectics, Nietzschean Geography and the Politics of Difference" in G. Benko (Ed.) Espace et Postmodernité Paris: L'Harmattan 1997.
- "The Postmodern Critique of Development" in Anpege: Lugar, Formacao, Socioespacial Mundo São Paulo. 1996 (in Portuguese).
- "The Cultural Production of Economic Rationality in New England" 1996 NESTVAL Proceedings.
- "Discursive Idealism in the ‘Landscape as Text' School" The Professional Geographer 1996.
- "A Sign Taken for History: Daniel Shays Memorial in Petersham, Massachusetts" Annals, Association of American Geographers 86, 1 (1996), 21-43.
- "Discourse, Text, Location Theory" Economic Geography 70, 3 (1994), 297-302.
- "Mapas do Mundo no fim da Historia" ("Maps of the World at the End of History") in Milton Santos et al. (Eds), O Novo Mapa do Mund Fim de Secula E Globalizacao São Paulo, Brazil: 1993, 46-65.
- "Introduction: Development Theory and Environment in an Age of Market Triumphalism"(with Michael Watts), Economic Geography 69, 3 (1993), 227-253.
