= Political Geography (journal) =

Peer-reviewed academic journal

- Discipline: Political geography
- Language: English
- Edited by: Filippo Menga

Publication details
- Former name: Political Geography Quarterly
- History: 1982–present
- Publisher: Elsevier
- Frequency: 8/year
- Impact factor: 4.9 (2024)

Standard abbreviations
- ISO 4: Political Geogr.

Indexing
- ISSN: 0962-6298 (print); 1873-5096 (web)
- LCCN: 92655097
- OCLC no.: 25104907
- Political Geography Quarterly
- ISSN: 0260-9827

Links
- Journal homepage; Online archive (1992–present); Political Geography Quarterly (1981–1991)

Political Geography is a peer-reviewed academic journal published by Elsevier covering all aspects of political geography. Its editor-in-chief is Filippo Menga (University of Bergamo).

According to the Journal Citation Reports, the journal has a 2024 impact factor of 4.9.

== History ==
The journal was established in 1982 as Political Geography Quarterly, obtaining its current title in 1992, when it switched to a bimonthly frequency. Starting in 2019, the journal began publishing eight issues per year.

== Editors-in-Chief ==
Name	Years
Peter J. Taylor	1982-1999
John O’Loughlin	2000-2015
Philip E. Steinberg	2015-2019
Kevin Grove	2020-2023
Filippo Menga	2024-present

== See also ==
- List of geography journals
- List of political science journals
