= Katherine McKittrick =

Canadian feminist and academic

- Born: 1970 (age 55–56); Ontario, Canada
- Education: York University (Ph.D.)
- Occupations: Professor; academic; writer; editor
- Known for: Gender studies, diaspora studies, black studies

Katherine McKittrick (born 1970), is a Canadian professor and academic, writer, and editor. She is a professor in Gender studies at Queen's University. She is an academic and writer whose work focuses on black studies, cultural geography, anti-colonial and diaspora studies, with an emphasis on the ways in which liberation emerges in black creative texts (music, fiction, poetry, visual art). While many scholars have researched the areas of North American, European, Caribbean, and African black geographies, McKittrick was the first scholar to put forth the interdisciplinary possibilities of black and black feminist geography, with an emphasis on embodied, creative and intellectual spaces engendered in the diaspora.

== Biography ==
McKittrick has a Ph.D. in Women’s Studies from York University; she received her degree in 2004. She is a fellow of Royal Society of Canada (College) and a member of American Academy of Arts and Sciences.

Since 2005, she has been Professor in Gender studies at Queen's University, with joint appointments in Cultural Studies and Geography. She is former Editor at Antipode: A Radical Journal of Geography.

== Academic work ==
McKittrick’s work focuses on black feminist thought, cultural geography, black studies, anti-colonial studies, and the arts. McKittrick's writing centers black life—as empirical, experiential, spatial, and analytical processes—while also drawing attention to how black creative texts are expressive of anti-colonial politics. These themes are addressed in her books Demonic Grounds: Black Women and the Cartographies of Struggle (2006). and Dear Science and Other Stories (2021) as well as her edited collection and contributions to the book Sylvia Wynter: On Being Human as Praxis (2013). McKittrick also edited, with Clyde Woods, Black Geographies and the Politics of Place (2007). Her research explores the works of Sylvia Wynter, Toni Morrison, bell hooks, Robbie McCauley, M. NourbeSe Philip, Willie Bester, Nas, Octavia Butler, Jimi Hendrix, Drexciya, Édouard Glissant, and Dionne Brand.

== Publications ==
=== Books ===
- Dear Science and Other Stories. Duke University Press 2021.
- Demonic Grounds: Black Women and the Cartographies of Struggle. University of Minnesota Press, 2006.

=== Edited volumes ===
- Sylvia Wynter: On Being Human as Praxis. Duke University Press, 2015 (Editor and Contributor)
- Black Geographies and the Politics of Place. Edited with Clyde Woods. Between the Lines Press & South End Press, 2007.

=== Articles ===
- Katherine McKittrick, Frances H. O'Shaunghnessy, Kendall Witaszek, "Rhythm, or On Sylvia Wynter's Science of the Word," American Quarterly, 70:4 (December, 2018): 867-874.
- Katherine McKittrick and Alexander G. Weheliye, “808s & Heartbreak,” Propter Nos, 2:1, (2017): 13-42.
- Katherine McKittrick, “Worn Out,” Southeastern Geographer, 57:1, (2017): 96-100.
- "Rebellion/Invention/Groove." Small Axe 49 (March 2016): 79–91.
- "Wait Canada Anticipate Black". CLR James Journal, 20:1 (Fall 2014): 243–249.
- "Mathematics Black Life", The Black Scholar, 44:2 (Summer 2014): 16–28.
- Katherine McKittrick, "Fantastic Still Life: On Richard Iton (A Working Paper)", in Contemporary Political Theory (February 2015): 24–32.
- "Plantation Futures", Small Axe: A Caribbean Platform for Criticism, 3 42 (November 2013): 1–15.
- "On Plantations, Prisons, and a Black Sense of Place", Journal of Social and Cultural Geography, 12:8 (2011): 947–963.
- "Science Quarrels Sculpture: The Politics of Reading Sarah Baartman", Mosaic: A Journal for the Interdisciplinary Study of Literature—A Special Issue: Sculpture, 43:2 (June 2010): 113–130.
- In conversation with Carole Boyce Davies, "Intellectual Life: Carole Boyce Davies’s Left of Karl Marx: The Political Life of Black Communist Claudia Jones", MaComere: The Journal of the Association of Caribbean Writers and Scholars (April 2008): 27–42.
- "I Entered the Lists…Diaspora Catalogues: The List, The Unbearable Territory, and Tormented Chronologies—Three Narratives and a Weltanschauung", XCP: Cross Cultural Poetics, 17 (2007): 7–29.
- "Their Blood is There, and They Can’t Throw it Out': Honouring Black Canadian Geographies", Topia: Canadian Journal of Cultural Studies, 7 (2002): 27–37.
- "'Who Do You Talk To, When a Body’s in Trouble?': M. Nourbese Philip’s UnSilencing of Black Bodies in the Diaspora", Social and Cultural Geography, 1:2 (2000a): 223–236.
- "'Black and ‘Cause I’m Black I'm Blue': Transverse Racial Geographies in Toni Morrison's The Bluest Eye", Gender, Place and Culture, 7:2 (2000b): 125–142.

=== Book chapters ===
- "Yours in the Intellectual Struggle", in Katherine McKittrick, ed. Sylvia Wynter: On Being Human as Praxis, Duke University Press, 2015: 1–8.
- Sylvia Wynter and Katherine McKittrick, "Unparalleled Catastrophe for Our Species? Or, To Give Humanness a Different Future: Conversations," in Katherine McKittrick, ed., Sylvia Wynter: On Being Human as Praxis, Duke University Press, 2015: 9–89.
- Katherine McKittrick. "Axis: Bold as Love: On Sylvia Wynter, Jimi Hendrix, and the Promise of Science" in Katherine McKittrick, ed. Sylvia Wynter: On Being Human as Praxis. Duke University Press, 2015: 142–163.
- With Clyde Woods, "Introduction: No One Knows the Mysteries at the Bottom of The Ocean", in Katherine McKittrick and Clyde Woods (eds), Black Geographies and the Politics of Place. Between the Lines Press; South End Press, 2007: 1–13.
- "Freedom is a Secret: The Future Usability of the Underground", in McKittrick and Woods (eds), Black Geographies and the Politics of Place. Between the Lines Press; South End Press, 2007: 97–111.
- "Dancing with Audre Lorde: Positive Obsession, Knowledge, and Some Explosions Inspired by Cathie Dunsford’s The Journey Home/Te Haerenga Kainga", in Karin Meissenberg (ed.), Talkstory—The Art of Listening: Indigenous Poetics and Politics in the Work of Cathie Dunsford. Global Dialogues Press, 2007: 88–104.
