= Feminist geography =

Sub-discipline in human geography

Feminist geography is a sub-discipline of human geography that applies the theories, methods, and critiques of feminism to the study of the human environment, society, and geographical space. Feminist geography emerged in the 1970s, when members of the women's movement called on academia to include women as both producers and subjects of academic work. Feminist geographers aim to incorporate positions of race, class, ability, and sexuality into the study of geography. The discipline was a target for the hoaxes of the grievance studies affair.

== The geography of women ==
The geography of women examines the effects geography has on gender inequality and is theoretically influenced by welfare geography and liberal feminism. Feminist geographers emphasize the various gendered constraints put in place by distance and spatial separation (for instance, spatial considerations can play a role in confining women to certain locations or social spheres). In their book Companion to Feminist Geography, Seager and Johnson argue that gender is only a narrow-minded approach to understanding the oppression of women throughout the decades of colonial history. As such, understanding the geography of women requires a critical approach to questions of the dimensions of age, class, ethnicity, orientation and other socio-economic factors. An early objection to the concept of geography of women, however, claimed that gender roles were mainly explained through gender inequality. However, Foord and Gregson argue that the idea of gender roles emerges from a static social theory that narrows the focus to women and portrays women as victims, which gives a narrow reading of distance. Instead, they claim that the concept of the geography of women is able to display how spatial constraint and separation enter into the construction of women's positions. In 2004, theorist Edward Said critiqued the idea of geographical spaces in such a context where actions on gendered practices of representation are fabricated through dominant ideological beliefs. In response, feminist geographers argue that misrepresentations of gender roles and taken-for-granted feminist movements reveal that the challenges of the colonial present lie within the confinement of women to limited spatial opportunities. Therefore, feminist geographies are built on the principle that gender should be applied and developed in terms of space.

== Socialist feminist geography ==
Socialist feminist geography, theoretically influenced by Marxism and Socialist feminism, seeks to explain inequality, the relationship between capitalism and patriarchy, and the interdependence of geography, gender relations, and economic development under capitalism. Socialist feminist geography revolves around questions of how to reduce the gender inequality caused by patriarchy and capitalism, and focuses predominantly on spatial separation, gender place, and locality. Uncertainty regarding appropriate articulation of gender and class analysis fuels a key theoretical debate within the field of socialist feminist geography. For example, when analyzing married mainland Chinese immigrant women living in New York City, women remain the primary object of analysis, and gender remains the primary social relation. However, socialist feminist geographers also recognize that many other factors, such as class, affect women's post-migration experiences and circumstances.

Socialist feminist geographers first worked primarily at the urban scale: Anglo-American feminist geographers focused on the social and spatial separation of suburban homes from paid employment. This was seen as vital to the day-to-day and generational development and maintenance of traditional gender relations in capitalist societies.

Socialist feminist geographers also analyze the ways in which the effects of geographical differences on gender relations not only reflect, but also partly determine local economic changes. Judith Butler's concept of "citationality" explores the lack of agency surrounding the facilitation of the presence of women within the discipline of geography. Subsequently, feminist geographers conclude that whenever performative measures are taken to diminish women's rights in geographical space, surrounding conventions adapt to make it seem as the norm. For instance, Susan Hanson and Geraldine Pratt's book "Gender, Work, and Space" reveals how geographical elements, such as the configuration of workplaces, the distribution of resources, and the design of urban and rural environments, contribute to shaping and reinforcing gender disparities within the realm of work.

== Feminist geographies of difference ==
Feminist geographies of difference is an approach to feminist geography that concentrates on the construction of gendered identities and differences among women. It examines gender and constructions of nature through cultural, post-structural, postcolonial and psychoanalytic theories, as well as writings by women of color, lesbian women, gay men, and women from third world countries. In this approach, feminist geographers emphasize the study of micro-geographies of body, mobile identities, distance, separation and place, imagined geographies, colonialism and post-colonialism, and environment or nature.

Since the late 1980s, many feminist geographers have moved on to three new research areas: categories of gender between men and women, the formation of gender relations and identities, and the differences between relativism and situational knowledge.

Firstly, feminist geographers have contested and expanded the categories of genders between men and women. Through this, they have also begun to investigate differences in the constructions of gender relations across race, ethnicity, age, religion, sexuality and nationality, paying particular attention to women who are positioned along multiple axes of difference.

Secondly, to gain a better understanding of how gender relations and identities are formed and assumed, feminist geographers have drawn upon a broader extent of social theory and culture. Building upon this theoretical platform, feminist geographers are more able to discuss and debate the influence that post-structuralist and psychoanalytic theories have on multiple identifications.

Lastly, the difference between relativism and situated knowledge is a key area of discussion. Through these discussions, feminist geographers have discovered ways to reconcile partial perspectives with a commitment to political action and social change.

== Critical human geography ==
Critical human geography is defined as "a diverse and rapidly changing set of ideas and practices within human geography linked by a shared commitment to emancipatory politics within and beyond the discipline, to the promotion of progressive social change and to the development of a broad range of critical theories and their application in geographical research and political practice."

Critical human geography emerged from the field of Anglophonic geography in the mid-1990s, and it presents a broad alliance of progressive approaches to the discipline. Critical human geographers focus on key publications that mark different eras of critical human geography, drawing upon anarchism, anti-colonialism, critical race theory, environmentalism, feminism, Marxism, nonrepresentational theory, post-Marxism, post-colonialism, post-structuralism, psychoanalysis, queer theory, situationism, and socialism.

Critical human geography is understood as being multiple, dynamic, and contested.

Rather than a specific sub-discipline of geography, feminist geography is often considered part of a broader, postmodern, critical theory approach, that draws upon the theories of Michel Foucault, Jacques Derrida, and Judith Butler, and many post-colonial theorists. Feminist geographers often focus on the lived experiences of individuals and groups in the geographies of their own localities, rather than theoretical development without empirical work.

Many feminist geographers study the same subjects as other geographers, but focus specifically on gender divisions. This has developed into concerns with wider issues of gender, family, sexuality, race, and class. Examples of areas of focus include:

- Geographic differences in gender relations and gender equality
- The geography of women (e.g. spatial constraints and welfare geography)
- The construction of gender identity through the use and nature of spaces and places
- Geographies of sexuality (queer theory)
- Geographies of disability
- Children's geographies or the 'Geographies of children, youth and families'

Feminist geographers are also deeply impacted by and respondent to contemporary globalization and neoliberal discourses that are manifested transnationally and translocally.

Feminist geography also critiques human geography and other academic disciplines, arguing that academic structures have been traditionally characterized by a patriarchal perspective and that contemporary studies which do not confront the nature of previous work reinforce the masculine bias of academic study. British geographer Gillian Rose's Feminism and Geography is one such sustained criticism that claims that the approach to human geography in Britain is historically masculinist. This geographic masculinization includes traditions of writing landscapes as feminine spaces—and thus as subordinate to male geographers—and subsequent assumptions of a separation between mind and body. Johnston & Sidaway describe such separation as "Cartesian dualism" and further explain its influence on geography:

"'Cartesian dualism underlines our thinking in a myriad of ways, not least in the divergence of the social sciences from the natural sciences, and in a geography which is based on the separation of people from their environments. Thus while geography is unusual in its spanning of the natural and social sciences and in focusing on the interrelations between people and their environments, it is still assumed that the two are distinct and one acts on the other. Geography, like all of the social sciences, has been built upon a particular conception of mind and body which sees them as separate, apart and acting on each other (Johnston, 1989, cited in Longhurst, 1997, p. 492)' Thus, too, feminist work has sought to transform approaches to the study of landscape by relating it to the way that it is represented ('appreciated' so to speak), in ways that are analogous to the heterosexual male gaze directed towards the female body (Nash 1996). Both of these concerns (and others)- about the body as a contested site and for the Cartesian distinction between mind and body - have been challenged in postmodern and poststructuralist feminist geographies."

Other feminist geographers have interrogated how the discipline of geography itself represents and reproduces the heterosexual male gaze. Feminist geographers such as Katherine McKittrick have asserted that how we see and understand space are fundamentally bound up in how we understand the hegemonic presence of the white male subject in history, geography and in the materiality of everyday space. Building off of Sylvia Wynter's theories of the racialized production of public and private space, McKittrick challenges "social landscapes that presume subaltern populations have no relationship to the production of space" and writes to document black female geographies in order to "allow us to engage with a narrative that locates and draws on black histories and black subjects in order to make visible social lives which are often displaced, rendered ungeographic." McKittrick stakes claim in the co-articulation of race and gender as they articulate space, writing: "I am emphasizing here that racism and sexism are not simply bodily or identity-based; racism and sexism are also spatial acts and illustrate black women's geographic experiences and knowledges as they are made possible through domination." Moreover, many feminist geographers have critiqued human geography for centering masculine knowledge emphasizing "objective" knowledge, arguing instead for the use of situated knowledge which understands both observation and analysis as being rooted in partial objectivity.

== Challenges of feminist geography ==
Linda McDowell and Joanne P. Sharp, both foundational feminist geographers and scholars, describe the struggle of gaining recognition in academia, saying that "[it has been] a long struggle to gain recognition within geography as a discipline that gender relations are a central organizing feature both of the material and symbolic worlds and of the theoretical basis of the discipline." Feminist geographers struggle in academia in a variety of ways. Firstly, ideas that originate from feminist discourse are often seen as commonsense once the wider field accepts them, thereby rendering geography that is explicitly feminist invisible. Furthermore, feminist geography is understood to be the only subfield of geography where gender is explicitly addressed, permitting the wider discipline to disengage from feminist challenges. Finally, within the field, some geographers believe that feminist practice has been fully integrated into the academy, making feminist geography obsolete.

Challenges of feminist geography are also embedded in the subfield itself. The epistemology of feminist geography argues that the positionalities and lived experiences of the geographers are as central to scholarship as what is being researched. In this way, feminist geographers must maintain diverse identities to fully engage with the discipline. Linda Peake and Gill Valentine point out that, while feminist geography has addressed gender issues in more than twenty-five countries across the world, scholarship in the field of feminist geography is primarily conducted by white female scholars from institutions in the Global North. In this way, feminist geography faces not only barriers rooted in the academy but a lack of diversity in its own field.

Feminist geographers draw upon a broad range of social and cultural theory, including psychoanalysis and post-structuralism, to develop a fuller understanding of how gender relations and identities are shaped and assumed. This has led to the fundamental rethinking of gender and the contradictions and possibilities presented by the seeming instability and insistent repetitions of gender norms in practice. The focus on multiple identifications and the influence of post-structuralist and psychoanalytic theories has allowed feminist geographers to enter into dialogue with other strands of critical geography. This open dialogue, however, has also allowed tensions to build between geographers in the United States and geographers in Great Britain. Theoretical differences among feminist geographers are more obvious than in the past, but since 1994, the national differences between America and British geographers have begun to diminish as both parties pursue new directions.

== Scholarly publishing hoax ==
In 2018, a leading journal in feminist geography entitled Gender, Place and Culture was subject to a scholarly publishing hoax known as the Grievance studies affair. James A. Lindsay, Peter Boghossian and Helen Pluckrose disingenuously submitted a paper titled "Human Reactions to Rape Culture and Queer Performativity in Urban Dog Parks in Portland, Oregon." The paper proposed that dog parks are "rape-condoning spaces", and a place of rampant canine rape culture and systemic oppression against "the oppressed dog" through which human attitudes to both problems can be measured and analyzed by applying black feminist criminology. The paper suggested that this could provide insight into training men out of sexual violence and bigotry. The paper has since been retracted. The hoax has been criticized as unethical and mean-spirited, as well as race-baiting and misogynist and critics of the hoax have suggested that the hoaxers misrepresented the process of peer review.

== Notable feminist geographers ==
- Mona Domosh
- Rosalyn Deutsche
- Samantha Fletcher
- Susan Hanson
- Dolores Hayden
- Sarah Holloway
- Cindi Katz
- Doreen Massey
- Linda McDowell
- Gillian Rose
- Evelyn Stokes
- Gill Valentine
- Rachel Pain

== See also ==
- History of geography
- Category:Women geographers
- Critical geography
- Cultural geography
