= Progress in Physical Geography =

- Discipline: Geography
- Language: English
- Edited by: Nicholas Clifford

Publication details
- Former name: Supersedes in part (in 1977): Progress in Geography (United Kingdom) (0556-1892)
- History: 1977-present
- Publisher: SAGE Publications
- Frequency: Bi-monthly
- Impact factor: 3.375 (2016)

Standard abbreviations
- ISO 4: Prog. Phys. Geogr.

Indexing
- CODEN: PPGEEC
- ISSN: 0309-1333 (print); 1477-0296 (web)
- LCCN: 78642543
- OCLC no.: 243419000

Links
- Journal homepage; Online access; Online archive

Progress in Physical Geography is a peer-reviewed academic journal that publishes papers in the fields of Geosciences, multidisciplinary and physical geography. The journal's editors are Nicholas Clifford (King's College London) and George Malanson (University of Iowa). It has been in publication since 1977 and is currently published by SAGE Publications.

== Scope ==
Progress In Physical Geography is an international, interdisciplinary journal which publishes papers that focus on developments and debates within Physical Geography. The bi-monthly published journal which is edited by Nicholas Clifford and George Malanson also covers interrelated fields across the Earth, Biological and Ecological System Sciences.

== Abstracting and indexing ==
Progress in Physical Geography is abstracted and indexed in, among other databases: SCOPUS, and the Social Sciences Citation Index. According to the Journal Citation Reports, its 2016 impact factor is 3.375, ranking it 35 out of 188 journals in the category ‘Geosciences, Multidisciplinary’. and 11 out of 49 journals in the category ‘Geography, Physical’.
