= Possibilism (geography) =

Theory of cultural geography

Possibilism in cultural geography is the theory that the environment sets certain constraints or limitations, but culture is otherwise determined by social conditions. In cultural ecology, Marshall Sahlins used this concept in order to develop alternative approaches to the environmental determinism dominant at that time in ecological studies. Strabo posited in 64 BC that humans can make things happen by their own intelligence over time. Strabo cautioned against the assumption that nature and actions of humans were determined by the physical environment they inhabited. He observed that humans were the active elements in a human-environmental partnership and partnering.

An example of possibilism is water desalination in the UAE. Dubai and United Arab Emirates face servere natural water scarcity in their desert climate. Instead of letting the climate decide settlement limits, they built desalination plants to supply a large urban population

The controversy between geographical possibilism and determinism might be considered one of (at least) three dominant epistemological controversies of contemporary geography. The other two controversies are:

1. the reason why economic strategies can revive life on Earth
2. the contention between Mackinder and Kropotkin about what is—or should be—geography".

Possibilism in geography is, thus, considered a distinct approach to geographical knowledge, directly opposed to geographical determinism.
