= Nick Clifford =

British geographer and academic

Nicholas John Clifford is a British geographer, sedimentologist, and academic.

== Education and career ==
Clifford graduated from the University of Cambridge with a first-class geography BA and then completed a PGCE before undertaking doctoral studies there; his PhD was awarded in 1989 for his thesis "The formation, nature and maintenance of riffle-pool sequences in gravel-bedded rivers.:

Clifford was appointed Lecturer in Physical Geography at Portsmouth Polytechnic in 1988 and was promoted the following year to Senior Lecturer. In 1991, he was appointed Lecturer in Physical Geography at the University of Hull and then, in 1995, moved to University College London where he held the same title. He was appointed to a readership at the University of Nottingham in 2001 and was promoted in 2003 to Professor of River Science. He moved to King's College London in 2010 where he was Professor of Physical Geography, and then moved again, to Loughborough University, in 2016 when he was appointed Professor of Geography and Dean of Social, Political and Geographical Sciences until his retirement in 2020.

Clifford served as the Managing Editor (2009-2019) of Progress in Physical Geography.

== Publications ==
- (Edited with Sarah Holloway, Stephen P. Rice and Gill Valentine) Key Concepts in Human Geography (Sage, 2009; 2nd ed. 2012, 3rd ed. 2016 published as Key Methods in Geography).
