= Sarah Holloway =

Geographer

Sarah Louise Holloway, FAcSS, is a British geographer and academic. Since 2010, she has been Professor of Human Geography at Loughborough University.

== Education and career ==
Holloway carried out her doctoral studies at the University of Sheffield; her PhD was awarded in 1996 for her thesis "Space, place and geographies of childcare". In 1994, she was appointed to a lectureship at Loughborough University and was eventually promoted to Reader in Human Geography. In 2010, she was appointed Professor of Human Geography at Loughborough.

In 2013, Holloway was elected a Fellow of the Academy of Social Sciences.

== Publications ==
- (Co-authored with Nina Laurie, Claire Dwyer and Fiona M. Smith) Geographies of New Femininities (Longman, 1999).
- (Edited with Gill Valentine) Children's Geographies: Playing, Living, Learning (Routledge, 2000).
- (Co-authored with Gill Valentine) Cyberkids: Children in the Information Age (Routledge, 2003).
- (Edited with Stephen P. Rice and Gill Valentine) Key Concepts in Geography (Sage, 2003).
- (Co-authored with Gill Valentine, Mark Jayne and Charlotte A. Knell) Drinking Places: Where People Drink and Why (Joseph Rowntree Foundation, 2007).
- (Edited with Nick Clifford, Stephen P. Rice and Gill Valentine) Key Concepts in Human Geography (Sage, 2009).
- (Edited with Mark Jayne and Gill Valentine) Alcohol, Drinking and Drunkenness: (Dis)Orderly Spaces (Ashgate, 2011).
