= Gillian Rose (geographer) =

British geographer

Gillian Rose FBA (born 1962) is a British geographer and geographic author. She is a professor of human geography in the School of Geography and the Environment at the University of Oxford. Previously, she taught and served as associate dean at The Open University. She is best known for her 1993 book, Feminism & Geography: The Limits of Geographical Knowledge.

== Education and early career ==
Rose earned her BA from the University of Cambridge and her PhD (1990) from the University of London. She also has taught at the University of London and University of Edinburgh. Before joining the faculty of the School of Geography and the Environment at the University of Oxford in 2017, she previously taught and served as Associate Dean (Research) in the Faculty of Social Sciences at The Open University and was also Head of the Geography Department there for four years.

== Scholarly contributions ==
"I think one of geography's greatest strengths-- one if its greatest pleasures-- as a discipline, is the way that it gathers together very different talents and skills, and puts them to work together in the task of understanding the world we all share."-- Professor Gillian Rose's acceptance speech from the 2012 Royal Geographical Society Medals and Awards ceremony.

Rose's current research interests lie broadly within the field of visual culture. She is interested in the ways social subjectivities and relations are pictured or made invisible in a range of media, and how those processes are embedded in power relations. She also has long-standing interest in feminist film theory and in Michel Foucault's and feminist accounts of photography in particular. This work has formed a crucial link between feminist geography and geography of media and communication.

Written from a Marxist and radical feminist perspective, Feminism & Geography (1993) stimulated a series of debates within geography about the nature of how geographic knowledge is constructed. Rose is known for defining identity as "how we make sense of ourselves" and explained how we each have different identities on different scales, for example, someone's local identity is probably different from their global identity. She also describes sense of place as the process of infusing a place with "meaning and feeling."

In recent years, she has written three books that have proven less controversial: Visual Methodologies: An Introduction to Interpreting Visual Materials (2001), Deterritorialisations: Revisioning Landscape and Politics (2003), and Doing Family Photography: The Domestic, The Public and The Politics of Sentiment (Ashgate, 2012).

== Key publications ==
- Rose, G. (1993), Feminism & Geography: The Limits of Geographical Knowledge, U of Minnesota Press.
- Rose, G. (2001), Visual Methodologies: An Introduction to Interpreting Visual Materials, second edition, Sage.
- Dorrian, M. and Rose, G. (eds) (2003) Deterritoralisations: Revisioning Landscape and Politics, Black Dog Press.
- Rose, G. (2003), 'Just how, exactly, is geography visual?' Antipode, vol. 35, pp. 212–21.
- Rose, G. (2003), 'Domestic spacings and family photography: a case study', Transactions of the Institute of British Geographers, vol. 28, pp. 5–18.
- Rose, G. (2004), 'Everyone's cuddled up and it just looks really nice': the emotional geography of some mums and their family photos', Social and Cultural Geography, vol. 5 pp. 549–64.
- Rose, G. (2005), 'You just have to make a conscious effort to keep snapping away, I think': a case study of family photos, mothering and familial space', in Hardy, S and Wiedmer, C (eds), Motherhood and Space: Configurations of the Maternal Through Politics, Home, and the Body, Palgrave Macmillan, pp. 221–40.
- Rose, G. (2012), Doing Family Photography: The Domestic, The Public and The Politics of Sentiment, Ashgate

== Awards and recognition ==
Rose received the 2012 Murchison Award from the Royal Geographical Society for "publications on visual culture and geographic methodologies". In 2015, she was elected a fellow of the British Academy and, the same year, was also named an Andrew W Mellon Distinguished Visiting Scholar at the University of Pretoria, as well.
