= Joe Painter =

British geographer and academic

Joe Painter FAcSS (born 1965) is a British geographer and academic, specialising in political geography. As of 2023, he is a professor in the Department of Geography at Durham University, part of the Politics-State-Space, IBRU Centre for Borders Research and Urban Worlds research groups.

Painter read geography at the University of Cambridge between 1984 and 1987, achieving a BA (Hons). He then went on to achieve a PhD from the Open University in 1991.

Between 1991 and 1993 he was a geography lecturer at the University of Wales, Lampeter, subsequently moving to Durham University in 1993. During the academic year 2004-05 Painter was on leave at the Australian National University in Canberra, where he was the Visiting Fellow in the Department of Human Geography, Research School of Pacific and Asian Studies (RSPAS).

As of 2023, he has (co-)authored four books about political geography, human geography and the geography of borders and co-edited a further two books.

Painter has also become a member of various organizations and magazines:

- Between 1996/9 he was editor of the magazine Area.
- Since 1997 he has been a member of the International Editorial Advisory Board, Space and Polity and
- Since from 2002 of the Canadian Geographer.

== Areas of expertise ==
- Urban and regional politics and policy
- Regional identity
- Geographies of citizenship and democracy
- Geographies of the state, governance and regulation
- Political geographies of European integration
- Social and political theory
