= Globalization and World Cities Research Network =

United Kingdom-based think tank

- Established: 1998
- Director: Peter J. Taylor
- Location: Loughborough, United Kingdom
- Website: gawc.lboro.ac.uk

The Globalization and World Cities Research Network (GaWC) is a British think tank that studies the relationships between world cities in the context of globalization. It is based in the geography department of Loughborough University in Leicestershire, United Kingdom, founded by Peter J. Taylor in 1998. Together with Jon Beaverstock and Richard G. Smith, they create the GaWC's biennial categorization of world cities into "Alpha", "Beta", and "Gamma" tiers. The three tiers are further divided into subgroupings using plus and minus signs. The categorization is based upon the author's views of "international connectedness", primarily shown through a region's advanced services firms, such as in accountancy, finance, and law.

== GaWC city classification ==
The GaWC examines cities worldwide to narrow them down to a roster of world cities, then ranks these based on their connectivity through four "advanced producer services": accountancy, advertising, banking/finance, and law. The GaWC inventory ranks city economics more heavily than political or cultural factors. Beyond the categories of "Alpha" world cities (with four sub-categories), "Beta" world cities (three sub-categories), and "Gamma" world cities (three sub-categories), the GaWC cities include additional cities at "High sufficiency" and "Sufficiency" level.

GaWC published city classifications in 1998, 2000, 2004, 2008, 2010, 2012, 2016, 2018, 2020, 2022, and 2024. The 2004 rankings added several new indicators while continuing to rank city economics more heavily than political or cultural factors. The 2008 roster, similar to the 1998 version, is sorted into categories of Alpha world cities (with four sub-categories), Beta world cities (three sub-categories), Gamma world cities (three sub-categories), and additional cities with High sufficiency or Sufficiency presence. The list has been prone to change in the ranks. For example, some cities that were selected prior to 2018, such as the United States cities of Greensboro and Providence, are no longer classified in the "sufficiency" level.

== 2024 city classification ==
Top global cities per the GaWC 2024 rankings. Shown are "Alpha ++" cities (marked in gold) and "Alpha +" cities (marked in red).

The classification results for 2020 are derived from the activities of 175 leading firms providing advanced producer services across 802 cities worldwide. The results should be interpreted as indicating the importance of cities as nodes in the world city network (i.e. enabling corporate globalization). (▲1) or (▼1) indicates a city moved one category up or down since the 2022 classification. The cities in the 2024 classification are as follows, listed in alphabetical order per section:

=== Alpha ===
Alpha level cities are linked to major economic states/regions and highly integrated into the world economy. Alpha level cities are classified into four sections: Alpha++, Alpha+, Alpha, and Alpha− cities.

==== Alpha++ ====
Alpha++ cities are cities most integrated with the global economy:

- (United Kingdom) London
- (United States) New York

==== Alpha+ ====
Alpha+ cities are "other highly integrated cities that complement London and New York, largely filling in advanced service needs for the Pacific/Asia [region]":

- (China) Beijing
- (United Arab Emirates) Dubai
- Hong Kong
- (France) Paris
- (China) Shanghai
- Singapore
- (Australia) Sydney (▲1)
- (Japan) Tokyo

==== Alpha ====
Alpha and Alpha− cities are "very important world cities that link major economic regions and states into the world economy":

- (Netherlands) Amsterdam
- (Thailand) Bangkok (▲1)
- (United States) Chicago
- (Germany) Frankfurt
- (China) Guangzhou (▲1)
- (Turkey) Istanbul
- (Indonesia) Jakarta
- (Malaysia) Kuala Lumpur
- (United States) Los Angeles
- (Spain) Madrid
- Mexico City
- (Italy) Milan
- (India) Mumbai
- (Brazil) São Paulo
- (South Korea) Seoul
- (Canada) Toronto
- (Poland) Warsaw

==== Alpha− ====
- (Germany) Berlin
- (United States) Boston
- (Belgium) Brussels (▼1)
- (Argentina) Buenos Aires
- (Republic of Ireland) Dublin
- (Germany) Düsseldorf (▲1)
- (United States) Houston (▲1)
- (South Africa) Johannesburg
- (Portugal) Lisbon
- Luxembourg City (▼1)
- (Australia) Melbourne
- (Germany) Munich
- (India) New Delhi
- (Saudi Arabia) Riyadh
- (United States) San Francisco
- (Chile) Santiago
- (China) Shenzhen
- (Sweden) Stockholm
- (Taiwan) Taipei
- (Austria) Vienna
- (United States) Washington DC
- (Switzerland) Zurich

=== Beta ===
Beta level cities are cities that link moderate economic regions to the world economy and are classified into three sections: Beta+, Beta, and Beta− cities.

==== Beta+ ====
- (Greece) Athens
- (United States) Atlanta
- (New Zealand) Auckland
- (Spain) Barcelona
- (India) Bengaluru (▲1)
- (Colombia) Bogotá (▼1)
- (Romania) Bucharest
- (Hungary) Budapest
- (China) Chengdu
- (United States) Dallas
- (Qatar) Doha
- (Germany) Hamburg
- (China) Hangzhou
- (Vietnam) Ho Chi Minh City (▼1)
- (Peru) Lima
- (United States) Miami
- (Canada) Montreal
- (Czech Republic) Prague (▼1)
- (Italy) Rome
- (China) Tianjin

==== Beta ====
- (United Arab Emirates) Abu Dhabi
- (Australia) Brisbane
- (Egypt) Cairo (▼1)
- (Canada) Calgary (▲1)
- (China) Chongqing
- (Denmark) Copenhagen (▼1)
- (China) Dalian (▲1)
- (Switzerland) Geneva
- (Vietnam) Hanoi (▼1)
- (China) Jinan
- (Ukraine) Kyiv (▼1)
- (Bahrain) Manama
- (Philippines) Manila (▼2)
- (Kenya) Nairobi (▼1)
- (China) Nanjing
- (Norway) Oslo (▲1)
- (Australia) Perth
- (China) Shenyang (▲1)
- (China) Suzhou (▲2)
- (Israel) Tel Aviv (▼2)
- (China) Wuhan (▲1)
- (China) Xiamen (▲1)
- (China) Zhengzhou (▲2)

==== Beta− ====
- (Lebanon) Beirut (▼1)
- (Serbia) Belgrade
- (Slovakia) Bratislava (▼1)
- (Venezuela) Caracas (▼1)
- (Morocco) Casablanca (▼2)
- (China) Changsha
- (India) Chennai (▲1)
- (United States) Denver (▼1)
- (China) Hefei (▲2)
- (Finland) Helsinki (▼1)
- (Pakistan) Karachi (▼1)
- (China) Kunming (▲1)
- (Nigeria) Lagos (▼1)
- (France) Lyon (▲1)
- (United Kingdom) Manchester (▲1)
- (Uruguay) Montevideo (▼2)
- (Cyprus) Nicosia
- Panama City (▼1)
- (United States) Philadelphia
- (Mauritius) Port Louis (▲6)
- (China) Qingdao (▲1)
- (Brazil) Rio de Janeiro (▼1)
- (United States) Seattle (▼1)
- (Bulgaria) Sofia (▼1)
- (Germany) Stuttgart
- (Canada) Vancouver (▼1)
- (China) Xi'an (▲2)
- (Croatia) Zagreb

=== Gamma ===
Gamma level cities are cities that link smaller economic regions into the world economy and are classified into three sections: Gamma+, Gamma, and Gamma− cities.

==== Gamma+ ====
- (Australia) Adelaide (▲1)
- (Kazakhstan) Almaty (▼2)
- (Jordan) Amman
- (Belgium) Antwerp
- (United States) Austin
- (South Africa) Cape Town (▼2)
- (Sri Lanka) Colombo (▲1)
- (Bangladesh) Dhaka (▼2)
- (China) Fuzhou (▲2)
- Guatemala City
- (India) Hyderabad (▲1)
- Kuwait City (▼1)
- (Pakistan) Lahore
- (United States) Minneapolis
- (Portugal) Porto
- (Netherlands) Rotterdam
- (United States) San Diego
- (Dominican Republic) Santo Domingo
- (China) Taiyuan (▲2)
- (Tunisia) Tunis (▼1)

==== Gamma ====
- (India) Ahmedabad (▲2)
- (United Kingdom) Birmingham (▲2)
- (Italy) Bologna (▲3)
- (United Kingdom) Bristol (▲1)
- (United States) Detroit (▼1)
- (China) Haikou (▲1)
- (China) Harbin (▲1)
- (Pakistan) Islamabad
- (Uganda) Kampala
- (Mexico) Monterrey (▼1)
- (Oman) Muscat (▼1)
- (United States) Nashville (▲2)
- (China) Ningbo (▲2)
- (Japan) Osaka
- (Cambodia) Phnom Penh
- (India) Pune (▼1)
- (Ecuador) Quito (▼2)
- (Latvia) Riga (▲1)
- (Costa Rica) San José (▼3)
- (United States) San Jose (▲1)
- (El Salvador) San Salvador
- (United States) Tampa (▲1)
- (Georgia (country)) Tbilisi
- (Honduras) Tegucigalpa (▲2)
- (Albania) Tirana (▲1)

==== Gamma− ====
- (Ghana) Accra (▼2)
- (Azerbaijan) Baku
- (United States) Baltimore (▲1)
- (Spain) Bilbao (▲1)
- (Colombia) Cali (▲2)
- (China) Changchun (▲1)
- (United States) Charlotte
- (United States) Cleveland (▲1)
- (Tanzania) Dar es Salaam (▼2)
- (United Kingdom) Edinburgh
- (Saudi Arabia) Jeddah (▼1)
- (Poland) Katowice (▲2)
- (Malaysia) Labuan (▲2)
- (Slovenia) Ljubljana (▲1)
- (Nicaragua) Managua
- (France) Marseille (▲1)
- (China) Nanchang (▲1)
- (Malaysia) Penang (▲1)
- (United States) Pittsburgh (▲1)
- (Poland) Poznań (▲2)
- (United States) St. Louis (▼2)
- (Indonesia) Surabaya (▲2)
- (Italy) Turin (▲2)
- (Spain) Valencia (▼2)
- (New Zealand) Wellington (▲1)

=== Sufficiency ===
Sufficiency level cities are cities that have a sufficient degree of services so as not to be overly dependent on world cities. This is sorted into high sufficiency cities and sufficiency cities.

==== High sufficiency ====
- (Algeria) Algiers
- (United Kingdom) Belfast
- (United States) Cincinnati (▲1)
- (Senegal) Dakar (▼1)
- (United Kingdom) Glasgow (▲1)
- (Sweden) Gothenburg (▼1)
- (Mexico) Guadalajara
- (Ecuador) Guayaquil
- (Zimbabwe) Harare (▼2)
- (United States) Hartford (▲1)
- (United States) Indianapolis (▲1)
- (Turkey) İzmir (▲1)
- (United States) Kansas City
- (Bolivia) La Paz
- (United Kingdom) Leeds (▲1)
- (Cyprus) Limassol (▲1)
- (Zambia) Lusaka (▼2)
- Macau (▲new)
- (Mozambique) Maputo
- (United States) Phoenix
- (Mexico) Querétaro
- (United States) Raleigh (▲1)
- (China) Shijiazhuang (▲1)
- (North Macedonia) Skopje (▲1)
- (Lithuania) Vilnius (▲1)
- (China) Zhuhai (▲1)

==== Sufficiency ====
- (Denmark) Aarhus
- (United Kingdom) Aberdeen
- (Ivory Coast) Abidjan (▼1)
- (Nigeria) Abuja
- (Egypt) Alexandria
- (Turkey) Ankara (▼1)
- (Kazakhstan) Astana
- (Paraguay) Asunción (▼1)
- (China) Baoding (▲new)
- (Colombia) Barranquilla
- (Switzerland) Basel
- (Brazil) Belo Horizonte
- (Norway) Bergen
- (Switzerland) Bern
- (United States) Birmingham (▲new)
- (Malawi) Blantyre
- (France) Bordeaux
- (Brazil) Brasília (▼1)
- (Brazil) Campinas
- (Australia) Canberra
- (Philippines) Cebu City
- (New Zealand) Christchurch
- (Mexico) Ciudad Juárez
- (Germany) Cologne (▼2)
- (United States) Columbus
- (Argentina) Córdoba
- (Brazil) Curitiba (▼1)
- (United States) Des Moines
- (China) Dongguan (▲new)
- (Cameroon) Douala (▼2)
- (Germany) Dresden
- (South Africa) Durban (▼1)
- (Canada) Edmonton
- (Italy) Florence (▲new)
- (China) Foshan
- (Botswana) Gaborone
- (Italy) Genoa
- (Cayman Islands) George Town
- (China) Guiyang
- (Canada) Halifax
- (Bermuda) Hamilton
- (Germany) Hanover
- (China) Hohhot
- (United States) Jacksonville
- (Malaysia) Johor Bahru
- (Taiwan) Kaohsiung
- (India) Kolkata (▼1)
- (Poland) Kraków (▼1)
- (China) Lanzhou
- (United States) Las Vegas
- (Switzerland) Lausanne
- (Germany) Leipzig
- (Gabon) Libreville
- (Belgium) Liège
- (France) Lille
- (Austria) Linz
- (United Kingdom) Liverpool
- (Poland) Łódź
- (United States) Louisville
- (Angola) Luanda (▼1)
- (Spain) Málaga
- (Sweden) Malmö
- (Germany) Mannheim
- (Colombia) Medellín (▼2)
- (United States) Memphis (▲new)
- (United States) Milwaukee (▼1)
- (Russia) Moscow (▼1)
- (Japan) Nagoya
- (China) Nanning
- (France) Nantes
- (Italy) Naples
- (The Bahamas) Nassau (▼1)
- (United Kingdom) Newcastle upon Tyne
- (France) Nice
- (United Kingdom) Nottingham
- (Germany) Nuremberg
- (United States) Oklahoma City
- (United States) Orlando
- (Canada) Ottawa
- (United States) Palo Alto
- (Montenegro) Podgorica
- (Trinidad and Tobago) Port of Spain
- (United States) Portland
- (Brazil) Porto Alegre
- (Mexico) Puebla
- (Brazil) Recife
- (United States) Richmond
- (United States) Sacramento
- (United States) Salt Lake City
- (Brazil) Salvador (▲new)
- (United States) San Antonio
- (Puerto Rico) San Juan (▼4)
- (Mexico) San Luis Potosí
- (Honduras) San Pedro Sula (▲new)
- (Bolivia) Santa Cruz de la Sierra
- (Bosnia and Herzegovina) Sarajevo
- (Spain) Seville
- (United Kingdom) Southampton
- (France) Strasbourg
- (Taiwan) Taichung
- (Estonia) Tallinn (▼1)
- (China) Tangshan (▲new)
- (Uzbekistan) Tashkent
- (Netherlands) The Hague
- (Mexico) Tijuana
- (France) Toulouse
- (United States) Tulsa (▲new)
- (Mongolia) Ulaanbaatar
- (China) Ürümqi (▼1)
- (Netherlands) Utrecht
- (Laos) Vientiane (▲new)
- (China) Wenzhou (▲new)
- (Namibia) Windhoek
- (Canada) Winnipeg
- (Poland) Wrocław
- (China) Wuxi
- (Myanmar) Yangon (▼1)
- (Armenia) Yerevan
- (China) Yinchuan (▲new)

== No longer classified ==
The following cities were included in previous editions, but not in the 2024 edition.

=== Last included in 2022 ===
- (Mexico) Aguascalientes
- (Brunei) Bandar Seri Begawan
- (Kyrgyzstan) Bishkek
- (Germany) Bremen
- (Turkey) Bursa
- (Saudi Arabia) Dammam
- (Germany) Essen
- (Japan) Fukuoka
- (France) Grenoble
- (Afghanistan) Kabul
- (Nepal) Kathmandu
- (Rwanda) Kigali
- (Jamaica) Kingston
- (India) Kochi
- (Mexico) León
- (Malawi) Lilongwe
- (Mexico) Mérida
- (Mexico) Mexicali
- (South Africa) Pretoria
- (Canada) Quebec City
- (Iceland) Reykjavík
- (Yemen) Sanaa
- (Venezuela) Valencia

=== Last included in 2020 ===
- (Iraq) Baghdad
- (Republic of the Congo) Brazzaville
- (United States) Buffalo
- (South Korea) Busan
- (United Kingdom) Cardiff
- (Mexico) Chihuahua
- (Moldova) Chișinău
- (Germany) Dortmund
- (Tajikistan) Dushanbe
- (Brazil) Goiânia
- (Austria) Graz
- (Israel) Haifa
- (United States) Harrisburg
- (Australia) Hobart
- (United States) Honolulu
- (Taiwan) Hsinchu
- (Israel) Jerusalem
- (Russia) Kazan
- (Democratic Republic of the Congo) Kinshasa
- (Japan) Kobe
- (Japan) Kyoto
- (Togo) Lomé
- (Malaysia) Malacca City
- (Belarus) Minsk
- (France) Montpellier
- (United States) New Orleans
- (Russia) Novosibirsk
- (United States) Omaha
- (Italy) Palermo
- (South Africa) Port Elizabeth
- (Nigeria) Port Harcourt
- (Papua New Guinea) Port Moresby
- (United States) Rochester
- (Argentina) Rosario
- (Russia) Saint Petersburg
- (Japan) Sapporo
- (Canada) Saskatoon
- (Japan) Sendai
- (United Kingdom) Sheffield
- (Fiji) Suva
- (Taiwan) Tainan
- (Italy) Trieste
- (Chile) Valparaíso
- (Japan) Yokohama

=== Last included in 2018 ===
- (Madagascar) Antananarivo
- (United Kingdom) Leicester
- (United States) Madison
- (China) Nantong
- (China) Weifang
- (China) Xining

=== Last included in 2016 ===
- (India) Aligarh
- (India) Allahabad
- (India) Nagpur
- (Brazil) Natal
- (India) Nashik
- (United States) Providence
- (Libya) Tripoli

=== Last included in 2012 ===
- (United States) Greensboro
- (Germany) Ludwigshafen

=== Last included in 2010 ===
- (United Kingdom) Norwich

=== Last included in 2004 ===
- (Iran) Tehran

== Criticism ==
The methodology and theoretical framework of the Globalization and World Cities Research Network (GaWC) have generated significant debate within urban geography and urban sociology. While widely recognized for pioneering relational approaches to global urbanism, the network's models have faced criticism regarding their narrow economic scope, reliance on proxy data, and Western-centric assumptions.

=== Sectoral narrowness and economic reductionism ===
A central critique of the GaWC framework is its heavy reliance on "advanced producer services" (APS) — specifically accountancy, advertising, banking and finance, and legal services — as the primary metric for defining inter-city connectivity.

Critics contend that evaluating cities solely through multinational corporate services reduces complex urban areas to administrative hubs, overlooking vital sectors such as manufacturing, public administration, logistics, and the informal economy. Furthermore, by framing city value around corporate capital flows, GaWC's rankings underrepresent non-economic dimensions of global influence, including cultural output, political diplomacy, social movements, and public welfare.

=== Methodological limitations and the "proxy problem" ===
Scholars have highlighted methodological constraints within GaWC's Interlocking Network Model (INM). Because comprehensive data on cross-border exchanges of capital, knowledge, and information between firms are proprietary or unavailable, the INM uses the physical presence and organizational hierarchy of firm branch offices across cities as a surrogate (proxy) for actual network flows.

Critics argue that static office distributions do not necessarily reflect active information exchange or equal power relationships between nodes, as local offices may function with substantial operational autonomy. This has led urban researchers to advocate for qualitative approaches that capture human agency and governance dynamics within world city networks.

=== Postcolonial critique and Global South exclusion ===
From a postcolonial perspective, urban theorist Jennifer Robinson argued that global city hierarchies like GaWC's construct a "view from off the map" that systematically marginalizes cities in the Global South. In her analysis of "ordinary cities," Robinson asserts that ranking systems establish a small group of Western capitalist hubs as universal benchmarks, framing unranked or lower-ranked cities as inherently deficient.

Critics warn that this hierarchy operates as a "regulating fiction," pressuring municipal governments in developing nations to prioritize foreign corporate attraction over local developmental challenges, housing, and poverty alleviation.

== See also ==
- Global city
- Primate city
