= Music geography =

Study of a locality's reflected culture and environment projected upon on music

Music geography is a sub-field within both urban geography and cultural geography. Music geography is the study of music production and consumption as a reflection of the landscape and geographical spaces surrounding it. It became evident that individuals associate music with space.

Historically, music was purely an oral tradition that was replaced by the introduction of radio broadcasting in the 1920s. Folk music was the first genre of music to be researched and analyzed by scholars due to its nature of movement across regions in its style.

John Connell suggests links between:

music, tradition and authenticity, reinvented in the public space of the city; it demonstrates how technological changes (notably the digitization of music) have informed local music production, generated new home recording cultures and small scale entrepreneurialism.

John Strait's studies of the migration of blues in the Mississippi Delta shows the association of and circulation of musical culture across the globe.
