= Phil O'Keefe =

British geographer and development specialist (1948–2020)

Phil O'Keefe (December 1948 – 21 September 2020) was emeritus professor at Northumbria University, and a geographer and development specialist with experience in East and Southern Africa.

== Background ==
O'Keefe was born in December 1948 in North Shields, and grew up in Tyne and Wear in north east England. He attended Ushaw College, a Catholic seminary for 8 years. He began studying philosophy at Durham University but changed direction and completed an undergraduate degree in Geography from Newcastle University, and a doctorate at The School of Oriental and African Studies in London. This was awarded in 1978 and concerned the underdevelopment of a village in Murang'a, Kenya (Gakarara: a study in the development of underdevelopment), supervised by the geographer Richard Hodder.

In the 1970s he conducted his doctoral fieldwork in Tanzania, establishing a relationship between rural soil erosion and increased migration and urbanisation trends in Kenya. He then taught in the Sudan, although he reports, unsuccessfully: as a Commonwealth lecturer at the University of Khartoum in 1973, he says "I did little teaching that year. First, the students shut the university. Then, the army shut the university to keep out the students.". He then was a researcher at the Disaster Studies Unit at Bradford University. From 1976 to 1980 he was Visiting Associate Professor in the Graduate School of Geography at Clark University, Worcester MA, USA, co-editing the radical journal Antipode for two years and interacting with US based radical scholars, students and geographers.

In 1980 he joined the Royal Swedish Academy of Sciences as Senior Research Fellow, leading large programs in energy, environment and development at the Beijer Institute (now the Stockholm Environment Institute), largely working in eastern and southern Africa. Projects included the Kenya Woodfuel Cycle addressing wood/charcoal in the energy balance, and the LEAP model, an energy analysis tool. The emphasis was on demand-side analysis that informed the design of agroforestry and improved woodstove interventions, used in Zimbabwe and with the SADC.

In 1984, he returned home to Newcastle upon Tyne, partly for family reasons (he and his partner Di Jelley went on to have 4 children), and to Newcastle Polytechnic, now Northumbria University, later becoming Professor of Economic Development and Environmental Management. At his inaugural Professorial lecture in the mid 1990s, he finished by renouncing the professorship, as a protest against the title being rendered meaningless by its award to others in the university who lacked research records. He established an arm of a Dutch development consultancy, ETC International, in 1988. The office was in Tynemouth above a pub and it handled over 200 contracts and development projects, and two over $10 million in value. ETC work was used to support rural communities, largely in Africa, and positions and doctoral scholarships at the Polytechnic and then the University. In addition, it provided research projects for Northumbria's Masters Programme on Sustainable Development and Disaster Management, which has graduated 350 students since 1990.

O'Keefe served 12 years as a local Labour councillor on North Tyneside Council. He was also a supporter of the African National Congress before and after it gained power in South Africa in 1994, fundraising to assist its transition to a political party, working on the preparation of the Reconstruction and Development Programme for ANC takeover, and serving on the Mineral and Energy Board of the incoming ANC government.

O'Keefe died peacefully in September 2020, after a short battle with cancer.

== Contributions ==
O'Keefe argued, based on fieldwork conducted in Africa and work conducted with colleagues at Bradford University on early forms of Disaster risk reduction, that political and economic forces render people vulnerable to so-called 'natural' disasters such as drought and flooding. This was an early effort to rethink human vulnerability, recognising its social origins beyond 'natural' disasters, using fieldwork and analysis. In the 1970s these ideas were deemed radical, and were developed with scholars including Ben Wisner and Ken Westgate.

O'Keefe also formulated a 'production of nature' thesis with fellow radical geographer Neil Smith. This continued to receive critical interest. His contributions to radical thinking in the social sciences concern the structural origins of vulnerability and poverty, the theorization of human-environment relationships, and the importance of political economy in understanding these relationships.

In applied research work, there were links between ETC projects and academic output, particularly when working for European-funded projects, and in South Africa. O'Keefe and colleagues argued that humanitarian assistance has important political dimensions, in conflict zones and linked to the power of states to conceal, deny aid, or practice new contemporary forms of colonialism. His humanitarian aid evaluations began with the first ever formal evaluation of such aid in Somalia, prior to the Rwandan genocide, and ETC conducted 70 evaluations trying to change accountability structures, governance, leadership responsibilities and architecture of the aid system. Humanitarian aid, he argued, needs to respond to medium- or long-term crises, fostering livelihoods and development through working with affected populations.

Several of O'Keefe's books and reports resulted from detailed surveys of biomass use and supply for rural energy. Other work addressed the effective incorporation of the poor into national policymaking; critiques of the Bruntland Report and formulation of the Millennium Development Goals; and the political economy of climate change adaptation. Another Dutch-funded project was the rehabilitation of game parks and forestry in Mozambique.

From the late 1990s, working with ETC, he led studies of climate-change adaptation to poverty for the Netherlands Climate Assistance Programme, arguing for a shift in focus to better development and resilience, and publishing two books.

== Main publications ==
- Taylor P.J., G. O’Brien and P. O’Keefe. 2020. Cities demanding the Earth: a new understanding of the climate emergency. Bristol University Press.
- Roosli, R. and P. O’Keefe. 2016. A Malaysian Study of Mixed Methods: An Example of Integrating Quantitative and Qualitative Methods. Cambridge: Cambridge Scholars Publishing. ISBN 1-4438-9961-5
- O'Brien, G. and P. O'Keefe. 2014. Managing Adaptation to Climate Risk: Beyond Fragmented Responses. London: Routledge.
- O'Keefe, P., G. O'Brien and N. Pearsall. 2010 The Future of Energy Use. 2nd edition. London: Earthscan. 1st edition Hill, R, P. O'Keefe and C. Snape. 1995. The Future of Energy Use. London: Earthscan.
- Devisscher. T., G. O'Brien, P. O'Keefe and I. Tellam (eds.). 2009. The Adaptation Continuum: Groundwork for the Future. Leusden: ETC Foundation.
- Middleton, N. and P. O'Keefe. 2003. Rio plus ten: politics, poverty and the environment. London: Pluto.
- Middleton, N. P. O'Keefe and R. Visser (eds.). 2001. Negotiating Poverty: new directions, renewed debate. London: Pluto.
- Moyo, S., M. Sill and P. O'Keefe (eds.). 1999. Energy policy and planning in Southern Africa. Harare: SAPES.
- Middleton, N. and P. O'Keefe. 1998. Disaster and development: the politics of humanitarian aid. London: Pluto.
- van Gelder, B. and P. O'Keefe. 1995. The New Forester. Rugby: ITDG Publishing.
- Kirkby, J., P. O'Keefe and L. Timberlake (eds.). 1995. The Earthscan reader in sustainable development. London: Earthscan.
- O'Keefe, P., N. Middleton and S. Moyo. 1993. Tears of the Crocodile: From Rio to Reality in the Developing World. London: Pluto Press.
- Moyo, S., P. O'Keefe and M. Sill. 1993. The Southern African Environment: Profiles of the SADC Countries. Netherlands: ETC Foundation, reprinted Earthscan.
- Munslow, B. with Y. Katerere, A. Fief and P. O'Keefe. 1988. The Fuelwood Trap: A study of the SADCC region. SADCC, reprinted Earthscan.
- O'Keefe, P. 1985. Demand for Commercial Energy in Developing Countries. Sweden: National Energy Administration.
- O'Keefe, P. P. Raskin and S. Bernow (eds.) 1984. Energy and Development in Kenya: Opportunities and Constraints. Uppsala: Scandinavian Institute of African Studies.
- Barnes, C., J. Ensminger and P. O'Keefe (eds.). 1984. Wood, energy and households: perspectives on rural Kenya. Uppsala: Scandinavian Institute of African Studies.
- O'Keefe, P. and B. Munslow (eds.). 1984. Energy and development in southern Africa: SADCC country studies. Uppsala: Scandinavian Institute of African Studies.
- Soussan J, A. Fief and P. O'Keefe. 1984. Fuelwood Strategies and Action Progammmes in Asia. Bangkok: AIT.
- O'Keefe, P. (ed.). 1984. Regional Restructuring Under Advanced Capitalism. London: Croom Helm.
- Smith, N. and P. O'Keefe. 1980. Geography, Marx and the concept of nature. Antipode 12(2): 30-39.
- O'Keefe, P. and K. Johnson (eds.). 1979. Environment and Development: Community Perspectives. Worcester MA: International Development, Clark University.
- ACAS (Association of Concerned African Scholars). contributor. 1979. U.S. Military Involvement in Southern Africa. Boston: South End Press.
- O’Keefe, P. and B. Wisner (eds.). 1977. Land Use and Development. London: International African Institute.
- Westgate, K. and P. O'Keefe. 1976. Natural Disasters: An Intermediate Text. Bradford: Bradford Disaster Research Unit, University of Bradford.
- O'Keefe, P., Westgate, K. & Wisner, B. 1976. Taking the naturalness out of natural disasters. Nature 260: 566–567.
