= Peter J. Taylor =

English geographer

Peter James Taylor FBA FAcSS (born 21 November 1944) is an English geographer. Born in Calverton in Nottinghamshire, he was Professor of Political Geography at the University of Newcastle upon Tyne between 1970 and 1996, before joining Loughborough University as Professor of Geography.

He is the co-founding editor of the journal Political Geography, and is the founder and director of the Globalization and World Cities Research Network and is the author of over 300 publications, of which over 60 have been translated into other languages. In September 2010, he became a professor of geography at Northumbria University.

In 2004, Taylor was elected a Fellow of the British Academy (FBA), the United Kingdom's national academy.

== Publications ==
- International Handbook of Globalization and World Cities (2011)
- Political Geography: World-Economy, Nation-State, Locality (2011)
- Global Urban Analysis: a Survey of Cities in Globalization (2010)
- Cities in Globalization (2006)
- World City Network: a Global Urban Analysis (2004)
- Modernities: a Geohistorical Introduction (1999)
- The Way the Modern World Works: from World Hegemony to World Impasse (1996)
