= Jenny Pickerill =

Environmental geographer

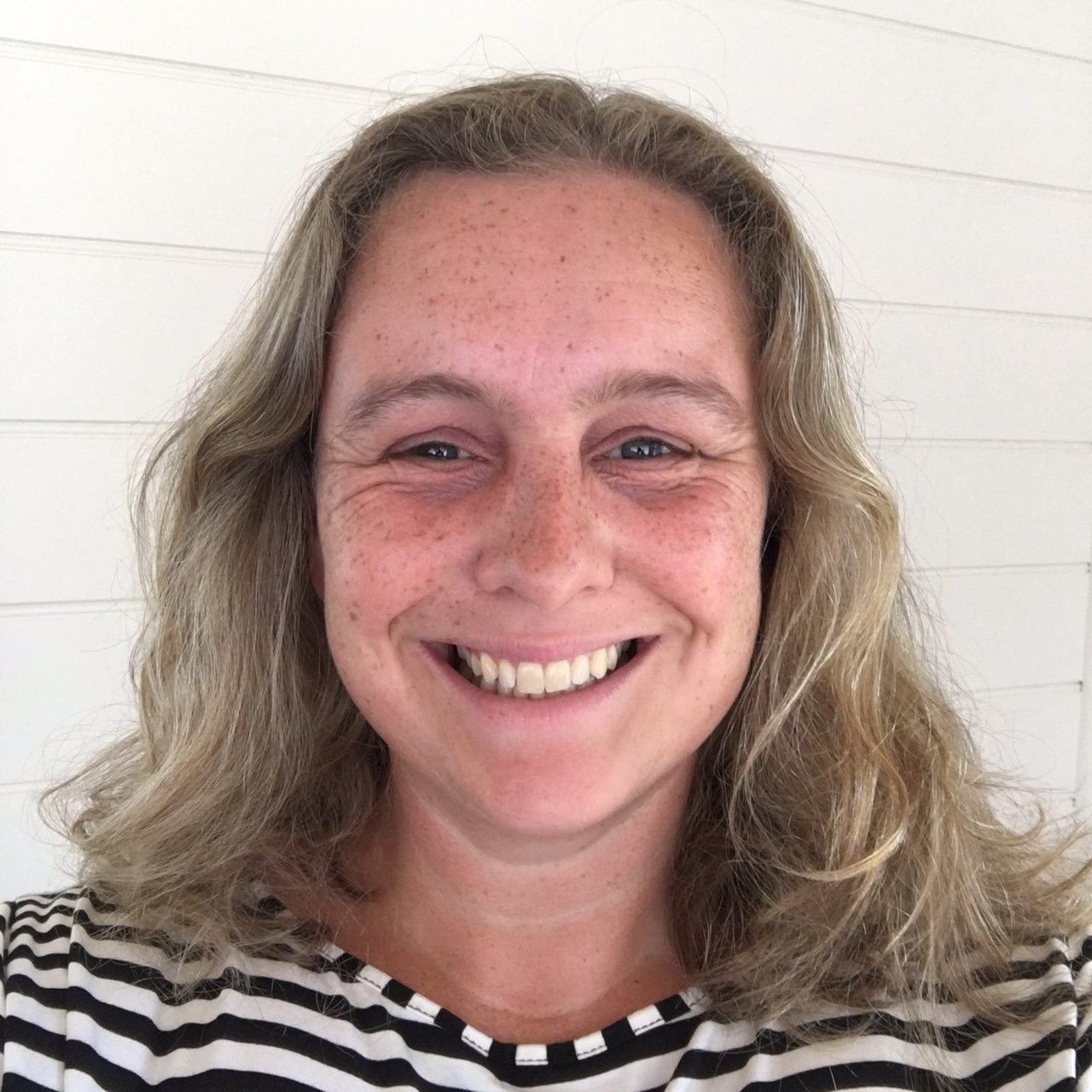
- Education: Newcastle University; University of Edinburgh
- Scientific career
- Workplaces: Lancaster University; University of Edinburgh; Curtin University of Technology; University of Leicester; University of Sheffield
- Thesis: Weaving a green web? Environmental activists' use of computer mediated communication in Britain (2000)

Jenny Pickerill (born 23 November 1973) is a Professor of Environmental Geography at the University of Sheffield and Vice President of Research and Higher Education at the Royal Geographical Society. Her work explores alternatives to capitalism that generate environmental and social justice.

== Early life and education ==
Pickerill studied geography at the Newcastle University. She moved to Scotland for her graduate studies, where she specialised in geographic information systems at the University of Edinburgh. She returned to Newcastle for her doctoral degree, where she earned her PhD in geography in 2000. During her PhD, Pickerill worked briefly at Lancaster University where she worked on a project with Bronislaw Szerszynski.

== Research and career ==
Pickerill started her independent research career at Curtin University in Perth. Here she studied the internet activism of Australian environmentalists. Pickerill was made a lecturer in human geography at the University of Leicester in 2003. She spent 2008 as a visiting fellow at the Oxford Internet Institute. She moved to the University of Sheffield in 2014. Pickerill works on environmental geography, in particular, how people use and value the environment. This aspect of her work has involved the use of social science, investigating the complicated relationships between humans and the environment. Pickerill has explored grassroots initiatives that tackle environmental challenges. She has studied how environmental activists share their understanding of the environment using technology and how they frame their message. She is also interested in environmental activists who choose to protect one aspect of the environment whilst ignoring another. Her work recognises that environmental issues often overlap with other aspects of inequality; including racism, colonialism and neo-liberalism. Often activist movements incorporate populations of a range of social categories, and Pickerill has looked at its role in the Occupy movement, anti-war movement and the environmental movement in Australia.

Pickerill has studied the impact of experimental solutions on environmental challenges and role of students in redesigning their future. This has included ways to self-build safe, environmentally friendly housing. She has revealed that women are not well represented in eco-building communities. She is currently investigating the potential for eco-communities in environmentally friendly, sustainable cities.

== Selected publications ==
- Pickerill, Jenny (2025). Eco-Communities: Surviving Well Together. Bloomsbury.
- Pickerill, Jenny (2006). "Notes towards autonomous geographies: creation, resistance and self-management as survival tactics". Progress in Human Geography. 30 (6): 730–746. doi:10.1177/0309132506071516. hdl:2381/499. S2CID 7080489.
- Pickerill, Jenny (2010). "Everyday activism and transitions towards post‐capitalist worlds". Transactions of the Institute of British Geographers. 35 (4): 475–490. doi:10.1111/j.1475-5661.2010.00396.x.
- Pickerill, Jenny (2003). Cyberprotest: Environmental activism online. Oxford University Press. ISBN 9780719063947.
- Pickerill, Jenny (2016). Eco-Homes: People, Place and Politics (Just Sustainabilities). Zed Books. ISBN 978-1780325309.

Alongside her academic publications, Pickerill has written for The Conversation.
