= Linda McDowell =

British geographer (born 1949)

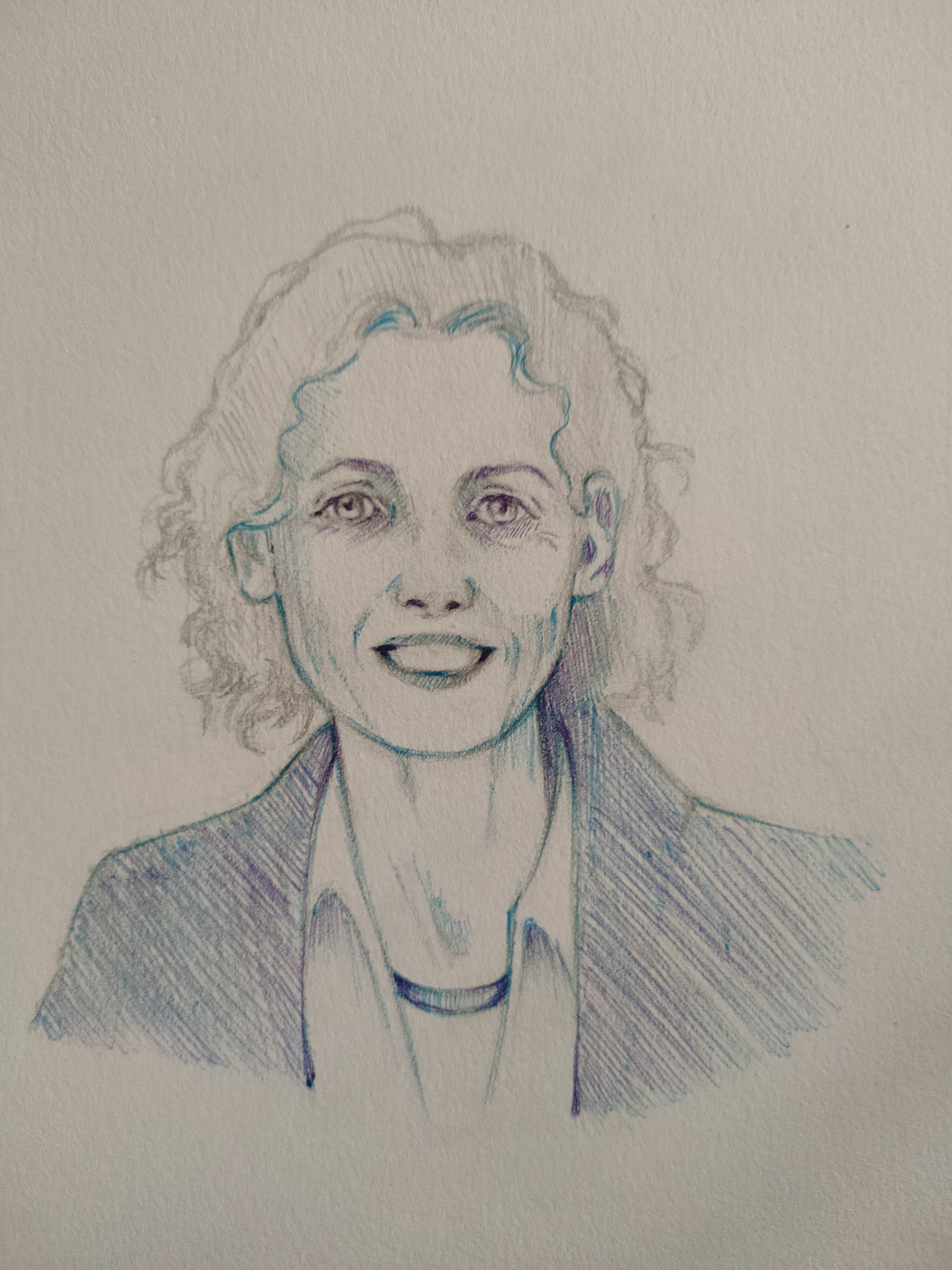
- Born: 1949 (age 76–77)
- Awards: Fellow of the British Academy; Back Award; Victoria Medal

Academic background
- Education: Newnham College, Cambridge; The Bartlett, University College London
- Doctoral advisor: Peter Cowan

Academic work
- Institutions: University of Kent at Canterbury; Institute of Community Studies; Open University; University of Cambridge; London School of Economics; University College London; St John's College, Oxford
- Main interests: Geography
- Notable ideas: Economic geography of work

Linda Margaret McDowell CBE FBA FAcSS (born 1949) is a British geographer and academic, specialising in the ethnography of work and employment. She was Professor of Geography at the University of Oxford from 2004 to 2016.

== Early life and education ==
McDowell studied for her PhD as a part-time student at the Bartlett School of Planning, where she had previously earned a master's degree. Supervised by Peter Cowan, she researched housing change in London.

== Academic career ==
Prior to completing her PhD, she lectured at the Open University. She then returned to the University of Cambridge, where she had studied as an undergraduate. She took a chair at London School of Economics in 1999, after which she moved first to University College London and then, in 2004, to the University of Oxford.

She is an economic geographer, who describes herself as an ethnographer of work and employment. She wrote the first paper on feminism in the journal Society and Space, while her three books on work and gender —Capital Culture: Gender at Work in the City, which explored the role of gender in the City of London's financial services; Gender, Place and Identity, which offered a broader introduction to gender and geography; and Redundant Masculinities, which explored masculinity in the context of economic downturns — have been major contributions to feminist geography and geographies of gender. More recently, her research has explored labour and economic migration since 1945.

McDowell's work has received numerous awards. From the Royal Geographical Society she has been awarded the Back Award and the Victoria Medal. In 2008, she became a fellow of the British Academy. She is also a fellow of the Academy of Social Sciences. McDowell has edited the journals Area and Antipode.

She was appointed Commander of the Order of the British Empire (CBE) in the 2016 New Year Honours for services to geography and higher education.

== Selected publications ==
- (2016) Migrant Women's Voices: talking about life and work in the UK since 1945. Bloomsbury,ISBN 9781474224505.
- (2013) Working Lives: Gender, Migration and Employment in Britain, 1945-2007. Wiley-Blackwell. ISBN 9781444339192.
- (2009) Working Bodies: Interactive service employment and workplace identities. Wiley-Blackwell. ISBN 978-1-4051-5977-7.
- (2005) Hard Labour: the forgotten voices of Latvian migrant 'volunteer' workers. UCL Press / Cavendish Publishing, London. ISBN 1844720209.
- (2003) Redundant Masculinities? Employment change and white working class youth. Blackwell, Oxford. ISBN 978-1-4051-0585-9.
- (1999) Gender, Identity and Place. Cambridge: Polity.
- (1997) Capital Culture: Gender at Work in the City of London. Oxford: Blackwell
- (1991). Life without father and Ford: The new gender order of post-Fordism. Transactions of the Institute of British Geographers 400–419
- (1991). Multiple voices: Speaking from inside and outside the project. Antipode 24, 56-72
