= Edward Relph =

Canadian geographer (born 1944)

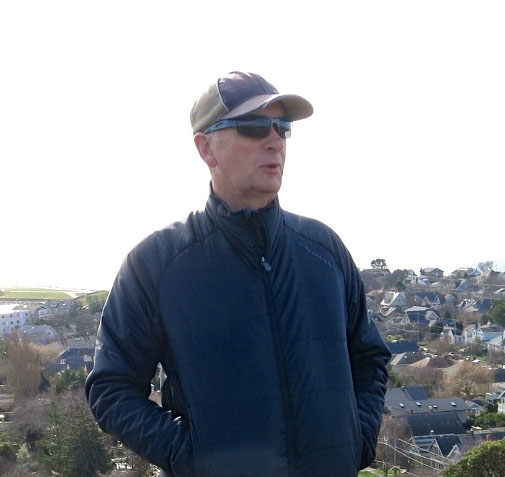
- Born: Edward Charles Relph; May 18, 1944 (age 82); Wales

Edward "Ted" Relph is a Canadian geographer, best known for the book Place and Placelessness.

== Career ==
Relph grew up in Wales in the Wye Valley and studied at the Joint School of Geography at the University of London and at the University of Toronto. He is an emeritus professor of the University of Toronto, where he served from 1991 to 1999 as Chair of the Division of Social Sciences at the Scarborough campus. From 1999 to 2005 Relph was Associate Principal responsible for the expansion and redevelopment of that campus, and served again as Chair of Social Sciences from 2008 to 2010.

Relph now lives in Victoria, British Columbia.

Relph has written many academic articles and book chapters that investigate the phenomenological and experiential foundations of geography, and others that elaborate sense of place and the ways experiences of place are currently being transformed. Place and Placelessness was reassessed and updated at a conference organized by Rob Freestone and Edgar Liu of the University of New South Wales that resulted in the publication of Place and Placelessness Revisited (edited by Freestone and Liu) in 2016.

== Publications ==
- Place and Placelessness, first published in 1976 and reissued in 2010, is a phenomenological account of how places are experienced and how they are changing. It was one of the first books that explicitly examined the idea of place, and also one of the first phenomenological studies in geography. It has been widely cited and has been described as a Classic in Human Geography in both Progress in Human Geography, Vol 24, No 4, 2000, and Classics in Human Geography, ed. P. Hubbard, R. Kitchen, & G. Vallentine, Sage, 2008. It has been translated into several languages including Japanese, Korean and Chinese.
- Rational Landscapes and Humanistic Geography, published in 1981, explores why modern built environments provide material comfort and efficiency yet breed criticism and despair rather than hope and commitment. It was reissued as a Routledge Revival in 2015.
- The Modern Urban Landscape, published in 1987, examines why urban landscapes built since about 1900 look as they do by tracing changes in planning and architecture through the rise of modernism to post-modernism and the corporatization of cities. It has been reprinted several times and translated into Portuguese, Japanese and Chinese. (Johns Hopkins University Press1987)
- Toronto: Transformations in a City and its Region, published in 2014, draws on the ideas of Torontonians Marshall McLuhan and Jane Jacobs to explore the changes in Toronto since about 1970.(University of Pennsylvania Press 2014)
- The Toronto Guide: the City, Metro, the Region (1990), reissued by the Centre for Urban and Community Studies, University of Toronto 1997 and 2002
- "An Inquiry into the Relations between Geography and Phenomenology," Canadian Geographer, 1970
- "To See with the Soul of the Eye," Landscape, 1979 (republished in Orion 1984 and the Utne Reader 1986)
- "Seeing, Thinking and Describing Landscape", in Environment, Perception and Behavior, eds. T. Saarinen, D. Seamon and J. Sell, University of Chicago, Department of Geography Research Series, No. 209, 1984
- "Geographical Experience and Being-in-the-World", in Dwelling, Place and Environment, eds. D. Seamon and R. Mugerauer, Martinus Nijhof, 1985
- "The Reclamation of Place" Orion, 1993
- "Sense of Place" in Ten Geographical Ideas that Have Changed the World, ed. S. Hanson, Rutgers University Press 1997
- "The Critical Description of Confused Geographies" in Textures of Place: Exploring Humanist Geographies, eds. P. Adams, K. Till, S. Hoelscher, University of Minnesota Press, 2001
- Spirit of Place and Sense of Place in Virtual Realities", in Techne: Research in Technology and Philosophy, ed. E. Champion, 2007
- "A Pragmatic Sense of Place" in Making Sense of Place, eds. F. Vanclay, et al., Australian National Museum, 2008
- "Place and Connection" in The Intelligence of Place: Topographies and Poetics, ed. J. Malpas, Bloomsbury Academic, 2015
- "The Paradox of Place and the Evolution of Placelessness" in Place and Placelessness Revisited eds R. Freestone and E. Liu, Taylor and Francis, 2016
- "The Openness of Place" in Place and Phenomenology ed J. Donohue, Rowman and Littlefield, 2017
- "Landscape as a Language without Words" in Handbook of the Changing World Map ed S. Brunn, Springer online, 2018
- "The Inconspicuous Familiarity of Landscape" in The Phenomenology of Real and Virtual Places ed E. Champion, Routledge, 2019
- "Digital Disorientation and Place” Memory Studies 2021 Vol 14(3) 572-577
- "Electronically mediated sense of place," Chapter 19 in Christopher Raymond, Lynne Manzo, Daniel Williams, Andres Masso, Timo von Wirth, (Eds), Changing Senses of Place: Navigating Global Challenges, Cambridge University Press, 2021.
