= Jane Wills =

British geographer

Jane Wills FBA (born 1965) is a British geographer and academic. She is professor of geography at the University of Exeter. She was elected to the Fellowship of the British Academy in 2022, in recognition of her contributions to Political Geography.

== Life ==
Jane Wills was educated at Wymondham College before studying geography at St Catharine's College, Cambridge. She gained a PhD at the Open University, supervised by Doreen Massey and John Allen. She taught at the University of Cambridge before being appointed to a lectureship at the University of Southampton in 1993. In 1998 she became a lecturer in geography at Queen Mary University of London, later becoming professor of human geography there. In 2013 Wills won the Royal Geographical Society's Back Award. In 2017, she became professor of geography at the University of Exeter.

In 2022, she was elected a Fellow of the British Academy (FBA), the United Kingdom's national academy for the humanities and social sciences.

== Works ==
- (with Ron Martin and Peter Sunley) Union Retreat and the Regions: The Shrinking Landscape of Organised Labour, 1996
- (ed. with Roger Lee) Geographies of economies. London: Arnold, 1997
- (with Alison Blunt) Dissident geographies: an introduction to radical ideas and practice. Harlow: Prentice Hall, 2000
- (ed. with Peter Waterman) Place, space and the new labour internationalisms. Oxford: Blackwell, 2001
- Union futures: building networked trade unionism in the UK. London: Fabian Society, 2002
- (ed. with Angela Hale) Threads of labour: garment industry supply chains from the workers' perspective. Oxford: Blackwell, 2005.
- (with Kavita Datta, Yara Evans, Joanna Herbert, Jon May and Cathy McIlwaine) Global cities at work: new migrant divisions of labour. London: Pluto Press, 2010
- Locating localism: statecraft, citizenship and democracy. Bristol: Policy Press, 2016
- (ed. with Robert W Lake) The Power of Pragmatism: Knowledge production and social inquiry. Manchester: Manchester University Press, 2020.
