= Rachel Pain =

Rachel Harriet Pain (born 16 August 1968) is Professor of Human Geography at Newcastle University since 2017 and was elected a Fellow of the Academy of Social Sciences in 2018.

She previously served as Deputy Head of Department of Geography at Durham University, and was also the Co-Founder/Director of the Centre for Social Justice and Community Action and the Participatory Research Hub. Per Scopus, Pain has a h-index of 42. In 2022, she was conference chair of the Royal Geographical Society with the Institute of British Geographers annual conference.

== Early life ==
Pain was born in Northumberland and grew up in Newcastle-upon-Tyne. She graduated from Lancaster University and completed her PhD at the University of Edinburgh.

== Research ==
Pain is a social geographer whose work draws upon feminist geography and participatory action research. She has published widely on issues of violence, community safety, trauma and fear, with specific attention being given to issues of gender-based violence. In 2019, she received the Urban Studies Best Article for 2019 award for her article "Chronic urban trauma: The slow violence of housing dispossession", and in 2020, she presented the Distinguished Jan Monk lecture.

== Awards ==
- 2022 IGU Distinguished Practice Award
- 2022 Jan Monk Service Award (https://www.aag.org/2022-aag-specialty-and-affinity-group-awards/))
- 2019 Urban Studies Best Paper Award
- 2018 Fellow of the Academy of Social Sciences
- 2009 Julian Minghi Outstanding Research Award of the Political Geography Specialty Group of the Association of American Geographers (for ‘Fear: Critical Geopolitics and Everyday Life’, with Susan Smith)
- 2008 Royal Geographical Society Gill Memorial Award (for contributions to social geography and participatory research)
- 2005 Philip Leverhulme Prize

== Key publications ==
- Newcastle Social Geographies Collective (2020) Social Geographies: An Introduction. London: Rowman & Littlefield.
- Smith S J, Pain R, Marston S, Jones J P (2010) Handbook of Social Geographies. London: Sage
- Pain R and Smith S J (2008) Fear: Critical Geopolitics and Everyday Life. Aldershot: Ashgate
- Kindon S, Pain R and Kesby M (2007) Participatory Action Research Approaches and Methods: Connecting People, Participation and Place. London: Routledge
- Pain R, Barke M, Gough J, Fuller D, MacFarlane R, Mowl G (2001) Introducing Social Geographies. Arnold, London
