= Gill Valentine =

British geographer

Gill Valentine FBA FAcSS

Academic background
- Education: University of Reading (PhD)
- Thesis: Women's fear of male violence in public space: a spatial expression of patriarchy (1989)
- Doctoral advisor: Sophie Bowlby

Academic work
- Discipline: Geographer
- Sub-discipline: Social geography; feminist geography
- Institutions: University of Leeds; University of Sheffield

Gill Valentine FBA FAcSS is a British geographer and professor emeritus of geography and deputy vice-chancellor at the University of Sheffield.

Before joining Sheffield in 2012, Valentine was head of Geography at the University of Leeds. She co-founded the journal Social & Cultural Geography in 2000.

== Career ==
Valentine worked at the University of Sheffield between 1994 and 2004, at which point she left to work at the University of Leeds where she was head of the school of geography. In 2012, she re-joined Sheffield as Pro-Vice Chancellor for Social Sciences. Valentine is a member of the university's executive board, and has chaired the Equality, Diversity & Inclusion Committee.

== Research ==
Valentine is a specialist in social geography, with her key areas of research covering social identities and belonging; childhood, parenting and family life; and urban cultures and consumption. Her research in particular has focused on geographies of childhood, on alcohol-consumption and youth culture and on women's geographies. A co-founder of the journal Social & Cultural Geography and co-editor of former co-editor of Gender, Place and Culture, she has made significant contributions to feminist geography.

== Awards ==
- The Philip Leverhulme Prize, 2001
- The Royal Geographical Society's Gill Memorial Award,
- Murchison Award by the Royal Geographical Society for "publications relating to the geography of difference, equality and diversity" (2015)
- Fellow of the Academy of Social Sciences.
- Fellow of the British Academy (FBA), 2018

== Selected publications ==
- 1989. "The Geography of Women's Fear" in Area 12(1) pp. 385–390.
- 1993. "(Hetero)Sexing Space: Lesbian Perceptions and Experiences of Everyday Spaces," in Environment and Planning D: Society and Space 11(4) pp. 395–413.
- 1995. Mapping Desire: Geographies of Sexualities, Psychology Press (with David Bell).
- 1997. Consuming Geographies: We Are Where We Eat, Psychology Press (with David Bell)
- 2005. Cool Places: Geographies of Youth Cultures, Routledge.
