= Central Europe Thirty Years After the Fall of Communism =

2022 book by Aliaksei Kazharski

Central Europe Thirty Years after the Fall of Communism. A Return to the Margin? is a book by Aliaksei Kazharski, a researcher and lecturer at the Faculty of Social Sciences of Charles University in Prague, Czech Republic. The book was published in 2022 by Rowman & Littlefield and won the 2022/2023 Book Award of the Global International Relations Section (GIRS) of the International Studies Association.

== Background ==
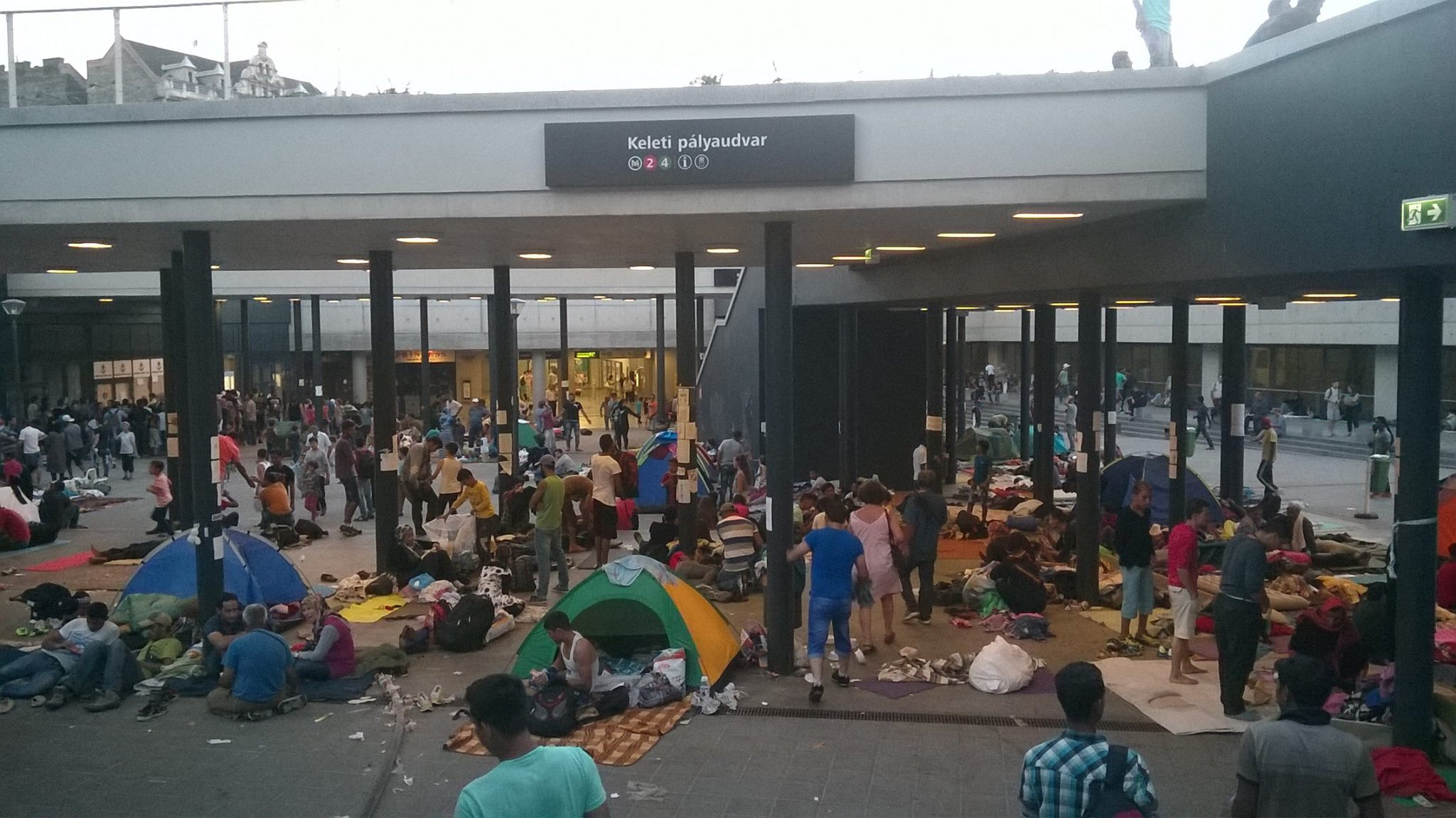
Asylum seekers from MENA camping at the Budapest Keleti Station on August 29, 2015, where the preface of the book picks up.

The book was written as a follow up on a research article by the same author, first published in the Geopolitics journal in 2017 in response to the 2015 migration crisis and the disagreements between the new post-Communist member states in the Visegrád Four on the one hand and the EU and some of its Western European member states on the other. The disagreements emerged over the proposed system of refugee redistribution quotas. A reworked and updated version of the article is included in the book as Chapter 2. The monograph is 214 page long and includes seven chapters, a preface, introduction, and conclusion.

== Contents ==
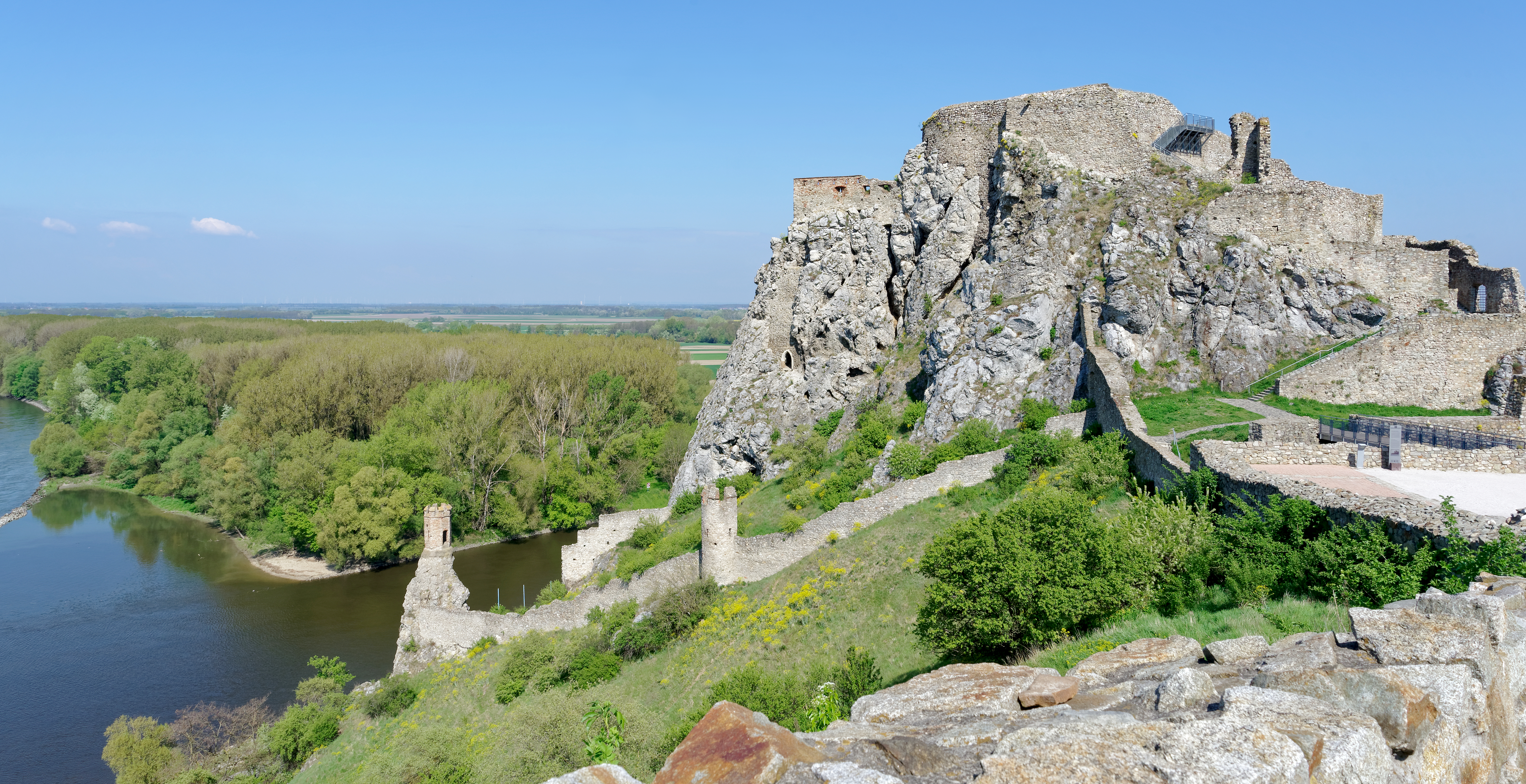
Devín Castle in Slovakia

The cover of the book features the ancient Devín Castle in Bratislava, Slovakia, situated at the confluence of the Danube and Morava rivers. The border between Slovakia and Austria runs through the rivers. Prior to the fall of Communism this was also the border between what was known during the Cold War as "Eastern" and "Western" Europe.

The book was reviewed in the Journal of Contemporary European Studies, Eurasian Geography and Economics, Europe-Asia Studies, the Hungarian Geographical Bulletin, and Satori. Andrey Makarychev, Professor of Regional Political Studies at the University of Tartu, noted that the work combined an "insider's perspective on Central Europe" with "insightful conceptualizations of key analytical categories that are indispensable for studying foreign and security policies in a broader context." Laure Delcour, Associate Professor at Université Sorbonne Nouvelle in Paris, praised the book for "bringing nuances and complexity to the frequently oversimplified picture of the region." Gela Merabishvili, researcher at Eötvös Loránd University in Budapest, argued that the book would have increased relevance following the start of the 2022 Russian invasion of Ukraine but also criticized it for an insufficient definition of Central Europe as "a region-building discourse" as well as for not exploring empirically "how each V4 country leverages the discourse on Central Europe to position itself within Europe."
