= Critical geopolitics =

Geopolitical theory and academic school of thought

In the humanities discipline of critical theory, critical geopolitics is an academic school of thought centered on the idea that intellectuals of statecraft construct ideas about places, that these ideas have influence and reinforce their political behaviors and policy choices, and that these ideas affect how people process their own notions of places and politics.

Critical geopolitics sees the geopolitical as comprising four linked facets: popular geopolitics, formal geopolitics, structural geopolitics, and practical geopolitics. Critical geopolitical scholarship continues to engage critically with questions surrounding geopolitical discourses, geopolitical practice (i.e. foreign policy), and the history of geopolitics.

== Key ideas and concepts ==
Rooted in poststructuralism as well as various versions of postcolonial scholarship, critical geopolitical inquiry is, at its core, concerned with the operation, interaction, and contestation of geopolitical discourses.

This poststructuralist orientation holds that the realities of global political space do not simply reveal themselves to detached, omniscient observers. Rather, geopolitical knowledges are seen as partial and situated, emergent from particular subject positions. In this context, geopolitical practices result from complex constellations of competing ideas and discourses, which they in turn modify. The linkages between geographical patterns and processes, on the one hand, and various types of discourses on the other hand, are a key contribution to the geography of media and communication. They also imply that geopolitical practice is not, therefore, unproblematically 'right' or 'natural'.

Further, since geopolitical knowledge is seen as partial, situated and embodied, nation-states are not the only 'legitimate' unit of geopolitical analysis within critical geopolitics. Instead, geopolitical knowledge is seen as more diffuse, with 'popular' geopolitical discourse considered alongside 'formal' and 'practical' geopolitics. These three 'strands' of geopolitical thought are outlined below:

=== Popular geopolitics ===
Popular geopolitics is one of the ways in which geopolitical knowledge is produced. It argues that geopolitical ideas are not only shaped by the state, intellectual elites and politicians. Rather, it is also shaped and communicated through popular culture and everyday practices. Popular culture construct a common sense understanding of world politics through the use of movies, books, magazines, etc.

Political geographers have widely studied the role of popular culture in shaping the popular understanding of politics. Klaus Dodds, a political geographer, studied the conveyance of geopolitical ideas through movies. While analyzing James Bond movies, he discovered a recurring message of Western states' geopolitical anxieties. For example, the movie From Russia with Love conveyed United States' anxieties as a result of the Cold War and The World Is Not Enough conveyed the threats posed by Central Asia.

=== Structural geopolitics ===
Structural geopolitics is defined as contemporary geopolitical tradition.

=== Formal geopolitics ===
Formal geopolitics refers to the geopolitical culture of more 'traditional' geopolitical actors. Critical accounts of formal geopolitics therefore pay attention to the ways in which formal foreign policy actors and professionals - including think-tanks and academics - mediate geopolitical issues such that particular understandings and policy prescriptions become hegemonic, even common-sense.

=== Practical geopolitics ===
Practical geopolitics describes the actual practice of geopolitical strategy (i.e. foreign policy). Studies of practical geopolitics focus both on geopolitical action and geopolitical reasoning, and the ways in which these are linked recursively to both 'formal' and 'popular' geopolitical discourse. Because critical geopolitics is concerned with geopolitics as discourse, studies of practical geopolitics pay attention both to geopolitical actions (for example, military deployment), but also to the discursive strategies used to narrativize these actions.

The "critical" in critical geopolitics therefore relates to two (linked) aims. Firstly, it seeks to 'open up' Geopolitics, as a discipline and a concept. It does this partly by considering the popular and formal aspects of geopolitics alongside practical geopolitics. Further, it focuses on the power relations and dynamics through which particular understandings are (re)constructed. Secondly, critical geopolitics engages critically with 'traditional' geopolitical themes. The articulation of 'alternative' narratives on geopolitical issues, however, may or may not be consistent with a poststructuralist methodology.

== Key texts ==
=== Emergence of critical geopolitics ===
Critical geopolitics is an ongoing project which came to prominence when the French geographer Yves Lacoste published 'La géographie ça sert d'abord à faire la guerre' ('geography is primarily for waging war') (1976) and founded the journal Hérodote. The subject entered the English language Geography literature in the 1990s thanks in part to a special "Critical Geopolitics" issue of the journal Political Geography in 1996 (vol. 15/6-7), and the publication in the same year of Gearóid Ó Tuathail's seminal Critical Geopolitics book.

Ó Tuathail's 1996 book Critical Geopolitics defined the state of the subdiscipline at the time, and codified its methodological and intellectual underpinnings.

The historical role of Europe has been subjected to a rich tradition of critical works in geopolitics, as reflected in several book series, such as Routledge's Critical Geopolitics series, edited by Alan Ingram, Merje Kuus and Chih Yuan Woon, as well as the series on Critical European Studies (also at Routledge), edited by Yannis Stivachtis. Contributing to this area is the book entitled The European Union and Global Social Change: A Critical Geopolitical-Economic Analysis by József Böröcz.

=== Critical Geopolitics texts ===
Critical geopolitics-based work has been published in a range of Geographical and trans-disciplinary journals, as well as in books and edited collections. Major journals in which critical geopolitics work has appeared include:

- Annals of the Association of American Geographers
- Antipode
- Geopolitics
- Political Geography

Elsewhere, critical geopolitics-derived studies have been published in journals specializing in popular culture, security studies, border studies (such as in the Journal of Borderlands Studies) and history, reflecting the breadth of subject matter subsumed under the critical geopolitics headline.

==== Texts in Critical Geopolitical theory ====
Critical geopolitics 'theory' is not fixed or homogeneous, but core features - especially a concern for discourse analysis - are fundamental.

- Introduction to critical geopolitical theory: Gearóid Ó Tuathail's (1996) Critical Geopolitics (London: Routledge) details the aims, scope and intellectual context of Critical Geopolitics. It also provides a genealogical account of the history of Geopolitics, placing Critical Geopolitics in its temporal and disciplinary context.
- Relationship between 'classical' and critical geopolitics: There are thematic concerns in common between classical and critical geopolitics, leading to the question of whether 'mainstream' International Relations theory and geopolitics can be reconciled with the critical project. In a 2006 article in the journal Geopolitics (vol. 11/1), Phil Kelly of Emporia State University argues that it is possible.

Popular engagement with the geopolitical, as (re)presented in popular culture, is a major area of research within the critical geopolitics literature:

- Newspapers: The framing of geopolitical events in mass circulation newspapers has been addressed by a number of authors. Thomas McFarlane and Iain Hay's (2003) article in Political Geography, 'The battle for Seattle: protest and popular geopolitics in The Australian newspaper', is a highly cited example. Further, it exemplifies how critical geopolitics research can use both qualitative and quantitative approaches to discourse analysis.
- Magazines: Joanne Sharp's analysis of the ways in which the Reader's Digest (re)presented a sense of US national identity during the Cold War started life as a 1993 article in the journal Political Geography. Subsequently, it spurred her 2000 book Condensing the Cold War: Reader's Digest and American Identity. Further, Sharp's methodology prompted an in-depth debate (2003) about the practice of popular geopolitics, in the pages of the journal Geopolitics (vol.8/2).
- Cartoons and Comics: An early (1996) and frequently-cited popular geopolitics study by Klaus Dodds considers the geopolitical content and effect of cartoons by Guardian cartoonist Steve Bell during the Falklands War; 'The 1982 Falklands War and a critical geopolitical eye: Steve Bell and the If cartoons' was published in Political Geography (vol. 15/6). Jason Dittmer has explored the comic book titles of Captain America as an illustration of a "nuanced and ambiguous" geopolitical script in popular culture. 'Captain America's Empire: Reflections on Identity, Popular Culture, and Post-9/11 Geopolitics' was published in the Annals of the Association of American Geographers (vol.95/3).
- Films: Hollywood has been the subject of numerous popular geopolitics studies, both from explicitly 'geographical' perspectives, but also from academics from a range of backgrounds. Studies of film range from those that deal explicitly with the intertextuality between 'war films' and 'real' wars, to those that deal more broadly with issues of identity formation and representation.
- Radio: In more recent years, scholars of critical geopolitics have shown an increased interest in radio broadcasting as both a domestic and international form of geopolitical communication. Alasdair Pinkerton and Klaus Dodds laid out their agenda for the study of Radio Geopolitics in Progress in Human Geography (vol. 33/1) during 2009. Pinkerton has also written about the crucial role of radio during the Falklands Conflict. His paper 'Strangers in the Night': The Falklands Conflict as a Radio War was published in Twentieth Century British History (vol. 19/3) and was awarded the TCBH Essay Prize 2007.

== Notable people ==
- John A. Agnew
- Simon Dalby
- Derek Gregory
- Klaus Dodds
- Gearóid Ó Tuathail

== See also ==
- Balkanization
- Geopolitik
- Geostrategy
- Lebensraum
- Petroleum politics
- Realpolitik
- Theopolitics
