= Geopolitical imagination =

World views reflecting differing visions

Geopolitical imaginations are constructed views of the world that reflect the vision of a place's, a country's or a society's role within world politics. Geopolitical imaginations are constituted by shared assumptions and representations of power relations and conflicts in world politics within a certain geographical territory. By critically analyzing how and why these imaginations are constructed, it is possible to reveal underlying power relations and to get a better understanding of various conflicts. Therefore, geopolitical imaginations are closely connected to the academic field of critical geopolitics.

== Concept ==
Geopolitical imaginations are composed of the representation of a country's territorial limits and its geopolitical code which is “[...] a set of strategic assumptions that a government makes about other states”. These so-called geopolitical codes are based on national identity (particularly in ‘them’ and ‘us’ distinctions), emotional attachment to a place as well as national myths. Geopolitical imaginations provide the legitimisation for geopolitical actions or certain positions in foreign and domestic policy. Geopolitical imaginations are reflections of current discourses and therefore they are not fixed but rather vary over time and in different societies. Research has primarily analyzed geopolitical imaginations of European and North American countries, ignoring the fact that in other socio-political contexts there exist different ‘non-western’ geopolitical imaginations.

== Hegemonic geopolitical imaginations in history ==
The view of the world as two polarizing ideological blocs (western and eastern bloc) is a geopolitical imagination which was dominant during time of the Cold War. Designations such as the Iron Curtain (the boundary between the bipolar powers) helped to justify certain politics and policies, e.g. in the United States in foreign policy by containment (a military strategy to stop the expansion of the ‘enemy’) or in domestic policy with the expansion of homeland security which enforced technologies of control and disciplining. Samuel P. Huntington made a draft of a fragmented conflicted world order. In his popular hypothesis called ”The Clash of Civilizations” (1996), he divided the world map geographically into rigid cultural entities, such as the Western bloc, the Islamic bloc or the African bloc, and proclaimed that the next major conflict will occur between these different cultures. In the 21st century, “hegemonic geographical imaginations are dominated by the affective geopolitics of the War on Terror”. This has been a consequence of the synthesis between the Clash of Civilizations, the terror attacks of 9/11 and the following designations of rogue states (states which have been blamed for threatening the world peace) and the axis of evil (states which have been accused of supporting terrorism and aspiring to weapons of mass destruction).

== See also ==
- Critical geopolitics
- Geopolitics
- Imagined geographies
