= Geography of media and communication =

Field of human geography

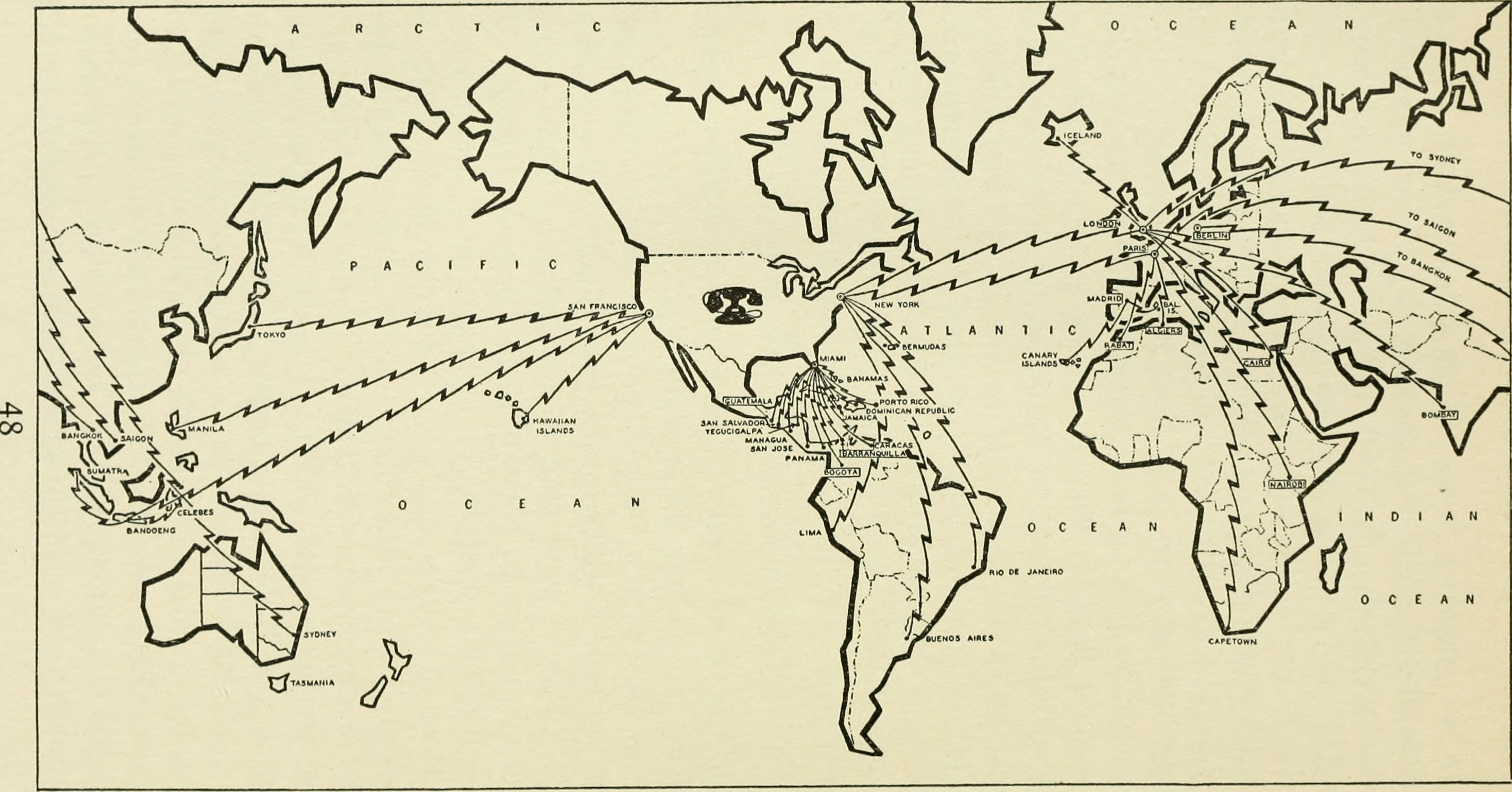
World map showing international telephone connections from Bell telephone magazine, 1922.

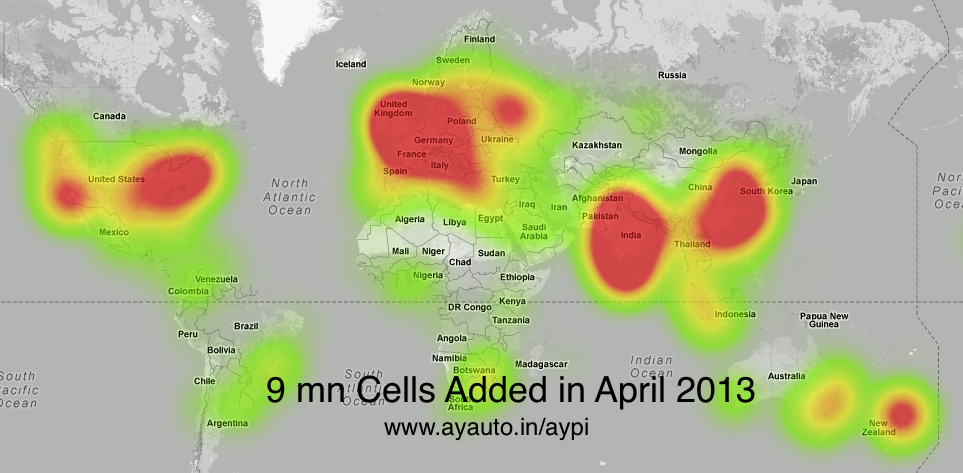
World map showing density of cell phone towers in 2013.

Geography of media and communication (also known as communication geography, media geography and geographies of media) is an interdisciplinary research area bringing together human geography with media studies and communication theory. Research addressing the geography of media and communication seeks to understand how acts of communication and the systems they depend on both shape and are shaped by geographical patterns and processes. This topic addresses the prominence of certain types of communication in differing geographical areas, including how new technology allows for new types of communication for a multitude of global locations.

== Overview ==
Geography of media and communication is an area of research, which considers various facets of communication. One interest is the layout and organization of communication systems at scales from cities to the planet. Closely related to this are the varying levels of access to communication systems from place to place. Attention to how places differ in regard to communication access leads to an interest in the changes that occur in places when new media diffuse into those places. A complementary interest is in how places are represented in various media—for example pictures of idyllic beaches in tourism advertisements or written descriptions of war zones in newspaper stories. Communications also allow people to interact with distant places, so a final area of investigation is how, by interacting with others through various kinds of communication systems, people inhabit various kinds of "virtual" spaces.

Of particular interest to media/communication theorists are questions regarding the social and cultural formations associated with media, which in turn point to how media are involved in the transformation of belonging and citizenship, which relate to geographical territories. Social and cultural formations also depend on distinctions between public and private life, which have traditionally depended on spatial boundaries between public and private places. Topics of particular interest to geographers are place representations in visual media including photography, film and graffiti, in auditory media including radio and music recordings, and even in embodied communications such as dance and video games.

== History ==
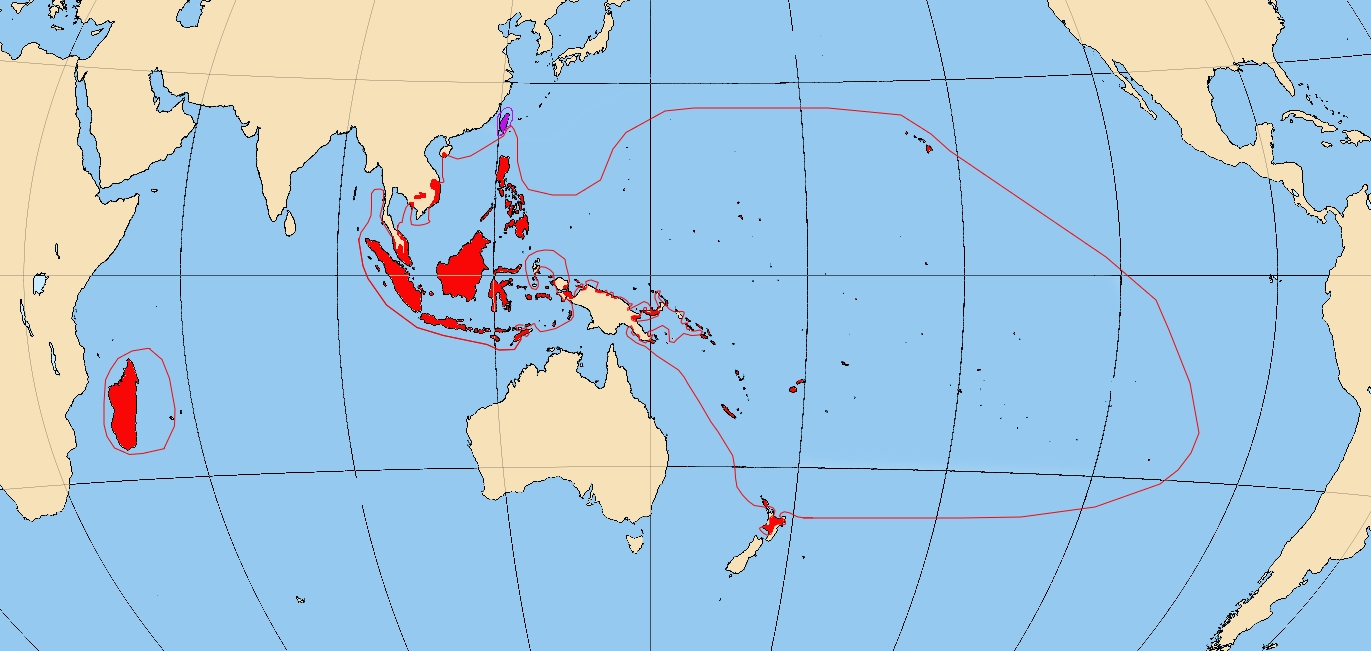
Map of the culture region corresponding to the Austronesian language family

Geographical interest in the systematic study of communication can be traced to the writings of Richard Hartshorne in the 1930s. Hartshorne considered language to be a key element forming culture regions, meaning that the dominant language is similar within a particular culture region and it changes when one leaves a culture region. A very different aspect of communication became the focus during the 1950s and 1960s as geographers began to measure and model the interactions between locations. In this case, geographers involved in the quantitative revolution explained the accelerating flow of information between locations in terms of "time-space convergence" and "human extensibility." It was not until the 1970s that geographers began to focus on communications in terms of content, considering questions of symbolism, representation, metaphor, iconography and discourse. This interest first took form in geographical research that drew on humanism, phenomenology and hermeneutics. By the 1990s, this approach shifted towards a more critical sensibility unpacking the various meanings of landscape. Geographers researching communication over the past two decades have extended these research areas while carrying forward early insights regarding the importance of communication to the formation of regions, the rate of information flow as a measure of spatial interaction, and the association between landscape and representation. New approaches to communication have been advanced under the frameworks of non-representational theory, actor-network theory, and assemblage theory. Equally important is the effort to think through digital code and its relationship with space.

== Evolution of Geographic Communication ==
Throughout different areas of the world, certain types of communication are used more in certain places, and have evolved over time. America and other developed countries have gotten information and communicated within their local communities through newspapers and other forms of written communication in the past and present, but in the cases of certain types of communication such as environmental and risk communication, there has been a shift as newspapers are no longer the most effective form of communication. Part of the shift in communication over time comes from an increased presence of social media.

=== Social Media Evolution ===
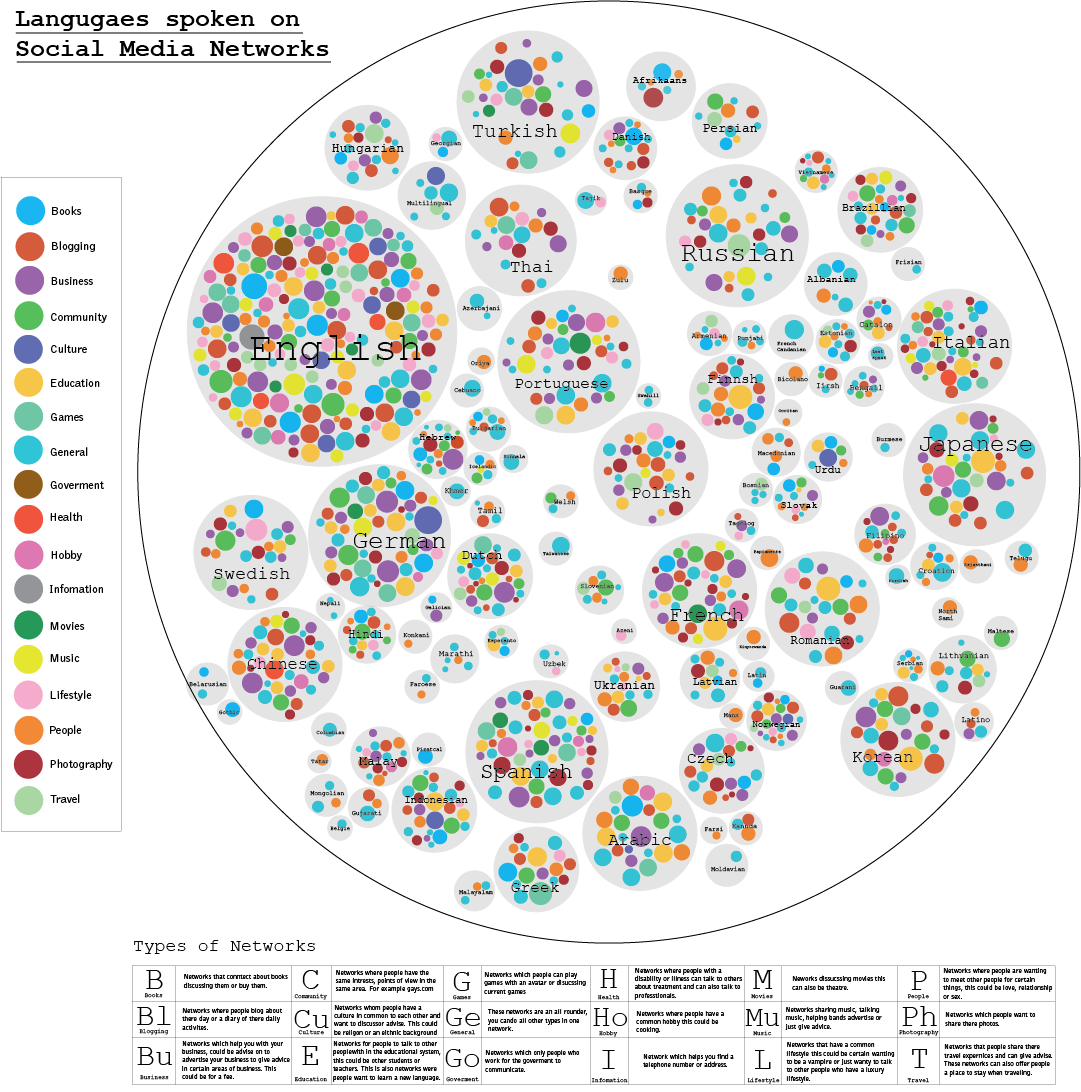
Languages spoken in various social media platforms, showing the global activity of social media.

Social media caused a new experience in geographical communication as it allowed instant contact with various people around the globe. Social media communication has been tracked through the United States, and on certain social media platforms there is the ability to track and log communication to and from all areas of the world. For example, the Twitter accounts of various geography departments have been used to show how interaction is divided within local, national, and global lines of communication, while also being able to analyze other aspects of the communication data. This is seen when viewing common days of the week which are active or which months show heavy interaction between accounts. Analysis of larger cities throughout the world shows that social media has become a predominant force in communication for many communities. While there may be similar exposure to social media in wildly different areas across the world, evidence shows that the same type of social media communication is not equally effective in differing areas. Geographical locations with larger populations of higher education levels will interact and understand communication through social media more effectively than areas with lower education levels. While social media can be used to communicate information within and between communities throughout the world, it can also be an influence in public perception of rumors and risks. This study was conducted in 2015 when South Korea became panicked over a disease because of the rumors circling through social media about the disease and how it was negatively affecting people of the country. Based on the findings from this research, social media has a large influence on public perception throughout communities.

== Areas of study ==
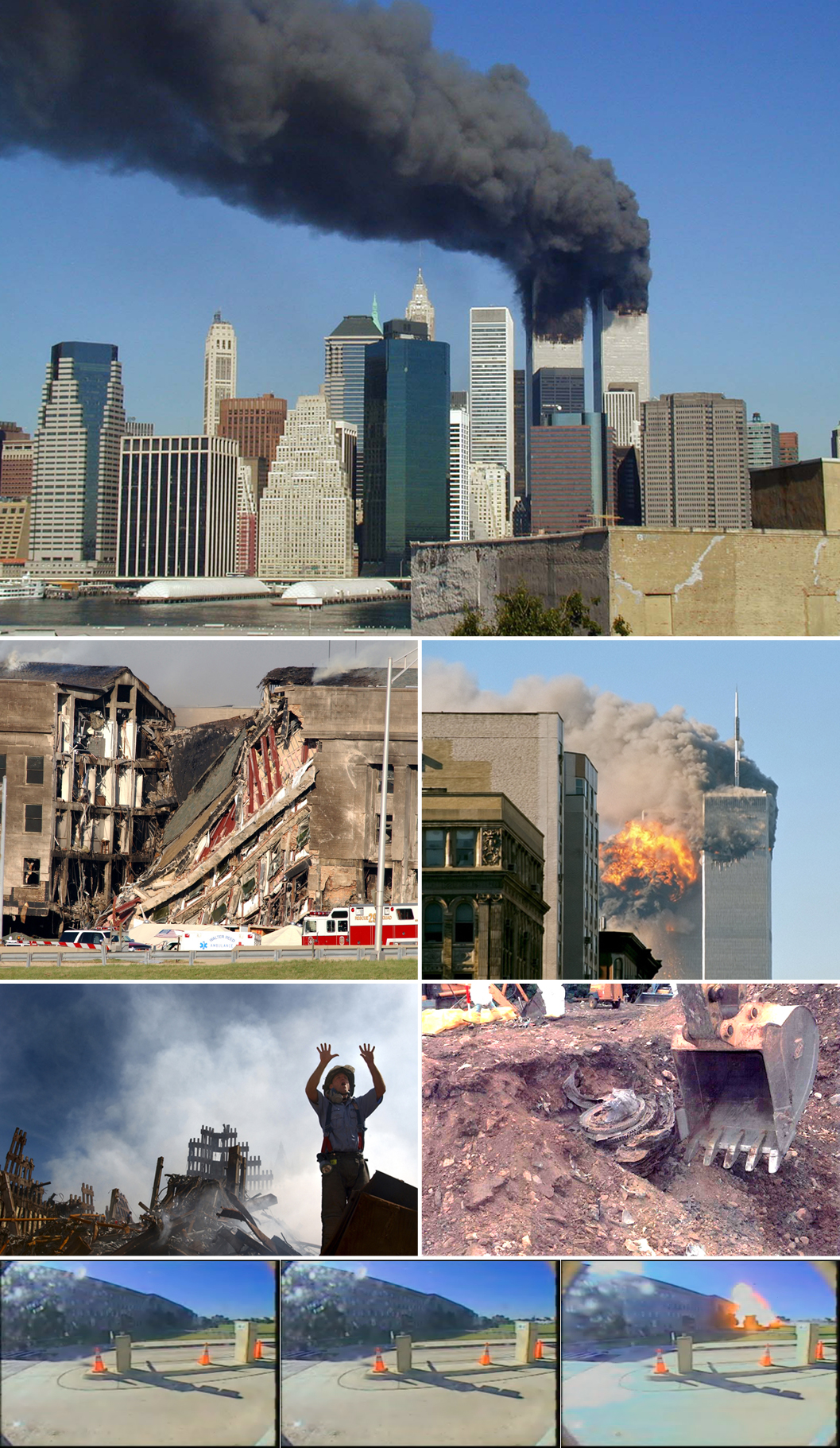
World Trade Center photo montage; a place represented in media images; an example of place-in-media

According to one taxonomy, the geography of media and communication involves four complementary aspects: places-in-media, media-in-places, media-in-spaces and spaces-in-media. Places-in-media are representations of place circulating in all sorts of media for all sorts of reasons, for example landscape paintings signifying the owner's status, and news images of urban spaces linking crime and chaos to minority populations and the poor. Media-in-places are ways in which particular places such as the home, classroom, workplace, or city street are altered functionally and experientially by transformations in how people use media in those places. Media-in-spaces are communication infrastructures, whether historical, like telegraph cables, or contemporary like optical fiber cable when mapped and analyzed in terms of their physical layout. Spaces-in-media are the topologies that symbols, images, information and ideas move through as they spread or diffuse from person to person and from group to group.

== Notable scholars ==
=== Geographers interested in media and communication ===
- Ronald F. Abler
- John A. Agnew
- Paul C. Adams
- Henry Bakis
- Trevor J. Barnes
- Jacquelin Burgess
- Denis Cosgrove
- Tim Cresswell
- Julie Cupples
- Simon Dalby
- Jason Dittmer
- Klaus Dodds
- Peter Gould
- Mark Graham
- Derek Gregory
- Eric Laurier
- Chris Lukinbeal
- Doreen Massey
- John Pickles
- Gillian Rose (Geographer)
- Nigel Thrift
- Yi-Fu Tuan
- Gearóid Ó Tuathail / Gerard Toal
- Gill Valentine
- Philippe Vidal
- Torsten Wissmann
- Stefan Zimmermann

=== Media/communication scholars interested in geography ===
- Manuel Castells
- Elizabeth Eisenstein
- Kevin Glynn
- Harold Innis
- Marshall McLuhan
- Joshua Meyrowitz
- Lewis Mumford
- Walter J. Ong
- Lisa Parks
- Neil Postman
- Mary Louise Pratt
- Saskia Sassen
- Mimi Sheller

== See also ==
- Cultural geography
- Social geography
- Political geography
- Geopolitics
- Urban geography
- Feminist geography
