= Imagined geographies =

Shared social perception of spaces

The concept of imagined geographies (or imaginative geographies) originated from Edward Said, particularly his work on critique on Orientalism. Imagined geographies refers to the perception of a space created through certain imagery, texts, and/or discourses. For Said, imagined does not mean to be false or made-up, but rather is used synonymous with perceived. Despite often being constructed on a national level, imagined geographies also occur domestically in nations and locally within regions, cities, etc.

Imagined geographies can be seen as a form of social constructionism on par with Benedict Anderson's concept of imagined communities. Edward Said's notion of Orientalism is tied to the tumultuous dynamics of contemporary history. Orientalism is often referred to as the West's patronizing perceptions and depictions of the East, but more specifically towards Islamic and Confucian states. Orientalism has also been labeled as the cornerstone of postcolonial studies.

This theory has also been used to critique several geographies created; both historically and contemporarily—two examples are Maria Todorova's work Imagining the Balkans and Edith W. Clowes's book, Russia on the Edge: Imagined Geographies and Post-Soviet Identity. Samuel P. Huntington's Clash of Civilizations has also been criticized as showing a whole set of imagined geographies. Halford Mackinder's theories have also been argued by scholars to be an imagined geography that emphasised the importance of Europe over non-European countries, and asserted the view of the geographical "expert" with the "God's eye view".

== Orientalism ==
In his book Orientalism, Edward Said argued that Western culture had produced a view of the "Orient" based on a particular imagination, popularized through academic Oriental studies, travel writing, anthropology and a colonial view of the Orient. This imagination included painting the orient as feminine- however, Said's view on the gendered nature has been criticized by other scholars due to a limited exploration of the construct.

At a 1993 lecture located at York University, Toronto, Canada, Said stressed the role culture plays in Orientalism-based imperialism and colonialism. By differentiating and elevating a national culture over another a validating process of "othering" is undertaken. This process underlies imagined geographies such as orientalism as it creates a set of preconceived notions for self-serving purposes. In constructing itself as superior, the imperial force or colonizing agent is able to justify its actions as somehow necessary or beneficial to the "other".

Despite the broad scope and effect of orientalism as an imagined geography, it and the underlying process of "othering" are discursive and thereby normalized within dominant, Western societies. It is in this sense that Orientalism may be reinforced in cultural texts such as art, film, literature, music, etc. where one-dimensional and often backwards constructions prevail. A prime source of cinematic examples is the documentary-film Reel Bad Arabs: How Hollywood Vilifies a People. The film demonstrates the process of orientalism centric "othering" within Western films from the silent era to modern classics such as Disney's Aladdin. Inferior, backwards, and culturally stagnate constructions of Oriental "others" become normalized in the minds of Western consumers of cultural texts; reinforcing racist or insensitive beliefs and assumptions.

In Orientalism, Said says that Orientalism is an imagined geography because a) Europeans created one culture for the entirety of the 'Orient', and b) the 'Orient' was defined by text and not by the 'Orient'.

== Theory ==
Said was heavily influenced by French philosopher Michel Foucault, and those who have developed the theory of imagined geographies have linked these together. Foucault states that power and knowledge are always intertwined. Said then developed an idea of a relationship between power and descriptions. Imagined geographies are thus seen as a tool of power, of a means of controlling and subordinating areas. Power is seen as being in the hands of those who have the right to objectify those that they are imagining.

Imagined geographies were mostly based on myth and legend, often depicting monstrous "others". Edward Said elaborates that: “Europe is powerful and articulate; Asia is defeated and distant." Further writers to have been heavily influenced by the concept of imagined geographies including Derek Gregory and Gearóid Ó Tuathail. Gregory argues that the war on terror shows a continuation of the same imagined geographies that Said uncovered. He claims that the Islamic world is portrayed as uncivilized; it is labeled as backward and failing. This justifies, in the view of those imagining, the military intervention that has been seen in Afghanistan and Iraq. Edward Said mentions that when Islam appeared in Europe in the Middle Ages, the response was conservative and defensive. Ó' Tuathail has argued that geopolitical knowledges are forms of imagined geography. Using the example of Halford Mackinder's heartland theory, he has shown how the presentation of Eastern Europe / Western Russia as a key geopolitical region after the First World War influenced actions such as the recreation of Poland and the Polish Corridor in the 1918 Treaty of Versailles.

== See also ==
- Lila Abu-Lughod
- Imagined communities
- India (Herodotus)
- Padaei
