= Guantanamo Bay Museum of Art and History =

The Guantanamo Bay Museum of Art and History
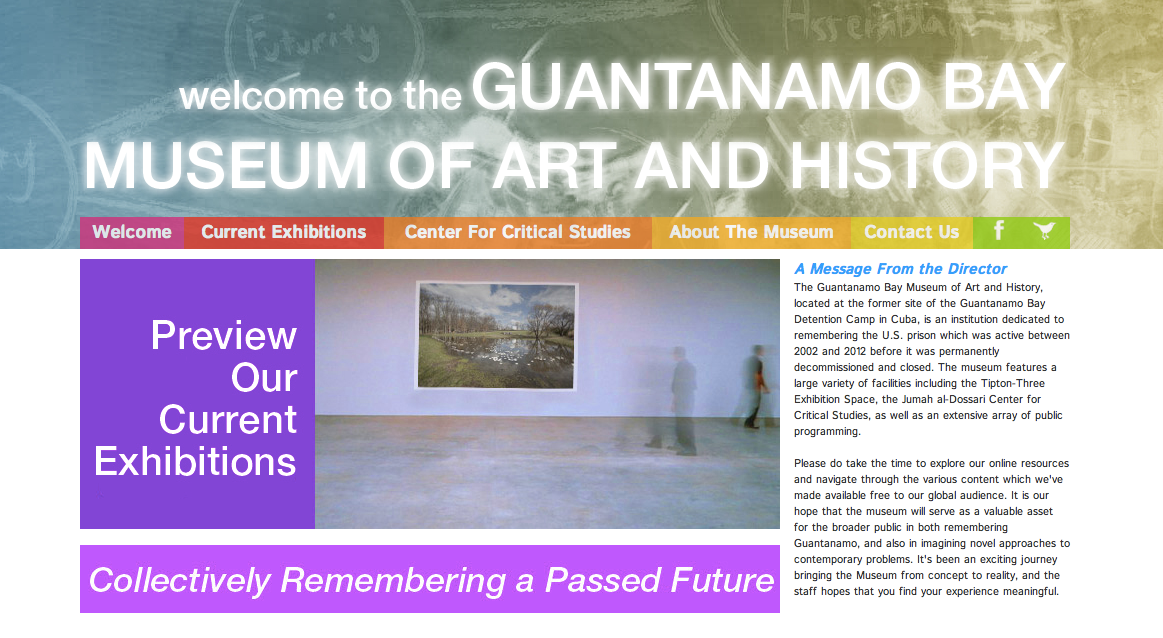
- Established: 2012
- Location: Guantanamo Bay, Cuba
- Website: www.guantanamobaymuseum.org

The Guantanamo Bay Museum of Art and History is a fictional museum created by the American artist Ian Alan Paul. The museum exists virtually as a website and is also installed in real-world galleries in a series of satellite exhibitions. The museum claims to be based in Guantanamo Bay, Cuba at the site of the former Guantanamo Bay Detention Camp which according to the museum's history has been closed since 2012 when the museum was built to replace it.

The museum hosts artistic works in its collection which reflect on and critique the Guantanamo Bay Detention Facility, contains a center for critical studies which collects texts about Guantanamo Bay including essays from Judith Butler and Derek Gregory, and runs an artist in residency program that produces new works for exhibitions. The museum is also listed as a real place on Google Maps just north of the detention facility.

== History ==
When the fictional museum was first made public it was covered by a variety of international publications including by the Agence France-Presse, Studio Magazine, and the Atlantic. The Atlantic described the museum in this way after its opening:

"While creating imaginary entities is a tried-and-true protest technique, its application in this specific case is brilliant. Gitmo is a peculiar invention that only exists thanks to a tangle of legal rulings that allow Americans to pretend that Gitmo is not a part of America, even though it’s governed and controlled by Americans. No one really gets to see the place, as reporters’ and other visitors’ experiences are crafted by the authorities. The detention camp, as a place where people are held and interrogated, remains an imaginary place for all but the prisoners and the national security officials who operate it. The imaginary museum draws its power from this resonance: If Gitmo exists because of one fiction, perhaps it can be closed by another? Or put another (augmented) way, germane to this digital project: if we change Gitmo’s website, can it actually change its physical and legal reality? That’s what the museum’s organizers are hoping."

— Alexis Madrigal, "The Imaginary Art Museum at Gitmo"

After the project's launch, Ian Alan Paul has given lectures and talks at universities, museums, and conferences as the head curator and creator of the museum, and the artworks from the museum are shown in galleries as an extension and elaboration of the project's fiction.
