= Paul C. Adams =

American geographer

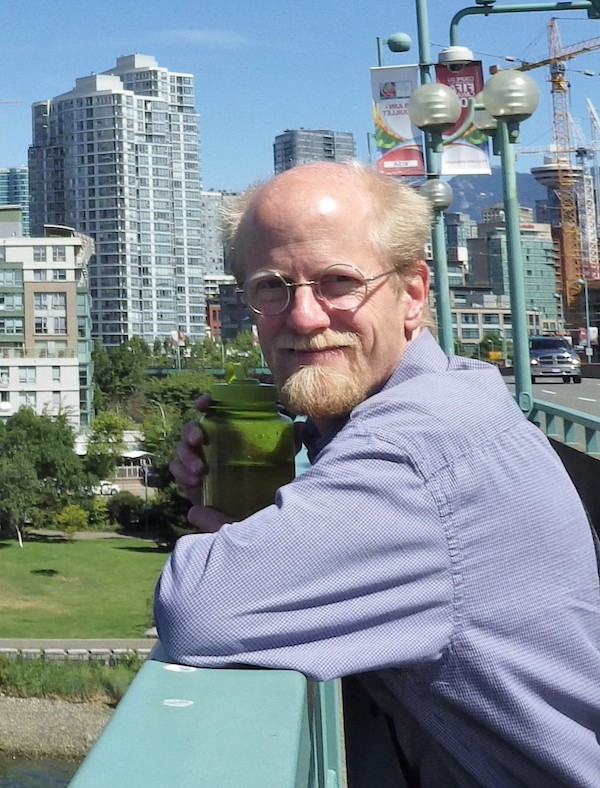
Paul C. Adams

Paul C. Adams is an American geographer who is Professor and Director of Urban Studies at the Department of Geography and the Environment at University of Texas at Austin. Adams applies various approaches from human geography to study media and communication. His research has helped develop the subdiscipline geography of media and communication by integrating studies of place representations, communication infrastructures, social processes, and routines of media use in daily life.

== Education ==
In 1984, Adams received his Bachelor of Environmental Design (with Special Honors) from the University of Colorado at Boulder in Boulder, Colorado. He received his M.S. in Geography in 1990 and his Ph.D. in Geography in 1993, both from the University of Wisconsin-Madison.

== Career ==
Adams specializes in geography of communication technologies, nationalism, critical geopolitics, and representations of space and place. Before arriving at the University of Texas at Austin, Adams had held academic positions at Virginia Tech, the State University of New York at Albany, and Texas A&M University.

He has held visiting research and teaching fellowships at Karlstad University in Sweden, University of Bergen in Norway, and McGill University and Université de Montréal in Quebec. He has also held visiting professor appointments at Johannes Gutenberg University of Mainz, in Germany, and University of Canterbury, in Christchurch, New Zealand.

== Selected publications ==
- Adams, Paul C., 1992. Television as Gathering Place, Annals of the Association of American Geographers 82(1):117-135.
- Adams, Paul C., 1995. A Reconsideration of Personal Boundaries in Space-Time, Annals of the Association of American Geographers 85(2):267-285.
- Adams, Paul C., 1996. Protest and the Scale Politics of Telecommunications, Political Geography 15(5):419-441.
- Adams, Paul C., Barney Warf, 1997. Introduction: cyberspace and geographical space, Geographical Review 87(2):139-145.
- Adams, Paul C., 1997. Cyberspace and Virtual Places "Geographical Review" 87(2):155-171.
- Adams, Paul C., 1998. Network Topologies and Virtual Place Annals of the Association of American Geographers 88(1):88-106.
- Adams, Paul C., 1999. Bringing Globalization Home: A Homeworker in the Information Age, Urban Geography 20(4):356-376.
- Adams, Paul C., 2000. Application of a CAD-based Accessibility Model, Information, Place, and Cyberspace Springer Berlin Heidelberg.
- Adams, Paul C., Steven Hoelscher, and Karen Till, eds., 2001. Textures of Place: Exploring Humanist Geographies. Minneapolis: University of Minnesota Press.
- Adams, Paul C., Rina Ghose, 2003. India.com: The Construction of a Space Between, Progress in Human Geography 27(4):414-437.
- Adams, Paul C., 2004. The September 11 Attacks as Viewed from Quebec: The Small-Nation Myth in Geopolitical Discourse, Political Geography 23 (6): 765-795.
- Adams, Paul C., 2005. The Boundless Self: Communication in Physical and Virtual Spaces, Syracuse, New York: Syracuse University Press.
- Adams, Paul C., 2007. Atlantic Reverberations: French Representations of an American Election, Aldershot, UK: Ashgate Press.
- Adams, Paul C., 2009. Geographies of Media and Communication: A Critical Introduction, London: Wiley-Blackwell.
- Skop, Emily, Paul C. Adams, 2009. Creating and Inhabiting Virtual Places: Indian Immigrants in Cyberspace, National Identities 11(2):127-147. DOI: 10.1080/14608940902891161
- Adams, Paul C., 2011. A Taxonomy for Communication Geography, Progress in Human Geography 35(1):37-57. DOI: 10.1177/0309132510368451
- Adams, Paul C. and André Jansson, 2012. Communication Geography: A Bridge between Disciplines, Communication Theory 22: 298-317. DOI: 10.1111/j.1468-2885.2012.01406.x
- Adams, Paul C., 2012. Multilayered Regionalization in Northern Europe, GeoJournal 77: 293-313. 10.1007/s10708-011-9408-8
- Adams, Paul C., 2012. Trajectories of the Nobel Peace Prize, Geopolitics 17(3): 553-577. DOI:10.1080/14650045.2011.604810
- Adams, Paul C. and Astrid Gynnild, 2013. Communicating Environmental Messages in Online Media: The Role of Place Environmental Communication 7(1): 113-130. DOI:10.1080/17524032.2012.754777
- Adams, Paul C., 2013. Communication in Virtual Worlds, in Oxford Handbook of Virtuality, edited by Mark Grimshaw.
- Gynnild, Astrid and Paul C. Adams, 2013. Animation, Documentary or Interactive Gaming? Exploring Communicative Aspects of Environmental Messaging Online, International Symposium on Online Journalism 3(1): 39-60.
- Adams, Paul C., Jim Craine and Jason Dittmer, eds. 2014. The Ashgate Research Companion to Media Geography, Aldershot, UK: Ashgate Press. ISBN 978-1-4094-4401-5
- Adams, Paul C., 2016. Placing the Anthropocene: A Day in the Life of an Enviro-organism, Transactions of the Institute of British Geographers 41(1): 54-65. DOI:10.1111/tran.12103
- Adams, Paul C., Julie Cupples, Kevin Glynn, André Jansson, & Shaun Moores, 2017. Communications/Media/Geographies, London and New York: Routledge. ISBN 978-1-1388-2434-8
- Adams, Paul C. 2017. Tuanian Geography: A Tale of Contrasts and Nuances. In Place, Space and Hermeneutics, edited by Bruce Janz, pp. 275–288. Springer. ISBN 978-3-319-52214-2
- Adams, Paul C., 2017. Place and Extended Agency. In Distributed Agency: The Sharing of Intention, Cause, and Accountability edited by N. J. Enfield and P. Kockelman, pp. 213–220. Oxford University Press. ISBN 978-0190457211

== See also ==
- Geography of media and communication
