= Luisetti =

Luisetti is an Italian surname. Notable people with the surname include:

- Federico Luisetti (fl. 2005–2017), Italian philosopher
- Hank Luisetti (1916–2002), American college men's basketball player
