= Samuel Finley Breese Morse Medal =

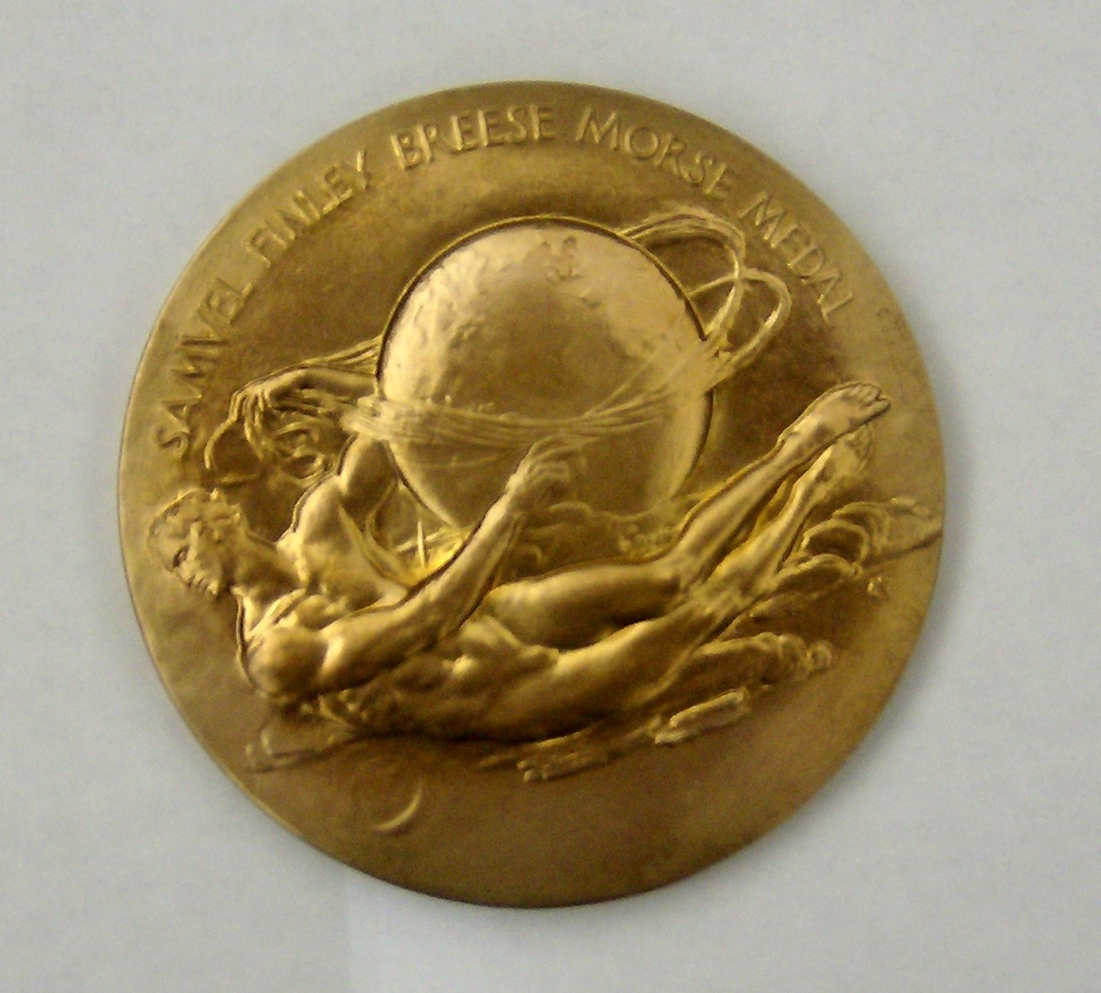
Front

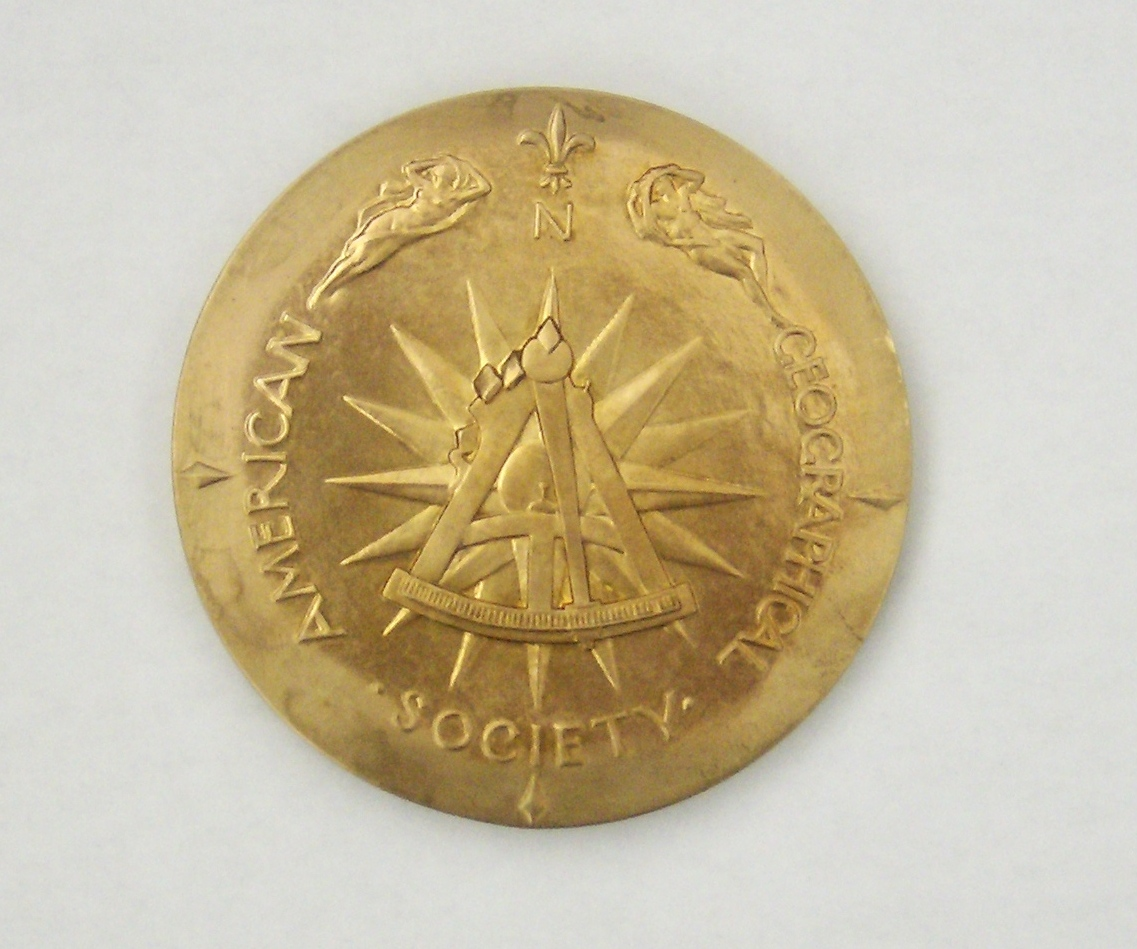
Back

The Samuel Finely Breese Morse Medal was established in 1902. Designed by Laura G. Fraser, this medal is awarded by the American Geographical Society for "achievements and pioneering in geographical research."

== History ==
Samuel Finley Breese Morse was a painter, but also a noted inventor. After extensive travel in Europe, Morse invented the first recording telegraph, which he submitted at patent for in 1837. His system of dots and dashes, equip with a dictionary and words, later was known as Morse Code. After his death on April 2, 1872, the Society was willed funds “for the encouragement of geographical research.”

== Recipients ==
The following people received the award in the year specified:

- 1928: Sir George Hubert Wilkins
- 1945: Archer M. Huntington
- 1952: Gilbert Grosvenor
- 1966: Charles B. Hitchcock
- 1968: Wilma B. Fairchild
- 1975: John A. Noble
- 1986: John C. Weaver
- 1991: Alexander Melamid
- 1999: Donald J. Lloyd-Jones
- 2001: Douglas R. McManis
- 2004: Ronald F. Abler
- 2008: John E. Gould
- 2008: Richard H. Nolte
- 2009: Barbara Borowiecki and William Roselle
- 2018: Christopher Baruth

== See also ==
- List of geography awards
