= John A. Agnew =

British-American political geographer (born 1949)

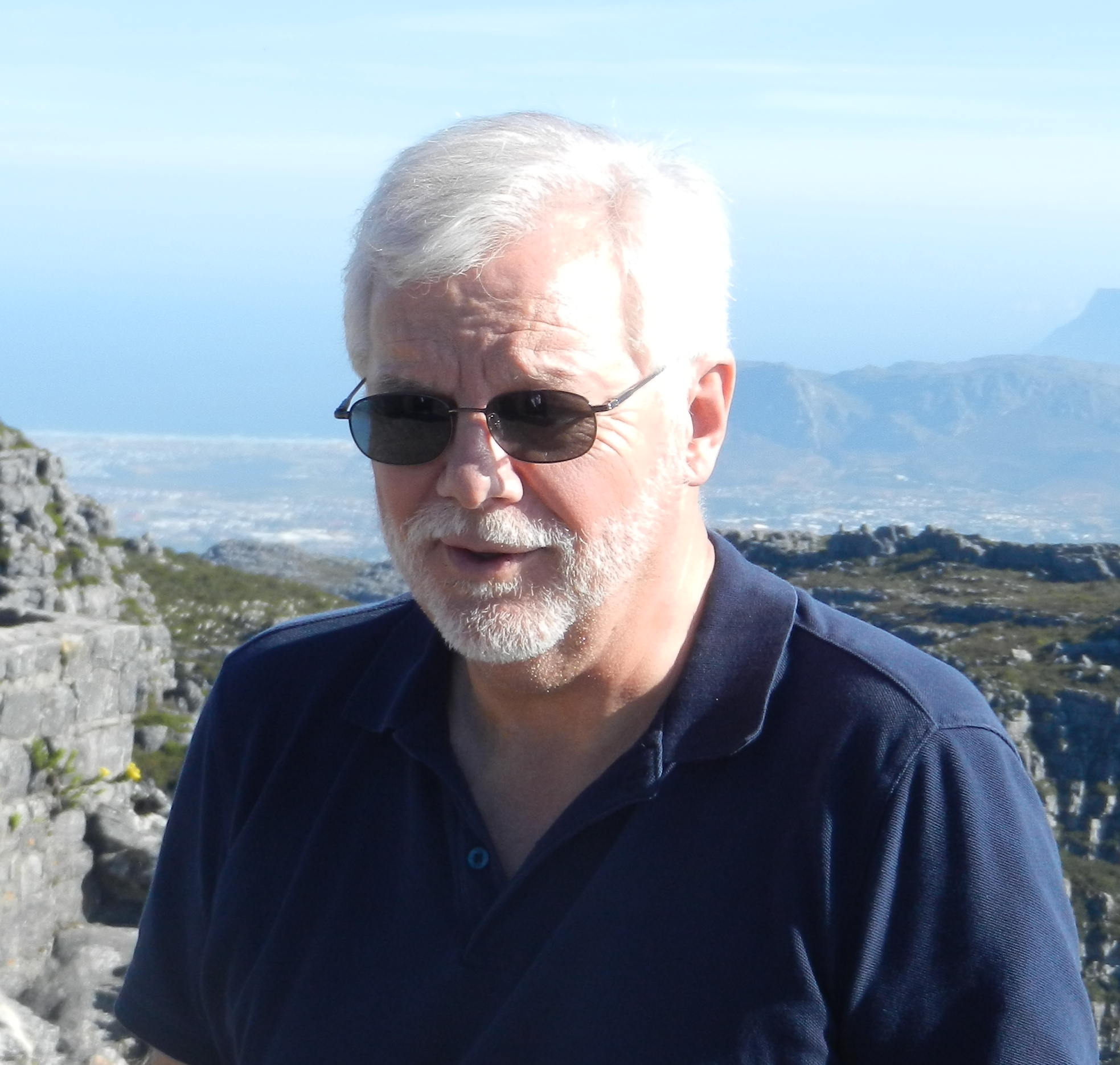
- Agnew in South Africa, 2012
- Born: August 29, 1949 (age 76); Millom, England
- Education: University of Exeter (BA); Ohio State University (MA, PhD)
- Scientific career
- Fields: Political Geography
- Institutions: UCLA

John A. Agnew, FBA (born Millom, England, August 29, 1949) is a British-American political geographer. Agnew was educated at the Universities of Exeter and Liverpool in England and Ohio State in the United States.

== Life and career ==
From 1975 until 1995, he was a professor of geography at Syracuse University in New York. Agnew taught courses on political geography, the history of geography, European cities, and the Mediterranean World. He moved to University of California, Los Angeles (UCLA) in 1995 and he chaired the Department of Geography at UCLA from 1998 to 2002. Agnew retired from UCLA in 2024, and is now Distinguished Professor Emeritus of Geography and Italian at UCLA.

He has written widely on questions of territory, place, and political power. He has also worked on issues of "science" in geography and how knowledge is created and circulates in and across places. He is best known for his work completely reinventing "geopolitics" as a field of study and for his theoretical and empirical efforts at showing how national politics is best understood in terms of the geographical dynamics of "places" and how they are made out of both local and long-distance determinants. One of his best known books is "Place and Politics" (1987). Another is "Geopolitics: Re-Visioning World Politics" (2003). Much of his empirical research involves Italy, Greece, and the United States.

John Agnew was President of the Association of American Geographers, the main professional organization for academic geography in the United States, from 2008 to 2009. He was associate editor of its flagship journal, Annals of the Association of American Geographers and was co-editor of the international journal Geopolitics with David Newman from 1998 to 2009. He was the founding editor-in-chief of the journal, "Territory, Politics, Governance" published by Routledge, from 2011 until 2019.

== Place ==
In Place and Politics (1987), John Agnew contends that for a space to become a 'place', three requirements need to be met :

- A specific location, something that answers the question, 'Where?' in relation to everywhere else.
- A locale - the actual shape of the space, such as defined by the walls in a room or parks and streets in a city, etc. but usually associated with everyday activities (work, recreation, etc.)
- A sense of place - the personal and emotional attachment people have to a place

The focus on place reflects an effort to create a multi-scalar political geography. Agnew sees this as an alternative to the long-dominant state-centrism of the field and better suited than it to the evolving global condition. In this work he tries to do two things: (a) offer a conception of places as geographical settings for political action that are structured by the historical accumulation of local, wider-ranging, and sense-of-place influences and (b) relate the changing character of places with respect to the politics they produce to changes in the wider environment (such as changes in the balance between local and national-state governments, changes in the workings of the world economy, changes in social-class, ethnic, and other social affiliations, and shifts in the meaning and attachments to particular places).

Bringing together research conducted over the previous fifteen years on Italian politics, Place and Politics in Modern Italy (2002), is the most significant development of this perspective since his 1987 book, Place and Politics. It engages with contemporary debates in political theory about rational choice, association, difference, and socialization to provide an alternative geographical perspective that is both attentive to theoretical issues yet immersed in empirical specificity at Italy-wide and local geographical scales. More recently,(2003–2007), Agnew and his colleague Michael Shin have collaborated on an NSF-funded project concerning the transformation of Italian electoral politics between 1987 and 2006 that will further the goal of the research by measuring the geographical dynamics of Italian politics in the country as a whole. The book, Berlusconi's Italy (2008), reports on this particular project.

== Geopolitics ==
Agnew also been actively involved in reformulating on a critical footing the hitherto long-taboo subject among Anglo-American geographers of geopolitics. His 1998 book Geopolitics appeared in a second edition in 2003 and along with the co-authored book Mastering Space (1995), is part of this enterprise. Perhaps his most polished arguments in this area are in Hegemony: The New Shape of Global Power, which won a Choice Award as an Outstanding Academic Title for 2005, and in “Sovereignty Regimes”, a long article that appeared the same year and has been transformed into a book length project, Globalization and Sovereignty (2009) which also won a Choice Outstanding Academic Title Award. Perhaps the three most important themes of this work taken as a whole are (a) the historicization of the idealized state of conventional political theory and geopolitics to the modern era; (b) the role of distinctive geopolitical discourses in different epochs of this era in normalizing the worldview associated with what he calls the state-centered “modern geopolitical imagination;” and (c) the need to take seriously the distinctive contributions to the character of “world order” brought by different hegemonic powers. His work on geopolitical discourse has been a major contribution to the geography of media and communication.

This work has attracted the attention of international relations scholars interested in paying more attention to the ways in which “geography” enters into the theory and practices of “international relations.” Agnew's recent work in this area, specifically on the European origins of the modern state and what this signifies for contemporary statehood in southeastern Europe, was helped by the award of a John Simon Guggenheim Foundation Fellowship for the academic year 2003–2004. The recent article "No Borders, No Nations: Making Greece in Macedonia" (Annals of the Association of American Geographers, 2007) is an important statement of Agnew's perspective on international borders, an important element in the field of geopolitics. His article "Sovereignty Regimes: Territoriality and State Authority in Contemporary World Politics" was published by the Annals of Association of American Geographers, 2005) on the various geographical ways, both territorial and networked, in which sovereignty works other than just the simple mapping of territorial blocs of space long assumed by international relations and international law.

== Remote Sensing and Political Geography ==
In September 2008 Agnew and a group from UCLA evaluated the relative success of the so-called US military surge in Baghdad using night-light satellite information ("Baghdad Nights", Environment and Planning A (2008)). Claiming that the surge merely sealed the fate of Sunni and mixed Sunni/Shia neighborhoods already reduced in population by previous violence, this research received an enormous amount of coverage in the press and the blogosphere, not least from right-wing bloggers in the US defending the Bush-McCain claim that the surge "had worked" but without any sort of empirical information to justify their politically inspired arguments (S. Tavernise and A.W. Lehren, "A grim portrait of civilian deaths in Iraq" New York Times, 22 October 2010)

During early 2009, a team led by Thomas Gillespie and Agnew of UCLA used satellite-aided geographical analysis to pinpoint three compounds in Parachinar [Pakistan] as likely hideouts of the Al-Qaeda leader Osama Bin Laden in 2001. This too received considerable media coverage. Much of this, however, failed to note the ironic tone of the MIT International Review paper (2009), "Finding Bin Laden", reporting the research with its emphasis on why so little effort seemingly had been put into finding the al-Qaeda leader after 2001 and the stake of US governments in keeping the myth of Islamic terrorism going as a basis for an endless new war recapitulating the "success" of the Cold War in mobilizing US identity and formulating a US foreign policy to which others could be recruited.

== Personal ==
John Agnew has two daughters: Katherine Agnew Sommer, who is the owner and head attorney at Sommer Estate Law, PC, located in Los Angeles, and Christine Agnew Brune, an epidemiologist at the CDC in Atlanta. His long-time partner is Felicity Nussbaum, a retired professor of English from UCLA.

== Selected Awards and honors ==
- 2000 Hettner Lectures, University of Heidelberg
- 2003–2004 Guggenheim Award winner
- 2005 Choice Outstanding Title Book Award
- 2006 UCLA Distinguished Teaching Award
- 2006 Distinguished Scholarship Award, Association of American Geographers
- 2009 Choice Outstanding Title Book Award
- 2013 Elected a Fellow of the American Association for the Advancement of Science
- 2019 Vautrin Lud Prize
- 2020 Myron Weiner Distinguished Scholar Award of the International Studies Association
- 2024 Charles P. Daly Medal

In July 2017, Agnew was elected a Corresponding Fellow of the British Academy (FBA), the United Kingdom's national academy for the humanities and social sciences.

In April 2022, Agnew was elected a Member of the American Academy of Arts and Sciences, the US national academy for all fields.

== Selected Books & Articles ==
Hidden Geopolitics: Governance in a Globalized World (2022, Rowman and Littlefield).

- Mapping Populism: Taking Politics to the People (2019, Rowman and Littlefield), co-authored with Michael Shin.
- Handbook of Geographies of Power (2018, Edward Elgar), co-edited with Mathew Coleman.
- "Deus Vult: The Geopolitics of the Catholic Church" (2010, Routledge), Published in: Geopolitics, Volume 15, Issue 1 January 2010, pages 39 – 61
- The SAGE Handbook of Geographical Knowledge (2010, Sage), co-edited with David Livingstone ISBN 978-1-4129-1081-1
- Globalization and Sovereignty (2009, Rowman & Littlefield) ISBN 0-7425-5678-6
- The Geography of the World Economy (6th Edition, 2014, Oxford UP), co-authored with Paul Knox and Linda McCarthy ISBN 0-340-94835-3
- Berlusconi's Italy (2008, Temple UP), co-authored with Michael Shin ISBN 1-59213-717-2
- Politics: Critical Essays in Human Geography (ed) (2008, Ashgate), co-edited with Virginie Mamadouh ISBN 0-7546-2690-3
- Hegemony: The New Shape of Global Power (2005, Temple UP) ISBN 1-59213-153-0
- The Marshall Plan Today (2004, Routledge), co-edited with J. Nicholas Entrikin ISBN 0-7146-5514-7
- Geopolitics: Re-visioning World Politics (2003, 2nd ed. Routledge) ISBN 0-415-31007-5
- A Companion to Political Geography (2003, Blackwell), co-edited with Katharyne Mitchell and Gerard Toal ISBN 978-0-631-22031-2
- American Space/American Place: Geographies of the Contemporary United States (2002, University of Edinburgh Press/Routledge), co-edited with Jonathan Smith ISBN 0-415-93532-6
- Making Political Geography (2002, Arnold/Oxford UP) ISBN 978-0-340-75955-4
- Place and Politics in Modern Italy (2002, University of Chicago Press) ISBN 0-226-01051-1
- Reinventing geopolitics: Geographies of Modern Statehood (2001, Franz Steiner Verlag) ISBN 3-88570-504-4
- Political Geography: A Reader (ed) (1997, Arnold) ISBN 0-470-23655-8
- Human Geography: An Essential Anthology (ed) (1996, Wiley-Blackwell), co-edited with David N. Livingstone and Alisdair Rogers ISBN 978-0-631-19461-3
- Mastering Space (1995, Routledge), co-authored with Stuart Corbridge ISBN 0-415-09434-8
- Rome (1995, Wiley-Blackwell) ISBN 978-0-471-94886-5
- The United States in the World-Economy (1987, Cambridge UP) ISBN 0-521-31684-7
- Place and Politics: The Geographical Mediation of State and Society (1987, Allen & Unwin) ISBN 0-04-320177-6
