= Federico Luisetti =

Italian philosopher

Federico Luisetti is an Italian philosopher, he is associate professor of Italian culture and society at the University of St. Gallen. From 2005 to 2017, he taught Italian studies at the University of North Carolina, Chapel Hill, where he was the chair of the Department of Romance Studies from 2014 to 2017. He is the author of books and essays on philosophy, literature, visual studies, the Avant-gardes, and political thought. He has also worked on decolonial thought and anthropology.

== Publications ==
- The Anomie of the Earth: Philosophy, Politics, and Autonomy in Europe and the Americas, Federico Luisetti, John Pickles, Wilson Kaiser, editors, Duke University Press, 2015
- Una vita. Pensiero selvaggio e filosofia dell’intensità, Mimesis, 2011.
- A Century of Futurism: 1909–2009, Federico Luisetti and Luca Somigli, editors, “Annali d’Italianistica,” 27, 2009
- Estetica dell’immanenza. Saggi sulle parole, le immagini e le macchine, Aracne, 2008. In Italian
- Dopo il museo, Federico Luisetti and Giorgio Maragliano, editors, Trauben, 2006. In Italian
- Plus Ultra. Enciclopedismo barocco e modernità, Trauben, 2001. In Italian
- Museo, Federico Luisetti and Giorgio Maragliano, editors, a special issue of "Rivista di Estetica," ns 16, 1/2001. In Italian
