= Thomas Gillespie (geographer) =

American geographer

- Other name: Tom Gillespie

Academic background
- Education: University of Colorado Boulder (BA); CSU Chico (MA); UCLA (PhD)

Academic work
- Discipline: Geography
- Sub-discipline: Biogeography
- Institutions: UCLA
- Main interests: Tropical dry forests, remote sensing, GIS
- Website: https://geog.ucla.edu/person/thomas-gillespie/

Thomas Gillespie is an American geographer and professor of geography at the University of California, Los Angeles (UCLA).

Gillespie's main area of research is in determining the patterns of species richness within a given geography, specifically native Hawaiian flora and tropical dry forests in biodiversity hotspot such as Hawaii, Sundaland, Indo-Burma, New Caledonia and the Caribbean, through remote sensing and GIS. His research has been used to inform global conservation policies and natural resource/tropical ecology management.

== Education ==
Gillespie received his BA in international affairs from University of Colorado Boulder in 1990 and MA in geography from California State University, Chico in 1994. He went on to receive his PhD from UCLA in 1998.

== Career ==
A 2008 study co-authored by Gillespie suggested that ethnic violence rather than the Iraq War troop surge of 2007 was the "primary factor in reducing violence in Iraq." UCLA researchers looked at light generation at different neighborhoods in Baghdad. Before the surge, Sunni neighborhoods' consumption heavily declined. However, during the surge, their consumption did not return whereas the Shiite neighborhoods either remained the same or increased. Gillespie suggested that “If the surge had truly 'worked,' we would expect to see a steady increase in night-light output over time."

In 2009, Gillespie, along with UCLA geography professor John A. Agnew and several undergraduates, published the paper "Finding Osama bin Laden: An Application of Biogeographic Theories and Satellite Imagery" in the MIT International Review. Using remote sensing and reports of his movement, his students created a statistical model predicting where bin Laden could be based on the island biogeography theory, distance decay theory, and his "Life History Characteristics", a list of physical attributes and assumed personal preferences. The results suggested that bin Laden would be based in a tall building with several rooms, electricity, and coverage in a large city. The research predicated that there was an 88.9% chance that Osama bin Laden would be within 300 km of his last known appearance in Tora Bora. Although the paper did not specify a specific city, Abbottabad, Pakistan, where bin Laden was eventually killed, was within the allotted range at 268 km. Critics have said that the paper oversimplifies bin Laden's behaviors and fails to account for the cultural background of the region.

Gillespie published his documentary about the global loss of natural plant diversity, The World’s Most Endangered Forests: The Tropical Dry Forests of Oceania, on University of California Television (UCTV) in 2010. He spent four years working on the film, traveling to over 40 locations across the Pacific Ocean, with funding by the National Science Foundation and National Geographic Society. Gillespie decided to create a documentary to better expose the subject matter to the general public.

In 2016, Gillespie headed the team along with archeologist Monica L. Smith researching potential sites for Edicts of Ashoka. The edicts are evidence of early political regimes, urbanism, and the spread of Buddhism within the Indian subcontinent. The team used a computer model to extrapolate 121 possible sites, mostly in the Deccan Plateau, Afghanistan-Pakistan border, North West India, based on similarities, such as geological and population data, to existing sites. The paper was published in the Current Science scientific journal.

Gillespie heads the restoration efforts at Sage Hill, a four-acre lot with native shrubbery located on the UCLA campus.
