= Reece Jones (geographer) =

American political geographer

- Education: University of North Carolina, Chapel Hill (BS), University of Wisconsin–Madison (MS, PhD)
- Occupation: Geographer
- Employer: University of Hawaiʻi at Mānoa

Reece Jones (born 1976) is an American political geographer and Guggenheim Fellow.

== Education and career ==
Jones holds a BS in biology from the University of North Carolina at Chapel Hill, a MS (2004) and a PhD (2008) in geography from the University of Wisconsin–Madison.

Jones is currently a professor of geography and environment at the University of Hawaiʻi at Mānoa. He was the president of the Political Geography Specialty Group of the American Association of Geographers from 2014–2015. He is the editor-in-chief of the journal Geopolitics. He is also the co-editor of the Routledge Geopolitics Book Series with Klaus Dodds. He was named a Fellow of the American Association of Geographers in 2023.

== Violent Borders ==
Jones is best known for his work on border walls, the militarization of borders, and the rise in migrant deaths. His book Violent Borders: Refugees and the Right to Move argues that making and enforcing a border is an inherently violent act. The citation for the PolGRG Book Award from the Royal Geographical Society called Violent Borders one of the most "influential political geography books published in recent times." Jones writes for a popular audience through opinion pieces arguing against border walls in The New York Times and for open borders in The Guardian.

== Selected publications ==
- Nobody is Protected: How the Border Patrol Became the Most Dangerous Police Force in the United States (2022, Counterpoint Press) ISBN 978-1-64009-520-5
- White Borders: The History of Race and Immigration in the United States from Chinese Exclusion to the Border Wall (2021, Beacon Press) ISBN 978-0-8070-5406-2
- Open Borders: In Defense of Free Movement (2019, University of Georgia Press) ISBN 978-0-8203-5426-2
- Borders and Mobility in South Asia and Beyond (2018, Amsterdam University Press) Co-edited with Md. Azmeary Ferdoush ISBN 978-94-6298-454-7
- Violent Borders: Refugees and the Right to Move (2016, Verso) ISBN 978-1-78478-471-3
- Placing the Border in Everyday Life (2014, Routledge) Co-edited with Corey Johnson ISBN 978-1-4724-2454-9
- Border Walls: Security and the War on Terror in the United States, India, and Israel (2012, Zed) ISBN 978-1-84813-823-0

== Honors and awards ==
- 2023 Fellow of the American Association of Geographers
- 2021 Guggenheim Fellowship
- 2018 PolGRG Book Award from the Royal Geographical Society for Violent Borders
- 2017 Julian Minghi Distinguished Book Award from the American Association of Geographers for Violent Borders
- 2016 Past Presidents' Gold Book Award from the Association of Borderlands Studies for Placing the Border in Everyday Life
- 2013 Julian Minghi Distinguished Book Award from the American Association of Geographers for Border Walls
- 2012 University of Hawaiʻi Regents Medal for Excellence in Teaching
