= India (Herodotus) =

Herodotus' knowledge of modern India

The inhabited world according to Herodotus (artistic impression, c. 1865)

In ancient Greek geography the basin of the Indus River was on the extreme eastern fringe of the known world. The term "India" (Indikē in Greek) was used by Herodotus and later Greek writers in three different senses: the Achaemenid Persian province Hindush which was at the lower Indus basin (Sindh), the entire Indus land, which contained two other Persian provinces—Thatagush and Gandāra, and the whole of Indian subcontinent. The ethnic term "Indians" (Indoi) was most often used for Indians in the modern sense, represented by physical appearance and cultural markers such as wearing cotton, driving chariots and carrying iron-tipped arrows.

== Etymology ==
The Indus River was called Sindhu in Sanskrit, and the country at the lower Indus basin (modern Sindh in Pakistan) was also called Sindhu. The Persian Achaemenid emperor, Darius the Great, having conquered this country of Sindhu around 513 BC, called it by the Persian equivalent Hinduš (Hindush). The Proto-Iranian sound change *s > h occurred between 850–600 BCE, according to Asko Parpola.

The Ionian dialects of the Greek language dropped the leading aspirate and made the word Indos, which was used for the Indus River as well as the people of Hindush or the people of the Indus Valley in general (Indos in singular, and Indoi in plural). The land (either Hindush or the Indus Valley) was called India or Indike. These terms appear to have been settled before the time of Herodotus, through the writings of Scylax of Caryanda and Hecataeus of Miletus.

== Background ==
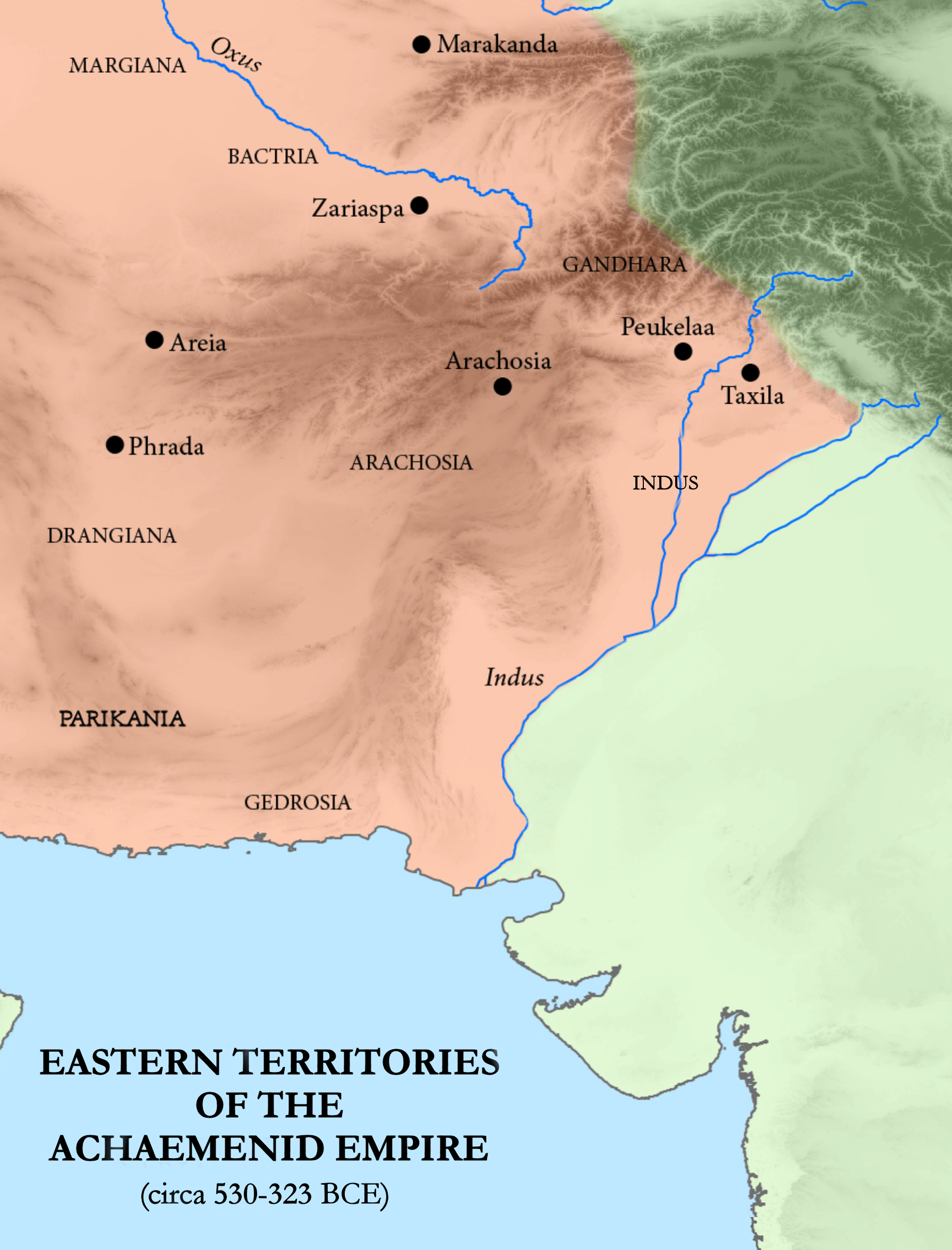
The eastern regions of the Achaemenid Empire (Oxford Atlas of World History, 2002)

Indians and Greeks were brought together under the Persian Achaemenid Empire by the middle of the 6th century BC. By the end of the century, the empire stretched from the Aegean coast of the Mediterranean to the Indus River. The Greek colonies in Asia Minor (present-day Turkey) were already part of the Achaemenid Empire since 546 BC and, thus, the Greeks and Indians came into contact with each other as subjects of the Empire.

According to Herodotus 4.44 the Greek explorer Scylax of Caryanda sailed down the length of the Indus in the service of Darius. Hecataeus of Miletus, around 500 BC, wrote about the geography and peoples of "India", as did the Greek physician Ctesias. Most of these works have not survived in their original form but fragments are known through transmission by later writers. Not only individual Greeks, but also large groups of Greeks were forced to settle in Bactria (northern Afghanistan), who must have had prolonged contact with Indians. Herodotus's account is believed to be based on these accounts.

== Description ==
=== Geography ===
In Herodotus's time, the Greeks (and Persians) were not aware of the geography of India east of the Indus basin. Herodotus in 4.40 uses the term "India" for the Indus basin, and describes it as being on the eastern fringe of the inhabitable world,

"As far as India, Asia is an inhabited land; but thereafter, all to the east is desolation, nor can anyone say what kind of land is there." (trans. A. D. Godley 1920)

But he knew of Indians (Hindwan) living beyond the Persian province of Hinduš (3.101):

"These Indians dwell far away from the Persians southwards, and were no subjects of King Darius." (trans. A. D. Godley 1920)

This reference might be to the people on the west coast of the Indian peninsula, perhaps as far south as Kerala, because there are vivid description of their dark skin.

=== People ===
In book 3 (3.89-97), Herodotus gives some account of the different peoples of India; he describes them as being very diverse, and makes reference to their dietary habits, some eating raw fish, others eating raw meat, and yet others practising vegetarianism. He also mentions their dark skin colour.

"The tribes of Indians are numerous, and they do not all speak the same language—some are wandering tribes, others not. They who dwell in the marshes along the river live on raw fish, which they take in boats made of reeds, each formed out of a single joint. These Indians wear a dress of sedge, which they cut in the river and bruise; afterwards they weave it into mats, and wear it as we wear a breast-plate. Eastward of these Indians are another tribe, called Padaeans, who are wanderers, and live on raw flesh. [...] There is another set of Indians whose customs are very different. They refuse to put any live animal to death, they sow no corn, and have no dwelling-houses. Vegetables are their only food. [...] All the tribes which I have mentioned live together like the brute beasts: they have also all the same tint of skin, which approaches that of the Ethiopians. [...] Besides these, there are Indians of another tribe, who border on the city of Caspatyrus, and the country of Pactyica; these people dwell northward of all the rest of the Indians, and follow nearly the same mode of life as the Bactrians. They are more warlike than any of the other tribes, and from them the men are sent forth who go to procure the gold. For it is in this part of India that the sandy desert lies. Here, in this desert, there live amid the sand great ants, in size somewhat less than dogs, but bigger than foxes. [...]" (trans. Rawlinson)

In 3.38, Herodotus mentions the Indian tribe of the Callatiae for their practice of funerary cannibalism; in a striking illustration of cultural relativism, he points out that this people is just as dismayed at the notion of the Greeks practising cremation as the Greeks are at that of eating their dead parents. In book 7 (7.65,70,86,187) and in 8.113 Herodotus describes the Indian infantry and cavalry employed in Xerxes' army.

== Later developments ==
As the western travellers went into the rest of the subcontinent through the original "India," the name was gradually extended to the outer regions. By the time of Alexander the Great, at least northern India up to the Ganges delta was known, the regions being referred to as Gangaridai (Ganges country) and Prasii/Prasioi (from Sanskrit prācya, the east), all included in "India". After Megasthenes, a Bactrian Greek who spent several years in the court of Magadha, south India was also known, referred to as Pandaia (Pandya country).

Alexander is also reported to have encountered lighter-skinned populations such as the Kalash in present-day Northern Pakistan; specifically the Chitral Valley. Their light complexion is in contrast to the more tanned southern populations described by Herodotus.

By the 3rd century BC, Eratosthenes recognised "India" as terminating in a peninsula (reflecting a first grasp of the geography of the Indian subcontinent). Eratosthenes was also the first Greek author to postulate an island Taprobane at the far south of India, later becoming a name of Sri Lanka. European knowledge of the geography of India did not become much better resolved until the end of Antiquity, and remained at this stage throughout the Middle Ages, only becoming more detailed with the beginning of the Age of Sail in the 15th century.

== See also ==
- Greco-Roman geography
- Early world maps
- Geography of Pakistan
- Names for India
- The Padaei
- Gymnosophists
- Buddhism and the Roman world

== Bibliography ==
- Chakravarti, Ranabir (1982), "Materials Background of Darius I's Invasion of India", Proceedings of the Indian History Congress, 43: 165–170, JSTOR 44141227
- Clarke, Katherine (2018), Shaping the Geography of Empire: Man and Nature in Herodotus' Histories, Oxford University Press, ISBN 9780198820437
- de Jong (1973), "The Discovery of India by the Greeks", Asiatische Studien, 27: 115–142
- Eggermont, Pierre Herman Leonard (1975), Alexander's Campaigns in Sind and Baluchistan and the Siege of the Brahmin Town of Harmatelia, Peeters Publishers, ISBN 978-90-6186-037-2
- Milns, R. D. (2008). "Greek Writers on India Before Alexander". Australian Journal of Politics & History. 35 (3): 353–363. doi:10.1111/j.1467-8497.1989.tb01296.x. ISSN 0004-9522.
- Mukherjee, Bratindra Nath (2001), Nationhood and Statehood in India: A historical survey, Regency Publications, ISBN 978-81-87498-26-1
- Parpola, Asko (2015), The Roots of Hinduism: The Early Aryans and the Indus Civilization, Oxford University Press Incorporated, ISBN 978-0190226923
- Shipley, D. Graham J. (2024), Geographers of the Ancient Greek World: Volume 1: Selected Texts in Translation, Cambridge University Press, ISBN 9781009239868
- Tola, Fernando; Dragonetti, Carmen (1986), "India and Greece before Alexander", Annals of the Bhandarkar Oriental Research Institute, 67 (1/4): 159–194, JSTOR 41693244
- Vogelsang, W. (1990), "The Achaemenids and India, Two Worlds in Contact", in Heleen Sancisi-Weerdenburg; Amelie Kuhrt (eds.), Centre and Periphery: Proceedings of the Groningen 1986 Achaemenid History Workshop, pp. 93–, ISBN 978-90-6258-404-8 – via archive.org
