= Yi-Fu Tuan =

Chinese-American geographer (1930–2022)

- 段義孚
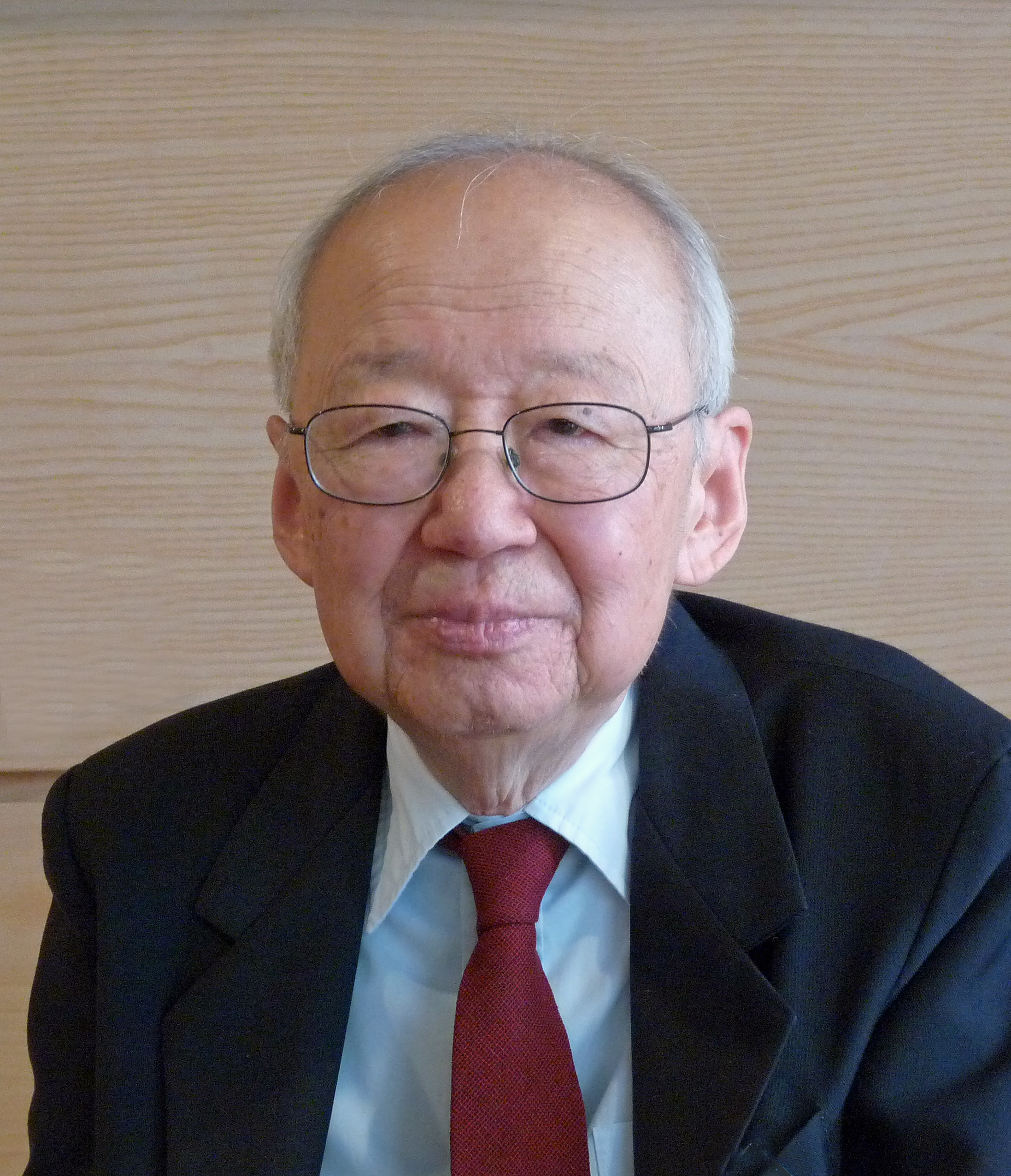
- Tuan in 2012
- Born: December 5, 1930; Tianjin, China
- Died: August 10, 2022 (aged 91); Madison, Wisconsin, U.S.
- Citizenship: American
- Education: University College, Oxford (BA, MA); University of California, Berkeley (PhD)
- Occupation: Geographer

Yi-Fu Tuan (Chinese: 段義孚; December 5, 1930 – August 10, 2022) was a Chinese-born American geographer and writer. He was one of the key figures in human geography and an important originator of humanistic geography.

== Early life and education ==
Born in 1930 in Tianjin, China to an upper-class family, he was educated in China, Australia, the Philippines and the United Kingdom. He attended University College London, but later moved to the University of Oxford, where he graduated from University College, Oxford, with a B.A. and M.A. in 1951 and 1955, respectively. From there, he went to California to continue his geographic education. He received his Ph.D. in 1957 from the University of California, Berkeley.

== Career ==
Tuan taught at the University of New Mexico from 1959 to 1965. From New Mexico, he moved to Toronto, teaching from 1966 to 1968 at the University of Toronto. He became a full professor at the University of Minnesota in 1968. In the same year, he received a Guggenheim Fellowship. It was while he was at Minnesota that he became known for his work in humanistic geography, but his forays into this approach began earlier with an article on topophilia that appeared in the journal Landscape. In a 2004 "Dear Colleague" letter, he described the difference between human geography and humanistic geography:

Human geography studies human relationships. Human geography's optimism lies in its belief that asymmetrical relationships and exploitation can be removed, or reversed. What human geography does not consider, and what humanistic geography does, is the role [relationships] play in nearly all human contacts and exchanges. If we examine them conscientiously, no one will feel comfortable throwing the first stone. As for deception, significantly, only Zoroastrianism among the great religions has the command, "Thou shalt not lie." After all, deception and lying are necessary to smoothing the ways of social life. From this, I conclude that humanistic geography is neglected because it is too hard. Nevertheless, it should attract the tough-minded and idealistic, for it rests ultimately on the belief that we humans can face the most unpleasant facts, and even do something about them, without despair.

After 14 years at the University of Minnesota, he moved to Madison, Wisconsin and continued his professional career at University of Wisconsin–Madison as the J.K. Wright and Vilas Professor of Geography (1985–1998). He was elected a fellow of the American Association for the Advancement of Science in 1986, of the British Academy in 2001 and of the American Academy of Arts and Sciences in 2002. Tuan was awarded the Cullum Geographical Medal by the American Geographical Society in 1987 and the Vautrin Lud Prize in 2012.

After Tuan became an emeritus professor of the University of Wisconsin-Madison, he would still occasionally gave lectures, continue to write his "Dear Colleague" letters and to publish new books on geosophy. His most recent books are Human Goodness (2008) and Religion: From Place to Placelessness (2010). He resided in Madison, Wisconsin.

== Personal life ==
Yi-Fu Tuan stayed single throughout his life. In his autobiography, Tuan revealed his gay sexuality for the first time:

As a schoolboy in Australia, I was drawn to another boy. But no alarm bell rang, for other boys ... were also drawn to him. ... But my feeling toward another boy, an athlete with the sleek beauty of a well-oiled machine, was another matter. I couldn't persuade myself even then that it was just displaced longing for female loveliness. ... I was then fifteen.

Tuan did not focus on either his ethnicity or his sexual orientation in his research. Rather than stress axes of difference or social power relations, he attempted to capture universal human experiences. He worked to show nuances of common phenomena such as the experience of "home" that cut across cultural divides even as they reveal distinct manifestations in different places and times.

Tuan died on August 10, 2022, at the age of 91.

== Key ideas and approaches ==
=== Humanism ===
Tuan described his approach as humanist, however his humanism does not entail replacing spirituality with rationalism or promoting human beings as wholly self-directed. Instead, he saw humanist geography as a way to reveal "how geographical activities and phenomena reveal the quality of human awareness" and to show "human experience in its ambiguity, ambivalence, and complexity". To do so requires empathy, and for this he sought assistance from literature, the arts, history, biography, social science, philosophy, and theology. Tuan's approach is qualitative, but more narrative and descriptive than philosophical, in light of his concern that a philosophical theory can become "so highly structured that it seems to exist in its own right, to be almost 'solid,' and thus able to cast (paradoxically) a shadow over the phenomena it is intended to illuminate" whereas he prefers for theories to "hover supportively in the background."

=== Contradictions and paradoxes ===
Tuan was most interested in ambivalent human experiences that resonate with the opposing pulls of space and place, the intimate and the distant. His approach is suggested by titles such as Segmented Worlds and Self, Continuity and Discontinuity, Morality and Imagination, Cosmos and Hearth, Dominance and Affection, and above all, Space and Place. These existential dialectics propel people between a pole of experience characterized by rootedness, security and grounding, on the one hand, and a pole characterized by outreach, potentiality and expansiveness, on the other hand. These opposites interact: there is a certain distance in what is nearby and a certain nearness in what is far away. Therefore, ambivalence is the norm when it comes to the human experience of dwelling in the world with its existential pulls between space and place, mobility and stasis, the distant view and embodied engagement.

=== Optimism ===
Tuan was fundamentally an optimist. Even Tuan's gloomiest book, Landscapes of Fear, concludes that things were worse in the past. For Tuan, historical changes have been for the better overall: "In the larger view, the human story is one of progressive sensory and mental awareness ... culture, through laborious and labyrinthine paths traversed over millennia, has greatly and variedly refined our senses and mind." Progress itself depends on particular ways of dealing with the tensions between space and place, cosmos and hearth, dominance and affection, morality and imagination. The promise of the future lies in recognizing the existential poles of nearness and remoteness and how they are reflected in each other.

=== Constructionism ===
Tuan foregrounded the importance of language in the making of place. Throughout his works, texts such as poems, novels, letters, and myths are understood as integral elements in the creation of a sense of place. Human communications form the basis for the social processes of imagining, understanding, planning and conceiving places. Representations guide the human and material interactions creating, sustaining, and destroying places. Tuan's deep reflection on the role of representation in the creation of place forms an important foundation for the geography of media and communication.

== Selected bibliography ==
- Romantic Geography: In Search of the Sublime Landscape. 2013. University of Wisconsin Press, Madison, WI. ISBN 978-0-299-29680-3
- Humanist Geography: An Individual's Search for Meaning. 2012. George F. Thompson Publishing, Staunton, VA. ISBN 978-0-9834978-1-3
- Religion: From Place to Placelessness. 2010. Center for American Places, Chicago, IL. ISBN 978-1-930066-94-6
- Human Goodness. 2008. University of Wisconsin Press, Madison, WI. ISBN 978-0-299-22670-1
- Coming Home to China. 2007. University of Minnesota Press, Minneapolis, MN. ISBN 0-8166-4992-8
- Place, Art, and Self. 2004. University of Virginia Press, Santa Fe, NM, in association with Columbia College, Chicago, IL. ISBN 1-930066-24-4.
- Dear Colleague: Common and Uncommon Observations. 2002. University of Minnesota Press, Minneapolis, MN. ISBN 0-8166-4055-6.
- Who am I?: An Autobiography of Emotion, Mind, and Spirit. 1999. University of Wisconsin Press, Madison, WI. ISBN 0-299-16660-0.
- Escapism. 1998. Johns Hopkins University Press, Baltimore, MD. ISBN 0-8018-5926-3.
- Cosmos and Hearth: A Cosmopolite's Viewpoint. 1996. University of Minnesota Press, Minneapolis, MN. ISBN 0-8166-2730-4.
- Passing Strange and Wonderful: Aesthetics, Nature, and Culture. 1993. Island Press, Shearwater Books, Washington, DC. ISBN 1-55963-209-7.
- Morality and Imagination: Paradoxes of Progress. 1989. University of Wisconsin Press, Madison, WI. ISBN 0-299-12060-0.
- The Good Life. 1986. University of Wisconsin Press, Madison, WI. ISBN 0-299-10540-7.
- Dominance and Affection: The Making of Pets. 1984. Yale University Press, New Haven, CT. ISBN 0-300-03222-6.
- Segmented Worlds and Self: Group Life and Individual Consciousness. 1982. University of Minnesota Press, Minneapolis, MN. ISBN 0-8166-1109-2.
- Landscapes of Fear. 1979. Pantheon Books, New York, NY. ISBN 0-394-42035-7.
- Space and Place: The Perspective of Experience. 1977. University of Minnesota Press, Minneapolis, MN. ISBN 0-8166-0808-3.
- Topophilia: a study of environmental perception, attitudes, and values. 1974. Prentice-Hall, Englewood Cliffs, NJ. ISBN 0-13-925248-7.
- The Climate of New Mexico. 1973. State Planning Office, Santa Fe, NM.
- Man and Nature. 1971. Association of American Geographers, Washington, DC. Resource paper #10.
- "China." 1970. In The World's Landscapes. Harlow, Longmans. ISBN 0-582-31153-5.
- The Hydrologic Cycle and the Wisdom of God. 1968. University of Toronto, Toronto, Ont. ISBN 978-0-8020-3214-0.
