= Ronald F. Abler =

American geographer (born 1939)

Ron Abler
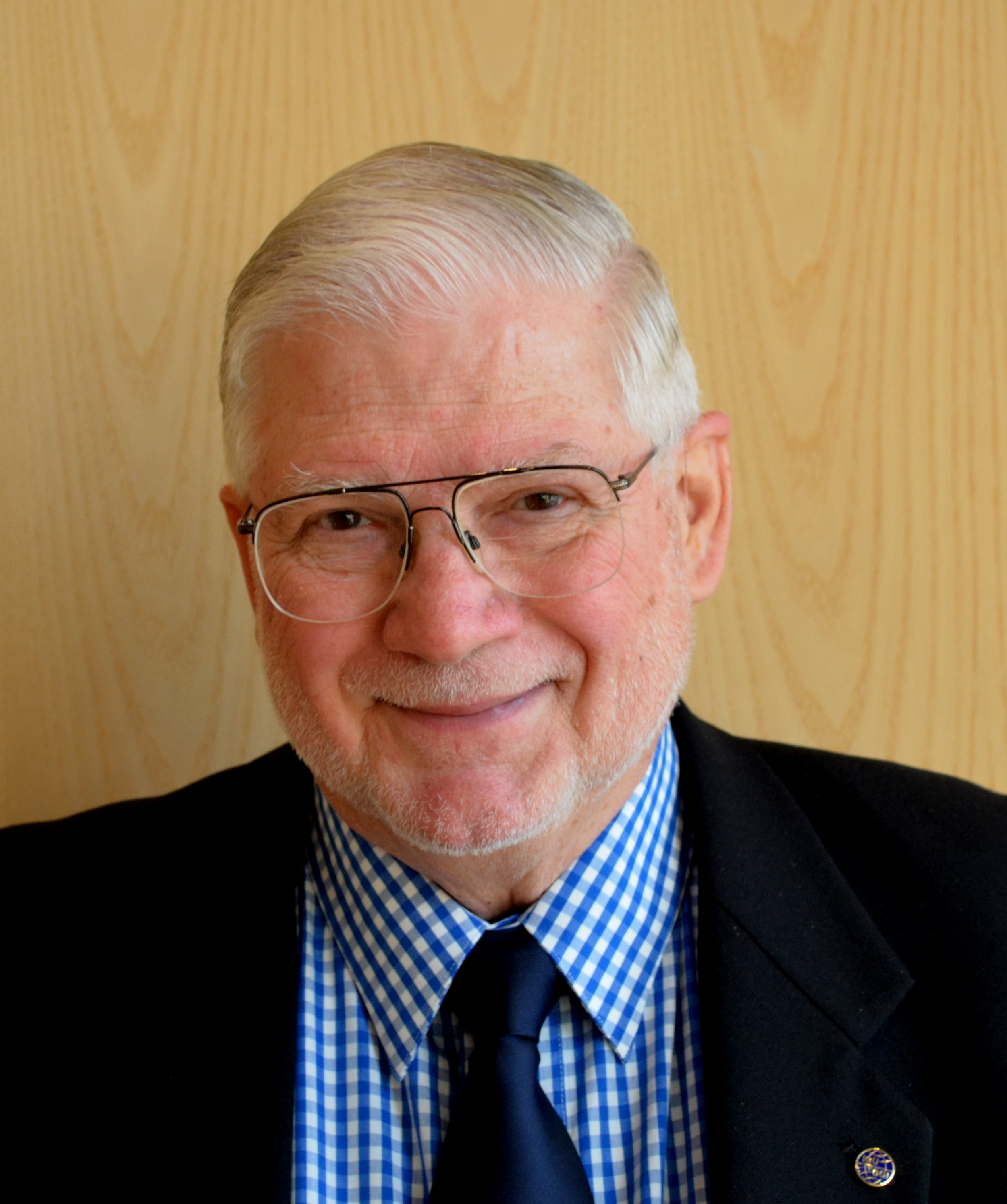
- Born: Ronald Francis Abler; May 30, 1939 (age 87); Milwaukee
- Education: University of Minnesota
- Known for: 1971 textbook on spatial organization; Geography of media and communication
- Scientific career
- Fields: Geography
- Workplaces: Pennsylvania State University

Ronald Francis (Ron) Abler (born May 30, 1939) is an American geographer at Pennsylvania State University and an Elected Fellow of the American Association for the Advancement of Science.

Abler obtained his PhD in 1968 from the University of Minnesota, where he had started his academic career as faculty member in 1967.

Abler served as president of the American Association of Geographers in 1985–86, and as president of the International Geographical Union from 2008 to 2012. He is a recipient of the Samuel Finley Breese Morse Medal and the Victoria Medal.

Abler is a key early figure in the development of geography of media and communication.

== Selected publications ==
- Abler, R. F., J. Adams, and P. Gould. Spatial organization: the geographer's view of the world. Englewood Cliffs, 1971.

=== Articles, a selection ===
- Abler, Ronald F. "The geography of communications." Transportation geography: Comments and readings (1974): 327–345.
- Abler, Ronald F. "The national science foundation national center for geographic information and analysis." International Journal of Geographical Information System 1.4 (1987): 303–326.
- Abler, Ronald F. "What shall we say? To whom shall we speak?." Annals of the Association of American Geographers 77.4 (1987): 511–524.
- Abler, Ronald F. "Awards, rewards, and excellence: Keeping geography alive and well." The Professional Geographer 40.2 (1988): 135–140.
- Abler, Ronald F. "Everything in its place: GPS, GIS, and geography in the 1990s." The Professional Geographer 45.2 (1993): 131–139.
