= Monica L. Smith =

American archaeologist and anthropologist

- Title: Professor and Navin and Pratima Doshi Chair in Indian Studies in the Department of Anthropology at the University of California, Los Angeles

Academic background
- Education: University of Michigan

Academic work
- Discipline: Archaeologist
- Main interests: Ancient cities and their household activities

Monica Louise Smith is an American archaeologist, anthropologist, and historian of ancient cities and their household activities. She is Professor and Navin and Pratima Doshi Chair in Indian Studies in the Department of Anthropology at the University of California, Los Angeles.

== Education and career ==
Smith graduated summa cum laude with a bachelor's degree in classical civilization from the University of California, Santa Barbara in 1985. She earned a master's degree in archaeology from the University of California, Los Angeles in 1988 and completed her Ph.D. in anthropology at the University of Michigan in 1997.

After postdoctoral work at the University of Arizona, Southern Methodist University, and the Smithsonian Institution, she became an assistant professor at the University of Pittsburgh in 2000. She returned to the University of California, Los Angeles as a faculty member in 2002.

In 2016, Smith along with geographer Thomas Gillespie researched potential sites for Edicts of Ashoka. The edicts are evidence of early political regimes, urbanism, and the spread of Buddhism within the Indian subcontinent. The team used a computer model to extrapolate 121 possible sites, mostly in the Deccan Plateau, Afghanistan-Pakistan border, North West India, based on similarities, such as geological and population data, to existing sites. The paper was published in the Current Science scientific journal.

Smith is a member of the Editorial Advisory Board of the archaeology journal Antiquity.

== Books ==
Smith is the author of books including:

- The Archaeology of an Early Historic Town in Central India (British Archaeological Reports, 2001)
- The Historic Period at Bandelier National Monument (National Park Service 2002)
- A Prehistory of Ordinary People (University of Arizona Press, 2010)
- Cities: The First 6,000 Years (Penguin/Random House, 2019)

Her edited volumes include:

- The Social Construction of Ancient Cities (Smithsonian Institution Press, 2003)
- Abundance: The Archaeology of Plenitude (University Press of Colorado, 2017)

== See also ==
- Societal collapse
