= József Böröcz =

Hungarian American sociologist

József Böröcz (born 1956, Budapest, Hungary) is a historical sociologist, emeritus Professor of Sociology at Rutgers University since July 1, 2024. He earned his PhD in sociology at Johns Hopkins University in 1992. He has a Dr. Sc. degree from the Hungarian Academy of Sciences (2004). According to Google Scholar, Böröcz's H-Index score is 32.

== Life ==
József Böröcz grew up in Budapest, Hungary. He attended Petőfi Gimnázium. He studied literature, linguistics, culture theory, as well as Polish at Kossuth Lajos University of Sciences in Debrecen between 1976 and 1982. As a student in Hungary, he published on the sociology of tourism both in Hungarian and English.

After graduation, he worked for a year in Budapest as a freelance translator from English. In September 1983, he became a Hungarian-as-ancestral-language instructor in the elementary and high schools of Albany, Louisiana. During his two years in Louisiana, he attended the PhD-Program in Sociology at Louisiana State University in Baton Rouge.

In 1985, he returned to Budapest and became research associate at one of Hungary's leading empirical social science research institutions at the time, the Mass Communication Research Center. He continued his PhD-training in the Program in Comparative International Development in the Department of Sociology at Johns Hopkins University in 1986, where he soon became an academic advisee of, and research assistant to, Alejandro Portes. With Portes, he worked on issues of international labor migration. His dissertation examined the effects of international tourism on socioeconomic, political and cultural life, through on a world-historical perspective, a European overview, and an Austro-Hungarian comparison. He received his PhD in 1992. In 2004, he earned his Dr.Sc. degree in sociology at the Hungarian Academy of Sciences.

From 1992 to 1995, he was assistant professor of sociology at the University of California, Irvine.

He joined Rutgers University in 1995 as senior faculty in the Department of Sociology and Director of Rutgers' newly established Institute for Hungarian Studies. He passed on the directorship of the institute in 2007. At the Department of Sociology at Rutgers, he founded the Political and Economic Sociology area in 1996 and was one of the co-founders of the Global Structures area in 2012. He became emeritus Professor on July 1, 2024.

== Recognition ==
- Knight Cross of the Merit of Honor of the Republic of Hungary 2005. He renounced the award in protest due to the government honoring a racist journalist.
- Immanuel Wallerstein Chair in Global Ethics for 2005–2006, University of Ghent, Belgium
- Hungarian Heritage Award 1998
- Honorable Mention, "The European Union and Global Social Change", book award competition of the Political Economy of the World-System section of the American Sociological Association
- "For József Böröcz Being 60." Online Festschrift for 60th Birthday
- Radnóti Miklós Collective Anti-Racism Award of the Hungarian Federation of Anti-Fascists and Resistance Fighters 2017
- Senior Fulbright Researcher at the Robert Zajonc Institute for Social Studies at the University of Warsaw, Poland, September 2019 - June 2020

== Books ==
- David A. Smith and József Böröcz (eds.) 1995. A New World Order? Global Transformation in the Late 20th Century. Greenwood Press (A Praeger Imprint). Hard cover and paperback.
- József Böröcz. 1996. Leisure Migration: A Sociological Study on Tourism. Oxford, UK: Pergamon Press (An Elsevier Science Imprint). Hard cover.
- József Böröcz and Melinda Kovács (eds.). 2001. Empire’s New Clothes: Unveiling EU-Enlargement. E-Book, a Central Europe Review imprint. , 3 December. ISBN 1-84287-009-2. Hungarian version: Böröcz József és Kovács Melinda (szerk.). 2001. EU-birodalom. Thematic bloc in Replika. 45-46 (November): 23–151.
- József Böröcz. 2009, 2010. The European Union and Global Social Change: A Critical Geopolitical-Economic Analysis. Oxford, UK: Routledge. Hardback and e-book: 2009 and 2010; paperback: 2010.
- Ángel Ferrero, József Böröcz, Corina Tulbure y Roger Suso. 2014. El último europeo: Imperialismo, xenofóbia y la derecha radical en la Unión Europea. (In Spanish.) Madrid: La oveja roja.
- Böröcz József. 2017. Hasított fa. A világrendszer-elmélettől a globális struktúraváltásokig (In Hungarian). Budapest: l’Harmattan.
- Böröcz József. 2018. Az EU és a világ. Kritikai elemzés. (In Hungarian). Budapest: Pesti Kalligram.
- Böröcz József és Fáber Ágoston (szerk.). 2021. Ott kívül a magyarázat. Társadalomkritikai beszélgetések Böröcz Józseffel. (In Hungarian). Budapest: Eszmélet zsebkönyvtár.
- Böröcz József. 2026. Hát ez ilyen. Budapest: Gondolat.
