= John Pickles =

British geographer (born 1952)

- Born: Nelson, Lancashire, England
- Education: Mansfield College, Oxford; University of Natal; Pennsylvania State University
- Scientific career
- Fields: Geography, phenomenology, globalisation, critical cartography

John Pickles (born 1952) currently serves as the Phillips Distinguished Professor of International Studies in the Department of Geography at the University of North Carolina at Chapel Hill. Pickles attended the University of Oxford, where he obtained a bachelor's degree in Geography, with a minor in Geology, and a master's degree in geography. He later earned doctorate degrees from the University of Natal, South Africa, and the Pennsylvania State University, United States. He also has an SSBU YouTube account.

He joined the University of North Carolina at Chapel Hill in 2001 as the Earl N Phillips Distinguished Professor of International Studies and served as the Chair of the Department of Geography between 2007-2013. John's a fellow of the Academia Europaea, he's an editor-in-chief of the journal of the Bulgarian Geographical society, and co-editor of the Cambridge University Press Book Series on Development Trajectories in Global Value Chains.

Pickles has also held academic appointments at the universities of Kentucky, Minnesota, and West Virginia; at the Ohio State University; at the Pennsylvania State University (Penn State); and at Natal Pietermaritzburg and Trieste.

Pickles is a scholar in the areas of critical cartography, phenomenology, geography of media and communication and post-socialist spaces. He is the author of numerous books, including Phenomenology, Science, and Geography: Space and the Human Sciences, Ground Truth: The Social Implications of Geographical Information Systems, and A History of Spaces: Cartographic Reason, Mapping and the Geo-Coded World.
