= Journal of Contemporary European Studies =

Area studies journal

- Discipline: European studies
- Language: English
- Edited by: Martin Bull

Publication details
- Former names: Journal of European Area Studies, Journal of Area Studies, Journal of Area Studies: Series 1
- History: 1980–present
- Publisher: Routledge
- Frequency: Quarterly
- Impact factor: 0.909 (2019)

Standard abbreviations
- ISO 4: J. Contemp. Eur. Stud.

Indexing
- ISSN: 1478-2804 (print); 1478-2790 (web)
- LCCN: 2011200156
- OCLC no.: 818197341

Links
- Journal homepage; Online access; Online archive

The Journal of Contemporary European Studies is a quarterly peer-reviewed academic journal that covers European studies. It was established in 1980 as the Journal of Area Studies: Series 1 and renamed Journal of Area Studies in 1992. In 1999 it was again renamed as the Journal of European Area Studies, before obtaining its current name in 2003. It is published by Routledge and the editor-in-chief is Martin Bull (University of Salford)

== Abstracting and indexing ==
The journal is abstracted and indexed in:

- Current Contents/Social and Behavioral Sciences
- EBSCO databases
- International Bibliography of Periodical Literature
- International Bibliography of the Social Sciences
- Modern Language Association Database
- ProQuest databases
- Scopus
- Social Sciences Citation Index

According to the Journal Citation Reports, the journal has a 2019 impact factor of 0.909.
