= Gerard Toal =

Irish geographer

Gerard Toal (Irish: Gearóid Ó Tuathail; born 1962 in Ireland) is Professor of Government and International Affairs at Virginia Polytechnic Institute and State University.

== Career ==
Toal holds a B.A. in History and Geography from National University of Ireland, Maynooth, an M.A. in Geography from the University of Illinois at Urbana-Champaign (1984), and a Ph.D. in Political Geography from Syracuse University (1989).

He served for ten years as an Assistant Professor of Geography at Virginia Tech in Blacksburg, before establishing the Government and International Affairs program in the School of Public and International Affairs. He has held fellowships at the Copenhagen Peace Research Institute, and the Center for International Studies at the University of Southern California.

Toal has authored, co-authored, and/or edited eight books. Bosnia Remade: Ethnic Cleansing and Its Reversal, co-authored with Dr Carl Dahlman, won the Julian Minghi Book Prize from the Political Geography Specialty Group. Near Abroad: Putin, the West, and the Contest over Ukraine and the Caucasus won the ENMISA Distinguished Book Award from the International Studies Association in 2019.

He has served as an associate editor for the academic journals Geopolitics and Eurasian Geography and Economics. He currently serves on the editorial board of Political Geography, Eurasian Geography and Economics, Nationalities Papers and Communist and Post-Communist Studies.

His research specializations include critical geopolitics, nationalism, political geography, post-Communism, globalization, territorial disputes, and discourse analysis. He has published on various field research projects in Bosnia-Herzegovina, Georgia, Armenia, Moldova, and Ukraine.

In 2005, Toal testified before the United States Congress on political developments in Bosnia-Herzegovina.

== Selected books ==
- G. Toal, Near Abroad: Putin, the West, and the Contest over Ukraine and the Caucasus Oxford University Press, 2017.
- G. Toal, C. Dahlman, Bosnia Remade: Ethnic Cleansing and its Reversal. Oxford University Press, 2011.
- G. Ó Tuathail, S. Dalby and P. Routledge, The Geopolitics Reader. Second edition. Routledge, 2006.
- J. Agnew, K. Mitchell and G. Toal, eds. A Companion to Political Geography. Blackwell, 2004.
- S. Dalby and G. Ó Tuathail, eds., Rethinking Geopolitics. Routledge, 1998.
- G. Ó Tuathail, S. Dalby and P. Routledge, The Geopolitics Reader. First edition. Routledge, 1998.
- A. Herod, G. Ó Tuathail and S. Roberts, eds. An Unruly World? Geography, Globalization and Governance. Routledge, 1998.
- G. Ó Tuathail, Critical Geopolitics: The Politics of Writing Global Space. Minneapolis: University of Minnesota Press (Volume 6 in the Borderlines series) and London: Routledge, 1996.
