= Eurasian Geography and Economics =

- Discipline: Economic geography, political geography, demographics
- Language: English
- Edited by: Craig Young

Publication details
- Former names: Soviet Geography, Post-Soviet Geography, Post-Soviet Geography and Economics
- History: 1960-present
- Publisher: Taylor & Francis
- Frequency: Bimonthly
- Impact factor: 2.088 (2018)

Standard abbreviations
- ISO 4: Eurasian Geogr. Econ.

Indexing
- ISSN: 1538-7216 (print); 1938-2863 (web)

Links
- Journal homepage

Eurasian Geography and Economics is a bimonthly peer-reviewed academic journal covering economic and political geography as well as macroeconomics of the Eurasian continent. It primarily covers geography also publishes interdisciplinary works. In addition to research, it also covers literature review, as well as shorter articles on its Eurasian Pulse portion of the journal. It is published by Taylor & Francis and was established in 1960 as Soviet Geography. It went through a series of name changes: Post-Soviet Geography (1992–1995) and Post-Soviet Geography and Economics (1996–2002) before obtaining its current title in 2002. The journal is edited by Craig Young.
