= Geopolitics (journal) =

- Discipline: Global politics, political economy, human geography
- Language: English
- Edited by: Reece Jones

Publication details
- History: 1996-present
- Publisher: Routledge
- Frequency: 5/year
- Impact factor: 4.117 (2020)

Standard abbreviations
- ISO 4: Geopolitics

Indexing
- ISSN: 1465-0045 (print); 1557-3028 (web)
- LCCN: 2005214417
- OCLC no.: 898189200

Links
- Journal homepage; Online access; Online archive

Geopolitics is a peer-reviewed academic journal covering global politics, human geography, and international political economy. It was established in 1996 and is published by Routledge.

== Editors-in-chief ==
The current editor-in-chief is Reece Jones (University of Hawaiʻi at Mānoa).

Previous editors-in-chief are:

- Richard Schofield (1995-1999)
- John Agnew (1999-2008)
- David Newman (1998-2014)
- Simon Dalby (2009-2014)
- Colin Flint (2014-2019)
- Virginie Mamadouh (2014-2019)

== Abstracting and indexing ==
The journal is abstracted and indexed in:

- Applied Social Science Index and Abstracts
- EBSCOhost
- GEOBASE
- Geographical Abstracts
- International Bibliography of the Social Sciences
- International Political Science Abstracts
- PAIS International
- Scopus
- Social Sciences Citation Index

According to the Journal Citation Reports, the journal has a 2020 impact factor of 4.117.

== See also ==
- List of political science journals
