= Padaei =

Indian tribe described by Herodotus

The Padaei (Greek: Παδαῖοι) or the Padaeans are an Indian tribe described by the Greek historian Herodotus in The Histories. Herodotus describes them (III.101) as being darker than other Indians and living in a place which is very distant from Persia towards the south and east. An extract from his work (III.99) includes the following:

"Another tribe of Indians, called the Padaei, who live to the east of these marsh Indians, are nomadic and eat raw meat. They are said to have the following customs. If any of their compatriots -- a man or a woman -- is ill, his closest male friends (assuming that it is a man who is ill) kill him, on the grounds that if he wasted away in illness his flesh would become spoiled. He denies that he is ill, but they take no notice, kill him, and have a feast. Exactly the same procedure is followed by a woman's closest female friends when it is a woman who is ill. They sacrifice and eat anyone who reaches old age, but it is unusual for anyone to do so, because they kill everyone who falls ill before reaching old age."

Scholars in the nineteenth and early twentieth centuries suggested a number of possible identifications of the Padaei. Newbold thought that they were likely to be the Batta, a tribe of Sumatra, who he said continued to practice cannibalism. Others have recorded that the Batta of the central Sumatran highlands not only were cannibals, but they also formerly ate their elders. Wheeler cited scholars who connected the name "Padaei" variously with Paddar (a town in Ladakh), a river in Kutch and the Ganges. He suggested that the name might be a general name or term for the nomadic inhabitants of north-western India. William Smith, citing Mannert, suggested that they might be Tatars, and not an Indian tribe. Latham pointed to the similarity of the name "Padaei" with that of the Batta and the Veddas, and concluded that all that could be said as to the Padaei's identity was that they were a "rude tribe in contact with an Indian population." Rawlinson suggested that they may be the "Bhils, Gonds, or other aboriginal races of central India."

The reliability of Herodotus' description of the Padaei's cannibalistic practices has also been questioned by other scholars. Wheeler took the view that whether they were really cannibals "may be doubted." James Rennell said that Herodotus' description of the Padaei was an "odd mixture of truth and falsehood" which was probably a result of what he considered Herodotus' "very confined knowledge of India." Murphy and Mallory suggest that Herodotus' description may result from a misinterpretation of the ritual of dismemberment known to have been practiced by Iron Age cultures who are believed to have spoken Iranian languages.
