= Klaus Dodds =

British academic

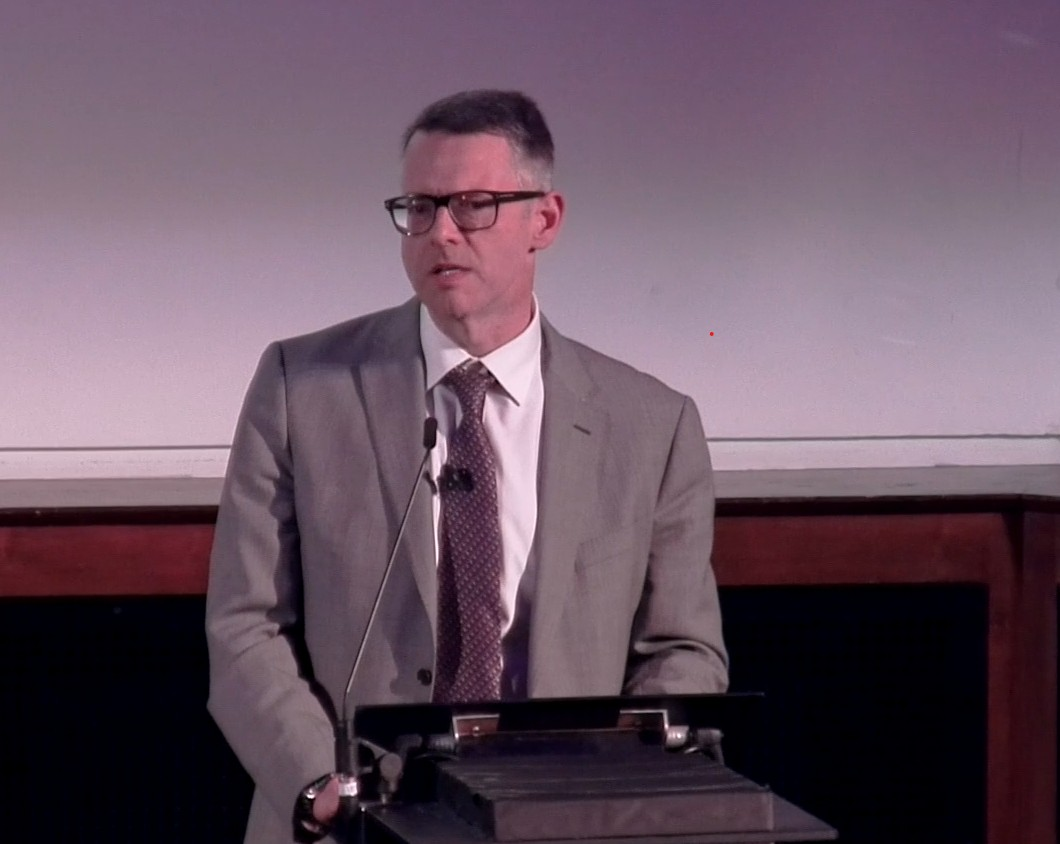
Klaus Dodds, Professor, speaking at a Royal Geographical Society lecture on the Arctic

Klaus Dodds is a university professor and published author on the subjects of geopolitics and geography.

== Education ==
Dodds completed his PhD studies at the Department of Geography (now School of Geographical Sciences) University of Bristol in 1994. His research was funded by the Economic and Social Research Council and fieldwork was carried out in Argentina and the United States. He was a visiting student at Emporia State University in Kansas and the Inter-American Defence College in Washington DC. The PhD examiners were Professor Sir Nigel Thrift FBA and Professor Peter Taylor FBA.

== Career ==
Dodds worked initially at the University of Edinburgh, before becoming a lecturer at Royal Holloway in 1994. From 1994 to 2025, he worked at the Department of Geography at Royal Holloway and served in the past as dean of the graduate school for the university and vice dean of research for the School of Life Sciences and Environment. He has supervised PhD students in a range of subjects from critical and popular geopolitics and polar studies to cybersecurity and digital statecraft. He has held visiting fellowships at University of Canterbury in New Zealand, Loughborough University and St Cross College and St Johns College University of Oxford.

Between 2022 and 2025, he was executive dean of the School of Life Sciences and Environment and professor of geopolitics at Royal Holloway, University of London as well as Professor of Geopolitics. He was also a visiting professor at the College of Europe in Natolin Warsaw Poland.

In January 2026, Dodds was appointed Dean for the faculty of science and technology at Middlesex University London.

== Recognition ==
In 2005, Dodds was awarded the annual Philip Leverhulme Prize by the Leverhulme Trust for "an outstanding contribution to political geography and ‘critical geopolitics'" In 2008, he was awarded the Richard Morrill Public Outreach Award by the Political Geography Speciality Group of the AAG. In 2012 he was elected to the UK's Academy of Social Sciences as Fellow.

In 2017, he was awarded a Major Research Fellowship by the Leverhulme Trust for his work on polar geopolitics. Beyond academia he has worked as a specialist adviser to the House of Lords select committee on the Arctic and the House of Commons Environment Audit Committee. He is a former Trustee of the Royal Geographical Society (2019–2022) and continues as an Honorary Fellow of British Antarctic Survey.

He is a Fellow of the Royal Geographical Society and a Fellow of the Regional Studies Association.

In 2026, he became a Royal Navy Visiting Fellow and in March 2026, Dodds was awarded an Honorary Doctorate by the University of Tromsø – The Arctic University of Norway for research on Antarctica, the Arctic and border studies.

== Publications ==
His books include:

- Unfrozen: The Fight for the Future of the Arctic (2025)
- Border Wars (Ebury Press, 2021, Penguin 2022)
- The Arctic: A Very Short Introduction (2021)
- Geographies, Genders and Geopolitics of James Bond (Palgrave 2017, with Lisa Funnell)
- The Antarctic: A Very Short Introduction (OUP, 2012)
- Geopolitics: A Very Short Introduction (OUP 2007, 2014, 2019)
- Pink Ice: Britain and the South Atlantic Empire (I B Tauris 2002).

Dodds is a former co-editor of the Routledge Geopolitics Book Series with Reece Jones. He is also a former editor of The Geographical Journal (2010–2015) and a former Editor in Chief of Territory Politics Governance (2018–2024).

He has also written for The Spectator.
