= Derek Gregory =

British academic and geographer

Professor Derek Gregory FBA FRSC

Professor of Geography, University of British Columbia

Personal details
- Born: 1 March 1951 (age 75)
- Occupation: Geographer

Derek Gregory (born 1 March 1951) is a British academic and world-renowned geographer who is currently Peter Wall Distinguished Professor and professor of geography at the University of British Columbia in Vancouver. He formerly held positions at the University of Cambridge.

Gregory is best known for his book The Colonial Present: Afghanistan, Palestine and Iraq, published in 2004. This book discusses the actions of various western governments in the Middle East after the 9/11 attacks. It reflects how the popular discourses found in the media and in political circles indicate a continued presence of orientalist and neocolonialist undercurrents. The work also draws on the work of political theorist Giorgio Agamben and in particular his theory of the 'state of exception'.

Earlier works by Gregory have concentrated on political, cultural and historical geography. He has also contributed to theoretical writing on imagined geographies and David Harvey. A book published in 1994, Geographical Imaginations, explores the relations between social theory and place, space and landscape.

He graduated from the University of Cambridge with a Master of Arts and a Doctor of Philosophy in 1981. He has honorary doctorates from the University of Heidelberg and Roskilde University, and he was awarded the Founder's Medal of the Royal Geographical Society in 2006. His current research is on late modern war and on the cultural/political histories and geographies of bombing.

He blogs at www.geographicalimaginations.com

== Bibliography ==
- War and Peace, Transactions of the Institute of British Geographers, Volume 35, Issue 2, pages 154–186, (April 2010)
- Violent Geographies: Fear, Terror, and Political Violence. Routledge(November 22, 2006) ISBN 0-415-95146-1
- The Colonial Present: Afghanistan, Palestine, Iraq. Wiley-Blackwell (4 Jun 2004) ISBN 1577180909
- Geographical Imaginations. Blackwell (1994) ISBN 0631183310
