= Raymond L. Bryant =

British-Canadian geographer

Raymond L. Bryant (Born Canada, 18 July 1961) is a British-Canadian geographer and Professor Emeritus of Political Ecology at King's College London. He is known for his founding contributions to the interdisciplinary field of political ecology.

== Education and career ==
Bryant studied politics and received a BA (Hons) from the University of Victoria, Canada, in 1983 and an MA from Carleton University, Canada, in 1989. He received a PhD from the School of Oriental and African Studies, University of London in 1993 for research on forestry in Burma.

Bryant was a member of the Department of Geography at King's College London from 1993 until retiring and leaving academia in September 2020. He has also taught at Cambridge University, Yale University and University College London and was, among other places, invited to speak at the universities in Oxford, Chicago and Copenhagen.

He served on the editorial boards of Political Geography, the Journal of Political Ecology, and the Singapore Journal of Tropical Geography.

== Scholarship ==
=== Political ecology ===
Bryant played a key role in the development of political ecology as an interdisciplinary field, with implications in geography, anthropology, political science and development studies. With Sinéad Bailey, he published the landmark Third World Political Ecology (Routledge, 1997) arguing that the costs and benefits of environmental change always are distributed unequally. Environmental change also reinforces or alters social and economic inequalities as well as power relations. Bryant and Bailey developed an actor-centred perspective to show how environmental change is shaped by actors on different scales with unequal power resources.

Bryant continued to synthesize research in the field, most recently in the substantial International Handbook of Political Ecology (Edward Elgar, 2015).

=== Forestry ===
A key theme in Bryant's research was the politics of forestry, particularly in Burma. He studied how the Burmese state historically has sought to control forests and forest-related activities, but also how other environmental actors including peasants, loggers, and transnational corporations have contested state control.

As part of a wider effort to study ethical consumption, he contributed to our understanding of the knowledge regimes and violence associated with teak branding for Western markets.

=== NGOs and moral capital ===
Another theme in Bryant's research was the role of NGOs in environmental struggles and the way such organizations strategize and empower themselves by generating 'moral capital'. Through in-depth studies of NGOs in the Philippines, he argues that the 'quest for moral capital' is compromised by NGOs' need to work with political and economic elites.

== Personal life ==
Bryant lives with his wife and two children in London.

== Books ==
- Bryant, R. L. (ed.) 2015.. Cheltenham: Edward Elgar.
- Paniagua, A., R. L. Bryant, and T. Kizos. (eds.) 2012. The Political Ecology of Depopulation: Inequality, Landscape and People. Zaragoza: CEDDAR.
- Bryant, R. L. 2005. Nongovernmental Organizations in Environmental Struggles: Politics and the Making of Moral Capital in the Philippines. New Haven: Yale University Press.
- Bryant, R. L., and S. Bailey. 1997. Third World Political Ecology. London: Routledge.
- Bryant, R. L. 1997. The Political Ecology of Forestry in Burma, 1824–1994. Honolulu: University of Hawaii Press; London: C. Hurst & Co.
- Wilson G, and R. L. Bryant. 1997. Environmental Management: New Directions for the Twenty-First Century. New York: Taylor & Francis.
- Parnwell, M. and R. L. Bryant. (eds.) 1996. Environmental Change in South-East Asia: People, Politics and Sustainable Development. London: Routledge.

== Other notable publications ==
- Bryant, R. L. 2013. Branding Natural Resources: Science, Violence and Marketing in the Making of Teak. Transactions of the Institute of British Geographers 38: 517–530.
- Kim, S., G. U. Ojo, R. Z. Zaidi, and R. L. Bryant. 2012. Other Political Ecologies. Special theme section, Singapore Journal of Tropical Geography 33: 29–123.
- Bryant, R. L., and M. Goodman. 2004. Consuming Narratives: The Political Ecology of “Alternative” Consumption. Transactions of the Institute of British Geographers 29: 344–366.
- Bryant, R. L., and L. Jarosz. 2004. Ethics in Political Ecology. Special issue, Political Geography 23: 807–927.
- Bryant, R. L. 2002. NGOs and Governmentality: “Consuming” Biodiversity and Indigenous People in the Philippines. Political Studies 50: 268–292.
- Bryant, R. L. 1998. Power, Knowledge and Political Ecology in the Third World. Progress in Physical Geography 22: 79–94.
- Bryant, R. L., and G. Wilson. 1998. Rethinking Environmental Management. Progress in Human Geography 22: 321–343.
- Bryant, R. L. 1997. Beyond the Impasse: The Power of Political Ecology in Third World Environmental Research. Area 29: 1–15.
- Bryant, R. L., J. Rigg, and P. Stott. 1993. Political Ecology of Southeast Asian Forests: Trans-Disciplinary Discourses. Special issue, Global Ecology and Biogeography Letters 3: 101–296.
- Bryant, R. L. 1992. Political Ecology: An Emerging Research Agenda in Third-World Studies. Political Geography 11: 12–36.
