= Simon Batterbury =

British-Australian geographer

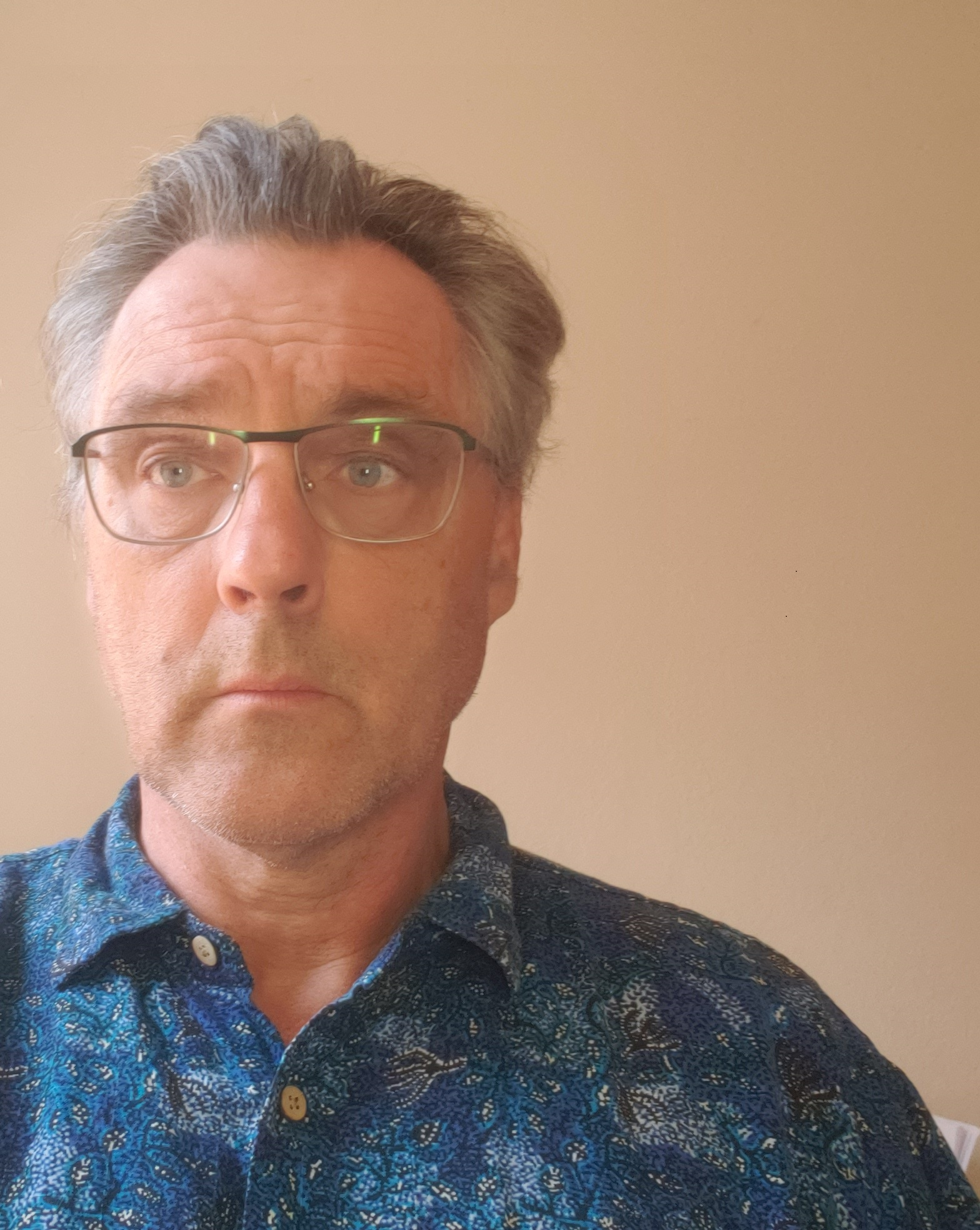
- Born: 1963 (age 62–63); Greenwich, south-east London, England
- Education: Eltham College; Reading University (BSc, Human and Physical Geography, 1985); Clark University (MA, 1990; PhD, 1997)
- Occupations: Geographer, Academic
- Years active: 1993–present
- Employer(s): University of Melbourne, Australia; Lancaster University, UK
- Known for: Research in political ecology, environmental studies, Indigenous peoples and mining, dryland livelihoods in Africa
- Title: Professor of Environmental Studies at the University of Melbourne; formerly Visiting Professor at Lancaster University
- Awards: British Academy Fellowship, 2024; James Martin Fellow, University of Oxford, 2007
- Website: http://simonbatterbury.net

Simon Batterbury (born 1963) is a British-Australian geographer, Professor of Environmental Studies at the University of Melbourne, Australia.

== Background ==
Born in Greenwich and raised in Eltham, South East London, he attended Eltham College and Reading University (Human & Physical Geography, 1985, taught by Sir Peter Hall and Mike Breheny). He worked at Property Market Analysis in the 1980s doing applied property research, moving to Clark University in Massachusetts for an MA (1990) and PhD (1997) in geography, supervised by Doug Johnson and Billie Lee Turner II). He then held academic appointments at Brunel University (1993–1999, beginning at West London Institute), the London School of Economics (1999–2001), the University of Arizona (2001–2004) and the University of Melbourne (2004–2016, 2019–date). From 2017 to 2019 he was the inaugural Professor and Chair of Political Ecology in the Lancaster Environment Centre, Lancaster University.

At the University of Melbourne, he directed the Office for Environmental Programs and the interdisciplinary Master of Environment degree with 370 students, and from 2023, the Melbourne Climate Futures Academy for PhD students and early career researchers.

== Contributions ==
Batterbury was an early adopter of cross-scale political ecology when working with a development program in Burkina Faso offering soil conservation through diguettes, showing how local environmental changes/erosion resulted from adverse national and international political economic forces, networks of power, and inequality.

A large interdisciplinary investigation of land use change and livelihoods in South West Niger with Andrew Warren followed, funded by the UK-based ESRC. The work showed the adaptability of peasant farmers to drought, poverty, and inequality in access to resources through 'productive bricolage' and diversification of livelihoods. Empirical studies of desertification in the Sahel found strong local adaptability to uncertain rainfall, with little use of Western agricultural inputs or seed varieties.

A comparative study of World Bank relationships with NGOs in Bangladesh, Burkina Faso and Ecuador with David Lewis and Tony Bebbington resulted in several articles.

Since 2010 he has worked in the un-decolonised South Pacific settler economy of New Caledonia-Kanaky on the political ecology of mining and other issues affecting Indigenous Kanak societies and cultures, producing a major volume in English in 2024 with Matthias Kowasch. Indigenous people have reluctantly embraced mining, but use it to their geopolitical advantage including control of a major nickel project, the Koniambo mine. The Critical Raw Materials Act in Europe has a peripheral influence on mining on the islands and poses new challenges for raw material supply for the European Green Deal.

Research on Community Bike Workshops and their contributions of low carbon mobility, social justice, and active travel is an emerging area (funded by the British Academy, 2024). Batterbury chairs a small workshop, WeCycle, that gives away more than 250 rebuilt and repaired bikes a year to refugees and asylum seekers in Melbourne; it featured on national TV.

== Open Access ==
Batterbury has co-edited the Journal of Political Ecology since 2003. Editing this zero-budget OA journal led to strong support for Diamond Open Access non-commercial scholarly publishing including an Open Access Manifesto and media work.

== Awards ==
- TEMA fellowship, Linköping University, Sweden, 2026
- British Academy fellowship, 2024
- Best PhD/Graduate supervisor, University of Melbourne, 2019
- COSMOPOLIS fellow, Vrije Universiteit Brussel, 2015
- James Martin Fellow, ECI, University of Oxford, 2007

== Selected publications ==
- Kowasch M. and Batterbury, S.P.J. (eds.). 2024. Geographies of New Caledonia-Kanaky: environments, politics and cultures. Springer. (19 chapters) https://doi.org/10.1007/978-3-031-49140-5
- Batterbury S.P.J. and I. Vandermeersch. 2016. Bicycle justice: community bicycle workshops and "invisible cyclists" in Brussels. In A. Golub, M.L. Hoffmann, A.E.Lugo & G.F. Sandoval (eds.). Bicycle justice and urban transformation: biking for all? Routledge. 189-202.
- Reynolds J.F., D.M. Stafford-Smith, E. Lambin, B.L. Turner II, M.J Mortimore, S.P.J Batterbury, T.E. Downing, H. Dowlatabadi, R.J. Fernandez, J.E. Herrick, E. Huber-Sannwald, H. Jiang, R. Leemans, T. Lynam, F. Maestre, B. Walker, and M. Ayarza. 2007. Global desertification: building a science for dryland development. Science. 316 (May 11): 847-851. https://doi.org/10.1126/science.1131634
- Batterbury, S.P.J. (ed.) 2006. Rescaling governance and the impacts of political and environmental decentralization. World Development 34(11): 1851-1995. (8 articles)
- Batterbury, S.P.J & A. Warren (eds.) 2001. The African Sahel 25 years after the Great Drought. Global Environmental Change 11(1): 1-96. (8 articles).
