= David Lewis (anthropologist) =

British scholar (born 1960)

David Lewis (born February 6, 1960, in Totnes, Devon) is a British scholar who is Professor of Anthropology and Development at the London School of Economics and Political Science (LSE).

== Background ==
David Lewis grew up in Bearsden, near Glasgow, Scotland, and in the city of Bath in the west of England. He read Social Anthropology at the University of Cambridge (1982). He has a PhD in Development Studies from the University of Bath (1989).

Before becoming a lecturer at the London School of Economics & Political Science (LSE) in 1995, he was briefly a freelance development researcher and consultant. At LSE he worked at the Centre for Voluntary Organisation (CVO, later Centre for Civil Society) until 2006 when he moved into the Department of Social Policy. In 2021 he joined the LSE’s Department of International Development, where he co-directed the MSc Development Studies programme between 2021 and 2024.

He has authored several books and academic articles and has presented his work at many universities around the world including Harvard, Yale, Oxford, Dhaka, and the Chinese Academy of Social Sciences.

His field work has been primarily in South and South East Asia - mainly Bangladesh but also including India, Nepal, Sri Lanka and Philippines. However, he has also done short term research in Russia, Albania, Nigeria, Uganda and the UK.

He has another small-scale career as a singer songwriter and folk/rock musician, recording extensively with college friend John Wesley Harding, touring in Europe and the USA, and releasing five albums of original songs. In February 2026 he released a new album, In the Moment .

== Academic contributions ==
David Lewis's main research focus is on the analysis of international development policy and the work of development organizations, and on South Asia. He has a particular interest in non-governmental organisations (NGOs) and civil society. He has also carried out research and written on agrarian change, development management, and the relationship between anthropology and development.

The main field location for his research has been Bangladesh. He first went to the country to undertake a fifteen-month period of village level fieldwork for a PhD on agricultural technology and agrarian change. This was later published in book form as Technologies and Transactions, by Dhaka University in 1991. In the early 1990s, he also worked on aquaculture and livelihoods in Bangladesh, and published Trading the Silver Seed (UPL, 1996), co-authored with Geof Wood and Rick Gregory. In 2011 he published Bangladesh: Politics, Economy and Civil Society (Cambridge University Press).

David Lewis’ other books have included Anthropology, Development and the Postmodern Challenge (Pluto, 1996, with K. Gardner), The Management of Non-Governmental Organizations (Routledge, 2001), Development Brokers and Translators (Kumarian 2006, edited with David Mosse), and Non-Governmental Organizations and Development (Routledge 2009, with Nazneen Kanji).

=== Understanding non-governmental organizations (NGOs) ===
Based on his teaching at LSE, where he helped to establish one of the world's first postgraduate programmes on NGOs, Lewis has written extensively on NGOs and international development. With Nazneen Kanji he wrote Non-Governmental Organisations and Development, a critical overview text that drew together the emerging academic literature on NGOs, tracing the increasing importance of NGOs as development actors and showing how they have influenced both development theory and practice since the 1980s (2009, second edition 2021).

In 2014 he published 'NGOs, Management and Development' (Routledge 2014). This book comprehensively updated earlier editions from 2001 and 2007 to critically explore the changing field of NGOs and development, uncovering historical perspectives and analyzing contemporary settings and issues. Taking an anthropological approach to the study of organization, Lewis argues that NGO management is a highly complex field, with organizations increasingly depending on improvisation, synthesis and hybrid approaches in difficult organizational environments. Drawing upon current research across fields such as non-profit studies, development management and organization and management theory, he analyses the important new field of NGO management. By giving equal attention to the activities, relationships and internal structure of the NGO, the author develops a composite model of NGO management that sets out the distinctive challenges faced.

=== Politics and development in Bangladesh ===
After many years of visiting Bangladesh, and finding few English language resources about the country, Lewis decided to write 'Bangladesh: Politics, Economy and Civil Society' (Cambridge University Press, 2011). It was one of the first overviews of contemporary Bangladesh to be published internationally for many years.

The book was intended to be accessible to general readers and documents Bangladesh’s struggle for independence from Pakistan along with its emergence as a fragile, but functioning, parliamentary democracy. It examines the economic, political and social changes that have taken place in the country over the last twenty years. It argues that Bangladesh is now becoming of increasing interest to the international community as a portal into some of the key issues of our age – such as development and poverty reduction, climate change adaptation, and the role of civil society and state in promoting democracy and stability, particularly in the context of Muslim majority countries.

Despite its difficult past and many continuing challenges, the country is changing fast. In this way, the book offers an important corrective to the view of Bangladesh as a 'failed state'.

He has also undertaken two studies of local power and participation in Bangladesh, with Bangladeshi sociologist Abul Hossain.

=== Anthropology and development ===
David Lewis has had a long interest in anthropological approaches to understanding and doing development. Co-written with Katy Gardner, the book 'Anthropology and Development: Challenges for the 21st Century' (Pluto 2015) was a completely rewritten new edition of the best-selling and critically acclaimed 'Anthropology, Development and the Post-Modern Challenge' (1996).

The book aims to serve as both an innovative reformulation of the field, and as a key text for students and researchers at leading universities in Europe and North America. The authors updated the book by engaging with nearly two decades of continuity and change in the development industry. In particular, they argue that while the world of international development has expanded since the 1990s, it has become more rigidly technocratic. Furthermore, Western aid is in decline and new set of global economic and political processes are shaping the twenty-first century.

'Anthropology and Development' therefore insists on a focus upon the core anthropological issues surrounding poverty and inequality, and argue for a shift away from recent anthropological preoccupations with 'aidnography', and thus provide a timely redefinition what are perceived as the main issues and problems in the field.

He has also edited two influential books on anthropology and development with David Mosse, The Aid Effect (2005) and Development Brokers and Translators (2006).

=== Life histories of civil society activists and leaders ===
Between 2006 and 2010, he was lead researcher on the ESRC-funded study on Activists, Power and Sectoral Boundaries: Life Histories of NGO Leaders. This research project used the life history method to study the experiences of individuals who moved between state and civil society in different countries, including Bangladesh, Philippines and UK.

The research drew attention to the importance of the blurred boundaries between government and non-state actors and the crossings and exchanges that take place between these sectors.

It also analysed the motivations of people who choose to work in more than one sector, and the exchanges of knowledge that take place when this happens.

=== Development projects, civil society organizations and organisational culture ===
In 1999-2000, he conducted a research project (jointly with Anthony Bebbington and Simon Batterbury on culture, projects and partnership for the World Bank's poverty programmes under the title Organizational cultures and spaces for empowerment? Interactions between poor people’s organizations and poverty programmes. The countries covered in the study were Bangladesh, Burkina Faso and Ecuador. A number of articles were published from the project including this overview paper.

The findings suggested that development agencies need to pay more attention to issues of power in the relationships they seek to building suggested practical ways forward in building this awareness.

=== The fiction, film and music of development ===
In recent years he has become interested in broadening the field of academic development studies by making closer links with humanities and the arts, working with Professors Dennis Rodgers (Geneva) and Michael Woolcock (World Bank/Harvard) on this theme.

He is co-editor with Dennis Rodgers and Michael Woolcock of Popular Representations of Development. This book had its origins in a 2008 paper by the same authors that aroused some media interest.

A public event was held on this theme at the LSE's first Literary Festival in February 2010 organized by the International Development Department's (then DESTIN) Crisis States Research Centre, and the Department of Social Policy on 'The Fiction of Development' idea – and at which three noted literary figures Giles Foden (author, The Last King of Scotland), Jack Mapanje (Malawian poet and Senior Lecturer in Creative Writing at Newcastle University), and Sunny Singh (Indian writer and journalist) as well as Professor Lewis all discussed the topic.

In 2020, a new article on development and music was published. 'The sounds of development', co-written with Rodgers and Woolcock, is the third overview paper in a continuing series exploring development studies and the arts and humanities that started with the 2008 paper on novels.

A recent blog on the film Contagion (analysed in the context of the Covid-19 pandemic) explored how the world the film portrayed when it was released in 2011 differs in important respects from today's more fragmented international context in which multilateral cooperation is on the decline.

The co-edited book New Mediums, Better Messages? How Innovations in Translation, Engagement, and Advocacy are Changing International Development, also co-edited with Rodgers and Woolcock, was published in June 2022.

=== The 'reality check' approach to improving accountability ===
Lewis was one of a group of people working in Bangladesh during the mid-2000s who developed a new approach to linking policy and people that became known as the reality check approach. Drawing on ideas from participatory learning and action (PLA) and from ethnographic research methods, the basic idea was to learn about the downstream effects of policy changes by living with and learning from households.

Between 2006 and 2013 Lewis worked as an adviser to the Bangladesh Reality Check Project – a Sida sponsored initiative that documented grassroots experiences and perceptions of health and education reform in Bangladesh.

The reality check methodology has subsequently been adapted, developed further and used in a number of other initiatives by development agencies around the world, including Nepal, Mozambique and Indonesia. An academic article on the Bangladesh experience was published by Lewis in the journal World Development in an academic article entitled 'Peopling Policy Processes' in 2017.

=== Practical engagement and consultancy work ===
He has also worked as a consultant for several development agencies, including the (former) DFID, Oxfam, Save the Children Fund, Sida and BRAC (NGO).

== Selected publications ==
- Lewis, D. & Gardner, K. (2015). Anthropology and Development: Challenges for the 21st Century. Pluto.
- Lewis, D. (2014). Non-Governmental Organizations, Management and Development. Routledge.
- Lewis, D., D. Rodgers & M. Woolcock (eds.) (2013). Popular Representations of Development: Insights from Novels, Films, Television and Social Media. Routledge.
- Lewis, D. (2011).Bangladesh: Politics, Economy and Civil Society. Cambridge University Press.
- Lewis, D. & Kanji, N. (2009). Non-Governmental Organisations and Development London: Routledge ISBN 0-415-45430-1
- Lewis, D. & A. Hossain. (2008). Understanding the Local Power Structure in Bangladesh. Swedish International Development Cooperation Agency (Sida), Stockholm: Sida Studies No. 22.
- Lewis, D. & D. Mosse (eds.) (2006). Development Brokers and Translators: The Ethnography of Aid and Agencies. Bloomfield, CT: Kumarian Books.
- Lewis D. (2001). The Management of Non-Governmental Development Organisations London: Routledge ISBN 0-415-20759-2. 2nd Edition (2007).
- Lewis D. & D. Mosse. (eds.) (2005). The Aid Effect: Giving and Governing in International Development. London: Pluto Press.
- Glasius M., D. Lewis & H. Seckinelgin. (eds.) (2004). Exploring Civil Society: Political and Cultural Contexts. London: Routledge.
- Lewis D. & T. Wallace. (eds.) (2000). New Roles and Relevance: Development NGOs and the Challenge of Change. Hartford, Ct: Kumarian Press.
- Lewis, D. (ed.) (1999). International Perspectives on Voluntary Action: Rethinking the Third Sector. London: Earthscan.
- Lewis, D. & K. Gardner. (1996). Anthropology, Development and the Post-Modern Challenge. London: Pluto Press.
- Lewis D., G.D. Wood & R. Gregory. (1996). Trading the Silver Seed: Local Knowledge and Market Moralities in Aquacultural Development. London: Intermediate Technology Publications.
- Lewis, D. & Farringdon J. (eds.) (1993). NGOs and the State in Asia: Rethinking Roles in Sustainable Agricultural development. London: Routledge.
- Lewis, D. (1991). Technologies and Transactions: A Study of the Interaction between New Technology and Agrarian Structure in Bangladesh. University of Dhaka, Bangladesh: Centre for Social Studies.

== Music and recording ==
As a singer-songwriter, David Lewis has released five albums of original music since 1995.

=== No Straight Line (1995) ===
David Lewis's well-received first CD 'No Straight Line' was issued in 1995 on the now defunct Austin-based Dejadisc label and launched at the South By South West festival that year. Containing songs written and performed with a 1970s UK contemporary folk feel (Nick Drake, Al Stewart, Sandy Denny) the album was produced by Wesley Stace (a.k.a. John Wesley Harding) and Scott Mathews and featured R.E.M.'s Peter Buck on mandolin on "Slowly Fading Evening Sky". The songs on the album explored a wide range of folk styles and acoustic instruments, supported by expert percussion work from Mathews. Some songs, like "Calm Before the Storm", "Ramadan Moon", and "Due South" were influenced by his time spent doing fieldwork in Bangladesh.

=== For Now (2001) ===
David Lewis's second CD For Now was released by Appleseed Recordings in October 2001. The album, again produced by John Wesley Harding (this time with Chris von Sneidern), was recorded in San Francisco and contained eleven new songs (including one cover version, Nick Drake's 'Northern Sky'). Moving closer to folk-rock than the first collection, several tracks featured a full band with Chuck Prophet on electric guitar and Al Stewart himself sings harmonies on 'You Don't Know'. Songs such as 'Ramadan Moon' and 'Weary Traveller' continued to explore life as an itinerant researcher visiting countries in the Global South.

The release of For Now was promoted by a tour of the US (September to December 2001) supporting John Wesley Harding, with Robert Lloyd accompanying on accordion and mandolin.

=== Ghost Rhymes (2007) ===
A third album, Ghost Rhymes, was released on CD in 2007, on Harding's Way Out Wes DIY label. This continued the mix of solo and band songs, and was partly recorded in Seattle with Kurt Bloch, who co-produced the album with Harding and von Sneidern. This album featured an arrangement of the semi-traditional Welsh song 'The Black Pig', which is believed to have originally been written by David's great grandfather, John Owen.

Since then, gigs have been mainly in the London area. During this time, David teamed up regularly with singer-songwriter Bob Collum for shows at venues that included the Green Note Cafe, the 12 Bar Club and The Plough, Walthamstow. They also co-write some songs together. Sometimes combining music with work, Lewis also played occasional gigs further afield. In June 2006, David played a show at The Penguin Cafe, Manila, The Philippines, with Roger Pullin and Sammy Asuncion. He also formed a trio accompanied by David Satterthwaite (guitar, mandolin) and Emma Wilson (violin).

=== Old World New World (2014) ===
By this time, a pattern was emerging with a five or six-year gap between albums, during which time Lewis was fitting music around his day job – writing songs, figuring out opportunities for linking up with international friends to record in between academic work commitments and continuing to exchange musical ideas with his long term collaborator Wesley Stace. Returning to a more minimalist approach, in 2014 Lewis released Old World New World, an album of mainly acoustic songs that was well reviewed. As with all Lewis's albums, there are some co-writes with Stace, in this case, "Nothing to Something" and "The Great Unwind". At this time Lewis was also exploring co-writing songs with Bob Collum, and 'Question Mark Stars' was recorded for this album from their collaboration.

=== Among Friends (2020) ===
In July 2020 he released his fifth collection, entitled Among Friends, this one for the first time also on vinyl. Produced as usual by long term friend and musical collaborator Wesley Stace, most of the record was recorded in America at Daniel Smith’s (Danielson) studio in Clarksboro, NJ. The record features a cast of stellar musicians, including Chris von Sneidern, Robert Lloyd, Dag Juhlin (Poi Dog Pondering, Sunshine Boys), and Patrick Berkery (The War On Drugs). Whereas the previous album was a percussion and electricity free zone, here drums anchor many of the songs. The full band made it possible to experiment with new sounds and textures – such as the industrial clank of 'Three Sides', the unexpected ‘prog’ turn in 'Whisper To Me' – while staying true to the values of the detailed vocals, atmospheric acoustics and distinctive songwriting of Lewis’ earlier albums.

Addressing the paradox of recording a record of English folk rock in the New Jersey countryside, Lewis says “The last few records were recorded at San Francisco’s Hyde Street Studios (formerly the Wally Heider studio). It’s a great, evocative place – the Grateful Dead and CSNY recorded there – but it’s a building where you can’t tell whether it’s night or day outside. This time we were playing a few feet away from green fields, blue skies and spring sunlight. I’m sure that helped to let some more light into the music.”

- “This is David’s most ambitious album yet, combining his best songs with a beautiful studio and wonderful musicianship: the usual suspects, yes, but some superb players on a wide range of instruments. And, as ever, Among Friends is made only for the pleasure of making the record, among friends, its promise fulfilled even as it is recorded.” – Wesley Stace AKA John Wesley Harding
