= Feminist political ecology =

Feminist perspective on political ecology

Feminist political ecology is a feminist approach within political ecology that draws on various theoretical traditions, including Marxism, post-structuralism, feminist geography, ecofeminism, and cultural ecology. It uses intersectional frameworks within and between these traditions to explore ecological and political issues, including development, landscape, resource use, agrarian reconstruction, and rural-urban transformation.

Scholars in this field argue that gender is an important factor in shaping access to, control over, and knowledge of natural resources, and that mainstream environmental policies often rely on gender-neutral assumptions that can overlook women's knowledge of resource management. According to some scholars, such policies reflect a traditional decision-making framework that draws a binary distinction between "scientific knowledge" and "local experience", leading to some development discourse presenting women as victims of environmental change rather than as political actors. From a postcolonial perspective, policies lacking gender consideration may be seen as a continuation of colonial assumptions that devalue non-Western forms of ecological knowledge.

Feminist political ecology thus combines three areas it considers to be gendered: knowledge, environmental rights, and grassroots activism. Gendered knowledge refers to the maintenance of healthy environments at home, work, and/or in regional ecosystems. Gendered environmental rights concern property, resources, space, and legal access. Gendered grassroots activism emphasizes women's involvement in collective natural resources.

== Research ==
Reconstructions of economies, environments, and cultures at a global and local level have expanded studies of the relationships among environments, gender, and development. Feminist political ecology argues that differences in environmental experience should not be explained as biological, but as shaped by social constructs of gender that vary by culture, class, race, location, and historical period. A commonly cited publication in the development of this field is the 1996 book Feminist Political Ecology by Dianne Rocheleau et al which shows how gender shapes environment and labor patterns, and how environmental problems affect women in specific ways. The political ecology volume Liberation Ecologies, edited by Michael Peet and Michael Watts and also published in 1996, gives less attention to gender.

Feminist political ecology positions itself as central to the understanding of environmental injustice. It challenges the preference for macro-scale solutions in traditional ecological research. Resurrección proposes the concept of climate coloniality, emphasizing that the bodies of women in the Global South bear multiple forms of exploitation from industrial pollution to reproductive health risks. This exploitation is not only material but also cognitive. For example, quantitative models in disaster research often ignore gendered bodily experiences.

In a study on a peasant federation (the Rural Federation of Zambrana-Chacuey) and an international nongovernmental organization (ENDA-Caribe) in the Dominican Republic, Dianne Rocheleau examines social forestry within the region. The study illustrates that although women are involved in the forestry industry, previous research – including summary statistics and "regional maps of forestry-as-usual" – did not represent the "different publics (differentiated by gender, class, locality, and occupation) within the Federation (p. 460)."

The ecological resistance of indigenous women in Latin America contributed to a unique political epistemology. The practice of physically occupying oil fields not only challenges the material consequences of resource exploitation but also deconstructs the linear narrative of developmentalism by juxtaposing gender violence and ecological violence. This practice reveals the colonial roots of the dichotomy between nature and culture, but is often misinterpreted by international environmental organizations as pre-modern nostalgia, exposing the cognitive fracture of cross-scale alliances.

Rocheleau's study draws upon post-structuralism to "expand our respective partial and situated knowledges through a politics of science that goes beyond identity to affinities, then works from affinities to coalitions". In other words, the study does not assume that a person's identity defines them but instead focuses on "affinities," (defined as "based on affiliations, and shared views of interests, subject to change over time"). The purpose of this was to "address women within the context in which they had organized and affiliated themselves". The purpose of the study was to include women in the general study of the area in a way that gave justice to the "ecological and social contexts that sustain their lives", instead of separating them from the context and thereby rendering them invisible.

The symbolic resistance of the ecological movement faces the risk of co-option by mainstream discourse. Although the gesture of tree hugging in the Chipko movement constitutes a symbolic protest against commodification, it is often simplified to a cultural landscape at the policy level, thereby avoiding the underlying land rights struggle. This depoliticization process highlights the fundamental contradiction of liberal environmentalism, which romanticizes Southern practices as primitive wisdom but denies their political-economic significance.

In a 2006 Botswana study on urban poultry agriculture, Alice J. Hovorka examines the implications of fast-paced urbanization on social and ecological relations within a feminist political ecology framework. Men and women are both involved and affected by development issues, and therefore "gender is an integral part of a key element of agrarian change and rural-urban transformation". Before urbanization, socially constructed gender roles played a significant part in gendered experiences of the landscape. Gender determined distinct roles, responsibilities and access to resources. Although Botswana women gained the right to vote in 1966 they remained excluded from political power. Gender issues are rarely raised in this country where "powerful conventions restrict women's domain to the household and women's autonomy under male guardianship". With urbanization, land use became more accessible to Botswana women. However, studies have revealed that "women's access to social status and productive resources remains limited compared to men's". Traditional gender roles affect women's economic situation, their access to resources and land, their education, and their participation in the labor market.

The neoliberal economic system shifts the cost of ecological restoration to women within households through individualization strategies, forming an oppressive cycle of poverty, unpaid care labor, and environmental risks. This structure is particularly evident in the agricultural sector. Women in Africa preserve biodiversity through seed banks, but are regarded as informal practitioners by national policies. In South Asia, tourism shapes women as providers of green services, but deprives them of decision-making authority over resources. This triple oppression reveals the interconnected mechanism between capitalism and patriarchy.

The core of the ecological resistance of the African Seed Bank is the struggle against the cognitive paradigm. The traditional seed exchange system constitutes an implicit critique of agricultural industrialization, but its knowledge system is regarded as a development obstacle by national development frameworks. This exclusion reflects the cognitive hegemony of the modern agricultural paradigm, which relegates local knowledge to the "other" of the modernization process.

Alice Beban applied a gendered lens in her research on land tenure in Cambodia. Her study is related to the Cambodian Constitution and Land Law of 2001 which increased private land ownership under land titles. As a result, land owners without formal titles lack land rights and risk loss of land. Women are more vulnerable to insecurity in this situation. Men are more likely to be landowners, and if women are in abusive relationships they have limited choices because men own the land they rely on. Similarly to the Botswana case, women have less political power in this situation.

In 2009 Feminist Political Ecology took a new analytical turn with the publication of Eco-Sufficiency & Global Justice: Women Write Political Ecology edited by Ariel Salleh. For further analysis, see Bonnie Kime Scott, 'Righting the Neoliberal Ecology Debt' in the 2010 Australian Women's Book Review volume 22.1.

== Interdisciplinary perspective ==
Environmental justice research must incorporate an intersectional analysis of race, class, and gender. Spronk argues that the water crisis in American Black communities is essentially the intersection of institutionalized racism and gender division of labor. Women bear the responsibility for family health care but are excluded from governance decisions. This intersectional oppression is further complicated in immigrant labor groups, forming a multidimensional deprivation structure.

== Practical examples ==
With regard to natural resources such as water access, feminist political ecology examines how water access and gender are related, particularly in developing countries. Gender mainstreaming encourages the convergence of women's issues and gender equality with natural resource protection and development projects. Feminist political ecology seeks to question and inform understanding regarding how gender – and other social labels and classifiers – influence how people relate to and interact with the natural environment, including their access to water.

With regard to agriculture, feminist political ecology examines differences in farm resources between men and women in rural areas, where women have less access to agricultural products and are more reliant on men to farm.

And with regard to disaster risk management, the gender-neutral assumption of traditional vulnerability models conceals the structural shaping of survival opportunities by cultural norms. Watkins (2018) demonstrates that male-centrism in disaster response design directly leads to gender-based mortality differences. The concept of "embodied vulnerability" proposed by Lusambili et al. (2024) emphasizes the need to incorporate the physical mobility restrictions of pregnant women and cultural taboos into the risk assessment framework, rather than relying on technological determinism.

== Policy critique ==
The fragmented design of the UN's Sustainable Development Goals (SDGs) exposes the deep flaws of instrumental rational governance. Scholars have noted that the disconnection between Goal 5 (gender equality) and environmental goals leads to clean energy projects ignoring the energy needs in the field of household reproduction. This paradox stems from liberal pluralism simplifying complex socio-ecological relationships into quantifiable indicators, ultimately reproducing rather than dissolving structural injustice.

The technologically neutral discourse of the EU's Green New Deal conceals institutional exclusion. Karpinska and Śmiech found that the energy poverty of elderly women in Eastern Europe is attributed to individual choices rather than barriers to access to photovoltaic cooperatives. This cognitive distortion stems from neoliberalism reconstructing structural oppression as individual responsibility, thereby avoiding the analysis of power relations in policy design.

== Methodological innovation ==
Visualization technology is not only a research tool but also a political practice of cognitive struggle. Dadey's drone mapping project revealed that the systematic erasure of women's farming areas in the land registration system constitutes a form of epistemic violence. The innovative significance of this approach lies in challenging the cognitive hegemony of state spatial governance, and transforming "informal rights" into political facts that can be claimed.

The oral history method reconstructs the narratives of the marginalized and deconstructs the objectivity claim of mainstream discourse. The intergenerational stories of fisherwomen recorded by Andrews et al. reveal how coastal privatization destroys community livelihood networks, and this narrative constitutes a fundamental challenge to the progressive developmentalist narrative. At the methodological level, the objective facade of quantitative data often conceals the value of women's ecological practices, and narratives can restore the suppressed local ontology. It also reveals how coastal privatization destroys community livelihood networks, and this narrative constitutes a fundamental challenge to developmentalist and progressive narratives.

== Technical politics ==
The application of climate technology often replicates existing gender power structures. George argues that the design of disaster warning apps is based on the assumption of male mobility, ignoring the digital access barriers faced by rural women. This technology-neutral myth is further reflected in pregnancy health apps.

The application of blockchain in fair trade exposes the inherent contradictions of green capitalism. Although technology can trace the ecological contributions of female producers, its data ownership structure perpetuates the cognitive deprivation of the North in relation to the South. This ethical certification system converts local knowledge into commodities through data capture, but fails to establish equitable mechanisms for benefit sharing.

== Theoretical reflection ==
Ecofeminism's critique of essentialist tendencies drives the transformation of theoretical paradigms. It also emphasizes that the idealized narrative of women as nature's guardians can obscure class and racial differences, such as the exploitation of Dalit women's labor by high-caste environmentalists. This requires going beyond identity politics and building liberating alliances across species and genders, anchoring ecological struggles in the reconstruction of power relations rather than essentialist assumptions.

== See also ==
- Anarcha-feminism
- Ecofeminism
- Feminism and international relations theory
- Feminist anthropology
- Feminist criminology
- Feminist economics
- Feminist political theory
- Feminist technoscience
- Gender equality
- Material feminism
- Radical feminism
- Socialist feminism
