= Political ecology =

Study of political, economic and social factors about environmental issues

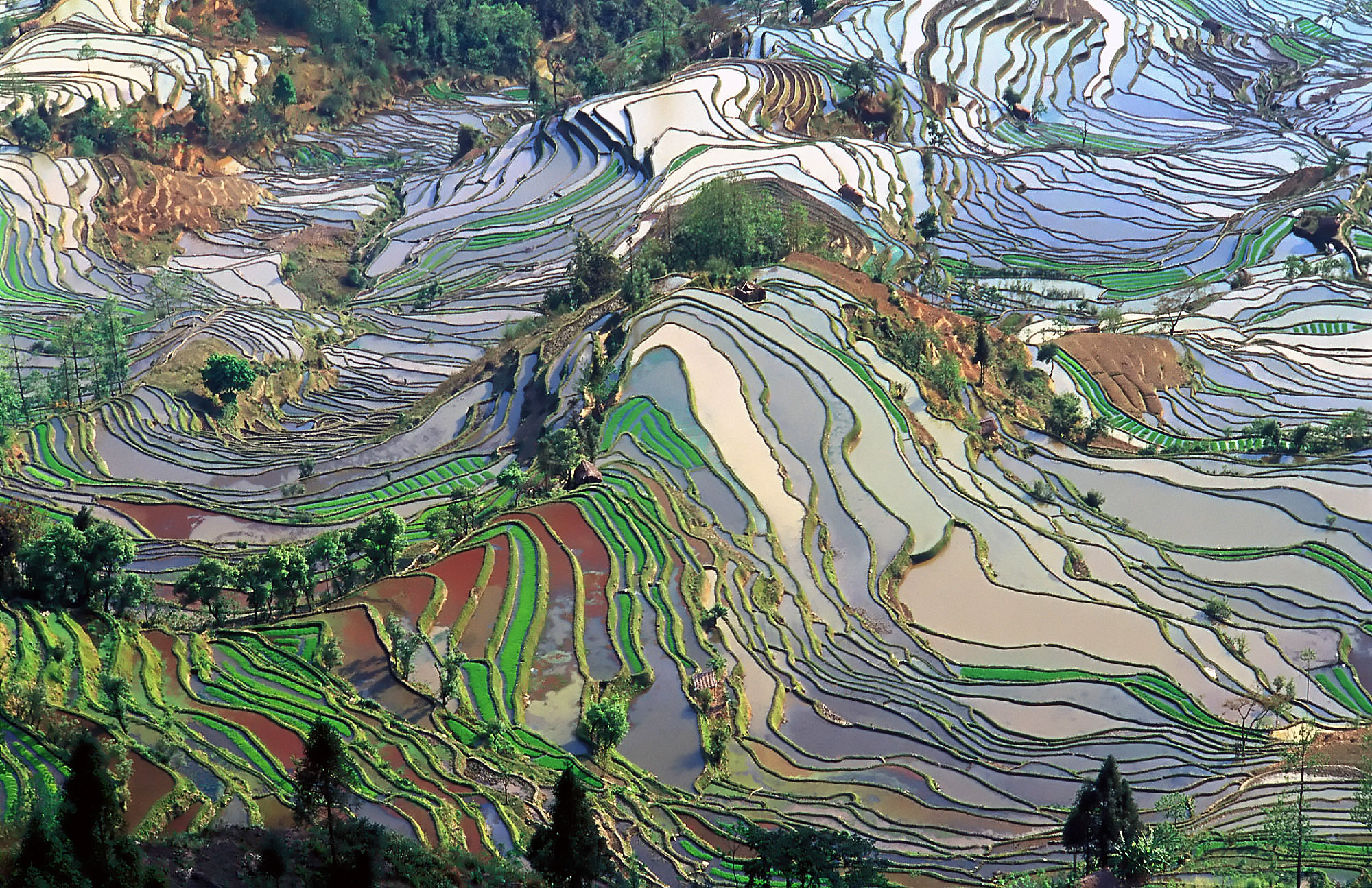
Political ecology studies the complex interaction between economics, politics, technology, social tradition and the biological environment. These terraced rice fields in Yunnan, China, is an example of how the environment is shaped by and shapes economy and society.

Political ecology is the study of how political, economic and social factors relate to environmental issues and climate change. Political ecology differs from conventional ecological studies by foregrounding power relations in environmental issues and phenomena.

As an academic discipline, political ecology integrates ecological social sciences with political economy in topics such as degradation and marginalization, environmental conflict, conservation and control, and environmental identities and social movements. Scholars in political ecology are drawn from a variety of academic disciplines, including geography, anthropology, development studies, political science, economics, sociology, forestry, critical agrarian studies and environmental history.

== Overview ==
While the broad scope and interdisciplinary nature of political ecology lends itself to multiple definitions and understandings, the field shares some common assumptions. Political ecology is frequently seen as an approach to the study of environmental issues, but it can also be understood to define a lived reality and a praxis for change. Raymond L. Bryant and Sinéad Bailey developed three fundamental assumptions in practising political ecology:

- First, changes in the environment do not affect society in a homogenous way: political, social, and economic differences account for uneven distribution of costs and benefits.
- Second, "any change in environmental conditions must affect the political and economic status quo."
- Third, the unequal distribution of costs and benefits and the reinforcing or reducing of pre-existing inequalities has political implications in terms of the altered power relationships that then result.

In addition, political ecology attempts to provide critiques and alternatives in the interplay of the environment and political, economic and social factors. Paul Robbins asserts that the field has a "normative understanding that there are very likely better, less coercive, less exploitative, and more sustainable ways of doing things".

From these assumptions, political ecology can be used to:

- inform policymakers and organizations of the complexities surrounding environment and development, thereby contributing to better environmental governance.
- understand the decisions that communities make about the natural environment in the context of their political environment, economic pressure, and societal regulations.
- look at how unequal relations in and among societies affect the natural environment, especially in the context of government policy.

== Scope and influences ==
Since the 1970s, the field's scope and goals have shifted, as different influences have gained or lost importance. Peter A. Walker traces the importance of the ecological sciences in political ecology. He points to the transition, for many critics, from a ‘structuralist’ approach through the 1970s and 1980s, in which ecology maintains a key position in the discipline, to a 'poststructuralist' approach with an emphasis on the 'politics' in political ecology. This turn has raised questions as to the differentiation with environmental politics as well as the field's use of the term of 'ecology'. Political ecological research has shifted from investigating political influence on the earth's surface to the focus on spatial-ecological influences on politics and power—a scope reminiscent of environmental politics.

Much has been drawn from cultural ecology, a form of analysis that showed how culture depends upon, and is influenced by, the material conditions of society. According to Walker, political ecology has largely eclipsed cultural ecology as a form of analysis. As Walker states, "whereas cultural ecology and systems theory emphasize[s] adaptation and homeostasis, political ecology emphasize[s] the role of political economy as a force of maladaptation and instability".

Political ecologists often use political economy frameworks to analyze environmental issues. Early and prominent examples of this were the study Silent Violence: Food, Famine and Peasantry in Northern Nigeria by Michael Watts in 1983, which traced the famine in northern Nigeria during the 1970s to the effects of colonialism, rather than an inevitable consequence of the drought in the Sahel, and The Political Economy of Soil Erosion in Developing Countries by Piers Blaikie in 1985, which traced land degradation in Africa to colonial policies of land appropriation, rather than over-exploitation by African farmers.

== Relationship to other disciplines ==
=== Anthropology and geography ===
Originating in the 18th and 19th centuries with philosophers such as Adam Smith, Karl Marx, and Thomas Malthus, political economy attempted to explain the relationships between economic production and political processes. It tended toward overly structural explanations, focusing on the role of individual economic relationships in the maintenance of social order. Eric Wolf used political economy in a neo-Marxist framework which began addressing the role of local cultures as a part of the world capitalist system, refusing to see those cultures as "primitive isolates". But environmental effects on political and economic processes were under-emphasised.

Conversely, Julian Steward and Roy Rappaport's theories of cultural ecology are sometimes credited with shifting the functionalist-oriented anthropology of the 1950s and 1960s and incorporating ecology and environment into ethnographic study.

Geographers and anthropologists, working with their respective strengths, formed the basis of political ecology. Political ecology focuses on issues of power, recognizing the importance of explaining environmental impacts on cultural processes without separating out political and economic contexts.

The application of political ecology in the work of anthropologists and geographers differs. While any approach will take both the political/economic and the ecological into account, the emphasis can be unequal. Some, such as geographer Michael Watts, focus on how the assertion of power impacts on access to environmental resources. His approach tends to see environmental harm as both a cause and an effect of “social marginalization”.

=== Conservation ===
There is a divergence of ideas between conservation science and political ecology. With conservationists establishing protected areas to conserve biodiversity, "political ecologists have devoted some energy to the study of protected areas, which is unsurprising given political ecology's overall interest in forms of access to, and control over, resources". Political ecologists argue against the enclosure of land for conservation because it usually denies local people access to the land, harming them and hampering their livelihood systems. As Dove and Carpenter state, "Indigenous people have important environmental knowledge which could contribute to conservation", yet conservation regimes frequently marginalize these knowledge systems by privileging technocratic expertise and external management models. Political ecologists also argue that conservation NGOs and governments extend their regulatory reach, often imposing land use restrictions that undermine Indigenous and other local communities' capacity to sustain themselves and to conserve species and areas, leaving them more vulnerable to dispossession.

Political ecology scholarship from the Global South has sharpened these critiques by foregrounding colonial continuities, resource governance, and the political economy of conservation. The works of Amita Baviskar, Nandini Sundar, and Mahesh Rangarajan demonstrate that conservation-induced displacement, particularly in tiger reserves and forest areas, frequently targets Adivasi and forest-dependent communities. These interventions reinforce long-standing patterns of marginalization under the guise of ecological protection. In Southeast Asia, conservation is deeply entangled with resource extraction, militarization and state-led development agenda. Rather than functioning as neutral ecological interventions, conservation zones in the region frequently overlap with mining concessions, logging interests, plantation expansion, and counter-insurgency operations, revealing conservation as part of a broader system of territorial control.

==== Western vs. indigenous views ====
Western societies' views on ecological conservation often overlook Indigenous knowledge and cast the blame for environmental degradation on Indigenous communities. Political ecology scholars exemplify how Indigenous knowledge challenges dominant conservation narratives. Western knowledge tends to overlook Indigenous land-based practices and to undermine their value in maintaining biodiversity.

The misinterpretation of these practices can lead to misread landscapes, wherein Indigenous land use practices are framed as destructive through a colonial lens. Fairhead and Leach addressed this in their research on West Africa's environmental decline, which they frame as “false forest histories”. Their research actively addressed the false narratives projected at Indigenous land-use practices as destructive to local forests. At the same time, evidence shows that Indigenous communities have been active participants in maintaining and caring for the forest. Controlled burning emerged as a key example of misread ecological practices within Fairhead and Leach's study. Controlled burning was misunderstood as environmentally destructive to local forests and part of irresponsible land use, whereas it had positive ecological effects for the local land. Controlled burning is part of a co-adaptive system in which fire, rain, and soil are seen as interconnected entities that depend on one another to thrive.

Therefore, underscores that colonial interpretations of land management tend to take a top-down approach to forest management rather than a holistic, bottom-up approach in environmental conservation. In addition, research in political ecology has analyzed how Indigenous Knowledge (IK) is contested and or excluded within government-led resource management frameworks. This is due to Western science being prioritized over Indigenous epistemologies, leading to IK to become “othered” within the system to benefit the colonial state. On the West Coast of Canada, Indigenous land-use practices, such as the use of cedar, were exploited by colonial forces through the construction of cedar mills. This was due to the toxic air pollution and dust that the cedar mills would create, and therefore affected the Indigenous and non-Indigenous residents and mill workers. Cedar is sacred to the Nuu-chah-nulth-aht people and used within medicinal and spiritual practices. Therefore, the exploitation of this sacred wood was a clear sign of the misunderstanding and an unbalanced relationship between people and nature. Both these incidents demonstrate that IK systems are vital to understanding our ecological environment, and when IK is misunderstood or overlooked, our environment suffers.

In a few cases, perhaps especially tragic local groups have been displaced to create national parks and reserves to ‘conserve’ the forest. Fortunately, most conservation bodies are now aware that, if a group has been using and managing a forest for several thousand years, throwing it off the land is more apt to destroy the forest ecosystem than to preserve it. (Sutton 2004: 302)

== Power in political ecology ==
Power is a defining and fundamental concern of political ecology. According to Greenberg and Park, political ecology is a way of creating a synergy between a political economy that aligns power distribution with ecological analysis and economic activities in a wider version of bio-environmental relations. Bryant explains political ecology as the dynamic in politics that is associated with "discursive struggle" and material in the environment of less developed nations, showing how unequal relations in power make up a political environment. In the view of Robbins, political ecology is a term for empirical explorations that show changes occurring in an environment in clear connection to power.

=== Actor-oriented power perspectives ===
According to the actor-oriented power perspectives, power is exercised by actors which are contrary to the presumption of power being perceived as a force likely to pass individuals with no consciousness. Fredrik Engelstad, a Norwegian sociologist explained the concept of power as the combination of relationality, causality, and intentionality. The implication of this is that actors are perceived as power carriers in a significant way by which through action a certain intention (intentionality) is achieved, action occurs between at least two actors (relationality), and intended results are produced by action (causality). Viewing the power perspective from the angle of actor-oriented, Dowding submitted that power is linked to the agency, and this does not take away the importance of structure. Rather, while seen actor's use of power as a constraint, it is also propelled by structures.

The contributions made by actor-oriented power theory were given by Max Weber, when he explained power to be people’s ability to the realization of their wills irrespective of the resistance posed by others. An instance given by Robert Dahl is the case where actor A exercises power over actor B by getting actor B to execute a task that actor B will otherwise not do. The extreme case of this is when some group of individuals is mandated to carry out the task contrary to their thought or will.

Svarstad, Benjaminsen, and Overå held that the theory of actor-oriented power help in providing conceptual distinctions with useful insight into the theoretical elements that are vital in studying political ecology. While there are actors who either exercise or try to put power into use in diverse ways, there are also actors who encounter resistance from their oppositions and other forces. An instance of these forces is resisting the fulfilment of actors' intentions by other opposition who are more powerful. It can also come in the form of institutional structural constraints emanating from the outcome of intended actions.

The use of power by actors who exercise environmental interventions and actors who resist such interventions is often the emphasis of scholars of political ecology. However, when environmental interventions result in environmental degradations, scholars of political ecology throw their support to actors who resist such exercise of environmental interventions. Actors exercising environmental interventions include corporate organizations, governmental and non-governmental organizations while actors that resist them include groups such as peasants, fishermen, or pastoralists, by exercising counter-power using various kinds of resistance, or active involvement.

=== Neo-Marxist power perspectives ===
Amongst the foundations of political ecology is the political economy thought of Marxist which centered on the inequalities that emerged from global capitalism. However, the power perspectives of Marx are most likely highlighted even though there are several perspectives of power in political ecology influenced directly or indirectly by Marx. The Marxist main focus under capitalism is in relation to class and the stability of reproducing this class relation. Marx also placed human agency as the most important of his power concept with the human agency being socially conditioned as seen in his 1852 quote below:

"Men make their history, but they do not make it as they please; they do not make it under self-selected circumstances, but under circumstances existing already, given and transmitted from the past".

Thus, Marx's power theory which formed his perspective of power is the understanding of human agency as being constrained by social structure. As structure produces the potential and extent for power exertion, the human agency is reproducing the structure. This is illustrated by Isaac using the powerful David Rockefeller as quoted below:

"But a social theory of power must explain what kinds of social relations exist and how power is distributed by these relations, such that it is possible for David Rockefeller to have the power that he has. To do this is not to deny that it is he who possesses this power, nor to deny those personal attributes determining the particular manner in which he exercises it. It is simply to insist that the power individuals possess has social conditions of existence and that it is these conditions that should be the primary focus of theoretical analysis".

=== Poststructuralist power perspectives ===
The poststructuralist power perspective is the domain of Michel Foucault’s work with its application in political ecology. The poststructuralist power perspectives can be in three dimensions such as; biopower, governmentality, and discursive power.

Biopower indicates that to secure life, governments are concerned with the improvement of health and quality of life among populations. Foucault in his work explained how through the knowledge of power, people have learned how they should behave. In so doing, Foucault separates sovereign power from bio-power. Where sovereign power is termed "take life or let live", the bio-power "make life or let die". While human as specie is continuously elaboration in conformity to nature, the superior one will intervene, acting on the environmental condition if the species of human are to be altered. Therefore, bio-power aim in terms of governance and knowledge is to ascertain environmental issues as core concerns.

Political ecology emphasized that understanding how power works in environmental governance follows Foucault’s notion of “governmentality”. Foucault sees governmentality as the means employed by the government to make its citizens behave in line with the priorities of government. Fletcher separates governmentality into four kinds. First is "discipline" which ensures that the citizens internalize specific manners like ethical standards and social norms. The second is the "truth" which is a way of governing citizens using truth-defining standards like religion. The third is "Neoliberal rationality" which is a motivational structure formed and used to improve outcomes. The fourth is "Sovereign power" used to govern based on rules and punishment for faulting the rules. According to Fletcher, these governmentalities may conflict, work alone, or overlap. Also, the first two are dependent on humans believing government priorities, the second two do not but are seen as of importance.

Lastly, "discursive power" manifest when actors (corporate organization, governmental, and non-governmental organizations) make people or groups imbibe and add to the reproduction of the discourses they produce. Unlike in other fields, in political ecology, discourses are studied in line with a critical realist epistemology. There are instances where the formation of discursive power is traced to a state’s colonial era when efforts are made in the appropriation of new territories. Going by the basis of Foucault's political-ecological discursive power, it becomes imperative to mention that, there exist various perspectives to those of Foucault with wider space for human agency.

Comparing between bio-power, governmentality, and discursive power, both governmentality, and discursive power can be regarded as a theoretical perspective with significant importance while bio-power can be regarded as a topical concern identified by Foucault as the core of modern-day governments.

== Colonial legacies ==
Political ecology is used as a lens to understand environmental challenges in the context of colonial exploitation and socioeconomic inequalities. Uneven distribution of environmental burdens and benefits is often linked to policies, governance structures and power relations rooted in the colonial past of ecosystems, communities and states. Political ecology asks how today's environmental problems are linked to past conditions such as colonialism, and how this shapes their future.

Direct examples of the relevance of colonial history and political ecology include the uneven impact of climate change and climate vulnerability; labor relations on tea estates in former colonies, where owners still benefit from the legacies of indentured labours and slavery; forest governance and new plantations (for example palm oil); or new forms of enclosures built on principles similar to the colonial expropriation of land and water from Indigenous and local communities.

== Subfields ==
=== Feminist political ecology ===
Feminist political ecology is a feminist approach within political ecology that draws on various theoretical traditions, including Marxism, post-structuralism, feminist geography, ecofeminism, and cultural ecology. It uses intersectional frameworks within and between these traditions to explore ecological and political issues, including development, landscape, resource use, agrarian reconstruction, and rural-urban transformation.

Scholars in this field argue that gender is an important factor in shaping access to, control over, and knowledge of natural resources, and that mainstream environmental policies often rely on gender-neutral assumptions that can overlook women's knowledge of resource management. According to some scholars, such policies reflect a traditional decision-making framework that draws a binary distinction between "scientific knowledge" and "local experience", leading to some development discourse presenting women as victims of environmental change rather than as political actors. From a postcolonial perspective, policies lacking gender consideration may be seen as a continuation of colonial assumptions that devalue non-Western forms of ecological knowledge.

=== Political ecology of water ===
The political ecology of water explores how water shapes and is shaped by relations of power. Studies in the subfield include research on irrigation, water grabbing, infrastructure, waterscapes, and rivers, creating intersections with disciplines such as agrarian studies.

=== Political ecology of pesticides ===
Political ecologies of pesticides have long explored the social and ecological effects of pesticide use. Foundational works have centered on the ‘Circle of Poison’, which refers to the practice where pesticides banned in the Global North are still made there, exported to the Global South for use on export crops, and return north as residues on imported crops. Although the Circle of Poison thesis served to highlight uneven exposure and harm from pesticides along a classic dependency axis, its assumptions failed to account for major changes in the political ecology of pesticides since at least the early 2000s. The dynamics of global pesticide use, supply, and regulation have undergone significant transformations, sparking new interest from the social sciences. China-centered generic production and trade networks have facilitated access to pesticides in farm systems that previously used few inputs, while weed and pest resistance has increased loads in genetically modified seed packages whose corporate promoters claimed the opposite. The implications of these changes for the health of agricultural workers, agrarian livelihoods, social and environmental health, and food systems remain unclear. Political ecologies of pesticides have addressed these issues through the ‘global pesticide complex’, an analytical framework to study interactions between agricultural practice, the agrochemical industry, regulatory actions, and knowledge of toxicity. Almost fifty years of research on the political ecologies of pesticides explores old and new agrarian questions in contemporary contexts.

== Criticism ==
Political ecology has strengths and weaknesses. At its core, it contextualizes political and ecological explanations of human behavior. As Walker points out, though, it has failed to offer “compelling counter-narratives” to “widely influential and popular yet deeply flawed and unapologetic neo-Malthusian rants such as Robert Kaplan's (1994) 'The coming anarchy' and Jared Diamond's (2005) Collapse." Ultimately, Walker holds, applying political ecology to policy decisions – especially in the US and Western Europe – will prove difficult as long as there is resistance to Marxist and neo-Marxist thinking.

Andrew Vayda and Bradley Walters (1999) criticize political ecologists for presupposing “the importance ... of certain kinds of political factors in the explanation of environmental changes” (167). Vayda and Walter's response to overly political approaches in political ecology is to encourage what they call “event ecology”, focusing on human responses to environmental events without presupposing the impact of political processes on environmental events. The critique has not been taken up widely. One example of work that builds on event ecology, in order to add a more explicit focus on the role of power dynamics and the need for including local peoples' voices is Penna-Firme (2013) "Political and Event Ecology: critiques and opportunities for collaboration".

== History ==
In international perspective, the origins of political ecology can be traced through different traditions, including the Anglo-American tradition as well as the Latin American and French ecología política and écologie politique. The English term "political ecology" was first coined by Frank Thone in an article published in 1935. It has been widely used since then in the context of human geography and human ecology, but with no systematic definition. Anthropologist Eric R. Wolf gave it a second life in 1972 in an article entitled "Ownership and Political Ecology", in which he discusses how local rules of ownership and inheritance "mediate between the pressures emanating from the larger society and the exigencies of the local ecosystem", but did not develop the concept further. Other origins include other early works of Eric R. Wolf, Michael J. Watts, Susanna Hecht, and others in the 1970s and 1980s.

The origins of the field in the 1970s and 1980s were a result of the development of development geography and cultural ecology, particularly the work of Piers Blaikie on the sociopolitical origins of soil erosion. His work revealed common misconceptions of the origins of environmental problems which are often blamed on local people misusing the resources instead of the wider socio-economic and political context.

Historically, political ecology has focused on phenomena in and affecting the developing world; since the field's inception, "research has sought primarily to understand the political dynamics surrounding material and discursive struggles over the environment in the third world".

== Political ecologists ==
Some prominent contemporary scholars include:

- Anthony Bebbington
- Piers Blaikie
- Murray Bookchin
- Harold Brookfield
- Raymond L. Bryant
- Michael R. Dove
- Robyn Eckersley
- Arturo Escobar
- Andre Gorz
- Félix Guattari
- Susanna Hecht
- Ivan Illich
- Giorgos Kallis
- Alain Lipietz
- Philippe Le Billon
- William Moseley
- Richard Peet
- Paul Robbins
- Ariel Salleh
- Farhana Sultana
- Erik Swyngedouw
- Bhaskar Vira
- Michael Watts
- Paige West
- Karl Zimmerer

== Related journals ==
Scholarly journals that have been key to the development and critique of this field include:

- Annals of the Association of American Geographers
- Antipode
- Capitalism Nature Socialism
- Development and Change
- Journal of Peasant Studies
- Ecological Economics
- Ecology
- Economic Geography
- Environment and Planning
- Futures
- Gender, Place & Culture
- Geoforum
- Human Ecology
- Journal of Political Ecology
- New Left Review
- Progress in Human Geography
- Progress in Physical Geography
- Oryx (journal)

== See also ==
- Agroecology
- Criticism of capitalism
- Cultural ecology
- Development geography
- Ecofeminism
- Ecological crisis
- Eco-socialism
- Ecogovernmentality
- Environmental justice
- Environmental Politics
- Environmental racism
- Environmental sociology
- Feminist political ecology
- Green nationalism
- Human behavioral ecology
- List of ecology topics
- Political economy
- Social ecology
- Social-ecology
