= Kallis (surname) =

Kallis is a surname. Notable people with the name include:

- Aristotle Kallis (born 1970), British historian
- Bjarne Kallis (born 1945), Finnish politician
- Christos Kallis (born 1998), Cypriot football player
- Danny Kallis (born 1957), American television writer and producer
- George Kallis, Cypriot film and TV composer
- Giorgos Kallis (born 1972), Greek ecological economist
- Jacques Kallis (born 1975), South African cricketer
- Oskar Kallis (1892–1918), Estonian artist
