= Susanna Hecht =

American geographer and academic

Susanna B. Hecht is an American geographer, professor of Urban Planning at UCLA and professor of international history at the Graduate Institute of International and Development Studies in Geneva.

== Life and work ==
Her early work on the deforestation of the Amazon led to the founding of the subfield of political ecology. This subfield of geography embraces sociology, economics, history, literature, ecology, environmental studies and a wide variety of other fields in an effort to paint a more intricate picture of a particular geographic region and the influence it has on the world around it as well as how the world impacts the region. The Amazon rainforest is her primary subject of inquiry and she is the co-author of the book, Fate of the Forest: Destroyers, Developers and Defenders of the Amazon with Alexander Cockburn, originally published in 1990, but which has been updated and reissued by the University of Chicago Press in 2010. In 2004, Fate of the Forest was named one of the most influential books in cultural geography by the American Association of Geography. The book has become a classic text in environmental studies, and has won numerous awards. She is widely considered a preeminent authority on forest transition and sustainable agriculture. In addition to her academic work, she has also written popular articles for the Nation, New Left Review and Fortune magazine.

Hecht received her A.B. from the University of Chicago and her Ph.D. in Geography from the University of California, Berkeley. She was awarded the prestigious John Simon Guggenheim fellowship in 2008 and has received fellowships and grants from NASA, the National Science Foundation, The Pew Charitable Trust, the MacArthur Foundation, The Ford Foundation, and many others. She has also been a resident fellow at the Institute for Advanced Study in Princeton and the Center for the Advanced Study of the Behavioral Sciences at Stanford University.

In 2018, she was awarded the David Livingstone Centenary Medal of the American Geographical Society.

== Recent publications ==
- Susanna Hecht, 2013, The Scramble for the Amazon and the "Lost Paradise" of Euclides da Cunha, Chicago: University of Chicago Press.
- Susanna Hecht; Alexander Cockburn, 2010, The fate of the forest : developers, destroyers, and defenders of the Amazon, Updated Edition. Chicago: University of Chicago Press.
- Susanna Hecht, 2008, Kayapo Savanna Management: Fire, Soils and Reforestation in a Threatened Biome. W. Woods (Ed). Amazon Soils: Essays in Honor of Wim Sombroek, Berlin. Springer Verlag
- Susanna Hecht, 2007, Globalization and Forest Recovery in Inhabited Landscapes. Bioscience Vol 57(8) 663-672
- Susanna Hecht, 2007, Forests, Fields and Family: Women and Children in the Extractive Economies of Acre, Brazil, Journal of Agrarian Change. Vol 7 (3) 316-347
- Susanna Hecht, 2006, Forest Resurgence, Social Process and Environmental Politics in El Salvador. World Development Vol 34 (2) 308-323. (with S. Kandel, H. Rosa, I. Gomes, N. Cuellar)
- Susanna Hecht, 2005, Soybean Production, Development and Conservation on an Amazon Frontier. Development and Change, V. 36 (2) 375-404
- Susanna Hecht, 2004, The Last Unfinished Page of Genesis: Euclides da Cunha and the Amazon. Historical Geography Vol 2:43-69.
- Susanna Hecht, 2004, Indigenous Soil Management and the Creation of Amazonian Dark Earths: Implications of Kayapo Practices in Johannes Lehman (Ed) Amazonian Dark Earths: Origins, Properties and Management of Fertile Soils in the Humid Tropics, Kluwer. Dorecht, pp. 355–373.

== Interviews with Susanna Hecht ==
- "A Scientist Extols the Value of Forests Shaped by Humans," Interview with Susanna Hecht in the newsletter of the Yale School of Forestry and Environmental Studies
- Cockburn, Alexander (January–February 1989). "Introduction to Hecht interview". New Left Review. I (173). New Left Review.
