= Piers Blaikie =

British geographer

Piers Macleod Blaikie
- Born: 29 January 1942 (age 84); Helensburgh, Scotland
- Occupation: Academic
- Known for: Political ecology

Piers Macleod Blaikie (born 29 January 1942) is a Scottish geographer and scholar of international development and natural resources, who worked until 2003 at the School of Development Studies, University of East Anglia. His contribution to development has been in four areas: environment, agrarian change, AIDS and family planning, and political ecology.

== Background ==
Blaikie was born in wartime Scotland, in Helensburgh. He was educated at Gonville and Caius College, Cambridge, where he read the Geography Tripos (1964) and completed a PhD (1971). He lectured in geography at the University of Reading from 1968 to 1972, before spending 33 years at the University of East Anglia, in the School of Development Studies, where he eventually became Professor. He retired in 2003 but remained professionally active.

== Major contributions ==
Of all his work his best known is the small volume published in 1985 Political Economy of Soil Erosion in Developing Countries. In this book, and elsewhere, he argues that soil erosion should not only, or even mainly, be thought of as being the result of mismanagement, overpopulation or for environmental reasons but can often be due to the effects of political economy on poor farmers. His earliest work was based on the case of Nepal, where the marginalisation of peasant farmers onto steep slopes has resulted in erosion. Blaikie writes "A principal conclusion of this book is that soil erosion in lesser developed countries will not be substantially reduced unless it seriously threatens the accumulation possibilities of the dominant classes" (p. 147).

Blaikie's legacy from this book was the beginnings of regional political ecology, a particular approach to understanding the economic and political drivers of resource degradation and particularly the lack of access to natural resources suffered by poor or marginalised people. In Land Degradation and Society (1987) the approach received further development. Blaikie regards an environmental problem as rooted in processes operating at different nested scales, moving from the local to the international political economy. The job of the political ecologist is to work out how these scaled factors interrelate. In AIDS in Africa Blaikie and UEA colleague Tony Barnett applied the approach to understanding the contemporary AIDS crisis in Africa, based on substantial fieldwork in East Africa.

The first edition of At Risk (1994) applied the approach once again to a range of so-called 'natural' disasters, which were found to be significantly magnified by inequality and capitalist greed, leaving affected people in a 'reproduction squeeze'. This they called the 'pressure-release model', where root causes – power, structures, resources, political systems, economic systems lie behind disaster pressures – e.g. lack of local institutions, rapid urbanisation. These lead to unsafe conditions – physical environment, local economy, vulnerability, public actions. On the physical side of the equation is a natural hazard. Risk=hazard+vulnerability.

By this stage in the 1990s, political ecology had 'arrived' as a framework in the social sciences, and critiques began to be heard concerning the rigidities of some aspects of the framework. At Risk was rewritten and reissued in 2004, responding to these criticisms.

== Recognition ==
- Honorary doctorate, Norwegian University of Science and Technology, 2009.
- Winner, Netting Award, Association of American Geographers, 2009.
- Listed in Simon D. (ed.) 2006. Fifty Key Thinkers on Development.
- The subject of a special issue of the journal Geoforum (2008) "In Honor of the Life work of Piers Blaikie in Political Ecology and Development Studies". Geoforum 39, 687–772.
- June 2004. The Royal Geographical Society Edward Heath Award for published work on Africa and Asia.
- January 2000. Life member of the Royal Norwegian Society of Sciences and Letters, Trondheim.
- An annual Piers Blaikie Lecture on Politics of the Environment was begun at the University of East Anglia in 2011.

== Books ==
- Blaikie, P.M. (2022). Far Flung Fragments. Gatehouse Press. ISBN 1915424283. Collection of autobiographical short stories.
- Blaikie, P.M. and R. Lund. (2015). The Tsunami of 2004 in Sri Lanka: Impacts and Policy in the Shadow of Civil War. Routledge.
- Brun C., M. Jones and P.M. Blaikie (eds.) 2014. Alternative Development: Unravelling Marginalization, Voicing Change. Ashgate. ISBN 978-1-4724-0934-8
- Springate-Baginski, O and Blaikie, P.M.(eds) (2007) Forests, People and Power: the Political Ecology of Reform in South Asia. London: Earthscan. ISBN 978-1-84407-347-4.
- Ben Wisner, Piers Blaikie, Terry Cannon and Ian Davis (2004) At Risk: Natural Hazards, People’s Vulnerability and Disasters. London, Routledge. 2nd edition. ISBN 0-415-25216-4.
- Blaikie, P.M. and Sadeque, Z. (2000) Policy in High Places: Environment and Development in the Himalayas. Nepal: International Centre for Integrated Mountain Development. ISBN 92-9115-233-1.
- De Haan, L. and Blaikie, P.M (eds) (1998) Looking at Maps in the Dark: Directions for Geographical Research in Land Management and Sustainable Development in Rural and Urban Environments in the Third World. Utrecht/Amsterdam: Netherlands Geographical Studies. ISSN 0169-4839.
- Blaikie, PM and S Jeanrenaud. (1995) Biodiversity and Human Welfare. Discussion Paper No.72. Geneva: UNRISD.
- Blaikie, P.M, Biot, Y., Jackson, C & Palmer-Jones, R. (1995) Rethinking Land Degradation in Developing Countries. World Bank Discussion Paper No. 289. Washington DC: World Bank. ISBN 0-8213-3329-1
- Blaikie, P.M. 1994. Political Ecology in the 1990s: An Evolving View of Nature and Society. CASID Distinguished Speaker Series No. 13. Centre for Advanced Study of International Development, Michigan State University, USA.
- Blaikie, P.M. Cannon, T., Davis, I., & Wisner, B.(1994) At Risk: Natural Hazards, People's Vulnerability and Disasters. London: Routledge. ISBN 0-415-08476-8. 1st edition. Spanish edition 1997.
- Blaikie PM and Barnett, AS 1992. AIDS in Africa. London: Belhaven Press (Reprinted by John Wiley, London in 1994). Also Guildford Press, New York. ISBN 1-85293-115-9.
- Blaikie, P.M. and T. Unwin (eds.). 1988. Environmental crises in developing countries. Monograph 5, Developing Areas Research Group, Institute of British Geographers. ISBN 0946689024
- Blaikie PM and Harold Brookfield (1987) Land Degradation and Society. London: Methuen ISBN 0-416-40140-6.
- Blaikie PM (1985) The Political Economy of Soil Erosion in Developing Countries. London: Longman. Reprinted by Pearson Education in 2000. ISBN 978-0-582-30089-7, and 0 470 20419 2 (USA only).
- Blaikie PM Cameron J. and Seddon J.D.(1980). Nepal in Crisis: Growth and Stagnation at the Periphery. Delhi: Adroit Publishers. ISBN 0-19-828414-4. Republished with new chapter in 2000. Oxford University Press, London and Delhi.
- Blaikie PM Cameron J. and Seddon J.D. (1980) Struggle for Basic Needs: a case study in Nepal. OECD Monograph Series. Paris: OECD Development Centre.
- Blaikie, P.M. Seddon J.D. and Cameron J. Aris (1979) Peasants and Workers in Nepal. Warminster: Phillips. ISBN 0-85668-112-1. 214 pps.
- Blaikie, P.M. (1975) Family Planning in India: Diffusion and Policy. London: Edward Arnold, London.
