= Peru Support Group =

The Peru Support Group (PSG) is a non-profit, non-partisan advocacy organisation in the United Kingdom established in 1983 to support the people of Peru. During the crisis of the 1980s, PSG helped to renegotiate Peruvian foreign debt in an effort to channel funds to poverty relief. In the 1990s, it campaigned to raise awareness of human rights violations in Peru during the presidency of Alberto Fujimori.

One of the founders of the Peru Support Group was economist Rosemary Thorp. As of 2026, Lord John Alderdice, a Liberal Democrat in the House of Lords, is president of PSG. The chair of the elected steering committee is John Crabtree of the Oxford University Latin American Centre. Other notable sponsors of the organisation have included renowned British writers Harold Pinter and Graham Greene.

The organisation today campaigns on a wide range of issues including: human rights and democratic governance and sustainable development, particularly with reference to extractive industries. In 2006, PSG formed an independent delegation to visit the Department of Piura in Peru to monitor and report on the conflict surrounding the Rio Blanco Project. PSG holds an annual conference in the UK.

== Publications ==
- Bebbington, A.J, M. Connarty, W. Coxshall, H. O'Shaugnessy, M. Williams. 2007. Mining and development in Peru, with special reference to the Rio Blanco Project, Piura. London. Peru Support Group. Translated and published in Peru as: Bebbington, A.J, M. Connarty, W. Coxshall, H.O'Shaugnessy, M. Williams. Minería y Desarrollo en Perú con especial referencia al Proyecto Río Blanco, Piura. Lima. Instituto de Estudios Peruanos/CIPCA/Oxfam International/Peru Support Group.
- Low, P. 2012.Artisanal and Small-Scale Mining in Peru: A Blessing or a Curse?. London. Peru Support Group.
