= Harold Brookfield =

British and Australian geographer (1926–2022)

- Born: Harold Chillingworth Brookfield; 9 March 1926; London
- Died: 22 May 2022 (aged 96)

Academic background
- Education: London School of Economics (BA, PhD)

Academic work
- Discipline: human geography, cultural ecology rural development
- School or tradition: cultural ecology
- Institutions: Australian National University

Harold Chillingworth Brookfield (March 9, 1926 in England - May 22, 2022 in Canberra) was a British and Australian geographer specialising in the analysis of rural development, small-scale societies, family farming, and the relationship between land use and society in developing countries. He retired from the Australian National University in 1991.

== Background ==
Harold Brookfield was born in 1926 and grew up in North London, England. He attended Minchenden Grammar School from 1937–1943. He joined the RAF in 1943 and trained as ground crew. In 1946 the government offered university scholarships to qualified servicemen, so he took a BSc degree in geography, graduating in 1949 from the London School of Economics and Political Science, University of London. His PhD followed in 1950, a study of post-eighteenth century urban development in coastal Sussex. However interests soon shifted to rural issues in developing nations.

His academic positions were:

- Assistant lecturer in Geography, Birkbeck College, University of London, from 1948–1952.
- Lecturer and head, Department of Geography, University of Natal in Durban, 1952–1955.
- University of New England, 1955–1957.
- Fellow, Australian National University (ANU), 1957–1969.
- Professor, Pennsylvania State University, 1969–1971 (he resigned).
- Professor, McGill University, 1971–1976, including a Guggenheim Fellowship.
- Chair of Geography, University of Melbourne, 1976–1982.
- Professor, ANU, 1982–1991.
- Emeritus professor, ANU 1991–2022.
- Also project Director and researcher with PLEC until the early 2000s.

He was also an Honorary Fellow at the Institute of Development Studies, University of Sussex in the 1970s.

He led the UNESCO Man and the Biosphere Programme in Fiji.

== Contributions ==
Brookfield's research was primarily dedicated to the study of rural societies and the environment in developing nations. He emphasises field studies at the microlevel, drawing on understandings from a range of disciplines. He developed close comparative research methods, identified with cultural ecology to understand rural societies and particularly food-getting activities and farming systems. Brookfield wrote that his abiding concern was the ‘… adaptation of the use and management of land to variability and change in society, economy and natural environment'; this he called the 'soul' of geography (Brookfield, 2004, 40). He was always ‘... drawn back to the practice and oftentimes humbling experience of fieldwork in distant farmlands, forests, islands and mountains of the developing world' (Connell and Waddell, 2005, 130). Particularly while working at the ANU, beginning in Papua New Guinea, he worked on the 'how' and the 'why' of land use, agrarian systems, and rural development. This came to be known as the 'Brookfield school' of analysis.

Brookfield's book 'Interdependent Development', written in 1975 was lauded as a classic (Corbridge, 1996; O’Connor, 1996). It started a ‘... theoretical backlash against the irrelevance of several geographical traditions', and argued for a more historical and green/environmental perspective, based on empirical research (Connell and Rugendyke, 2005, 58). His collaboration with Piers Blaikie produced one of the key political ecology texts, 'Land Degradation and Society' in 1987.

The United Nations University's Project on People, Land, Management and Environmental Change (PLEC) was a major comparative initiative begun by Brookfield and others, looking at different land use trajectories and how farming actually creates positive biodiversity in the tropics. It promoted farmers as experts. It started in 1992 and was latterly funded by the Global Environmental Facility until 2002. It has resulted in many substantial works.

== Recognition ==
- Fellow of the British Academy (2009)
- Australia-International Medal of the Institute of Australian Geographers (2005)
- Robert McC. Netting Award (1997), Association of American Geographers (1997). see Waddell, E. 1997. Harold Chilingworth Brookfield.
- 'Laureat D'Honneur' of the International Geographical Union (1996)
- Fellow of the Academy of the Social Sciences in Australia (1977)
- Back Award of the Royal Geographical Society for Geographical Studies of the Pacific region (1975)
- Fellow of the J.S. Guggenheim Foundation (1973)

== Major publications ==
- Brookfield, H.C. 2008. Family farms are still around: time to invert the old agrarian question? Geography Compass 2 (1): 108–126.
- Brookfield, H.C. and H. Parsons 2007. Family Farms: Survival and Prospect. A world-wide Analysis. London: Routledge.
- Brookfield, H.C., H. Parsons and M. Brookfield (eds.) 2003. Agrodiversity: Learning from Farmers Across the World. Tokyo: United Nations University Press.
- Brookfield H.C., C. Padoch, H. Parsons and M. Stocking. 2002. Cultivating Biodiversity: Understanding, Analysing and Using Agricultural Diversity. Rugby: ITDG Publications.
- Brookfield, H.C. 2001. Exploring Agrodiversity. New York: Columbia University Press.
- Brookfield, H.C. 2001. Intensification and alternative approaches to agricultural change. Asia Pacific Viewpoint 42: 181–192.
- Brookfield, H.C., Potter, L. and Byron, Y. 1995. In Place of the Forest: Environmental and Social Transformation in Borneo and Eastern Malay Peninsula. Tokyo: United Nations University Press.
- Brookfield H.C., L. Doube, B. Banks. 1994. Transformation with Industrialization in Peninsular Malaysia. Oxford University Press.
- Brookfield H.C., and Y. Byron (eds.) 1993. South-East Asia's Environmental Future: the Search for Sustainability. United Nations University Press.
- Brookfield, H.C., Hadi, A.S. and Mahmud, Z. 1991. The City in the Village: the in situ Urbanisation of Villages, Villagers and their Land around Kuala Lumpur, Malaysia. Oxford University Press.
- Brookfield, H.C., T.P. Bayliss-Smith, R.Bedford and M. Latham. 1988. Islands, Islanders and the World: the Colonial and Post-colonial Experience of Eastern Fiji. Cambridge University Press.
- Blaikie, P. and Brookfield, H.C. 1987. Land Degradation and Society. London: Methuen.
- Brookfield H.C., F.Ellis and R.G. Ward. 1986. Land, Cane and Coconuts : Papers on the Rural Economy of Fiji. Australian National University.
- Brookfield, H. C. 1979. Lakeba : environmental change, population dynamics and resource use . Canberra: Australian National University for UNESCO.
- Brookfield H.C., R.D. Bedford et al., 1977. Population, Resources and Development in the Eastern Islands of Fiji: information for decision-making. Canberra : Development Studies Centre, Australian National University for UNESCO.
- Brookfield, H.C. 1975. Interdependent Development. London: Methuen.
- Brookfield, H.C. 1973. The Pacific in Transition. London: Edward Arnold
- Brookfield, H.C. 1972. Colonialism, Development and Independence: The Case of the Melanesian Islands in the South Pacific. Cambridge University Press.
- Brookfield, H.C. and D. Hart. 1971. Melanesia: A Geographical Interpretation of an Island World. London: Methuen.
- Brookfield, H. C. (ed.) 1969. Pacific market-places; a collection of essays. Canberra: Australian National University Press.
- Brookfield, H. C. and P. Brown. 1969. The people of Vila: report on a census of a Pacific Island town. Canberra: Australian National University Research School of Pacific Studies.
- Brookfield, H.C. and P. Brown. 1963. Struggle for Land: agriculture and group territories among the Chimbu of the New Guinea highlands . Oxford University Press.
- Brookfield, H.C. 1962. Local study and comparative method: An example from central New Guinea. Annals of the Association of American Geographers 52, 242–254.
- Brown, P. & Brookfield, H. C. 1959. Chimbu land and society . Glebe: Australasian Medical Publishing Company.
