= Frank Thone =

American science writer

Frank Thone (1891–1949) was a noted American science writer. Having been, in 1922, awarded a doctorate in botany from the University of Chicago and after a spell as ranger in Yellowstone National Park he built a successful career as a popular journalist for the Science Service. He served as their Science Service biology editor from 1924 to 1949 and produced the widely syndicated column "Nature Ramblings". Two of the noted stories he covered were the Scopes monkey trial (1925) and the Bikini atoll atomic bomb tests (1946). He also hosted the Science Talent Search on an Adventures in Science radio broadcasts.

Thone (1935) is cited by Minch as coining the term Political Ecology (Later popularized by the anthropologist Eric Wolf (1972)).

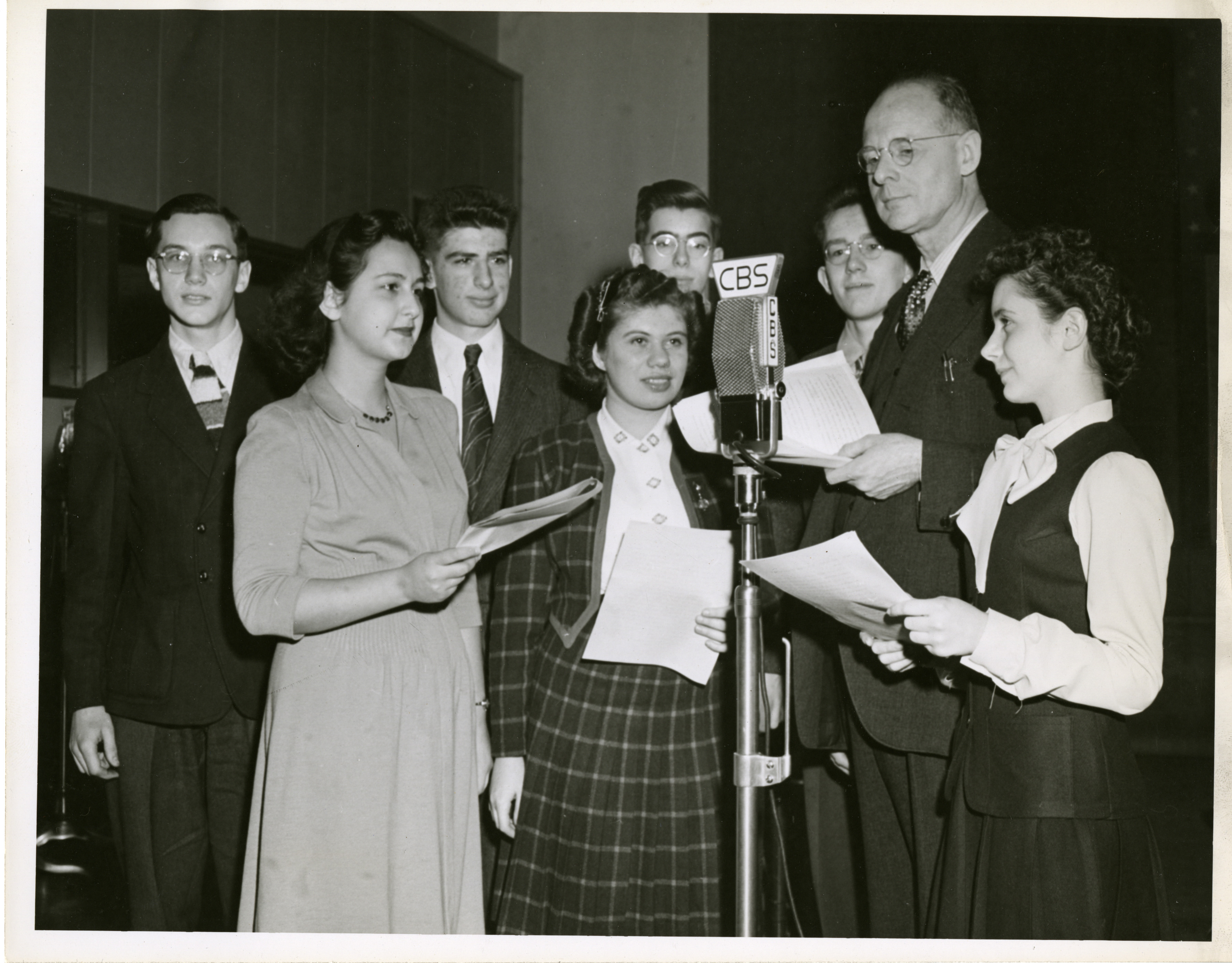
Frank Thone (1891–1949) interviewing Science Talent Search finalists, 1945

== Awards ==
- 1946, recipient of George Westinghouse distinguished science writing awards.

== Selected publications ==
- Thone, Frank and United States National Park Service. (1923). Trees and Flowers of Yellowstone National Park. Saint Paul: J.E. Haynes.
- Thone F. (1935). Nature Ramblings: We Fight for Grass, Science News, Vol. 27 No. 717, January
- Thone, Frank (1940) The Microscopic World, J. Messner, Incorporated
