= Anthony Bebbington =

British-American geographer

Anthony J. Bebbington
- Born: 1962 (age 63–64); Stoke-on-Trent, England
- Education: University of Cambridge M.A. Clark University PhD.
- Awards: Australian Laureate Fellowship (2016)
- Scientific career
- Fields: human geography, development studies, political ecology
- Workplaces: University of Melbourne; Clark University; University of Manchester; University of Colorado; University of Cambridge

Anthony Bebbington (born 1962) is a geographer, International Director for Natural Resources and Climate Change at the Ford Foundation and Higgins Professor of Environment and Society in the Graduate School of Geography, Clark University, USA (on leave). He was previously ARC Laureate Professor at the School of Geography, University of Melbourne, Australia (2016–2019).

== Background ==
Tony Bebbington was born and raised in Staffordshire, England, studied geography and land economy at the University of Cambridge where he graduated with distinction, and completed a PhD at the Graduate School of Geography, Clark University, USA in 1990, supervised by Billie Lee Turner II. He holds British and American citizenship.

He held a postdoctoral appointment in Latin American Studies at Cambridge (1989–1992), before working at two London research organizations: the Overseas Development Institute (1992–4) and the International Institute for Environment and Development (1994–5). He moved to the USA again in 1995, working at the World Bank (1995–6, 1999–2000) and as associate professor of geography, University of Colorado, Boulder (1996–2003) before moving to the University of Manchester, UK as Professor.

== Contributions ==
Bebbington's early work was on farmer knowledge, livelihoods, and agrarian change in mountain communities of Peru and Ecuador. He made distinctive contributions to human geography and to understanding of rural development in the Andes, combining detailed fieldwork with farming households with broader understanding of rural institutions and social movements. He has retained an interest in theory, scholarship, and practical development issues.

This interest in rural organizations and social movements led to research on the performance and practice on non-governmental organizations in Latin America, expressed in several books on NGOs and their contributions to development. After working in social policy at the World Bank, he became interested in how the World Bank works with NGOs, and particularly the use of 'social capital' in the World Bank's work. Recent studies have been of mining, development, and the state in Peru and Ecuador, and the nature of protest surrounding mining proposals, funded by an ESRC research professorship, ARC Laureate Fellowship, and other grants.

He has worked most often in the Andes, elsewhere in South and Central America, and briefly in Indonesia and Nepal.

Bebbington has also collaborated with United Nations Research Institute For Social Development on the flagship report Combating Poverty and Inequality (2010); a project for which he wrote a background thematic paper Poverty Reduction and Social Movements: A Framework with Cases. Additionally, he collaborated on the project Financing Social Policy (2006–2010).

== Recognition ==
- Laureate Fellowship, Australian Research Council, 2017-2022 (resigned, 2019)
- Fellow of the National Academy of Sciences, 2009.
- Fellow of the American Academy of Arts and Sciences, 2014.
- Guggenheim Fellowship, 2014.
- CLAG (Conference of Latin Americanists Geographers) Carl O. Sauer Distinguished Scholarship Award, 2014.
- Robert Netting award for lifetime achievement, Cultural and Political Ecology Group, Association of American Geographers, 2010.
- Fellowship at the Center for Advanced Study in the Behavioral Sciences, Stanford University
- ESRC (UK) Professorial Fellowship to conduct research in Latin America (2007–2009).

== Publications ==
Books

- A.J. Bebbington, AA-G. Abdulai, D. Humphreys Bebbington, M. Hinfelaar and C. Sanborn. 2018. Governing Extractive Industries: Politics, Histories, Ideas. Oxford University Press.
- J. Berdegué, A.J. Bebbington, and J. Escobal (eds.) 2016. Growth, Poverty and Inequality in Sub-National Development: Learning from Latin America’s Territories. Special Issue of World Development 73:1-138.
- Bebbington A.J. (ed.) 2013. Industrias extractivas, conflicto social y dinámicas institucionales en la región andina. Lima. Instituto de Estudios Peruanos.
- Bebbington A.J. and J. Bury (eds.). 2013. Subterranean Struggles: New Dynamics of Mining, Oil and Gas in Latin America. Austin: University of Texas Press.
- Bebbington A.J. (ed.). 2012. Social Conflict, Economic Development and Extractive Industry: Evidence from South America. London: Routledge.
- Bebbington, A.J, S. Hickey and D Mitlin (eds). 2008. Can NGOs Make A Difference? The Challenge of Development Alternatives. London. Zed.
- Bebbington, A.J, A. Dani, A. de Haan, and M. Walton (eds.). 2008. Institutional Pathways to Equity: addressing inequality traps. London/Washington. Palgrave and World Bank.
- Bebbington, A.J, M. Connarty, W. Coxshall, H. O'Shaugnessy, M. Williams. 2007. Mining and development in Peru, with special reference to the Rio Blanco Project, Piura. London. Peru Support Group. Translated and published in Peru as: Bebbington, A.J, M. Connarty, W. Coxshall, H.O'Shaugnessy, M. Williams. Minería y Desarrollo en Perúcon especial referencia al Proyecto Río Blanco, Piura. Lima. Instituto de Estudios Peruanos/CIPCA/Oxfam International/Peru Support Group.
- Bebbington, A.J. and W. McCourt (eds.). 2007. Development success: statecraft in the South. London. Palgrave Macmillan.
- Bebbington, A.J. (ed.). 2007 Una ecología política de la minería moderna: movimientos sociales, empresas y desarrollo territorial. Lima. Instituto de Estudios Peruanos.
- Bebbington, A.J. (ed.). 2007. Investigación y cambio social: desafíos para las ONG en Centroamérica y México. Guatemala City. Editorial de Ciencias Sociales.
- Bebbington A.J., M. Woolcock, S. Guggenheim and E. Olson (eds.) 2006. The search for empowerment. Social Capital as idea and practice at the World Bank. West Hartford. Kumarian
- Bebbington A.J, and V.H.Torres. 2001. El capital social en los Andes. Quito. Abya-Yala.
- Bebbington A.J, D. Muñoz con A. Espinar, M. Canedo and S. Croxton 2000. Los campesinos y las políticas públicas: encuentros y desencuentros. La Paz. Editorial Plural.
- Riddell, R, A.J. Bebbington, L Peck. 1995. Promoting Development by Proxy: The Development Impact of Government Support to Swedish NGOs. Stockholm: SIDA. ISBN 91-586-7222-2, ISBN 978-91-586-7222-2
- Farringdon, J., Bebbington, A.J, K. Wellard, D.Lewis. 1993. Reluctant Partners?: Non-governmental Organizations, the State and Sustainable Agricultural Development. London: Routledge. ISBN 0-415-08843-7
- de Boef, W, K. Amanor, K. Wellard, A.J. Bebbington (eds.). 1993. Cultivating Knowledge: Genetic Diversity, Farmer Experimentation and Crop Research. Intermediate Technology Publications. ISBN 1-85339-204-9
- Bebbington A.J, G. Thiele, P. Davies. 1993. Non-governmental Organizations and the State in Latin America: Rethinking Roles in Sustainable Agricultural Development. London: Routledge. ISBN 0-415-08846-1
