= Knowledge regime =

A knowledge regime is a type of system involving a specific set of actors, organizations, and institutions that create policy ideas used to alter the organization and overall operation of the policy-making and production process. Knowledge regimes are beneficial for the implementation of public policy because they introduce new sets of data, research, theories, recommendations, and many other influential ideas directed towards an end goal of economic competition.

These regimes became increasingly important following WWII when many capitalist societies were facing long periods of high inflation and economic stagnation associated with high levels of unemployment. Following this era, knowledge regimes were used in the study of comparative political economies, which examined both policymaking regimes as well as production regimes. The information and policies that arises from knowledge regimes differs depending on the political economy that a state operates in.

In a liberal market economy (LME) with a decentralized, open market, the knowledge regimes tend to be more market-oriented, meaning there are less external constraints from the government. In open markets there is more competition between companies and actors, resulting in a more adversarial environment. In an LME with a more centralized and closed market, there is nonpartisan state-involvement, all the while in a hostile environment. In coordinated market economies (CME) with decentralized, open states, there are strong associational institutional arrangements, which results in more consensus-oriented knowledge regimes whereas in a CME with a centralized closed market, policy changes come from within the state.

Depending on the political economy of a state, there are four corresponding knowledge-producing organizations. The first organization is composed of scholars who have specific knowledge on a topic; these members tend to be university students and/or professors. Another organization is made up of advocacy research units with individuals who have dedicated their time to one given topic. A third organization includes the individuals closely associated with a political party who conduct research that will provide expert advice and analysis for party members. The last knowledge-producing organization includes state research units who are situated within the government and are readily available for members within the government at any given time.

== History ==
=== The fall of the Golden Age ===
Capitalist countries began acknowledging the importance of knowledge regimes following the end of the Golden Age; this period was characterized by economic stagflation, eventually leading to inflation throughout the 1970s and 1980s. Economic bubbles and crises occur as a result of the processes that countries previously adapted, typically over the past 30 years, which are ingrained into the economy and hard to alter. The high rates of stagflation that occurred in the mid 1960s after the end of the Golden Age created the questions of what the adequate policies would be in order to pursue macroeconomic goals of long-term economic growth. This era contradicted the traditional Keynesian policy ideas, which led many advanced countries to turn to the use of theories, data, and ideologies as tools in the fight over different economic policies. This placed heavy emphasis on the creation and use of knowledge regimes.

=== Neoliberalism and globalization ===
The end of the Golden Age introduced the era of neoliberalism, characterized by a decrease in public spending, lower taxes, and less state intervention. Through neoliberalism and neoliberal ways of operation, many capitalist countries began globalizing at increased rates, which brought about new forms of economic organizations, such as global outsourcing and international commodity chains. Given this level of globalization, knowledge regimes were developed to create new policies and advise firms on appropriate production measures.

== Varieties of capitalism ==
Varieties of capitalism is used to describe is used to describe the way a firm operates in two differentiating political capitalist economies, placing the emphasis on the state-firm relationship rather than the state-citizen relationship. The two political economies that nations will operate in are either liberal market economies (LMEs) or coordinated market economies (CMEs). There are five sectors that firms address when developing relationships with the state, including industrial relations, vocational training and education, corporate governance, inter-firm relations, and employees. Firms use the five sectors to design different policies that are best suited for their political economy.

=== Liberal market economies ===
Liberal market economies operate in capitalist nations that use a system of hierarchy and competitive markets to determine relationships between firms and the state. LMEs operate in highly commodified economies whereby there individuals are particularly dependent on the sale of their own labour as a reliable source of income. The commodification of labour is strongly affected by the price signals that are indicated by the markets, and these fluctuating price levels lead to either an increase or decrease in a firm's willingness to supply and a customer's willingness to consume. In liberal market economies, firms will use market mechanisms to solve any issues incurred, specifically through the exchange of money by buyers and sellers, who have a well-rounded understanding of the value of trade-offs so as to ensure the most efficient distribution of goods and services within an economy.

In a liberal market economy, firms require vocational education and training that is either individually funded or provided through on-the-job training to provide firm-specific education. These firms tend to focus their decisions on publicly accessible data of performance, allowing for greater venture capital and easily switchable assets that result in higher returns for investors. Due to the hierarchical nature of management, there are very few unions created in the work environment as labour is highly commodified and it is easy for a firm to hire and fire employees. The relationships between firms and employees operate on a contract basis. As a result of the individually funded vocational training, there is greater incentive to pursue individual success through innovation, which is generally funded by the larger venture capital opportunities.

LMEs can also operate alternatively, contingent on the type of market a state follows. If an economy has a more decentralized and open market, knowledge regimes will tend to be me more market-oriented with less external constraints from the government, as is the case with United States; if an economy is more centralized with a closed market, there is more state-led involvement and guidance, much like Great Britain.

==== United States ====
The United States of America is a country with a liberal market economy, accentuated by decentralized government with a relatively open market. Through the open market, firms and investors are able to import and export different goods and services with very little interference from the government, allowing for the price levels of those goods and services to be set solely by the supply and demand in the economy.

The political economy in the United States is run primarily by two political parties, the Republican Party and the Democratic Party. Since the United States is a highly decentralized state, the two main parties operate using privately funded resources, resulting in a distinct separation of power at the legislative and executive branches of government. The United States demonstrates how a decentralized open market economy tends to have more market-oriented knowledge regimes. Through privately funded channels, individuals have a higher incentive to create knowledge regimes in attempt to influence the public policy making process.

==== Great Britain ====
Great Britain represents a group of countries (Wales, Scotland, England) that operate in an LME with a centralized, closed market. These countries follow a unitary system of government, whereby there is a single power dictating the operations of the country as a whole. The market system in Great Britain operates with greater state involvement and control, and the price levels of goods and services are more commonly dictated by government-imposed market tools, such as tariffs, taxes, and subsidies.

The central authority holds power in both the legislative branch and executive branch of government, allowing the central authority to impose new policies and decisions without opposition from other political parties. As a result, knowledge regimes are publicly funded and not as common as they are in LMEs with an open market. State research units are more prevalent throughout Great Britain and are embedded throughout the civil society, creating more politically tempered knowledge regimes.

=== Coordinated market economies ===
Coordinated market economies (CME) are characterized by very little state involvement with firms focused on building close relationships between individuals in managerial positions and employees. Through the strong relationships created within the firm, there is a highly decommodified environment with a strong sense of social entitlement and separation from market dependency and state participation. When firms incur a problem of any sort, they use strategic interactions to create a feasible solution. These strategic interactions incorporate employees at every level of the firm so as to ensure opinions and viewpoints from all sectors are being taken into account; this typically allows for a stronger built solution. In addition, firms use strategic interaction to determine at which point the equilibrium should be set between the firm and their consumers, which establishes the appropriate combination between how much of a product is supplied and subsequently purchased.

In a coordinated market economy, there is publicly subsidized training to support high-skilled education for greater industry-specific labour needs; this is a result of the multilateral decisions that are made through strategic interactions. Additionally, there is greater confidence instilled in potential investors through the promotion of dense networks. Through the structure of the market, there are several unions and long-term worker contracts, which ensures job security and decreases the likelihood of hostile takeovers. Due to the interaction and cooperation throughout multiple firms, there is greater society-wide success through innovative tendencies, such as the green energy industry in Germany.

CMEs operate differently depending on if a state has a closed market or an open market. In a CME with a decentralized and open market, such as Germany, there tends to be strong associational institutional arrangements, producing more consensus-oriented knowledge regimes; a CME with a centralized and closed market, such as France, many policy changes are encouraged and led by state involvement.

==== Germany ====
Germany is a country with a coordinated market economy, characterized by a decentralized government with an open market system. Firms in this economy operate through well-established networks, while developing and maintaining relationships to promote and coordinate economic activity. There is very little state-involvement throughout the market, with the emphasis and responsibility being placed on the firms and corporations to set and adjust prices accordingly. Germany follows a proportional representation electoral system, creating a stronger consensus-based environment whereby policies are formulated at the regional level of government rather than the federal level.

Through regional-based policy formulation tactics, there is a higher rate of scholarly research units affiliated with several different universities, churches, and other knowledge-producing institutions. There is also a stronger incentive for political parties to create their own party research units to be used for future elections and policy-making tactics. The knowledge regimes created throughout Germany represent the institutional tendencies that firms rely on, such as the negotiation among different political parties, problem-solving mediation, and general consensus building.

==== France ====
France is a country with a coordinated market economy, distinguished by a central government and a closed market. In France, the central government is the main actor when making economic decisions and solving financial problems; the government holds sole ownership of several of the main infrastructure sectors throughout the country, weakening state-firm relationships. With a central government, the same political party holds control of both the legislative and executive branches, resulting in much of policy making taking place at the national level.

As a result of the highly centralized state, many of the knowledge regimes throughout France emerge from state-led research units, as individuals are given very few incentives or means to create or pursue their own research units. Other knowledge regimes emerge from scholarly research units that are funded through the central government.

== Knowledge producing organizations ==
Knowledge regimes are organized in different ways depending on the type of political economy they are operating in. There are 4 common knowledge producing organizations, which correspond to either liberal market economies or coordinated market economies. These knowledge producing organizations also differentiate if a country has either a centralized or decentralized government, or if there is an open or closed market.

=== Academic-style scholarly research units ===
Academic research units are made up of academia from many institutions. The most commonly found participants in these units are students and professors, however many firms with a coordinated market economy send their employees to these research units. These units are often publicly funded through the government, although they may be privately funded as well, and tend to be both politically and ideologically impartial. Academic research units are most common in liberal market economies with a decentralized government and open market. Prior to WWII, many of these research units were privately funded through philanthropic organizations, but following WWII, many governments began providing funding for academic research units by contracting out for policy research.

=== Advocacy research units ===
Advocacy research units are created by individuals who are independently motivated through their own values and morals. These research units are privately funded through organizations that directly correlate to the topic or issue being addressed through the unit. These research units are both politically and ideologically partisan in nature, and are more focused on discrediting research that has already been done by using the media to persuade politicians to alter certain policies. Advocacy research units are most common in political economies with decentralized states and open markets, as politicians are less likely to conform to political party standards and will seek advice through external resources.

=== Party research units ===
Party research units are independently funded research units on behalf of a specific political party. These units are both politically and ideologically biased towards the values of a political party, composed of individuals who conduct research on behalf of the leaders. Political leaders will use the research from these units to pursue designated policy goals that will generate as much public approval and support as possible. These research units are most common in economies that operate through highly decentralized governments with several different political parties running for office during an election.

=== State research units ===
State-led research units are the only form of research unit that does not directly involve the participation of the civil society when conducting research. These units are closely affiliated with specific government departments and ministries that conduct research on a very specific matter that is then reported back to the central authority. These research units operate in economies with centralized and closed markets and are publicly funded through the central government.
