= Giorgos Kallis =

Greek economist (born 1972)

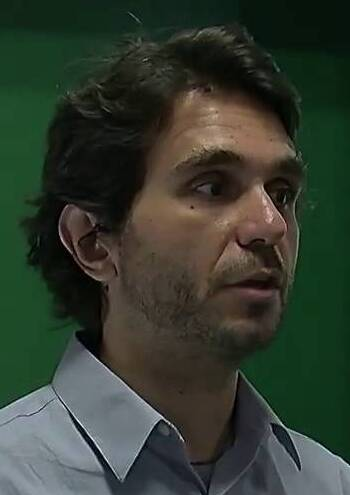
- Giorgos Kallis, in 2019
- Born: September 8, 1972 (age 54); Athens, Greece

Academic background
- Education: Imperial College London

Academic work
- Institutions: Autonomous University of Barcelona

Giorgos Kallis (born 8 September 1972) is an ecological economist from Greece. He is an ICREA Research Professor at ICTA - Universitat Autònoma de Barcelona, where he teaches political ecology. He is one of the principal advocates of the theory of degrowth and post-growth.

== Early life and education ==
Kallis was born and raised in Athens, son of medical doctors Vassilis and Maria Kallis. His mother was a political activist, imprisoned during Greece's Military Junta, later a founding member of the Greek Green Party, president of the International Rehabilitation Council for Torture Victims, and a candidate in Greek and European parliament elections.

Kallis earned a Bachelors in Chemistry with First Class Honours from Imperial College in London, where he continued to complete a master's degree in Environmental Engineering. After a period at the European Parliament working at the Science and Technological Options Assessment Unit for the preparation of the EU Water Framework Directive, he completed a PhD at the Department of Environmental Studies at the University of the Aegean in 2003. From 2005 to 2008 he was a Marie Curie post doc fellow at the Energy and Resources Group at UC Berkeley. He has also a Masters in Economics (2012) from the Barcelona Graduate School in Economics.

== Career ==
Kallis became an ICREA Researcher in 2008 and since 2011 is a tenured ICREA Professor. In 2015-16 he was a Leverhulme visiting professor at the Department of Development Studies of SOAS at the University of London.

His early work during his PhD and post-doc years focused on the political ecology of water, and the ways social and power struggles shape water development and urbanization. He has published research on EU water policy and regulation, the history of water in Athens, conflicts in California's Bay-Delta, and climate change and water security.

While a post-doc at Berkeley, he worked with economist Richard Norgaard, developing the theory of coevolution. Coevolution refers to change through mutual feedbacks and selection between social, environmental and economic systems. The theory of coevolution was first proposed in biology, for mutual evolution between two species, and expanded later into gene-culture coevolution. Norgaard introduced coevolution to ecological economics, explaining how pests coevolved with pesticide technologies and the institutions that regulated them. Together with Kallis they applied coevolution to the study of water development and urbanization, and the coevolution of rural communities with their ecosystems.

While in Barcelona Kallis came in contact with the idea of degrowth, being one of the organizers of the 2nd International Conference on Degrowth in Barcelona in 2010, and a founding member of Research & Degrowth – Barcelona, a think-tank disseminating research on limits to growth. In Barcelona he collaborates with economic historian Joan Martinez-Alier, with whom they set up the European Network for Political Ecology, a training initiative for graduate researchers in the study of environmental conflicts. In 2018, Research & Degrowth together with ICTA launched a Masters program in Political Ecology, Degrowth and Environmental Justice in which Kallis teaches economics.

Kallis has defined degrowth as a process of political and social transformation that reduces a society's energy and resource use while improving the quality of life. He is quoted by The New York Times as questioning that a global economy powered by solar and renewable energies can sustain historical rates of economic growth, arguing instead that combatting climate change requires 'managing without growth'.

Kallis has written for The Guardian, the New Internationalist, HuffPost-Spain, and La Vanguardia. The volume on degrowth he co-edited with Giacomo D'Alisa and Federico Demaria, is the most cited book on degrowth in English, and has been translated into ten languages. In 2018, Kallis published a new book on degrowth with Agenda Publishing, while Polity Press has announced a forthcoming book of his on 'the case for degrowth' for 2020.

In his recent research, published by Stanford University Press as 'Limits. Why Malthus was wrong and why environmentalists should care', Kallis makes a case in defense of limits, taking issue with the fantasy of modern societies with limitless expansion. A core distinction he makes is between self-limitation, an idea he gets from Cornelius Castoriadis, and which refers to limits that we desire and we want to put upon ourselves in order to live a meaningful life, and limits as a natural–and undesirable–property of the environment or of our bodies, that impose on us scarcity. Kallis discards the notion of limits as scarcity, and makes a case for self-limitation–individual and collective–as freedom. His book also argues that unlike how he is remembered, Malthus was not an advocate of limits, but of limitless growth.

== Selected publications ==
Books

- Kallis, G. 2019. Limits. Why Malthus was wrong and why environmentalists should care. Palo Alto: Stanford University Press.
- Kallis, G. 2018. Degrowth. The Economy | Key Ideas, Newcastle upon Tyne: Agenda Publishing.
- Kallis, G. 2017. In defense of degrowth. Self-published at Brussels: Uneven Earth publishers (ebook available at indefenseofdegrowth.com).
- D’Alisa, G. Demaria, F. and Kallis, G. (eds), 2014. Degrowth. A vocabulary for a new paradigm, Routledge-Earthscan. (translated to French, German, Spanish, Catalan, Brazilian Portuguese, Greek, Dutch, Croatian, Korean).

Academic Articles

- Hickel, J., Kallis, G., Jackson, T., O’Neill, D.W., Schor, J.B., Steinberger, J.K., Victor, P.A., and Ürge-Vorsatz, D., 2022. "Degrowth can work — here’s how science can help". Nature, 612, 400-403. doi:10.1038/d41586-022-04412-x
- Hickel, J. and Kallis, G. 2019. Is Green growth possible? New Political Economy, in press.
- Kallis, G., Kostakis, V., Lange, S., Muraca, B., Paulson, S. and Schmelzer, M., 2018. Research on Degrowth. Annual Review of Environment and Resources
- Kallis, G., 2018. Socialism Without Growth. Capitalism Nature Socialism
- Kallis, G., 2017. Radical dematerialization and degrowth. Phil. Trans. R. Soc. A, 375(2095): 20160383.
- Kallis, G. and Sager, J., 2017. Oil and the economy: A systematic review of the literature for ecological economists. Ecological Economics, 131: 561-571.
- Kallis, G. and H. March, 2015. Imaginaries of Hope: the dialectical utopianism of degrowth. Annals of the Association of the American Geographers. 105 (2): 360-368
- Kallis, G. and Zografos, C., 2014. Climate change, water conflict and human security, Climatic Change, 123(1): 69-82.
- Kallis, G., Gomez, E. and C. Zografos, 2013. To value or not to value? That is not the question. Ecological Economics, 94: 97-105.
- Kallis, G., 2011. In defense of degrowth. Ecological Economics, 70: 873-880.
- Kallis, G. and R. Norgaard, 2010. Coevolutionary ecological economics. Ecological Economics, 69: 690-699.
- Kallis, G., Kiparsky, M. and R. Norgaard, 2009. Collaborative governance and adaptive management. Lessons from California's CALFED Water Program, Environmental Science and Policy, 12 (6): 631-643.
- Kallis, G., Martinez-Alier, J. and R. Norgaard, 2009. Paper assets, real debts. An ecological economic exploration of the global economic crisis. Critical Perspectives on International Business, 5 (1/2): 14-25.
- Kallis, G., 2008. Droughts. Annual Review of Environment and Resources, 33: 3.1 – 3.34.
- Kallis, G. and H.L.F de Groot, 2003. Shifting perspectives on urban water policy in Europe. European Planning Studies, 11(3): 223-228.
- Kallis, G. and D. Butler, 2001. The EU Water Framework Directive: measures and implications. Water Policy, 3(3): 125-142.
