= Rosemary Thorp =

British economist (1940–2025)

Rosemary Thorp (2 October 1940 – 8 November 2025) was a British development economist. She published widely, with a particular focus on Latin America. Thorp held emeritus positions at the Oxford Department of International Development and St. Antony's College and was a director of the University of Oxford's Latin American Centre. She was the recipient of a Leverhulme Emeritus Fellowship. Thorp died on 8 November 2025, at the age of 85.

== Selected publications ==
- Thorp, R. (1998). Progress, poverty and exclusion: an economic history of Latin America in the 20th century. Inter-American Development Bank
- Thorp, R. (1991). Economic management and economic development in Peru and Colombia. Basingstoke: Macmillan.
- Thorp, R. (Ed.). (1984). Latin America in the 1930s: the role of the periphery in world crisis. Springer. ISBN 9780333365724
- Cárdenas Enrique, José Antonio Ocampo and Rosemary Thorp (2000) An Economic History of Twentieth-Century Latin America - Macmillan/Springer
  - Vol 1: The Export Age: the Latin American Economies in the late Nineteenth and early Twentieth Centuries (co-editor with Enrique Cárdenas and José Antonio Ocampo),
  - Vol 2: Latin America in the 1930s: The Role of the Periphery in World Crisis (2nd edition) (editor),
  - Vol. 3 Industrialization and the State in Latin America: The Postwar Years (co-editor with Enrique Cárdenas and José Antonio Ocampo).
- FitzGerald, Valpy, Judith Heyer, Rosemary Thorp eds. (2011) Overcoming the Persistence of Inequality and Poverty, Springer ISBN 9780230249707
