= Journal of Political Ecology =

Academic journal

- Discipline: Political ecology
- Language: English, French, Spanish
- Edited by: Simon Batterbury, Casey Walsh

Publication details
- History: 1994–present
- Publisher: University of Arizona Library
- Frequency: Continuous
- Open access: Yes
- License: CC-BY
- Impact factor: 4.4 Scopus (2025)

Standard abbreviations
- ISO 4: J. Political Ecol.

Indexing
- ISSN: 1073-0451
- LCCN: sn93004454
- OCLC no.: 29296948

Links
- Journal homepage; Online archive

The Journal of Political Ecology is a peer-reviewed open access academic journal covering political ecology. It was established in 1994 by James B. Greenberg and Thomas K. Park (University of Arizona), to experiment with online formats and to showcase new work in the emerging field of political ecology. The current editors-in-chief are Simon Batterbury (University of Melbourne and formerly Lancaster University) and Casey Walsh (University of California, Santa Barbara). The journal is hosted at the University of Arizona library. It publishes "Eric Wolf Prize" papers submitted by early career scholars to the Society for Applied Anthropology annual meetings. The journal is a founding member of the Free Journal Network that supports and lobbies for quality open access publishing.

== Scope ==
The scope of the journal is research into the linkages between political economy and human impact on the environment, particularly where there are inequalities in access to resources, or an increase in vulnerability, as a result of resource use or assertion of political power. Articles must address some aspect of this relationship, framed in political ecology, and topics have ranged from mining and Indigenous peoples of Oceania, to drug production in Lesotho, marine protected area management in Vietnam, the sandalwood trade in East Timor, environmental pollution in post-communist countries, water consumption and management in the United States West and Mexico, and the plight of Adivasi peoples living in national parks in India. Scientific and environmental data is always related to social and political outcomes. Special issues are occasionally published, for example: Ecologies of Hope, edited by S. Ravi Rajan and Colin Duncan in 2013; Non-capitalist political ecologies, edited by Brian Burke and Boone Shear and a significant early contribution to degrowth arguments,Degrowth, Culture and Power, edited by Lisa Gezon and Susan Paulson in 2017.

The four most important research areas in the journal are 1) food, agricultural issues and land uses 2) social aspects of wildlife conservation, including the expulsion of local and Indigenous peoples 3) fishing and marine issues and 4) mining and social struggles. Since 2015, mining and conservation have been more strongly represented, but with a trend towards decolonial research, authorship, and methods.

Since 2022 Grassroots, an endeavour of Global South political ecologists, has published its own articles (some shorter and with activist content) and special sections in the journal.

== Abstracting and indexing ==
The journal is abstracted and indexed in:

- Scopus
- Emerging Sources Citation Index
- Directory of Open Access Journals
