= Geoforum =

- Discipline: Human geography
- Language: English
- Edited by: Sarah Hall, Julie MacLeavy

Publication details
- History: 1970–present
- Publisher: Elsevier
- Frequency: 10/year
- Open access: Hybrid
- Impact factor: 3.4 (2023)

Standard abbreviations
- ISO 4: Geoforum

Indexing
- ISSN: 0016-7185 (print); 1872-9398 (web)
- LCCN: 72613231
- OCLC no.: 714973982

Links
- Journal homepage; Online archive

Geoforum is a peer-reviewed academic journal of geography which focuses on social, political, economic, and environmental activities that occur around the globe within the context of geographical space and time. It was originally published by Pergamon Press and is now published by Elsevier. The editors-in-chief are Rob Fletcher (Wageningen University & Research) and Sarah Hall (University of Nottingham). According to the Journal Citation Reports, the journal has a 2023 impact factor of 3.4.
