= Back Award =

Award from the Royal Geographical Society

The Back Award, also referred to as the Back Grant, was first given by the Royal Geographical Society in 1882 for "applied or scientific geographical studies which make an outstanding contribution to the development of national or international public policy"

It is named after the notable Arctic explorer Admiral Sir George Back.

== Recipients ==
- 1882 Henry E. O'Neill, towards the purchase of instruments for explorations between Mozambique and Lake Nyasa.
- 1883 L'Abbé Émile Petitot, for his researches in the region of the great lakes of the American Arctic basin
- 1884 Emil Boss, for mountaineering in the unknown peaks of New Zealand and the Himalayas
- 1885 W. O. Hodgkinson, for three great journeys of exploration in Australia
- 1886 Sergeant David Legge Brainard, for his services rendered on the American Arctic Expedition of 1881-1884.
- 1887 Sarat Chandra Das, for his researches in Tibet
- 1888 No award
- 1889 F.C. Selous, for geographical work in his journey in Mashonaland and north of the Zambesi.
- 1890 No award
- 1891 W.J. Steines
- 1892 Revd James Sibree
- 1893 No award
- 1894 Capt. H.J. Snow, for his rectification of the map of the Kurile Islands
- 1895 Capt. C.A. Larsen, For his observations during his Antarctic voyage in 1894
- 1896 Joseph Burr Tyrrell, for his two expeditions in the Barren Grounds of North-East Canada
- 1897 Lieut. Carl Ryder, for his explorations in East Greenland in 1891 and subsequent years
- 1898 George P. Tate, for his survey work in Afghanistan, Baluchistan, especially Makran, Aden, and on the Indus
- 1899 Capt. Percy Molesworth Sykes, for his three journeys through Persia.
- 1900 Robert Edward Codrington, for his journey in the region between Lakes Nyasa and Tanganyika
- 1901 Capt. William Colbeck, for his survey work in Victoria Land and during the voyage of the Southern Cross.
- 1902 Lieut. Georg Carl Amdrup, for his two voyages of exploration to the east coast of Greenland.
- 1903 Dr. W.G. Smith, for his investigations into the geographical distribution of vegetation in Yorkshire
- 1904 Marc Aurel Stein, for his valuable geographical work in Central Asia
- 1905 Capt. Philip Maud, for valuable survey work along the Southern border of Abyssinia in 1903
- 1906 Maj Richard George Tyndall Bright, for his eight and a half years' exploring in the Sudan, Uganda, and East Africa.
- 1907 C.E. Moss, for his important researches on geographical distribution of vegetation in England
- 1908 Lieut. G.E.A. Mulock, for his survey work on the National Antarctic Expedition, and for his long continued work in preparing the six sheets of Antarctic Charts
- 1909 Rai Sahib Lal Singh, for survey work iu Central Asia under Dr. Stein.
- 1910 Hanns Vischer, for crossing the Sahara from Kukawa, near Lake Chad to Tripoli
- 1911 Dr Arthur Neve, for his study of the physical geography and glaciology of the Himalayas.
- 1912 L.A. Wallace, for his exploration of the Tanganyika plateau and the country round it.
- 1913 William Singer Barclay, for his geographical work in South America.
- 1914 Ignazio Nicolas Dracopoli, for his survey of the Sonoran Desert and his expedition to the Lorian Swamp
- 1915 C.W. Hobley, for his work in Tanganyika
- 1916 Frank Wild, for his work as a Polar explorer
- 1917 Rev Walter Weston
- 1918 Capt. Robert Abram Bartlett, for his leadership after the loss of HMCS Karluk
- 1919 Ven. Archdeacon Hudson Stuck, for the first ascent of Mount McKinley
- 1920 James M. Wordie, for Polar exploration
- 1921 Marion Newbigin
- 1922 Khan Bahadur Sher Jang
- 1923 Bolton Glanvill Corney
- 1924 M. C. Lester, for his expedition to Graham Land, 1920-22
- 1925 Capt. Joseph-Elzéar Bernier
- 1926 Khan Sahib Afraz Gul Khan
- 1927 George Binney
- 1928 Capt. Albert H. MacCarthy, for first ascent of Mount Logan, 1925
- 1929 Philips Christiaan Visser
- 1930 Mrs Gordon-Gallien
- 1931 Col. Rowe
- 1932 H. Clutterbuck
- 1933 Freya Stark
- 1934 Dr D.N. Wadia
- 1935 Wilfred Thesiger
- 1936 Mohammad Ayub Khan
- 1937 Thomas Hay
- 1938 L.R. Wager
- 1939 Lieut-Cmndr R.E.D. Ryder
- 1940 Gerald Seligman
- 1941 Alfred Stephenson
- 1942 Srgn-Cmmdr George Murray Levick
- 1942–46 Not awarded
- 1947 Lieut-Col Andrew Croft
- 1948 A.J. "Jock" Marshall
- 1949 Brian Birley Roberts
- 1950 Richard George Goodchild
- 1951 Joseph Newell Jennings
- 1952 Henry Francis Porter Herdman
- 1953 G. de Q. Robin
- 1954 Cmmdr G.S. Ritchie
- 1955 Capt. O.C.S. Robinson
- 1956 Richard Hamilton
- 1957 Dr R.J. Harrison Church
- 1958 Bertrand Imbert
- 1959 David Stratton
- 1960 A.T. Grove
- 1961 Eric H. Brown
- 1962 B.W. Sparks
- 1963 Tony John Chandler
- 1964 Dr Keith M. Clayton
- 1965 Lieut-Cmmdr J.B. Dixon
- 1966 Dr S. Evans
- 1967 Prof. Sigurður Þórarinsson, ‘for contributions to vulcanology’
- 1968 Dr John D. Woods
- 1969 A.J. Lee
- 1970 Dr Nic C Flemming
- 1971 Dr Claudio Vita-Finzi
- 1972 Dr David R. Harris
- 1973 Professor J Leonard
- 1974 Captain David William Haslam OBE RN
- 1975 Professor Harold Chillingworth Brookfield
- 1976 Dr Keith J Miller
- 1977 Professor Ronald Cooke
- 1978 Dr Andrew Warren
- 1979 Professor John B. Sissons
- 1980 Professor Kenneth Gregory
- 1981 Dr Bruce Atkinson
- 1982 Dr Edward Derbyshire
- 1983 Dr W B Whalley
- 1984 Dr John R.G. Townshend
- 1985 Dr Desmond E. Walling
- 1986 Professor John Dawson
- 1987 Dr Stan Openshaw
- 1988 Dr Denis Cosgrove
- 1989 Dr Richard Battarbee
- 1990 Mr Rex Walford
- 1991 Dr Allan Findlay
- 1992 Professor Paul Mather
- 1993 Professor Linda Newson
- 1994 Mr Michael Eden
- 1995 Lt Col J. O. M. Roberts
- 1996 Dr Rory Walsh
- 1997 Professor David N. Livingstone
- 1998 Professor Jamie Peck
- 1999 Professor Michael Batty
- 2000 Dr Susan Owens
- 2001 Professor Linda McDowell
- 2002 Professor Andrew Gillespie, ‘for contribution to research linked to public policy on the role of information technologies in supporting and encouraging local change’
- 2003 Eleanor Rawling
- 2004 Professor Rob Imrie
- 2005 Dr Andrew Brookes
- 2006 Professor Graham Haughton
- 2007 Professor Mike Bradshaw
- 2008 Professor Richard Black
- 2009 Professor Danny Dorling
- 2010 Professor Chris Hamnett
- 2011 Professor Edmund Penning-Rowsell
- 2012 Professor Simon I. Hay
- 2013 Professor Jane Wills
- 2014 Professor David Gibbs
- 2015 Professor David Martin
- 2016 Professor Colin Thorne
- 2017 Professor Harriet Bulkeley, "for contributions to the shaping of international policy on climate change"
- 2018 Professor Hester Parr, "for contributions at the interface of geographical research and policy"
- 2019 Professor Frank Tanser, "for research that has shaped national health policies in developing countries"
- 2020 Professor Andy Tatem
- 2021 Professor Terry Marsden
- 2022 Professor Fiona McConnell
- 2023 Jane Rumble OBE
- 2024 Professor Peter Hopkins

== See also ==
- List of geography awards
