= Susan Baker (disambiguation) =

Susan Baker (born 1955) is an Irish environmental scientist and professor.

Susan Baker may refer to:

- Susan Baker (virologist), American molecular virologist and professor
- Susan Pardee Baker (born 1930), American professor of health policy and management
- Susan Weddington (1951–2020), née Baker, American businesswoman and political activist

== See also ==
- Sue Baker (1947–2022), British journalist and television presenter
- Suzanne Baker (born 1939), Australian film producer, journalist, and writer
