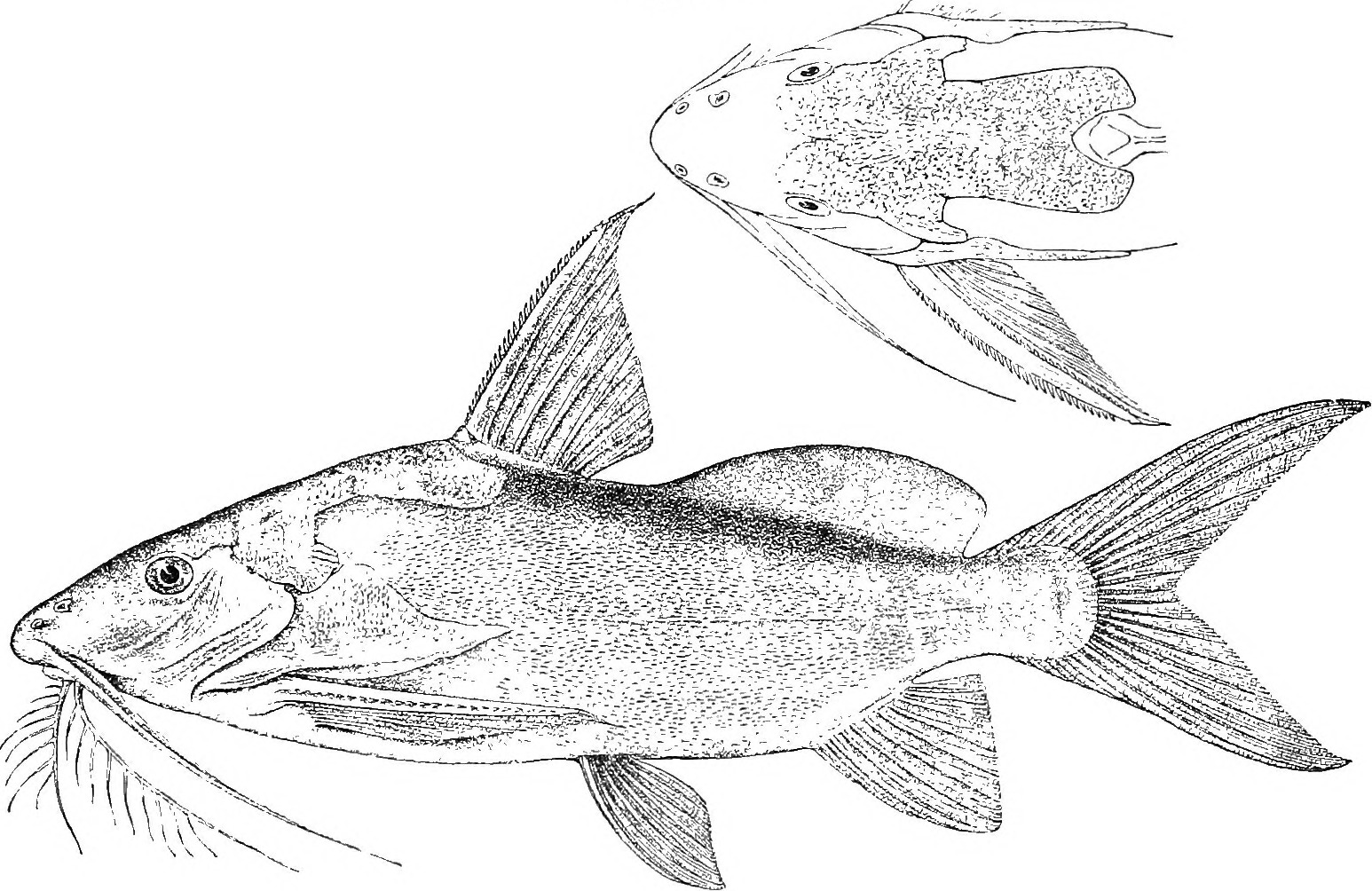

Conservation status
- Least Concern (IUCN 3.1)

Scientific classification
- Kingdom: Animalia
- Phylum: Chordata
- Class: Actinopterygii
- Order: Siluriformes
- Family: Mochokidae
- Genus: Synodontis
- Species: S. geledensis

Binomial name
- Synodontis geledensis Günther, 1896

= Synodontis geledensis =

Species of fish

Synodontis geledensis, known as the Geledi squeaker, is a species of upside-down catfish that is native to Ethiopia, Kenya and Somalia where it can be found in the Lorian Swamp, the Shebelle and Ewaso Ng'iro rivers. It was first described by German zoologist Albert Günther in 1896, from specimens obtained near Geledi, on the Shebeli River in east Africa. The species name geledensis comes from Geledi, Somalia, the location where the first specimens were first found.

== Description ==
Like all members of the genus Synodontis, S. geledensis has a strong, bony head capsule that extends back as far as the first spine of the dorsal fin. The head contains a distinct narrow, bony, external protrusion called a humeral process. The shape and size of the humeral process helps to identify the species. In S. geledensis, the humeral process is rough, much longer than it is broad, and pointed at the end.

The fish has three pairs of barbels. The maxillary barbels are on located on the upper jaw, and two pairs of mandibular barbels are on the lower jaw. The maxillary barbel is straight without any branches, with a broad membrane at the base. It extends about 1 1/4 the length of the head. The outer pair of mandibular barbels is about twice as long as the inner pair, have long, slender branches with secondary branches.

The front edges of the dorsal fins and the pectoral fins of Syntontis species are hardened into stiff spines. In S. geledensis, the spine is 4/5 as long as the head, nearly straight, serrated in the front and smooth on the back. The remaining portion of the dorsal fin is made up of seven branching rays. The spine of the pectoral fin is as long as the head, and serrated on both sides. The adipose fin is 4 times as long as it is deep. The anal fin contains four unbranched and eight branched rays, and is obtusely pointed in front. The tail, or caudal fin, is deeply forked.

All members of Syndontis have a structure called a premaxillary toothpad, which is located on the very front of the upper jaw of the mouth. This structure contains several rows of short, chisel-shaped teeth. In S. geledensis, the toothpad forms a short, broad band. On the lower jaw, or mandible, the teeth of Syndontis are attached to flexible, stalk-like structures and described as "s-shaped" or "hooked". The number of teeth on the mandible is used to differentiate between species; in S. geledensis, there are about 18 teeth on the mandible.

The color of the fish is brownish on the back and sides, and whitish on the underside.

The maximum total length of the species is 30.7 centimetres (12.1 in). Generally, females in the genus Synodontis tend to be slightly larger than males of the same age.

== Habitat and behavior ==
In the wild, the species is known in Kenya and Ethiopia, and it is thought to have a greater range. The species is harvested for human consumption. Its habitat is threatened by dam building and water depletion for irrigation. The reproductive habits of most of the species of Synodontis are not known, beyond some instances of obtaining egg counts from gravid females. Spawning likely occurs during the flooding season between July and October, and pairs swim in unison during spawning. The growth rate is rapid in the first year, then slows down as the fish age.
