= Ignazio Dracopoli =

Anglo-French cartographer and explorer

Ignazio Nicolas Dracopoli (6 December 1887 – 7 January 1923) was an Anglo-French cartographer and explorer.

Dracopoli was born at Cape d'Antibes in France. He was educated in England at Malvern College, before going up to University College, Oxford. He played minor counties cricket for Dorset in the 1906 Minor Counties Championship – making him possibly the only French county cricketer.

He travelled to Arizona in 1908, staying on the ranch of a Frenchman, before returning to England in 1909. He travelled around East Africa in 1910, which inspired him to become a scientific traveller. He joined the Royal Geographical Society shortly after, where he studied map surveying and became the first European to across the Lorian Swamp, earning him the Back Award in 1914. In the proceeding years, he mapped large parts of the British Empire, with his map of the world appearing in The Times in 1922.

He was deemed unfit for major action in the First World War due to illness sustained while travelling in Jubaland, but he was commissioned into the Royal Flying Corps, serving firstly in England before serving in Egypt. He held the rank of second lieutenant in December 1916, before being made a temporary captain in May 1917. Dracopoli was made an MBE in October 1919, for services rendered during the war. His health had never fully recovered from the illness that afflicted him during his Jubaland expedition, with him dying at Bishop's Stortford in May 1923.
