= Samburu National Reserve =

Game reserve in Kenya

- IUCN category II (national park)
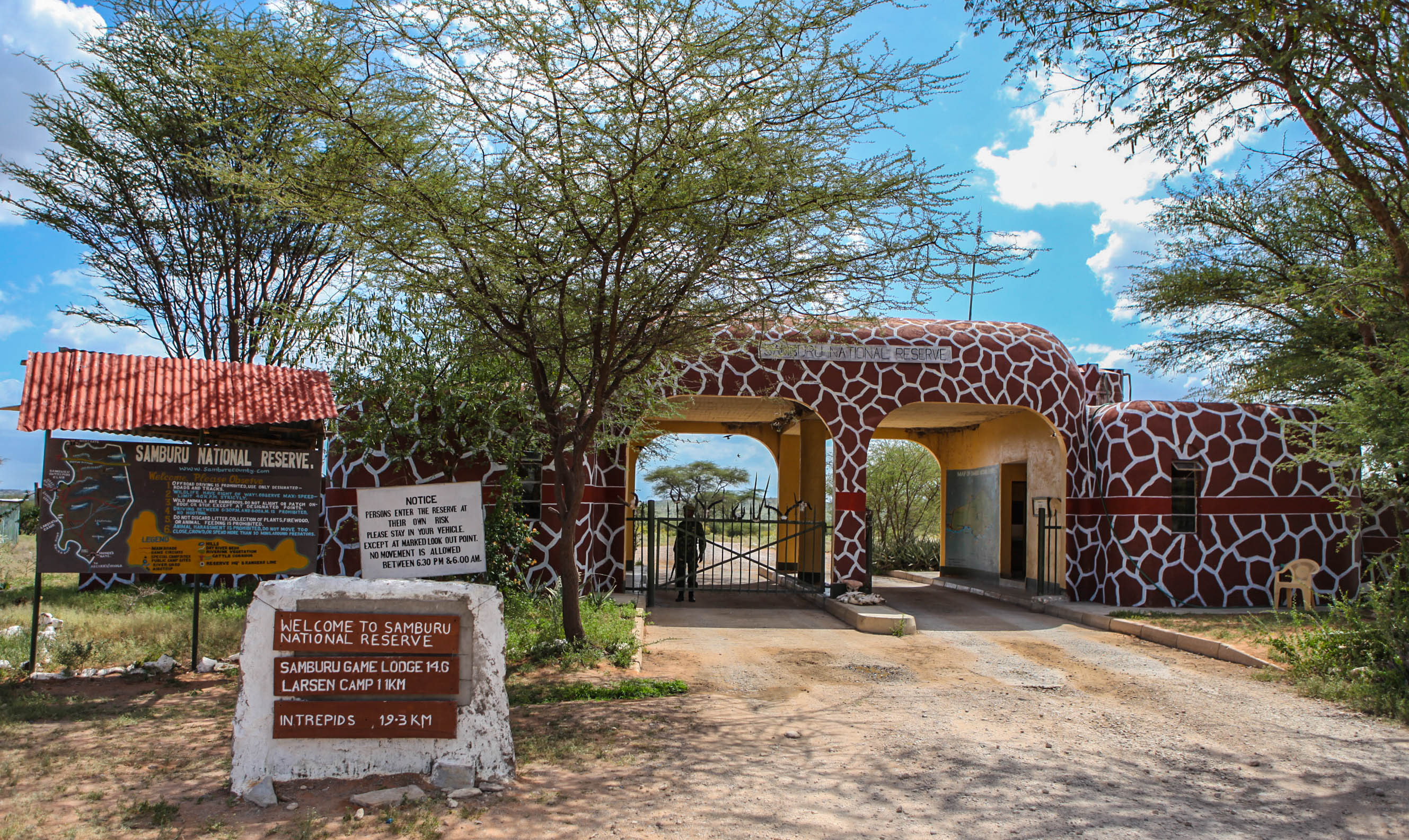
- Entrance

- Location within Kenya
- Location: Kenya, Samburu County
- Coordinates: 0°37′5″N 37°31′48″E
- Area: 165 km^{2} (64 sq mi)
- Established: 1985

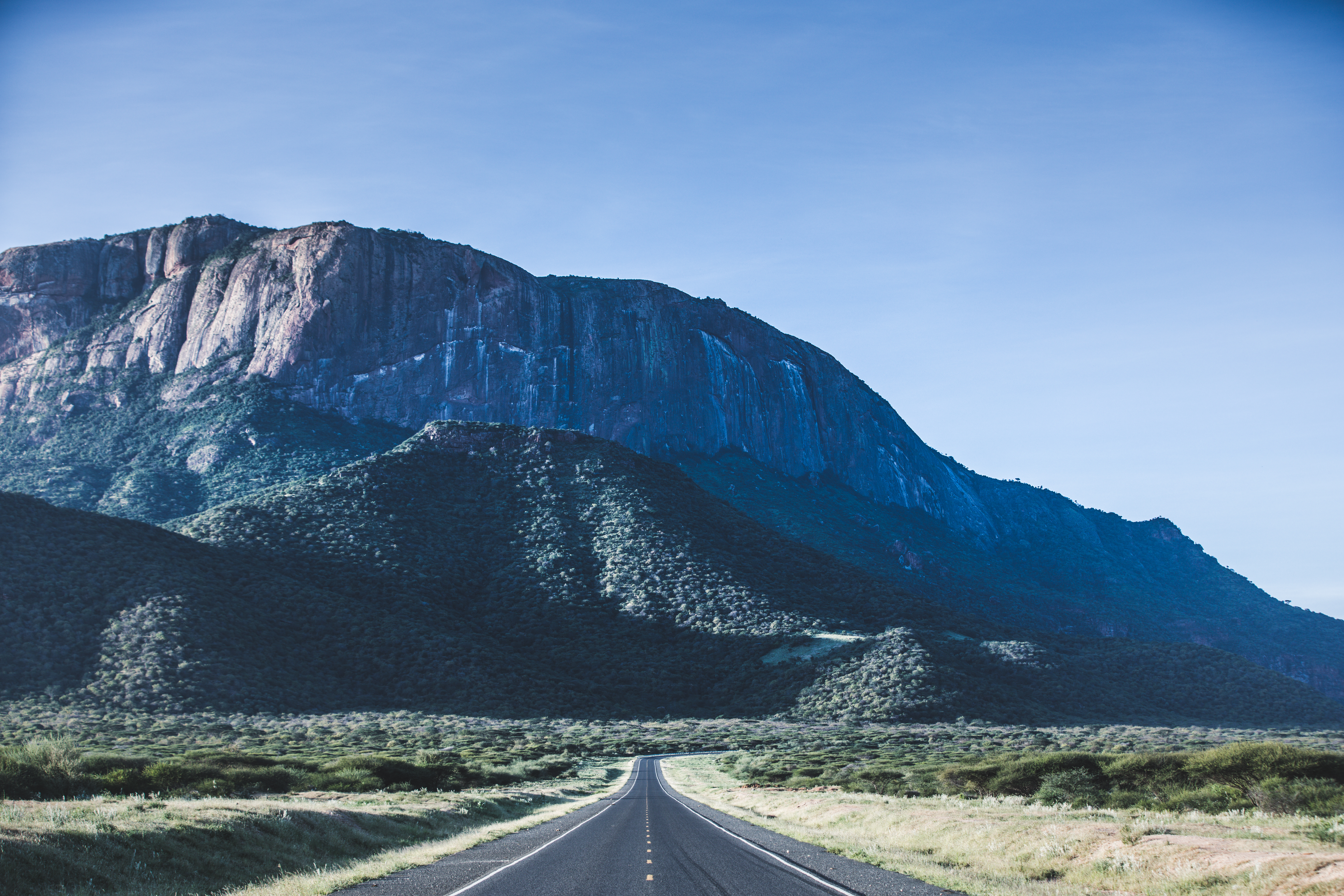
Mount Ololokwe (in the reserve)

Samburu National Reserve is a game reserve on the banks of the Ewaso Ng'iro river in Kenya. It is 165 km^{2} (64 sq mi) in size and is 350 km (220 mi) from Nairobi. It ranges in elevation from 800 to 1,230 m (2,620 to 4,040 ft). Geographically and administratively, it is part of Samburu County. It is owned and managed by the Samburu County Government.

In the middle of the reserve, the Ewaso Ng'iro flows through doum palm groves and thick riverine forests. It provides water to the wildlife in the reserve.

Samburu National Reserve was one of the two areas in which conservationists George and Joy Adamson raised Elsa the Lioness, made famous in the best-selling book and award-winning movie Born Free. The Elephant Watch Camp, of which Saba Douglas-Hamilton is director, lies within the park. Samburu National Reserve is also the home of Kamunyak, a lioness famous for adopting oryx calves.

== Habitat ==
Samburu National Reserve contains two mountains, Koitogor and Ololokwe, the Ewaso Ng'iro river (meaning "brown water") runs through the reserve and the mixture of acacia, riverine forest, thorn trees and grassland vegetation. The Ewaso Ng'iro flows from the Kenyan highlands and empties into the Lorian Swamp. The natural serenity that is evident here is due to its distance from industry and the inaccessibility the reserve had for many years.

== Wildlife ==
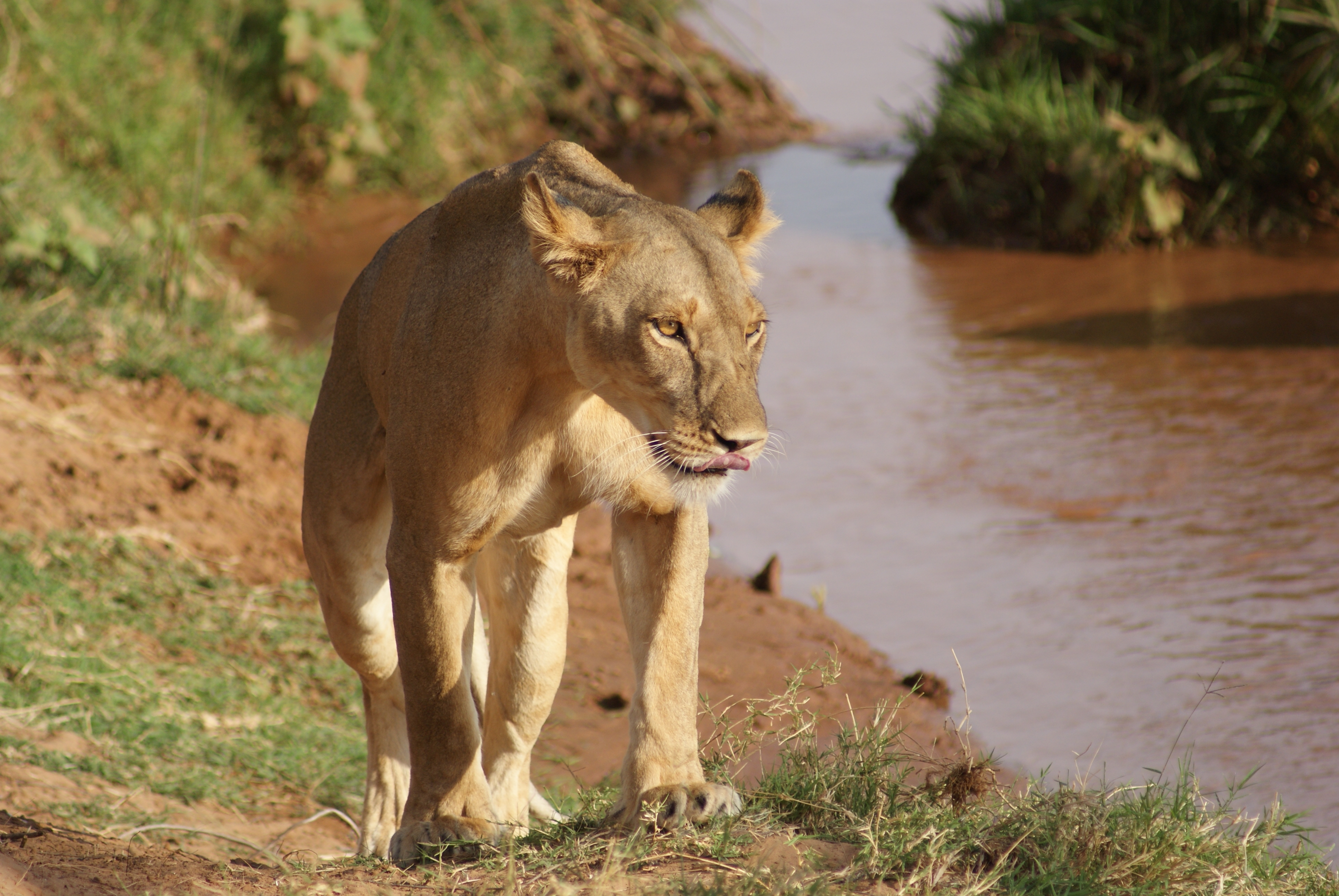
Lioness at Samburu

There is a wide variety of animal and bird life seen at Samburu National Reserve. Several large game species common to Kenya's northern plains can be found in abundance here, including the following dry-country fauna: gerenuk, Grevy's zebra, oryx and reticulated giraffe. All three big cats, the lion, cheetah and African leopard, as well as elephant, Cape buffalo and hippopotamus.

Other mammals frequently seen in the park include olive baboon, warthogs, Grant's gazelle, Kirk's dik-dik, impala, and waterbuck. A black rhinoceros population has been re-introduced into the park after an absence of 25 years after heavy poaching.

There are over 350 species of bird. These include grey-headed kingfisher, sunbirds, bee-eaters, Marabou stork, tawny eagle, Verreaux's eagle, bateleur, vulturine guineafowl, yellow-necked spurfowl, lilac-breasted roller, secretary bird, superb starling, northern red-billed hornbill, yellow-billed hornbill, and various vultures including the palm-nut vulture.

The Ewaso Ng'iro river contains large numbers of Nile crocodile basks.

From 2005, the protected area is considered part of a Lion Conservation Unit.

== See also ==
- Samburu Airport
- Samburu County
- Samburu language
- Samburu people
- Ewaso Ng'iro
