= King Carl XVI Gustaf Professorship in Environmental Science =

The King Carl XVI Gustaf Professorship in Environmental Science is a selective appointment awarded by the Royal Swedish Academy of Sciences, to one or two people annually. it began in 1996. Elected Professors spend one year at a Swedish University.

== History ==
The King Carl XVI Gustaf 50th Anniversary Fund for Science, Technology and Environment was founded in 1996 to celebrate the Swedish King's 50th birthday. The four original founders were the Royal Swedish Academy of Sciences (KVA), the Royal Swedish Academy of Engineering Sciences (IVA), the Royal Swedish Academy of Agricultural Sciences (KSLA) and the Confederation of Swedish Enterprise (Svenskt Näringsliv, then Sveriges Industriförbund). The purpose was to promote research, technological development and enterprise that would contribute to the sustainable use of natural resources and the maintenance of biodiversity. The governing body awards grants to 15–20 young researchers annually, but also, The Foundation for Strategic Environmental Research, MISTRA, and the Swedish Foundation for International Cooperation in Research and Higher Education, STINT, decided to fund one international guest professor per year for five years. This programme was prolonged for another five years and has subsequently received financial support directly from the King Carl XV I Gustaf 50th Anniversary Fund.

The Royal Guest Professorship promotes research across the broad spectrum of the environmental sciences, in both their social and their natural-scientific aspects. Its purpose is to create links between Swedish centres of higher learning and distinguished foreign researchers able to contribute to the renewal of Swedish environmental sciences. Nominations to the Royal Guest Professorship can be made annually by Swedish universities. Each university may nominate two candidates each year. The holder is appointed by the governing body of the 50th Anniversary Fund for one year residence in Sweden, by a working committee with external experts.

== Recipients ==
- 1997 Professor Paul Alan Cox, Institute for Ethnomedicine, USA (awarded 1996)
- 1998 Professor Garry Brewer, Yale School of Management
- 1999 Emeritus Professor Robert Charlson, University of Washington
- 2000 Emeritus Professor Andrew Warren, UCL
- 2001 Emeritus Professor Roland W. Scholz, ETH, Zürich
- 2002 Emeritus Professor Colin Fudge, University of Bristol, now at RMIT University
- 2003 Professor Susan Baker, Cardiff University
- 2004 Professor Robert Ayres, INSEAD
- 2005 Professor Lesley Head, University of Wollongong, now University of Melbourne
- 2006 Professor Emeritus Keith Beven, Lancaster University
- 2007 Professor Jason Shogren, University of Wyoming
- 2008 Emeritus Professor Susan Owens, University of Cambridge
- 2009 Professor Markku Kulmala, University of Helsinki
- 2010
- 2011 Professor Shinya Sugita, Tallinn University
- 2012 Professor Nancy Langston, Michigan Technological University
- 2013 Professor Harriet Bulkeley, Durham University
- 2014 Professor Raymond T. Pierrehumbert, University of Oxford and Dr. Walker O. Smith, Virginia Institute of Marine Sciences
- 2015 Professor Chris Evans - UK Centre for Ecology and Hydrology at the University of Bangor
- 2016/17 Professor Stephen M. Redpath, University of Aberdeen
- 2017/18 Professor John Anderson, Loughborough University
- 2018/19 Derek Muir, senior research scientist, Environment and Climate Change Canada, adjunct professor University of Toronto Scarborough, University of Guelph and Jinan University
- 2019/20 Professor Paul Anastas, Yale University
- 2020/21 Professor Scott Edwards, Harvard University
- 2021/22 Professor André M. de Roos, University of Amsterdam
- 2022/23 Professor Keith Paustian, Colorado State University
- 2023/24 Professor Liane Rossi, University of São Paulo
- 2024/25 Professor Amit Rawal, Indian Institute Of Technology Delhi
