= Sicele O'Brien =

Irish pioneering pilot

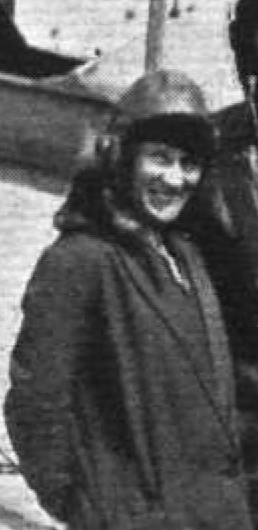
- Born: Sicele Julia Mary Annette O'Brien; 1 April 1887; London, England
- Died: 18 June 1931 (age 44); Hatfield, Hertfordshire
- Known for: Pioneering Irish pilot

Sicele O'Brien (1 April 1887 – 18 June 1931) was one of Ireland's pioneering pilots. She was one of three women who raced and set records in Europe and Africa in the 1920s. She was the second woman in Britain or Ireland to get a commercial pilots licence. She was the first woman in Britain or Ireland to run an air taxi service.

== Early life ==
Born in London as Sicele Julia Mary Annette O'Brien to Sir Timothy Carew O'Brien, 3rd Baronet and Gundrede Annette Teresa de Trafford, daughter of Sir Humphrey de Trafford, 2nd Baronet of Lancashire. She had two brothers and seven sisters. Her father was an England and Ireland cricket captain and Deputy Lieutenant as well as Justice of the Peace for County Cork.

O'Brien grew up in Dublin, London and County Cork. One of the family homes, Lohort Castle, Mallow, was burned in 1921. O'Brien was living there in the census in 1911. O'Brien was initially well known as a hunter and tennis player.

== World War One ==
O'Brien served as a First Aid Nursing Yeomanry driver in the Western theatre of war between May 1917 and April 1919 and received a British War Medal and Victory Medal. Her father also served and her older brother Timothy was killed in action in Flanders in 1916.

== Flying ==
O'Brien was a member of the London Light Airplane Club. She got her commercial pilots licence in 1927 and was the second woman in Ireland and the UK to do that. She won the first women's air race – the Aerial Oaks in 1926. With Mary, Lady Heath she set the 1928 British Altitude record. In June 1928, she wrote an article on "Flying as a Career for Women" in The Women Engineer, the journal of the Women's Engineering Society.

On 20 October 1928 she lost a leg in a flying accident near Mill Hill golf course Middlesex while giving training in her de Havilland Moth. Her leg was crushed in the crash and had to be amputated her passenger Hon. Mildred Katherine Leith survived with fewer injuries and concussion. O'Brien remained passionate about aviation, writing a number of articles and organising air rallies such as the May 1929 rally in Gleneagles. She continued to fly herself using an artificial leg. She worked on behalf of the Air League of the British Empire and was one of the two founders of the Aviation Ambulance Association of England. She lived at Earls Court Road in 1931.

She was killed in 1931 when her plane crashed on takeoff at Hatfield, Hertfordshire. The plane's co-owner, the explorer Enid Gordon-Gallien, was in the plane and also died in the crash. O'Brien left an estate worth just over £538.
