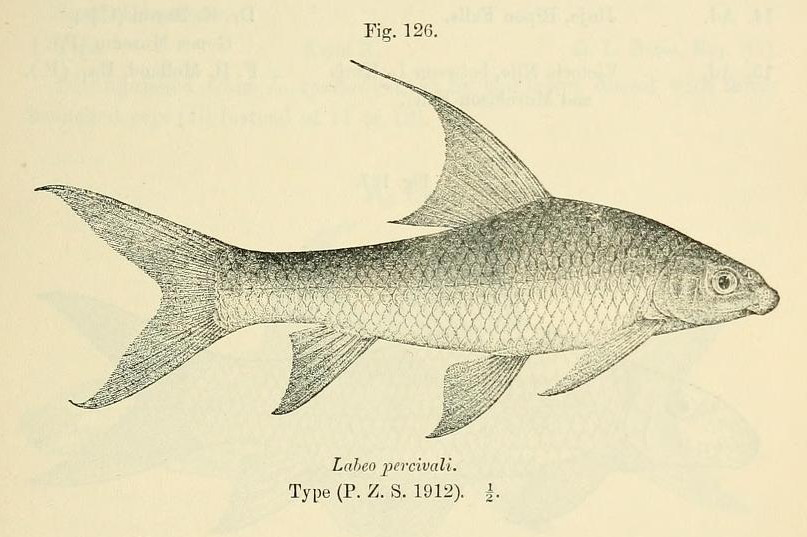

Conservation status
- Least Concern (IUCN 3.1)

Scientific classification
- Kingdom: Animalia
- Phylum: Chordata
- Class: Actinopterygii
- Order: Cypriniformes
- Family: Cyprinidae
- Subfamily: Labeoninae
- Genus: Labeo
- Species: L. percivali

Binomial name
- Labeo percivali Boulenger, 1912

= Ewaso Nyiro labeo =

Species of fish

The Ewaso Nyiro labeo (Labeo percivali) is an African species of freshwater fish in the family Cyprinidae.

Its natural habitat is rivers, and it is found only in Kenya, where its namesake river flows.

It was formerly classified as a Vulnerable species by the IUCN, but is now Least Concern.
