= Lesley Head =

Australian geographer researching human-environment relations

Lesley Head FASSA FAHA
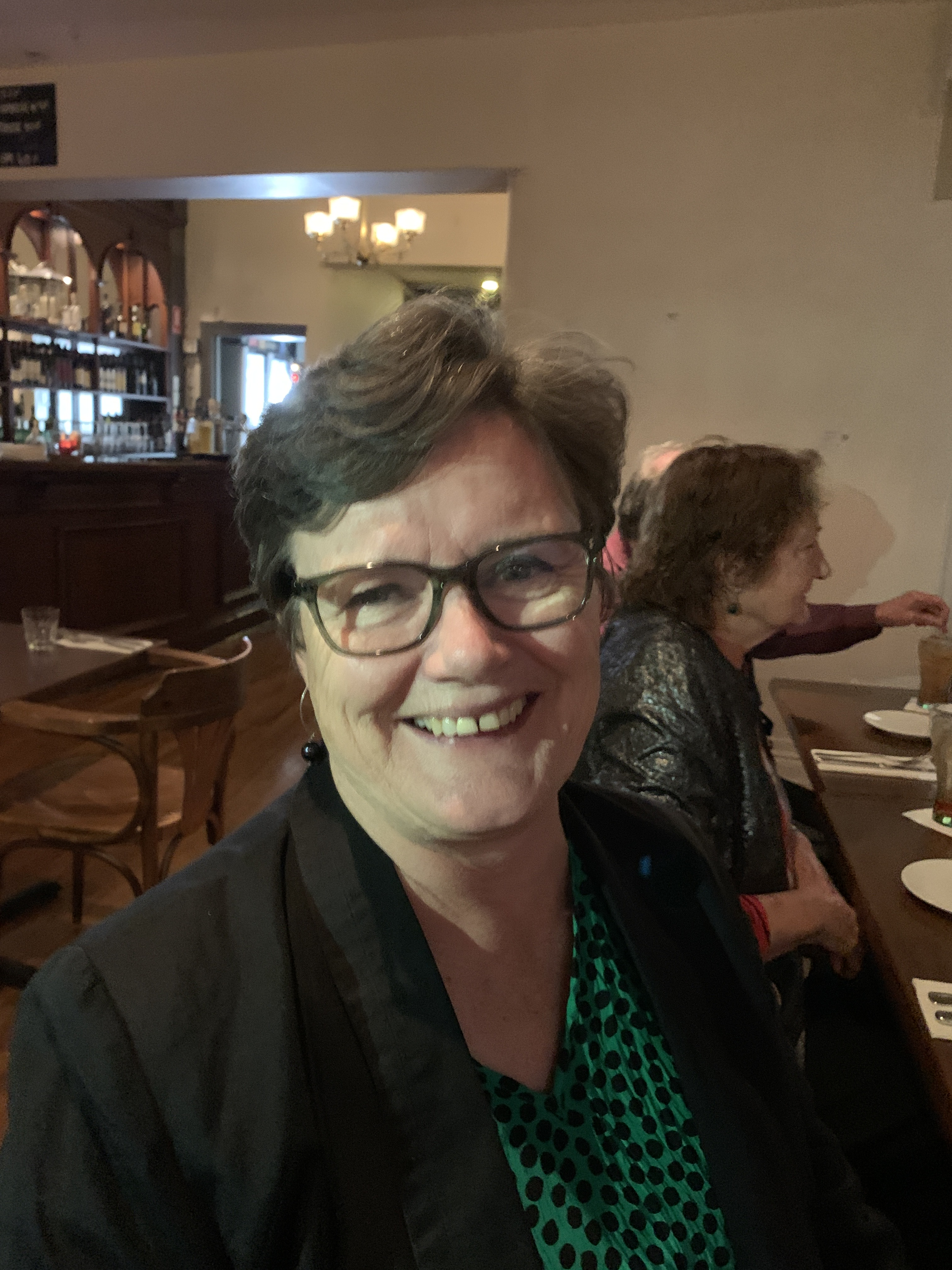
- Emeritus Professor Lesley Head, delivering the Thomson Oration, Royal Geographical Society of Queensland, Spring Hill, 2 May 2023
- Education: Monash University
- Awards: Australian Laureate Fellowship (2010)
- Scientific career
- Fields: Sustainability, Archaeology, Geography
- Workplaces: University of Melbourne; University of Wollongong; University of Gothenburg (2012–2014); Kristianstad University (2005–2006)
- Website: www.lesleyhead.com

Lesley Head FASSA FAHA is an Australian geographer specialising in human-environment relations. She is active in geographical debates about the relationship between humans and nature, using concepts and analytical methods from physical geography, archaeology and cultural geography. She retired from the University of Melbourne in 2021.

== Biography ==
Head grew up in the suburbs of Melbourne, Australia and has 3 siblings. She completed her doctoral degree at Monash University in Melbourne. She was in the Victorian public service for two years, then became a tutor at Monash, then was offered a lectureship at the University of Wollongong.

She became a professor of geography at the University of Wollongong and spent 28 years there, also serving as department head and directing the Australian Centre for Cultural Environmental Research (AUSCCER).

She has also worked in Sweden, as King Carl XVI Gustaf Visiting professor of Environmental Sciences at Hogskölan Kristianstad (Kristianstad University), from 2005 to 2006.

In 2016 she moved to Melbourne to chair the School of Geography at the University of Melbourne, with the title of Redmond Barry Distinguished Professor. She retired and became Professorial Fellow in 2021 when the school was disbanded and merged.

She is a former president of the Institute of Australian Geographers and has chaired the National Committee for Geography of the Australian Academy of Science. In 2020 she was elected president of the Australian Academy of the Humanities.

== Expertise ==
Head began her research career using palaeoecology and archaeology to study long term changes in the Australian landscape, then becoming more interested in human-environment relations and moving to research Aboriginal land use, ethnobotany and fire.

More recently, she has focused on relationships between humans and plants, such as backyard gardens, and issues of sustainability and climate change.

She has been a supporter and mentor of women in academia.

== Awards and honors ==
- J P Thomson Medal, Royal Geographical Society of Queensland
- Redmond Barry Distinguished Professor, University of Melbourne (2016–2021)
- Vega medal, Swedish Society for Anthropology and Geography (2015)
- Australian Research Council Laureate Fellow.(2010–2014)
- Fellow, Academy of the Social Sciences in Australia (2011).
- King Carl XVI Gustaf Visiting professor of Environmental Sciences (2005–2006)
- Fellow of the Australian Academy of the Humanities (2004)

== Publications (books) ==
- Head, L. 2025. Beyond Green: The social life of Australian nature. Melbourne University Publishing. ISBN 9780522880632
- Cumpston, Z., Fletcher, M. S. & Head, L. 2022. Plants: Past, Present and Future. Thames & Hudson Australia. ISBN 9781760761875
- Head, L., Saltzman, K., Setten, G. and Stenseke, M. (eds). 2017. Nature, Temporality and Environmental Management: Scandinavian and Australian perspectives on people and landscapes. London and New York: Routledge.
- Head, L. 2016. Hope and Grief in the Anthropocene: Re-conceptualising human–nature relations. London and New York: Routledge. ISBN 9781138826441
- Head, L., Atchison, J., Buckingham, K. and Phillips, C. (eds). 2016. Vegetal Politics: Belonging, practices and places. London and New York: Routledge.
- Gibson, C., Farbotko, C., Gill, N., Head, L. and Waitt, G. 2013. Household Sustainability: Challenges and Dilemmas in Everyday Life. Cheltenham: Edward Elgar.
- Head, L., Atchison, J. and Gates, A. 2012. Ingrained: A human bio-geography of wheat. Ashgate. ISBN 9781409437871
- Head, L. and Muir, P. 2007. Backyard. Nature and Culture in Suburban Australia. Wollongong: University of Wollongong Press, Halstead Press.
- Head, L. 2000. Cultural Landscapes and Environmental Change. London: Arnold.ISBN 978-0-340-73113-0
- Head, L. 2000. Second Nature. The history and implications of Australia as Aboriginal landscape. New York: Syracuse University Press.
