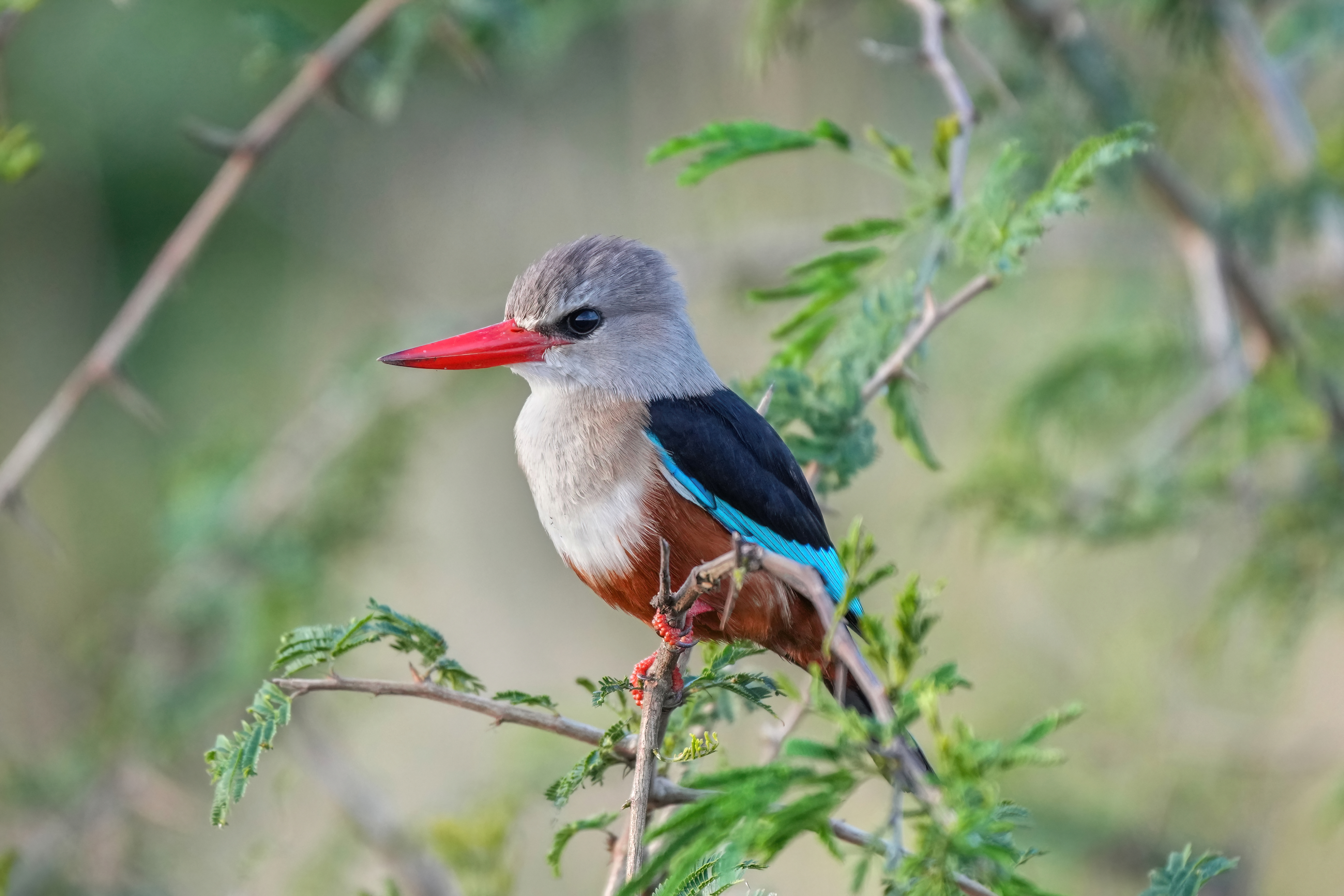

Conservation status
- Least Concern (IUCN 3.1)

Scientific classification
- Kingdom: Animalia
- Phylum: Chordata
- Class: Aves
- Order: Coraciiformes
- Family: Alcedinidae
- Subfamily: Halcyoninae
- Genus: Halcyon
- Species: H. leucocephala

Binomial name
- Halcyon leucocephala (Statius Müller, 1776)

Audio
- Calls recorded in the Samburu; National Reserve, Kenya

= Grey-headed kingfisher =

Species of bird

The grey-headed kingfisher (Halcyon leucocephala) is a species of bird in the kingfisher family, Alcedinidae. It is found across large parts of Africa and southern Arabia, from Mauritania through Senegal and the Gambia, east to Ethiopia, Somalia, Yemen, Oman and Saudi Arabia, and south all the way through to South Africa. It is also found in islands off the African coast such as the Cape Verde islands and Zanzibar.

== Taxonomy ==
The first formal description of the grey-headed kingfisher was by the German zoologist Philipp Ludwig Statius Müller in 1776. He coined the binomial name Alcedo leucocephala. The current genus Halcyon was introduced by the English naturalist and artist William Swainson in 1821. The name of the genus is from the classical Greek alkuōn, a mythical bird, generally associated with the kingfisher. The specific epithet leucocephala is from the classical Greek leukos meaning "white" and -kephalos for "-headed".

Five subspecies are recognised:

- H. l. acteon (Lesson, R, 1830) – Cape Verde Islands
- H. l. leucocephala (Statius Müller, PL, 1776) – Senegal and Gambia to northwest Somalia, north Tanzania and north DR Congo
- H. l. semicaerulea (Gmelin, JF, 1788) – south Arabian Peninsula
- H. l. hyacinthina Reichenow, 1900 – southeast Somalia to Tanzania
- H. l. pallidiventris Cabanis, 1880 – south DR Congo to northwest Tanzania and south to north South Africa

== Description ==
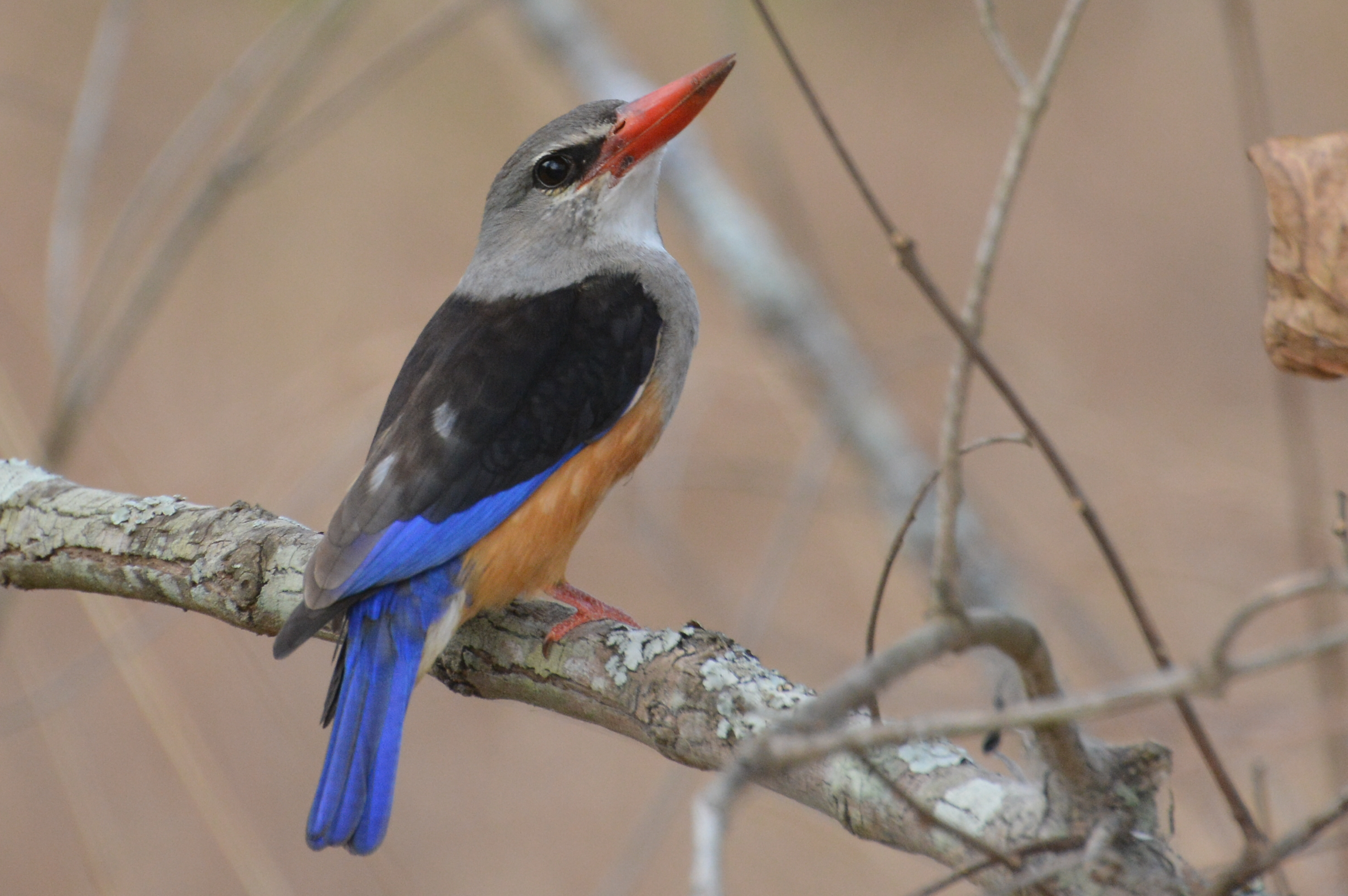
Grey-headed kingfisher, in Akagera National Park, Rwanda

The sexes are similar. The adult of the nominate race H. l. leucocephala has a pale grey head, black mantle and back, bright blue rump, wings and tail, and chestnut underparts. Subspecies H. l. pallidiventris has a darker grey head and paler chestnut underparts but is otherwise similar. The beak is long, red and sharp. This bird grows to an average length of 21 cm (8.3 in). The song is a succession of notes, ascending, descending and then ascending again, becoming increasingly strident. The warning call is a series of sharp notes, "tchk, tchk, tchk, tchk".

== Distribution and habitat ==
The grey-headed kingfisher is found in tropical and semi-tropical Africa and the Arabian Peninsula. Its range includes Angola, Benin, Botswana, Burkina Faso, Burundi, Cameroon, Cape Verde, Central African Republic, Chad, Congo, Democratic Republic of Congo, Djibouti, Eritrea, Eswatini, Ethiopia, Gabon, Gambia, Ghana, Guinea, Guinea-Bissau, Iran, Ivory Coast, Kenya, Liberia, Malawi, Mali, Mauritania, Mozambique, Namibia, Niger, Nigeria, Oman, Rwanda, Saudi Arabia, Senegal, Sierra Leone, Somalia, South Africa, South Sudan, Sudan, Tanzania, Togo, Uganda, Yemen, Zambia and Zimbabwe. Its typical habitat is woodland, scrub and cultivated areas, up to altitudes of about 2,200 m (7,200 ft).

== Ecology ==
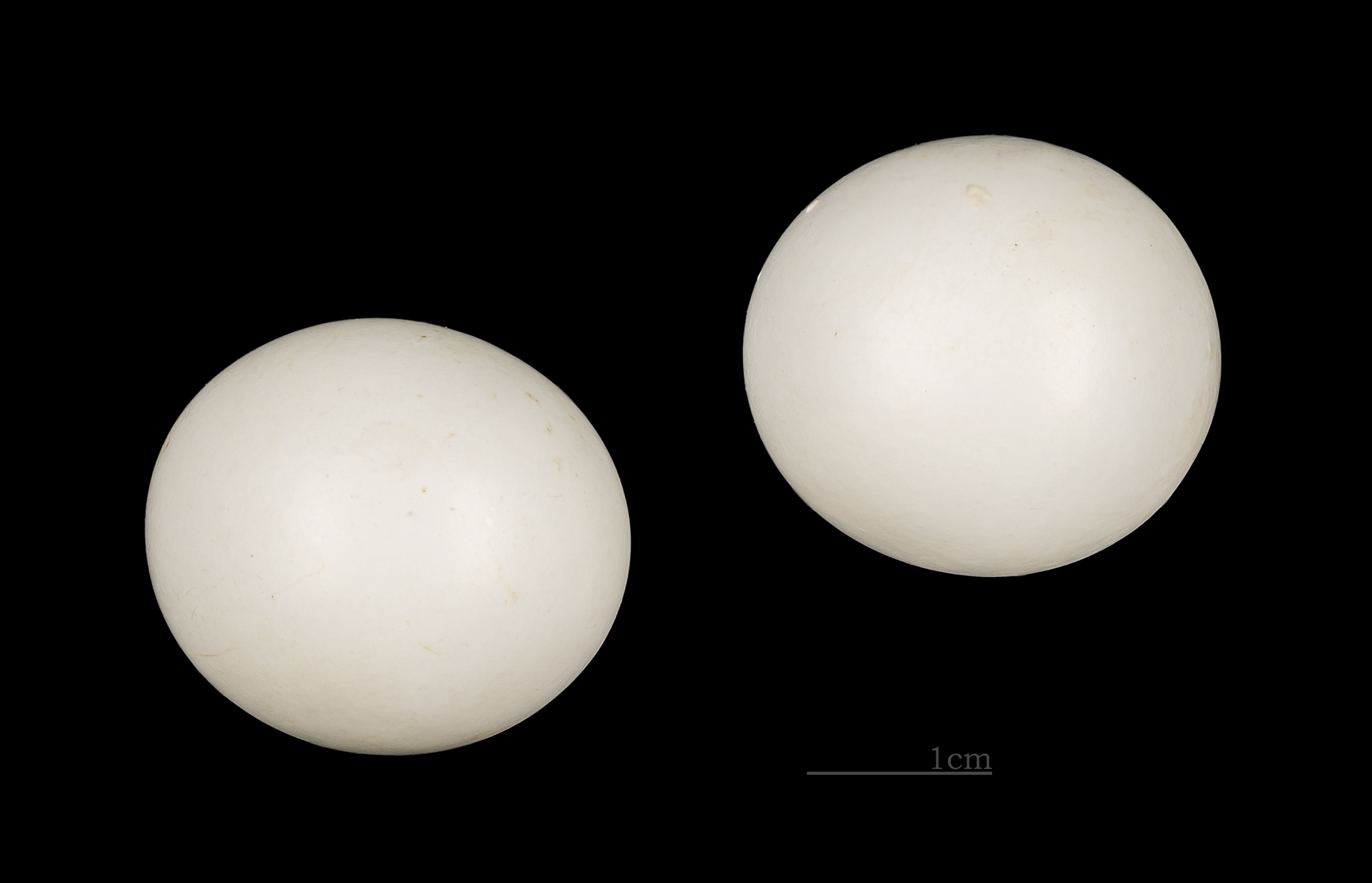
Two eggs of Halcyon leucocephala

A dry-country kingfisher of scrub and woodland, solitary or in pairs, often found near water, but unlike most kingfishers is not aquatic. Perches on a branch, unmoving for long periods while watching the ground for signs of insects or small lizards, bobbing head before diving on prey. In appearance very like the brown-hooded kingfisher but with a red rather than red and black bill and similar to the woodland kingfisher, but the woodland kingfisher lacks the chestnut belly and has greater coverage of cyan feathers on the back. Nests in holes in steep riverbanks and is aggressively protective of its nest by repeated dive-bombing of foraging monitor lizards. It is parasitised by the greater honeyguide. This species migrates at night and is often killed by flying into obstacles such as buildings, towers and powerlines.
