= Tibet Justice Center =

- TJC's logo
- Founded: 1989
- Founder: Eva Herzer
- Type: Non-profit 501(c)(3) charitable corporation
- Purpose: Human rights activism
- Location: Oakland, California
- Website: www.tibetjustice.org

Tibet Justice Center (TJC), formerly International Committee of Lawyers for Tibet (ICLT), is an American legal association founded in 1989 that advocates human rights and self-determination for the Tibetan people.

== Profile ==
The association is a non-governmental organization in Oakland, California, United States, defending human rights and self-determination for the people of Tibet. Through legal and educational activities ICLT promotes human rights, environmental protection, and peaceful resolution of the situation in Tibet.

Founded in the U.S. in 1989 as the International Committee of Lawyers for Tibet, it is historically the first and only association legal to support the cause of Tibet. The creation of the association was suggested by Michael van Walt van Praag, legal advisor to the 14th Dalai Lama, and John Ackerley, an attorney member of International Campaign for Tibet. Through meetings in Northern California held in the four main schools of law and two general conferences, fifteen lawyers and law students and a dozen of other interested people joined the new association.

== Members ==
In 1999, the association had 1,200 members, of whom one-third are lawyers.

In 2000, Robert D. Sloane, a professor at the Boston University School of Law, joined the association and became chairman of the board.

== Activities ==
=== Release of Gendun Rinchen ===
Working with Amnesty International, the TJC was able to obtain the release of Gendun Rinchen, a Tibetan guide in Lhasa jailed in 1993 for passing reports on the violation of human rights in Tibet. In March 1996, he participated with Jerry Brown, Harry Wu and Orville Schell to an event in San Francisco in favor of TJC.

=== Participation in the World UN Conference on Women in Beijing ===
A delegation of six members of the TJC, Chimi Thonden, Yoden Thonden, Tenki Tendufla, Lisa Tracy and Eva Herzer, participated in the NGO Forum at the World Conference on Women in Beijing UN in 1995. However, a 2015 documentary "Makers" does show that the organization's visa application was denied by the Chinese Government.

=== Participation in the Habitat II Conference in Istanbul UN ===
The TJC participated in the Conference Habitat II (en) of the United Nations Programme for Human Settlements in Istanbul, Turkey on 5 June 1996, Eva Herzer, then President of TJC, gave a lecture entitled The destruction of Holy Lhasa: A case study. On 10 June, the association organized a workshop on Housing Rights Violations in Tibet: a case study of the application of international law.

=== Campaign of Resolutions by cities and states in the U.S. ===
In 1999, TJC conducted a campaign to adopt resolutions by cities and states across the United States asking the Government of China to respect the human rights of Tibetans and to negotiate an acceptable solution to the issue of Tibet with Tibetan representatives, based on the will of the Tibetan people.

=== Report on the torture of children in Tibet ===
In November 1999, the TJC sent three lawyers and two psychologists interviewed 57 children in a Tibetan refugee camp in India. In June 2000, the Association published a report stating that Tibetan children older than six years are detained and tortured for political and religious offenses in China. According to refugee children in India interviewed beatings and electric shocks administered to children imprisoned for offenses ranging from writing the word independence in a school for the use of photos of the Dalai Lama's book.

=== Analysis of association of political autonomy ===
According to Mayank Chhaya, if the concept of self-governance by the autonomy has been studied for some time, it was not until about the 2000s that lawyers have seriously examined the different models that could be applied to Tibet. Eva Herzer, the founder of TJC, worked with the Tibetans in exile to consider a model of self-governance. Dagmar Bernstorff and Hubertus von Welck note that publication on the subject by TJC prompt a conference that brought together experts in international law, ministers, parliamentarians and Tibetan leaders in November 1999 in New Delhi evaluating opportunities agreement between Tibet and China.

According to Michael C. Davis, Professor of Law at the Chinese University of Hong Kong, the analysis by the association of indexes among 34 cases of territorial autonomy in the world reveals that Chinese policy of autonomy in Tibet is only nominal. A severe deficiency of real autonomy appears in the system established by the Chinese government. The TJC report highlights areas of autonomy in the world: cultural affairs, education, health and social services, taxes, economy, natural resources, environmental policies, posts and telecommunications, transport and the judicial police. These areas are covered by local autonomies in Chinese politics at Hong Kong, Macao, and that promised to Taiwan. In all these areas, the Government of the Tibet Autonomous Region is subordinate to the central government. For J. M. Mukhi, lawyer at the Supreme Court of India, the study of Eva Ezer, encyclopedic in scope, shows that there is little hope that Tibetans can benefit from self-governance without democratic change China.

=== Reports on situation for Tibetan refugees in India and Nepal ===
TJC has undertaken in-depth on-the-ground research into the situation for Tibetan refugees living in India and Nepal, looking at what their status is under national law, what rights they are allowed in practice, and the effects this has on their lives and livelihoods. "Tibet's Stateless Nationals: Tibetan Refugees in Nepal" was published in 2002. "Tibet's Stateless Nationals II: Tibetan Refugees in India" was published in 2010. And "Tibet's Stateless Nationals III: Tibetan Refugees in India Update" was published in 2016.

=== Unrepresented Diplomats Project ===
TJC worked with Unrepresented Nations and Peoples Organisation (UNPO) and Prof. Fiona McConnell of the University of Oxford on an 18-month project looking at the challenges faced when activists and advocates from unrepresented nations and peoples conduct UN advocacy. In 2015-17 we worked with 77 participants across three skills-sharing workshops (in Brussels, Geneva and Oxford), and a Training of Trainers (Geneva), and produced a survey of 65 activists worldwide, an 80-page DIY training manual on how to conduct successful UN advocacy, and a report based on the survey and 20 in-depth interviews called "Compromised Space: Bullying and Blocking at the UN Human Rights Mechanisms", published in 2018.

=== Reports to the UN ===
In 1995, the association has submitted a report to the UN on women's rights. In this report, the association said that Tibetan women are often forced to undergo abortions and sterilization operations. These women are also constrained by threats by the People's Republic of China to arrest and imprison their husbands if they do not submit to abortion and sterilization.

In 1999, the association has conducted a survey on children's right and produced a report to the UN.

In 2013, the association submitted a document for the pre-session of the Committee on the Elimination of Racial Discrimination's review of China.

=== Tibet Advocacy Coalition ===
In 2013, TJC worked with the International Tibet Network to establish the Tibet Advocacy Coalition, along with third founding member Students for a Free Tibet. In 2017, Tibetan Youth Association Europe, and Tibet Initiatives Deutschland joined as core groups. Over the past 6 years we have established a successful model to enable Tibet groups to build more coordinated, strategic advocacy at UN level. We have worked with Tibetan Center for Human Rights and Democracy, International Campaign for Tibet, Tibet Watch, Free Tibet, World Uyghur Congress, Southern Mongolian Human Rights Information Center, Initiatives for China, Human Rights in China, Human Rights Watch, FIDH, and International Service for Human rights during the mentioned projects. The Coalition has a monitoring tool for progress in Tibet called the Human Rights Action Plan - Tibet, which collects together in one place all UN resolutions, recommendations, observations and action on Tibet on key human rights issues.

Tibet Advocacy Coalition successes:

- UN Human Rights Council's second cycle Universal Periodic Review (UPR) of China saw an almost three-fold increase of direct mentions of Tibet compared to the first cycle, and saw China accept one of our key recommendations (that China agree to the visit of the UN High Commissioner to China and Tibet and Xinjiang) (October 2013)
- 25% of the UN Committee on Economic, Social and Cultural Rights’ China review was on Tibet-related issues . Most significantly, Mr. Romero spoke on Article 15 (Cultural rights) and Article 1 (Self-determination), and Mr. Schrivjer talked on Article 11 (right to an adequate standard of living) in relation to resettlement of nomadic herders and rural residents. There were three direct mentions of Tibet during the proceedings, and seven mentions of ethnic minorities - a ratio repeated in the concluding observations. (May 2014)
- The UN Special Rapporteur on Torture requested a visit to China as a result of our advocacy (October 2015)
- Our sustained advocacy around the UN Committee Against Torture Review of China led to China being pressed to address Tenzin Delek Rinpoche's case within the review - the only individual they mentioned - and led to the cases of 24 detained Tibetans being strongly raised, and very strong concluding observations relevant to Tibet (November 2015)
- High-profile media coverage (including Reuters and the New York Times) during the UN CAT Review highlighting China's use of torture and intimidation against Tibetans (November 2015 and 2016)
- Facilitation of written and oral testimony to various UN offices i.e. diplomats, permanent Mission members, Special Procedures by Golok Jigme and Nyima Lhamo, the two highest-profile Tibetan political activists recently arrived in exile (ongoing)
- Participation in invite-only residential roundtable for SR Freedom of Association and Assembly's report on "Fundamentalism and its impact on the rights to freedom of peaceful assembly and of association"
- Increased coordination on Tibet among UN diplomats, including the first joint statement on the situation in China from a group of states, led by USA, and hosting of HHDL at a side event in Geneva by US and Canadian embassies - this were not a direct result of our advocacy, but we believe our raising of Tibet more within UN provided a context for these to happen (March and June 2016)
- Engagement and submissions to UN special rapporteurs leading to two press statements, five joint communications sent to China from groups of Special Procedures, and an Opinion from the Working Group on Arbitrary Detention between October 2016 and August 2018 raising concern about:
  - Discriminatory passport practices in Tibet affecting Freedom of Movement
  - Tashi Wangchuk, language rights defender
  - Nyima Lhamo, Dolkar Lhamo and the Tibetans of Lithang and Nyakchu, in the wake of Tenzin Delek Rinpoche's death
  - Larung Gar, Yachen Gar, and mining in Amchok
- Engagement with the UN Committee on the Elimination of Racial Discrimination led to a review of China that had a strong focus on Tibetan issues (August 2018)
- UN Human Rights Council's third cycle Universal Periodic Review (UPR) of China saw an increase of direct mentions of Tibet compared to the second cycle (November 2018)

== Publications ==
- Margit Roos-Collins, The Relationship Between Environmental Management and Human Rights in Tibet: A Report Prepared for Mrs. Fatma Zohra Ksentini, Special Rapporteur, for the Study of Human Rights and the Environment Pursuant to Resolutions 1990/7 and 1990/27 of the Sub-Commission on Prevention of Discrimination and Protection of Minorities, International Committee of Lawyers for Tibet, 1992
- Andrew G. Dulaney, Resolving Claims of Self-determination: A Proposal for Integrating Principles of International Law with Specific Application to the Tibetan People, International Committee of Lawyers for Tibet, 1993
- Ken Herold, Tibet and the United States of America : an annotated chronology of relations in the 20th century, International Committee of Lawyers for Tibet, 1994
- Legal materials on Tibet, 1997.
- Violence and discrimination against Tibetan women : a report submitted by International Committee of Lawyers for Tibet, Women's Commission for Refugee Women Women and Children, Tibetan Centre for Human Rights and Democracy : to the United Nations. Committee on the Elimination of Discrimination Against Women, United Nations, 1998
- Andrew G Dulaney; Dennis M Cusack; Michael van Walt van Praag; Tibetan Parliamentary and Policy Research Centre, International Committee of Lawyers for Tibet, The case concerning Tibet : Tibet's sovereignty and the Tibetan people's right to self-determination, Tibetan Parliamentary & Policy Research Centre, 2000.
- International Committee of Lawyers for Tibet, A Generation in Peril: The Lives of Tibetan Children Under Chinese Rule : Report, The committee, 2001, ISBN 0970995008
- Eva Herzer, Tibet Justice Center, Options For Tibet's Future Political Status: Self-Governance Through An Autonomous Arrangement, eds Tibetan Parliamentary & Policy Research Centre. New Delhi, India, 2002
