= Enid Gordon-Gallien =

British adventurer and pilot

- Born: Enid Myra Merlyn Atkyns; 9 Nov 1885; Melbourne, Australia
- Died: June 18, 1931 (aged 45); Hatfield, Hertfordshire

Enid Gordon-Gallien (9 November 1885 – 18 June 1931), was a British adventurer and pilot who was awarded the Back Award in 1930 for her expedition in Tanganyika.

== Life ==
Enid Gordon-Gallien was the wife of Captain Gordon Gallien, an engineer of the Anglo-Persian Oil Company. With him she had travelled extensively. She had been involved in the First World War in both France and Egypt. Gordon-Gallien was a member of the Royal Geographical Society. She studied with Mr Reeves of the Royal Geographical Society in 1925 and in 1928 and she studied field astronomy and surveying. At that point she began investigating what expeditions she could run. The president of the society, Colonel Sir Charles Close, proposed the as then unmapped Kalambo Falls. Prior to this, Gordon-Gallien had driven her car across the desert to Baghdad as well as becoming shipwrecked on the Barrier Reef while journeying to join her husband in Borneo.

Gordon-Gallien began at Dar-es-Salaam on 15 June 1928. Other members of the party were J. W. Cornwall, a surveyor, and Colin Rose, a geologist. The expedition was written up and presented to the society in 1929. As a result of her work on the expedition, Gordon-Gallien was awarded the Back Award in 1930.

Gordon-Gallien gained her aviators certificate in August 1930 through National Flying Services at Hanworth Aerodrome. However, she was killed in a plane crash, as a passenger, when flying with her friend and co-owner of the plane, the noted pilot Sicele O'Brien on 18 June 1931.
