= Peter Hopkins (geographer) =

British academic and social geographer

- Citizenship: British
- Occupations: Social Geographer, University professor

Academic background
- Thesis: Young Muslim men in Scotland: scales of in/exclusion and the location of identity (2005)

Academic work
- Discipline: Geography
- Sub-discipline: Social geography
- Institutions: Newcastle University
- Website: ncl.ac.uk/peterhopkins

Peter Hopkins FAcSS FRSE is a British academic and social geographer. He is currently professor of social geography in the School of Geography, Politics and Sociology at Newcastle University.

== Academic career ==
Hopkins is professor of Social Geography at Newcastle University. At the university, he has held several positions including being the first University Dean of Social Justice from 20018-2021. He was also director of the ESRC doctoral training centre. Within the School of Geography, including Postgraduate Director (2008–2012), Director of Research (2017–2018), and Impact Director during the first semester of 2017–18. He also held the role of convenor for the Geographies of Social Change research cluster from 2014 to 2015. Hopkins was a distinguished international professor at Universiti Kebangsaan Malaysia from 2020-21.

Hopkins has published widely on issues related to Islamophobia, Muslim identities, and the everyday lives of minority communities in the United Kingdom. His research focuses on race, religion, migration, Anti-racism, and social justice, with particular attention to Islamophobia and intersectionality. He has also published about youth identities, men and masculinities, and the use of focus groups in research.

Hopkins is a member of the Publications Committee of the American Association of Geographers and the Nominations Committee of the Academy of Social Sciences. He is an editor of The Geographical Journal and was previously the managing editor of Gender, Place & Culture. He serves on the 2029 REF panel for Geography and Environmental Studies.

Hopkins led the first-ever public inquiry into Islamophobia through the Cross-Party Group on Tackling Islamophobia in the Scottish Parliament. The group, chaired by Anas Sarwar MSP, produced several recommendations to address Islamophobia in Scotland, including the introduction of media guidelines for journalists.

Hopkins was elected a Fellow of the Royal Society of Edinburgh in 2024 and to the Fellowship of the Academy of Social Sciences in 2018.

== Awards ==
- 2024: Back Award from the Royal Geographical Society
- 2023: Leverhulme Major Research Fellowship
- 2012: President’s Medal of the Royal Scottish Geographical Society
- 2011: Gill Memorial Award of the Royal Geographical Society

== Selected publications ==
=== Books ===
- Hopkins, Peter (2025). "Everyday Islamophobia". Bristol University Press. ISBN 978-1529232677
- Tate, Simon; Hopkins, Peter (2020). "Studying Geography at University: How to Succeed in the First Year of Your New Degree". Routledge. ISBN 978-0-8153-6968-4.
- Benwell, Matthew C.; Hopkins, Peter (2017). "Children, Young People and Critical Geopolitics ". Taylor & Francis. ISBN 978-1-134-80159-6
- Gorman-Murray, A and Hopkins Peter, (2014) Masculinities and Place. Ashgate. ISBN 978-1-138-54723-0
- Hopkins, Peter (2010). "Young people, place and identity". Routledge. ISBN 978-1-136-97569-1

=== Articles ===
- Hopkins, Peter; Giazitzoglu, Andreas (2025). "Hegemonic masculinity: new spaces, practices, and relations". Progress in Human Geography. 49 (1): 84–98. doi:10.1177/03091325241307387. ISSN 0309-1325.
- Hopkins, Peter (2019). "Social geography I: Intersectionality". Progress in Human Geography. 43 (5): 937–947. doi:10.1177/0309132517743677. ISSN 0309-1325.
- Hopkins, Peter; Botterill, Katherine; Sanghera, Gurchathen; Arshad, Rowena (2017). "Encountering Misrecognition: Being Mistaken for Being Muslim". Annals of the American Association of Geographers. 107 (4): 934–948. doi:10.1080/24694452.2016.1270192. ISSN 2469-4452.
- Hopkins, Peter (2014). "Managing Strangerhood: Young Sikh Men's Strategies". Environment and Planning A: Economy and Space. 46 (7): 1572–1585. doi:10.1068/a46263. ISSN 0308-518X.
- Hopkins, Peter (2011). "Towards critical geographies of the university campus: understanding the contested experiences of Muslim students". Transactions of the Institute of British Geographers. 36 (1): 157–169. doi:10.1111/j.1475-5661.2010.00407.x. ISSN 1475-5661.
- Hopkins, Peter (2007). "Thinking Critically and Creatively about Focus Groups". Area. 39 (4): 528–535. ISSN 0004-0894.
- Hopkins, Peter (2007). "Positionalities and Knowledge: Negotiating Ethics in Practice". ACME: An International Journal for Critical Geographies. 6 (3): 386–394. doi:10.14288/acme.v6i3.787. ISSN 1492-9732
- Hopkins, Peter; Pain, Rachel (2007). "Geographies of Age: Thinking Relationally". Area. 39 (3): 287–294. .ISSN 0004-0894
- Hopkins, Peter (2006). "Youthful Muslim Masculinities: Gender and Generational Relations". Transactions of the Institute of British Geographers. 31 (3): 337–352. ISSN 0020-2754
