= Fiona McConnell =

British political geographer

Fiona McConnell is a British political geographer and professor at St Catherine's College, University of Oxford. Her research has concerned the ways in which stateless peoples, including the exiled Tibetan government, serve their constituencies. She is a board member of Tibet Justice Center and the Unrepresented Nations and Peoples Organisation.

== Career ==
McConnell earned her undergraduate degree at the University of Cambridge (Fitzwilliam College). She completed her doctorate from Queen Mary University of London and then became a researcher at Newcastle University (2010). She received a two-year Junior Research Fellowship to attend Trinity College, Cambridge (2011). In 2013, she joined the School of Geography and the Environment at St Catherine's College, Oxford University. She was the recipient of a Philip Leverhulme Prize from the Leverhulme Trust in 2019 and the Back Award from the Royal Geographical Society in 2022 for "outstanding scholarship underpinned by a commitment to shape public policy in geopolitical settings."

She serves as Director of Graduate Studies at St Catherine's School of Geography and the Environment. She is an editorial board member for several peer reviewed journals and serves on the Board of Directors of the Unrepresented Nations and Peoples Organisation based in Belgium as well as the Tibet Justice Center in California.

=== Research ===
McConnell's work examines changing political geographies, such as that of Tibet, and the resulting diplomatic role of its stateless people, particularly at the United Nations, and the ways they make their voices heard. She uses the phrase "liminal geopolitics" to describe a threshold of political subjectivity, and bringing together theories about performance, rhetoric and emotional labor, and the barriers faced by stateless actors attempting to engage in diplomacy. Working with other researchers, she has examined the notion of a right to diplomacy, diaspora diplomacy, spatial dynamics of diplomacy, digital mediation and the teaching of diplomacy.

For one project, "Postcolonial African States, 1957–1997," she participated in analyzing the geopolitical dynamics of four decades of diplomatic training of individuals tasked with representing African states that had become newly independent. The research included a focus on the networks and power relations of novice diplomats.

In collaboration with the University of Central Asia and the Independent Research Institute of Mongolia (IRIM) McConnell investigated and helped develop a framework for sustainable infrastructure development through large scale mining activities in Mongolia and Kyrgyzstan.

=== Selected works ===
- McConnell, Fiona. "Governments‐in‐exile: statehood, statelessness and the reconfiguration of territory and sovereignty." Geography Compass 3, no. 5 (2009): 1902-1919.
- McConnell, Fiona. "De facto, displaced, tacit: The sovereign articulations of the Tibetan Government-in-Exile." Political Geography 28, no. 6 (2009): 343-352.
- McConnell, Fiona. "Liminal geopolitics: The subjectivity and spatiality of diplomacy at the margins." Transactions of the Institute of British Geographers 42, no. 1 (2017): 139-152.
- McConnell, Fiona. "Possible futures for Geography and Geographers and Political Geography? A reading from the margins." GeoJournal 87, no. Suppl 3 (2022): 373-375.
