= Embedded case study =

An embedded case study is a case study containing more than one sub-unit of analysis (Yin, 2003). Similar to a case study, an embedded case study methodology provides a means of integrating quantitative and qualitative methods into a single research study (Scholz & Tietje, 2002; Yin 2003). However, the identification of sub-units allows for a more detailed level of inquiry. The embedded case study design is an empirical form of inquiry appropriate for descriptive studies, where the goal is to describe the features, context, and process of a phenomenon. Roland W. Scholz suggests that “case is faceted or embedded in a conceptual grid” which allows to identify key components of human and environmental systems (Scholz 2011, p. 25).

A case study research methodology relies on multiple sources of evidence to add breadth and depth to data collection, to assist in bringing a richness of data together in an apex of understanding through triangulation, and to contribute to the validity of the research (Yin, 2003). The unique strength of this approach is this ability to combine a variety of information sources including documentation, interviews, and artifacts (e.g., technology or tools).

"The case study is preferred in examining contemporary events, when the relevant behaviours cannot be manipulated" (Yin, 2003, p. 7). The embedded case study approach is particularly relevant to examination of an environment where the boundaries between the phenomenon of interest and context are not clearly evident.
