= Andrew Warren (geographer) =

British physical geographer (born 1937)

Andrew Warren (born 27 October 1937 in Kalimpong, North Bengal, India) is a British physical geographer. He is emeritus Professor of Geography at University College London, UK.

== Career ==
Warren was born in India to Scottish parents, grew up in India and Scotland, and attended the University of Aberdeen (1st, Geography, 1959) and the University of Cambridge (PhD, Geography, 1967). His doctoral research was on the Qoz region of Kordofan, Sudan, funded by the consultancy Huntings, with whom he had worked as a soil surveyor in Sind, West Pakistan after his undergraduate degree. He became a lecturer in geography at University College London in 1964, and became professor in 1995, retiring in 2003. He worked for short periods at Ben Gurion University of the Negev, Israel, the Sultan Qaboos University, Oman, Lund University, and the University of Nebraska–Lincoln, USA. He lives in central London and is married with two children.

== Scholarship ==
Warren's contributions are to the understanding of desert sand dunes, desertification in arid lands, and soil erosion by wind. In addition he has contributed to conservation science, editing several books on conservation issues and supervising several PhD students.

His contribution to the desertification debate has been to assert the 'social' and 'contextual' nature of desertification processes, as well as the inadequacies of monitoring techniques and broad statements about desertification in drylands up until the 1990s. This has proven controversial, but has helped shift the debate on desertification to one that recognizes dryland peoples as positive agents of change rather than destroyers of fragile ecosystems.

He studied soil erosion in several parts of Africa and the Middle East, but particularly as part of a larger project on livelihoods and environmental change in South West Niger with Adrian Chappell (Carfiff University) and Simon Batterbury (University of Melbourne). Caesium-137 techniques were used to link patterns of soil flux to changes in the livelihoods of Sahelian farming households over 30 years, showing how households with labour shortages had greater net erosion on their fields but sometimes more diversified sources of income. In Europe the EU-funded WHEELS project helped to understand the causation of wind erosion on light agricultural soils.

In the mid-2000s Warren participated in an expedition to the Bodélé Depression, northern Chad, dubbed the "dustiest place on Earth". The team established that the region contributes substantially to global atmospheric dust due to its diatomite and mega-barchan dunes. The team also argued that dust, displaced into the upper atmosphere and widely dispersed, is a major contributor to terrestrial and oceanic nutrient budgets.

== Awards ==
- 1961–1964 Hunting Group Scholarship, University of Cambridge.
- 1967–1968 American Council of Learned Societies Fellowship to University of Nebraska–Lincoln.
- 1978 Royal Geographical Society, Back Award for studies of desert landforms.
- 1994 Royal Geographical Society, Murchison Award, for contributions to tropical ecology.
- 2000 The 4th holder of the King Carl XVI Gustaf Professorship in Environmental Science from the Royal Swedish Academy of Sciences, held at University of Lund.

== Key Publications ==
=== Books and edited volumes ===
- Cooke, R.U. and Warren, A. 1973. Geomorphology in deserts. Batsford, London, 394 pp.
- Warren, A. and Goldsmith, F.B., (Eds.) 1974 Conservation in practice. John Wiley and Sons, Chichester, 375 pp.
- Warren, A. and Goldsmith, F.B., (Eds.) 1983. Conservation in perspective. John Wiley and Sons, Chichester, 474 pp.
- Warren A, Agnew C. 1988 An assessment of desertification and land degradation in arid and semi-arid areas. London: IIED 72p.
- Warren, A. and Khogali, M. 1992. Desertification and drought in the Sudano-Sahelian region 1985–1991. United Nations Sudano-Sahelian Office (UNSO), New York, 102 pp.
- Cooke, R.U., Warren, A. and Goudie, A.S. 1992. Desert geomorphology. UCL Press, London, 512 pp.
- Goldsmith, F.B. and Warren, A., Eds. 1993. Conservation in progress. Wiley, Chichester, 384 pp.
- Livingstone, I. and Warren, A. 1996. Aeolian geomorphology: an introduction. Addison-Wesley Longman, Harlow, 211 pp.
- Warren, A. and French, J.R. (Eds) 2001. Habitat Conservation: Managing the Physical Environment. John Wiley and Sons, Chichester.
- Batterbury, SPJ & A. Warren. 1999. Land Use and Land Degradation In Southwestern Niger: Change And Continuity. Final Report to the ESRC Global Environmental Change Programme. 100pp.
- Batterbury, S.P.J & A.Warren. (Eds.) 2001. The African Sahel 25 years after the Great Drought. Special Issue of Global Environmental Change. 11 (1): 1–96. (8 papers).
- Warren, A. 2013. Dunes: dynamics, morphology, history. Wiley-Blackwell. ISBN 978-1-4443-3969-7
- Livingstone, I. and Warren, A. (eds.). 2019. Aeolian geomorphology: a new introduction. Wiley-Blackwell, Chichester.

=== Articles ===
- Warren, A. 1995. Changing understandings of African pastoralism and environmental paradigms. Transactions of the Institute of British Geographers, 20 (2), 193–203.
- Warren, A., Sud, Y.C. and Rozanov, B. 1996. The future of deserts. Journal of Arid Environments, 32, 75–89.
- Wiggs, G.F.S., Livingstone, I. and Warren, A. 1996. The role of streamline curvature in sand dune dynamics: evidence from field and wind-tunnel measurements. Geomorphology, 17, 29–46.
- Chappell, A., Warren, A. Oliver, M.A. and Charlton, M. 1998. The utility of 137Cs for measuring soil redistribution rates in south-west Niger. Geoderma, 81 (3–4), 313–338.
- Warren, A. and Allison, D. 1998. The palaeoenvironmental significance of dune-size hierarchies. Paleogeography, Palaeoclimatology, Palaeoecology, 137 (3–4), 289–303.
- Chappell, A., Valentin, C., Warren, A. and d'Herbes, J-M. 1999. Testing the validity of upslope migration in banded vegetation from south-west Niger. Catena, 37: 217–229.
- Momiji H, Warren A. 2000. Relations of sand trapping efficiency and migration speed of transverse dunes to wind velocity. Earth Surface Processes and Landforms 25 (10): 1069–1084.
- Batterbury, S.P.J. & A. Warren. 2001. The African Sahel 25 years after the great drought: assessing progress and moving towards new agendas and approaches. Global Environmental Change 11(1): 1–8.
- Warren A., S.P.J. Batterbury & H. Osbahr. 2001. Soil erosion in the West African Sahel: a review and an application of a 'local political ecology' approach in South West Niger. Global Environmental Change 11(1): 79–96.
- Warren, A. 2002. Land Degradation is contextual. Land Degradation and Development. 13 (6): 449–459
- Warren A, Chappell A, Todd MC, Bristow C, Drake N, Engelstaedter S, Martins V, M'bainayel S, Washington R. 2007. Dust-raising in the dustiest place on earth. Geomorphology 92(1–2):
