= Chris Hamnett =

British geographer (born 1946)

Christopher Robert Hamnett FAcSS FRSA
- Born: October 7, 1946 (age 80); Louth, Lincolnshire
- Board member of: Menzies Australia Institute
- Spouse: Barbara Pope
- Children: 2
- Parent(s): William and Mary Hamnett
- Awards: Back Award

Academic background
- Education: University of London; University of Birmingham

Academic work
- Discipline: geography
- Sub-discipline: urban geography

Christopher Robert Hamnett (born 7 October 1946) is a British urban geographer. He is an emeritus professor in geography of King's College London, at which he taught from 1995 to 2014. He is currently a visiting professor at Renmin University of China.

== Early life and career ==
Hamnett was born on 7 October 1946 in Louth, Lincolnshire to William and Mary Hamnett. He completed a bachelor of science at the University of London in 1969 and subsequently a diploma in Urban and Regional Studies at the University of Birmingham.

He joined the Open University in 1970 as a research assistant and became a lecturer in 1974, during which he held various visiting positions at George Washington University, the Australian National University, Nuffield College, Oxford (as the Sir Norman Chester Senior Research Fellow) and the Netherlands Institute for Advanced Study. He left the Open University to join King's College London in 1995, where he is a member of the Menzies Australia Institute.

He has contributed to The Guardian, the Financial Times and The Independent, amongst other publications. He has edited multiple journals, including Area. He has been elected fellows of both the Academy of Social Sciences and Royal Society of Arts and is a recipient of the Royal Geographical Society's Back Award.

Hamnett is regarded as one of the foremost authorities on gentrification as well as social identity and wealth in the United Kingdom. In the field of gentrification studies he is one of the most highly published authors both in terms of journal articles and reference works. He has also written prominently on British housing policy, particularly housing reform.

== Selected works ==
=== Books ===
- Hamnett, Chris (1988). Cities, Housing and Profits: Flat Break-Up and the Decline of Private Renting. London: Routledge. ISBN 9780367682149.
- Feigenbaum, Harvey B.; Henig, Jeffrey R.; Hamnett, Chris (1999). Shrinking the state: the political underpinnings of privatization. Cambridge: Cambridge University Press. ISBN 978-0-521-63080-1.
- Hamnett, Chris (1999). Winners and Losers: Home Ownership in Modern Britain. London: Routledge. ISBN 9781857283341.
- Hamnett, Chris (2003). Unequal City: London in the Global Arena. London: Routledge. ISBN 9780415317313.
- Hamnett, Chris (2021). Advanced Introduction to Gentrification. Elgar Advanced Introductions series. Cheltenham: Edward Elgar Publishing. ISBN 9781839106859.
- Butler, Tim; Hamnett, Chris (2011). Ethnicity, Class and Aspiration: Remaking London's East End. Bristol: Policy Press. ISBN 9781847426505.

=== Articles ===
- Hamnett, Chris (1991). "The Blind Men and the Elephant: The Explanation of Gentrification". Transactions of the Institute of British Geographers. 16 (2): 173–189. doi:10.2307/622612. ISSN 0020-2754.
- Hamnett, Chris (2003). "Gentrification and the middle-class remaking of inner London, 1961–2001". Urban Studies. 40 (12): 2401–2426. doi:10.1080/0042098032000136138.
- Hamnett, Chris (2009). "Spatially displaced demand and the changing geography of house prices in London, 1995–2006". Housing Studies. 24 (3): 301–320. doi:10.1080/02673030902869250.
- Hamnett, Chris; Butler, Tim (2010). "The changing ethnic structure of housing tenures in London, 1991–2001". Urban Studies. 47 (1): 55–74. doi:10.1177/0042098009346869.
- Hamnett, Chris (2021). "Gentrification and the role of the professional–managerial middle class". Urban Geography. 42 (8): 1058–1060. doi:10.1080/02723638.2021.1911869.
