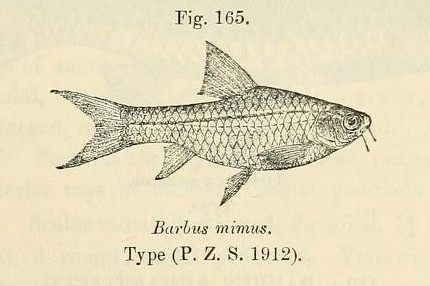

Conservation status
- Least Concern (IUCN 3.1)

Scientific classification
- Kingdom: Animalia
- Phylum: Chordata
- Class: Actinopterygii
- Order: Cypriniformes
- Family: Cyprinidae
- Subfamily: Smiliogastrinae
- Genus: Enteromius
- Species: E. mimus

Binomial name
- Enteromius mimus (Boulenger, 1912)

Synonyms
- Barbus mimus Boulenger, 1912

= Ewaso Nyiro barb =

Species of fish

The Ewaso Nyiro barb (Enteromius mimus) is a species of ray-finned fish in the family Cyprinidae.

Its natural habitat is rivers, and it is found only in Kenya, where its namesake river flows.

It is not considered a threatened species by the IUCN.
