= Richard Battarbee =

British ecologist

- Education: University College London
- Scientific career
- Fields: Geography
- Workplaces: University College London

Richard William Battarbee FRS is a British palaeoecologist, and director of the Environmental Change Research Centre, University College London.

== Works ==
- Richard W. Battarbee, Heather A. Binney (eds) Natural climate variability and global warming: a Holocene perspective, Wiley-Blackwell, 2008, ISBN 978-1-4051-5905-0
- Martin Kernan; Richard W. Battarbee; Brian R. Moss, eds. (2010). Climate Change Impacts on Freshwater Ecosystems. John Wiley and Sons. ISBN 978-1-4051-7913-3.
