= Roland W. Scholz =

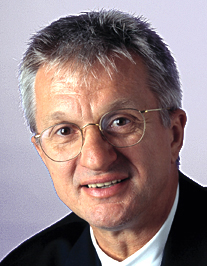
Roland Werner Scholz

Roland Werner Scholz (* 15. April 1950 in Halle (Saale)) is a German mathematician, psychologist, and Professor Emeritus of Environmental Systems Science at ETH Zurich. He famously coined the terms transdisciplinarity and societal didactics.

Roland Scholz earned his undergraduate and master's degrees in mathematics at the University of Marburg (1976), a PhD degree in social psychology (Dr. phil., 1987), and a habilitation degree (Dr. phil. habil.) in cognitive psychology. In the late 1980s, he shifted from basic research to the emerging environmental sciences. From 1993 until 2012, Dr. Scholz held the chair of Natural and Social Science Interface at the Department of Environmental System Sciences at ETH Zurich. Following his retirement in 2013, he also worked as an adjunct professor (Privatdozent) at the Department of Psychology at the University of Zurich, is affiliated as Professor Extraordinaire at the Faculty of Economic and Management Sciences, School of Public Leadership, Stellenbosch University (SA) and works as project leader at the Fraunhofer Society Project Group for Materials Recycling and Resource Strategies IWKS (Alzenau, Germany). Scholz was the fifth holder of the King Carl XVI Gustaf Professorship (2001/2002) at Chalmers University of Technology in Sweden.

He has also served as a guest professor or guest scientist at Carnegie Mellon University, Harvard University, and MIT (USA); Leuphana University of Lüneburg (Germany); the University of Graz and BOKU (University of Natural Resources and Life Sciences, Vienna) (Austria); and the University of Gothenburg (Sweden). Scholz served as a senior advisor at the Fraunhofer-Institut für Grenzflächen- und Bioverfahrenstechnik for Interfacial Engineering and Biotechnology (IGB) and is affiliated with various universities. Since 2018 he is working as scientific project leader on the project Digital Data as Subject of Transdisciplinary Processes (DiDaT) at the Institute for Advanced Sustainability Studies (Potsdam, Germany).

== Scientific contributions ==
Scholz has contributed to mathematical and psychological game theory and decision theory, environmental modeling, risk perception, and risk assessment. His basic research has been dedicated to negotiation and coalition formation, decision making under uncertainty, and stochastic thinking, and has followed the concept of bounded rationality. His experimental work has demonstrated that scales of aspirational levels constitute a proper psychological concept for modeling utility functions on the level of the individual, and that decision-making under uncertainty may be based on two complementary cognitive processes, i.e., the intuitive and analytic modes of thought. Since the early 1990s, Scholz has focused on decision and transformation processes of urban and regional systems, organizations, and policy processes.

Scholz is one of the pioneers of the theory and practice of transdisciplinary research and processes. According to his work, which manifested itself as part of the Zurich 2000 definition, transdisciplinarity is different from interdisciplinarity, since, as a core characteristic, knowledge integration and mutual learning among science and society together with co-leadership are crucial elements when striving towards socially robust orientations for sustainable development. From a methodological and didactic perspective, the embedded case study became a powerful method for supporting transdisciplinary processes. Since 1993, he has been an innovator and scientific leader of the first transdisciplinarity laboratory and initiated large-scale transdisciplinary projects on sustainable transitions of urban, agricultural, ecological, technological, economic, and political systems. He was co-leader of the Global TraPs International Fertilizer Development Center#Global Transdisciplinary Processes for Sustainable Phosphorus Management (Global TraPs) project – the first global project on sustainable resources management in regard to phosphorus – which included representatives of all key stakeholder groups of the supply–demand chain.

His current scientific work focuses on resilient coupled human–environment systems. Scholz investigates how the rationales of human and environmental systems interact and adapt. As expressed by the phrase “disciplined interdisciplinarity in transdisciplinary discourses,” he contributes to how different forms of epistemics in different domains of science and society may be interrelated.

Scholz has edited or published more than 40 books and (co-)authored more than 400 scientific papers. Most of these have contributed to environmental and sustainability sciences. However, his work has also contributed to risk and decision research, public health, and the domains of psychology, economics (sustainable finance), organizational sciences, and the didactics of mathematics.

== Publications ==
- Roland W. Scholz; Amit H. Roy; Fridolin S. Brand; Deborah T. Hellums; Andrea E. Ulrich (12 March 2014). Sustainable Phosphorus Management: A Global Transdisciplinary Roadmap. Springer Science & Business Media. ISBN 978-94-007-7250-2.
- Roland W. Scholz; Claudia R. Binder (21 July 2011). Environmental Literacy in Science and Society: From Knowledge to Decisions. Cambridge University Press. ISBN 978-0-521-18333-8.
- Roland W. Scholz; Olaf Tietje (2002). Embedded Case Study Methods: Integrating Quantitative and Qualitative Knowledge. SAGE Publications. ISBN 978-0-7619-1946-9.
- J. Thompson Klein; W. Grossenbacher-Mansuy; R. Häberli; A. Bill; R. W. Scholz; M. Welti (6 December 2012). Transdisciplinarity: Joint Problem Solving among Science, Technology, and Society: An Effective Way for Managing Complexity. Birkhäuser. ISBN 978-3-0348-8419-8.
- Rolf Biehler; Roland W. Scholz; Rudolf Sträßer; Bernard Winkelmann (11 April 2006). Didactics of Mathematics as a Scientific Discipline. Springer Science & Business Media. ISBN 978-0-306-47204-6.
- Roland W. Scholz (6 December 2012). Cognitive Strategies in Stochastic Thinking. Springer Science & Business Media. ISBN 978-94-009-3825-0.
- R.W. Scholz (1 November 1983). Decision Making under Uncertainty: Cognitive Decision Research, Social Interaction, Development and Epistemology. Elsevier. ISBN 978-0-08-086670-3.
- Roland W. Scholz (1980). Dyadische Verhandlungen: e. theoret. u. experimentelle Unters. von Vorhersagemodellen. Hain. ISBN 978-3-445-02036-9.
