= Susan Baker (virologist) =

American virologist

Susan C. Baker
- Education: Vanderbilt University (Ph.D.)
- Scientific career
- Fields: Virology, Immunology
- Workplaces: Loyola University

Susan C. Baker is an American molecular virologist and professor at Loyola University Chicago, Illinois. She teaches microbiology and immunology within the Loyola Medicine Health System. She received her Ph.D. from Vanderbilt University. Currently, she has 80 publications, dating back to 1987, within each of the following disciplines: microbiology, infectious disease, and infectious disease control to name a few. A list of her publications can be found here.

== Research focus ==
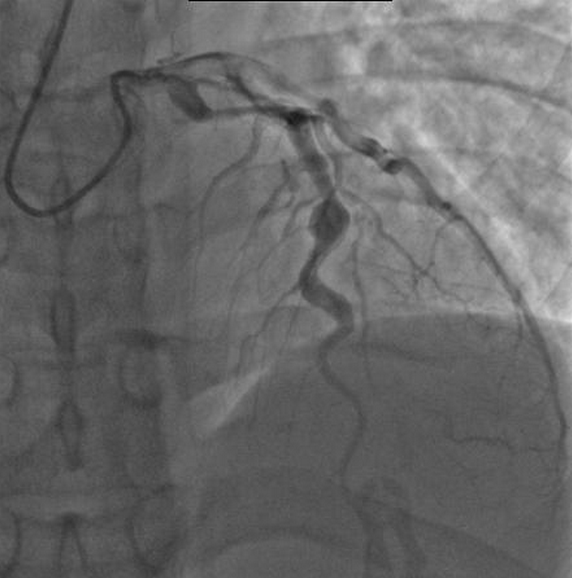
Angiogram of Kawasaki Disease.

Baker has done extensive research on many diseases, however her ongoing research revolves around Coronaviruses and Kawasaki disease and the pathogenesis of each.

Kawasaki Disease causes inflammation of arterial walls throughout the body. This disease also affects skin, mucous membranes, and the body's lymph nodes. Baker's lab is investigating the possibility of a viral causative agent for the disease. This disease mostly affects children under the age of 5. Causes remain unknown, however it is treatable within days if the symptoms are recognized early enough. If left untreated, it can lead to serious problems for the heart.

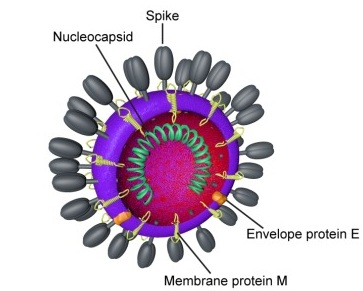
Coronavirus virion

Baker has also worked closely with coronaviruses, the causative agent of severe acute respiratory syndrome. These are viruses that affect mostly the upper respiratory and GI tract of humans and are named because of their crown-like appearance under the electron microscope. Currently her lab is using a mouse model to test the function and inhibition of certain proteases involved in coronavirus infection.

== Publications ==
Baker has many published articles, mostly concerning Coronaviruses and Kawasaki Disease. The following are her most recent publications on these topics.

- Murine coronavirus ubiquitin-like domain is important for papain-like protease stability and viral pathogenesis

In this study, the function of ubiquitin-like domains (Ubl) is studied. To find the function, structures of papain-like proteases (PLP) and domains of coronaviruses (CoVs) were studied. It was found that an adjacent Ubl domain was present in different CoV domains.

- Structural Basis for the Ubiquitin-Linkage Specificity and deISGylating Activity of SARS-CoV Papain-Like Protease

This article shows the basis of the ubiquitin chain of PLpro and gene 15 specificity.

- A Study of Cardiovascular miRNA Biomarkers for Kawasaki Disease

This article talks about miRNA and its function in Kawasaki Disease. They were not able to identify the cause for cardiovascular miRNAs in Kawasaki Disease, though this study may guide future studies.

- Catalytic Function and Substrate Specificity of the PLpro Domain of nsp3 from the Middle East Respiratory Syndrome Coronavirus (MERS-CoV)

The article shows that differe coronaviruses work the same way, but are not the same efficiency. The two viruses studied included MERS-CoV and SARS-CoV. Though this was an important discovery, neither enzyme can be used as a model to explain the behavior of all CoV PLpros.

- Nidovirus papain-like proteases: Multifunctional enzymes with protease, deubiquitinating and deISGylating activities

Coronaviruses and anteriviruses are positive strand RNA viruses. This article informs us on the nature of Nidoviruses and describes the PLP's role in viral pathogenesis.
