= Harriet Bulkeley =

British geographer and academic

- Born: 17 November 1972 (age 53)
- Education: University of Cambridge
- Scientific career
- Workplaces: Durham University; Lund University; Utrecht University

Harriet Ann Bulkeley OBE FBA (born 17 November 1972) is a British geographer and academic. She is professor of geography at Durham University. Bulkeley is also a coordinator in the Naturvation project. Through her work at Durham University, Harriet is involved in the ReInvent-EU project, which aims to encourage decarbonisation in 4 key areas: plastic, steel, paper and meat and dairy. Her research largely explores the politics and processes surrounding environmental governance, as well as the management of municipal waste in the United Kingdom and the politics, specifically urban politics, of climate change.

In July 2019, she was elected a Fellow of the British Academy (FBA), the United Kingdom's national academy for the humanities and social sciences.

== Education ==
Bulkeley studied at the University of Cambridge, graduating in 1995 with an undergraduate degree in geography, before completing a PhD in geography and philosophy in 1998.

== Published works ==
Bulkeley has published over 50 books and articles, including 'Low Carbon Communities and Social Justice' (2012), which was co-authored by Sarah Fuller, an honorary research fellow, also at the University of Durham's Geography Department.

Bulkeley is also an editor of Environment and Planning C: Government and Policy.

== Research Projects ==
Through both Durham University and the Durham Energy Institute, Harriet has been involved in numerous research projects, including:

- InCluESEV – Interdisciplinary Cluster on Energy Systems, Equity and Vulnerability
- International Network on Urban Low Carbon Transitions (INCUT)
- Customer Led Network Revolution
