= Susan Baker =

British political scientist

Susan Baker (born 9 October 1955) is a Professor Emerita in the School of Social Sciences and former co-director of the Sustainable Places Research Institute at Cardiff University. Her research concerns environmental governance in the European Union and ecofeminism, gender and the environment.

== Biography ==
Baker was born in Loughlinstown, Ireland and moved to Cork as a child. She studied philosophy and economics at University College Cork. After completing an MA and working in the United States and Galway, she won a government scholarship to study for a PhD in political science at the European University Institute (EUI) in Florence. Baker completed her PhD thesis, on "Dependency, ideology and the industrial policy of Fianna Fail in Ireland, 1958–1972", in 1987, and it was examined by Philippe Schmitter, Paul Bew, Jean Blondel and James Wickam. She subsequently lectured at Ulster University in Belfast for six years, and then took up a post at Erasmus University Rotterdam, before moving to Cardiff. In 2001–02, she held a Jean Monnet Fellowship at the EUI's Robert Schuman Centre. Baker became the first woman to be appointed to a King Carl XVI Gustaf Professorship in Environmental Science in 2003, spending the 2003–04 academic year visiting Umeå University while she held the award. In January 2013, she was elected as a Fellow of the Royal Swedish Academy of Agriculture and Forestry.

Baker co-edited the book In Pursuit of Sustainable Development: New Governance Practices at the Sub-national Level in Europe (Routledge, 2008) with Katarina Eckerberg, and is the author of Sustainable Development, which is part of the Routledge Introductions to Environment Series and was published in its second edition in 2015. She delivered keynote lectures at the Nordic Environmental Social Science Conference in 1999 and 2007.

Baker is married to Sean Loughlin, an Emeritus Professor at Cardiff University. The couple met while studying at the EUI and have a daughter.
