= Lorian Swamp =

Area of wetlands on the Ewaso Nyiro river in Kenya

Coordinates: 0°38′46″N 39°36′14″E

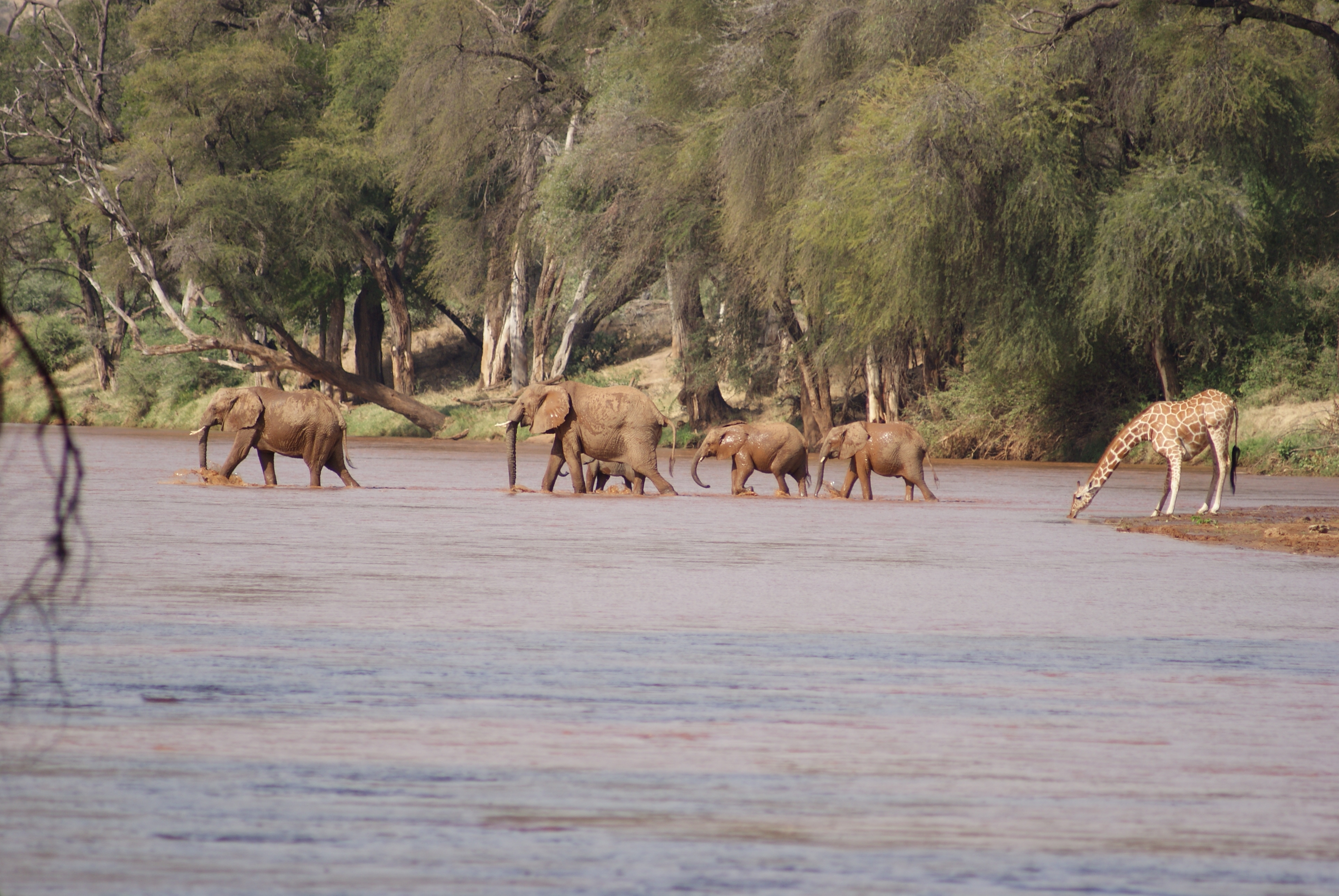
Elephants crossing the Ewaso Ng'iro river at Samburu Park, Kenya, 100 miles west of Lorian Swamp.

The Lorian Swamp is an area of wetlands on the Ewaso Ngiro river in Isiolo North (chari), Kenya.

The swampy zone is 196 kilometres (122 mi) long and has a greatest width of 25 kilometres (16 mi), covering an area of 231,000 hectares (570,000 acres). Apart from the Ewaso Ngiro river, the swamp is also fed by wadis from the southwest and the northeast. The swamp is less than 300 metres (980 ft) above sea level.

The swamp lies in an arid zone, with the local annual rainfall averaging between 180 and 250 mm, but varying widely from year to year. It may be much higher in wet years and much lower in dry years, so the area of the swamp varies considerably. Potential evaporation rates in the swamp are as much as 2,600 mm per year. The swamp may almost completely dry up in drought periods. The area of permanent swamp has shrunk from 150 square kilometres (58 sq mi) in 1913 to around 39 square kilometres (15 sq mi) in 1962 and 8 square kilometres (3.1 sq mi) in 1990.

Little is known about the swamp, due to the hostile terrain and insecurity in the area. It is not protected. The swamp is infested with malarial mosquitos and with vectors of the organisms that cause bilharzia. It is home to crocodiles and is visited by many large savannah mammals. Because of the dangers, cattle are not grazed far into the swamp, but they do make extensive use of the shallow waters, particularly in the dry season.
